= Kyiv Metro =

Rapid transit system in Ukraine

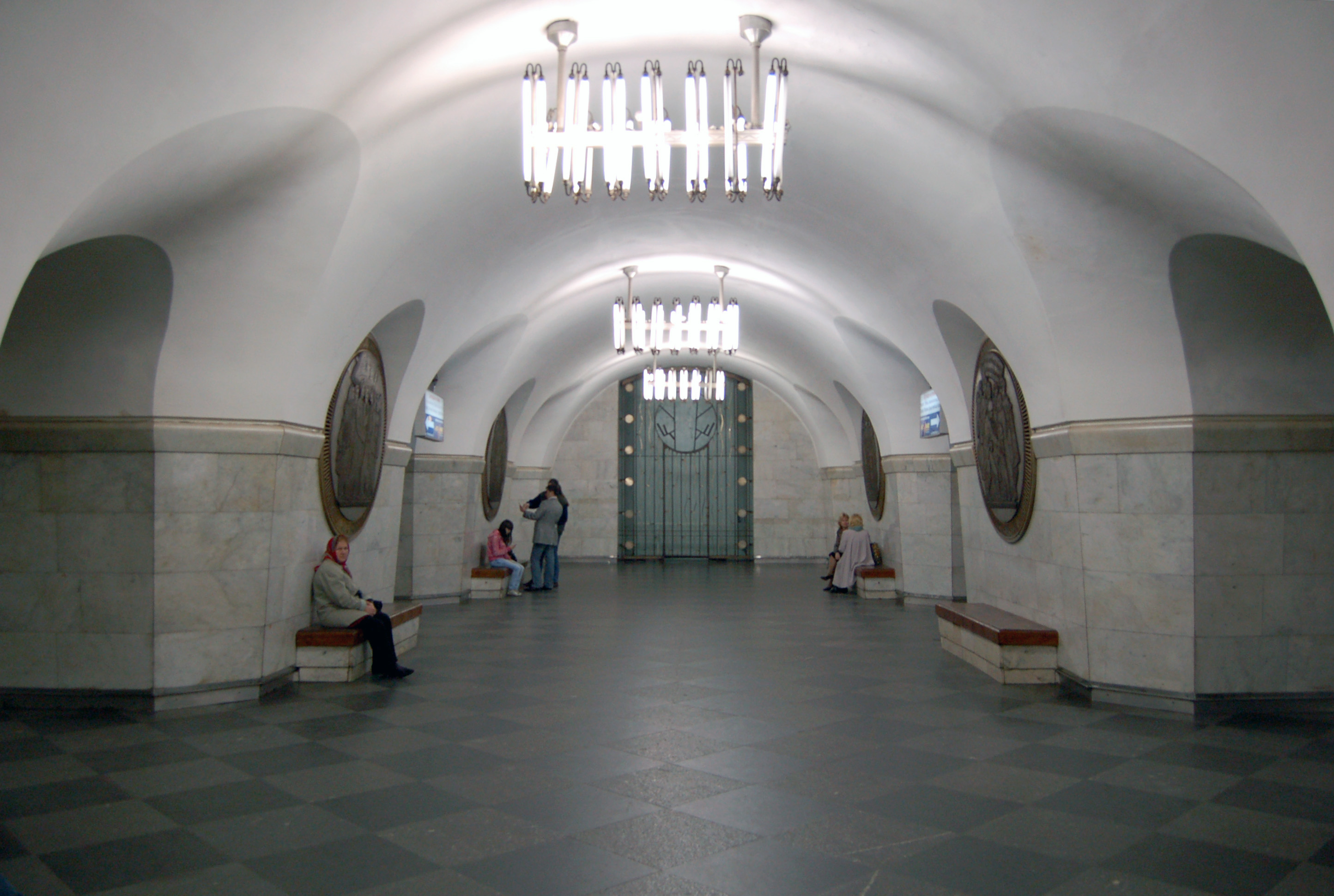
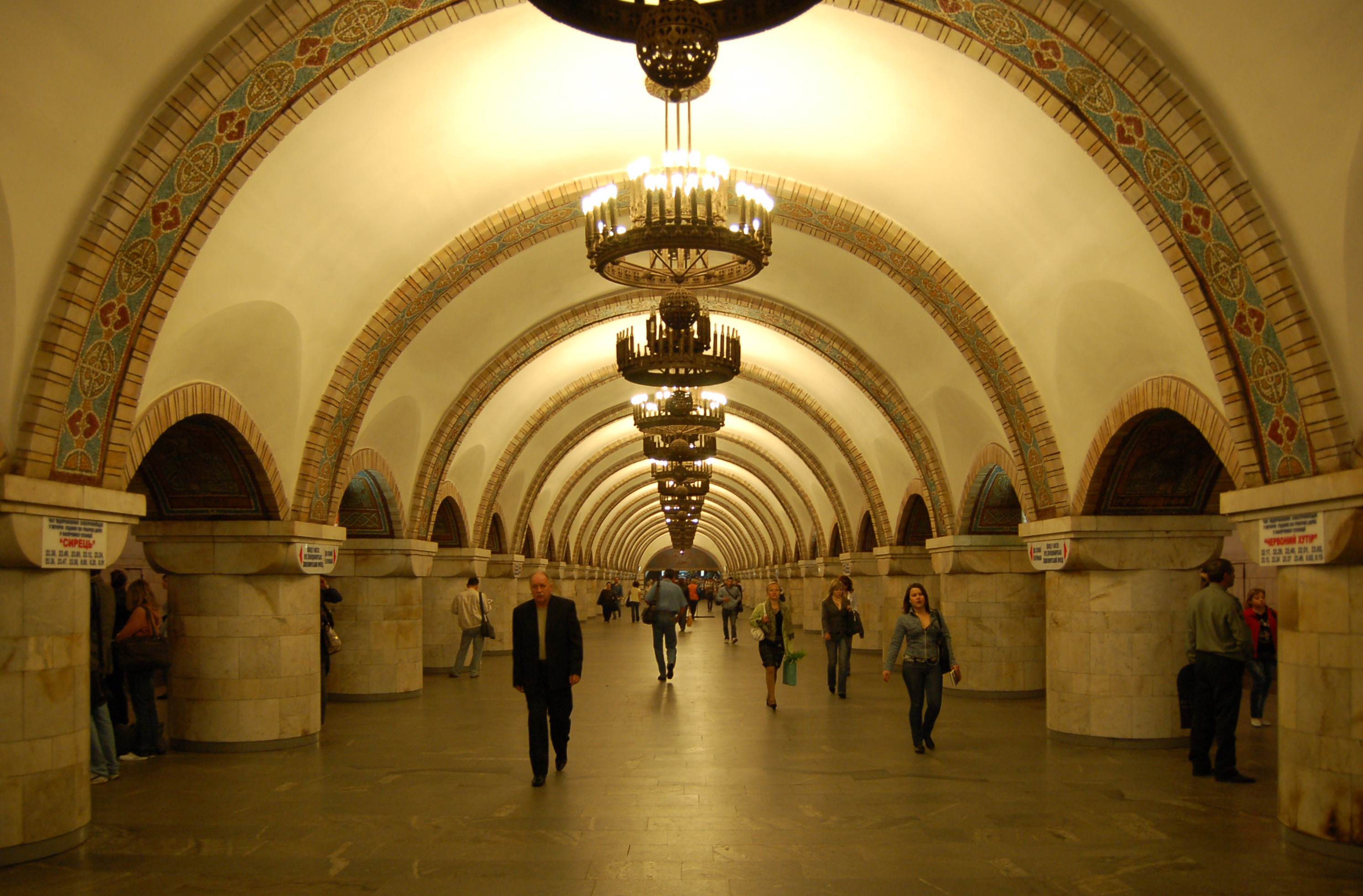
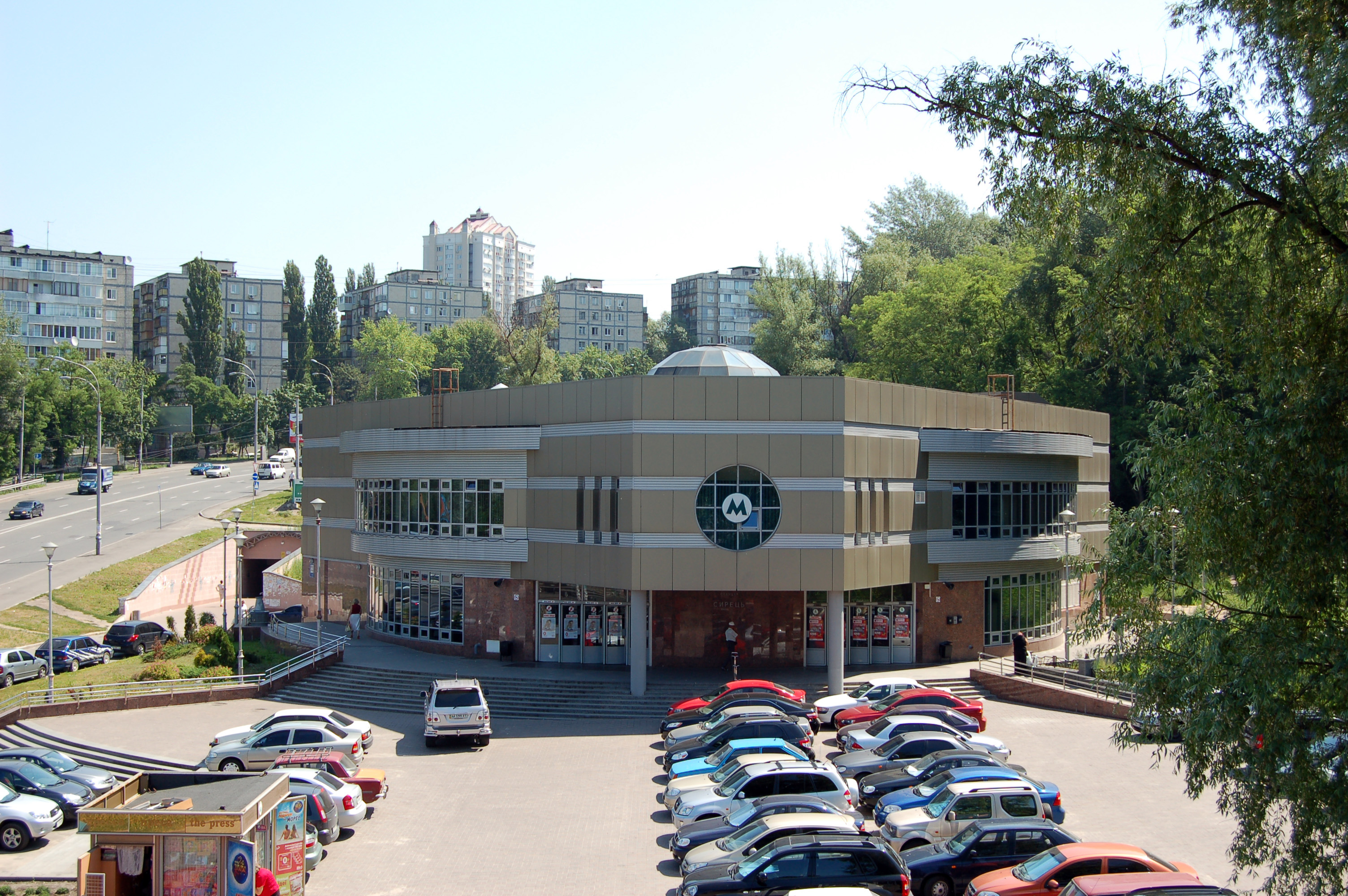
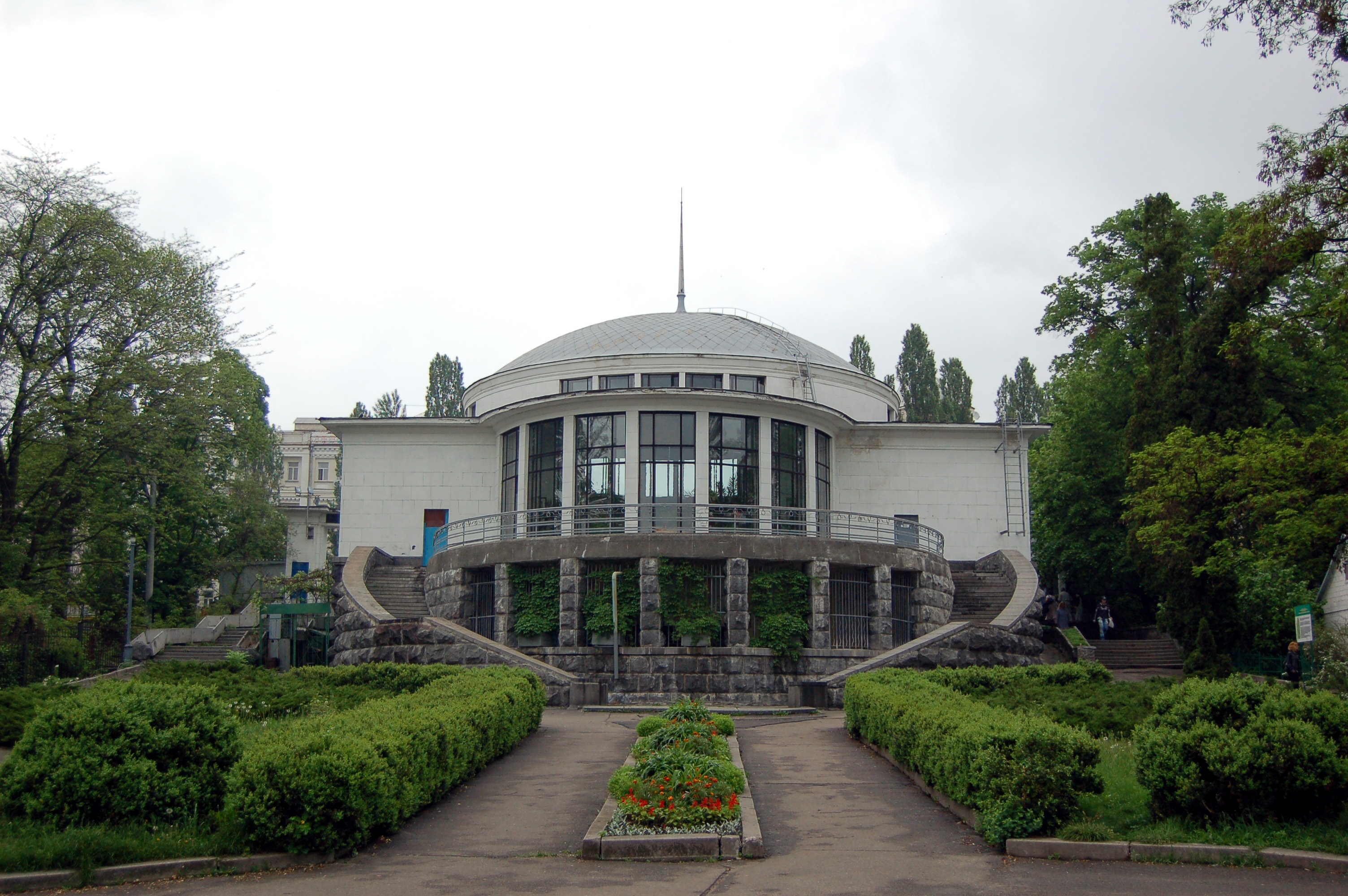
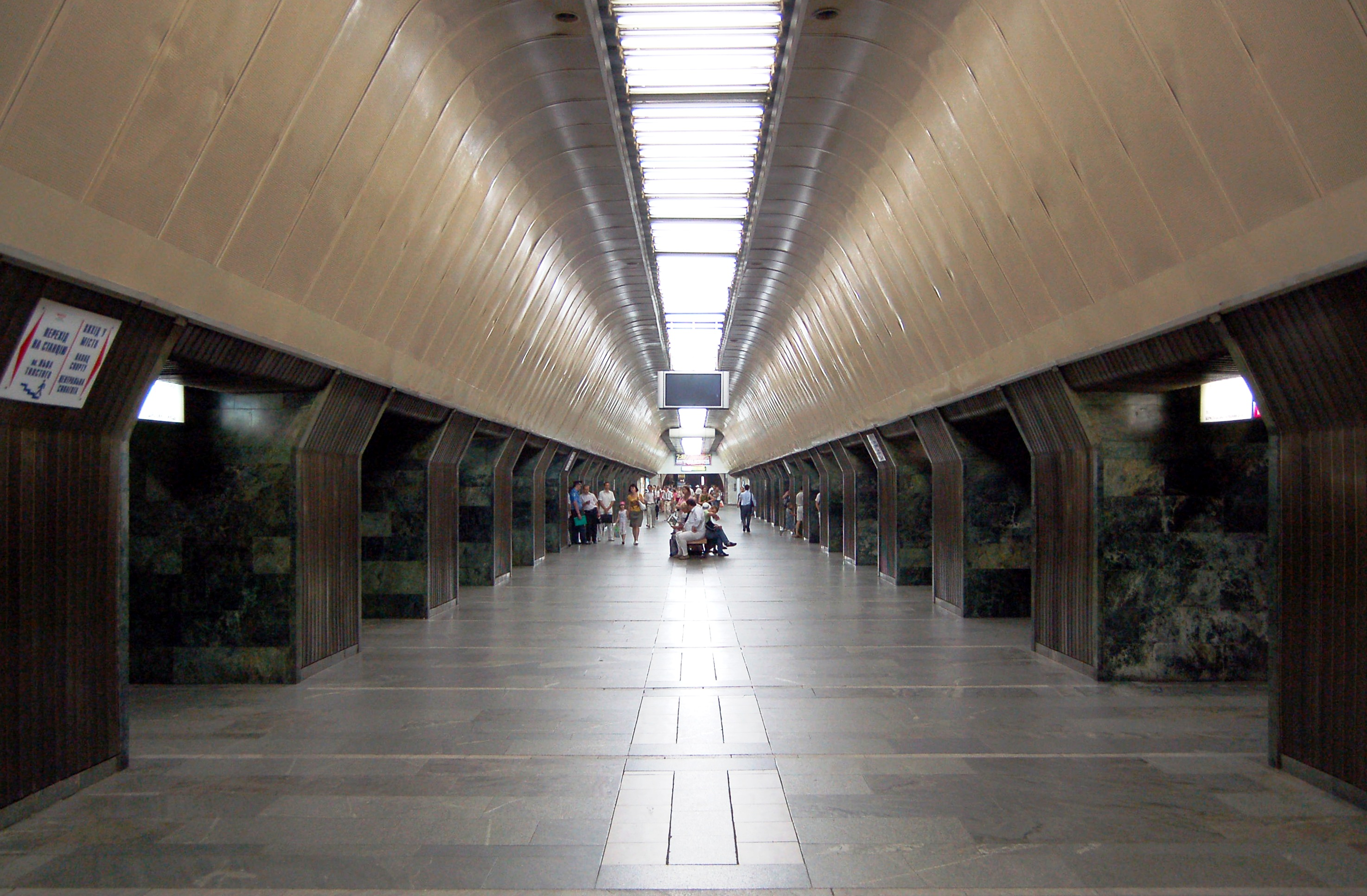
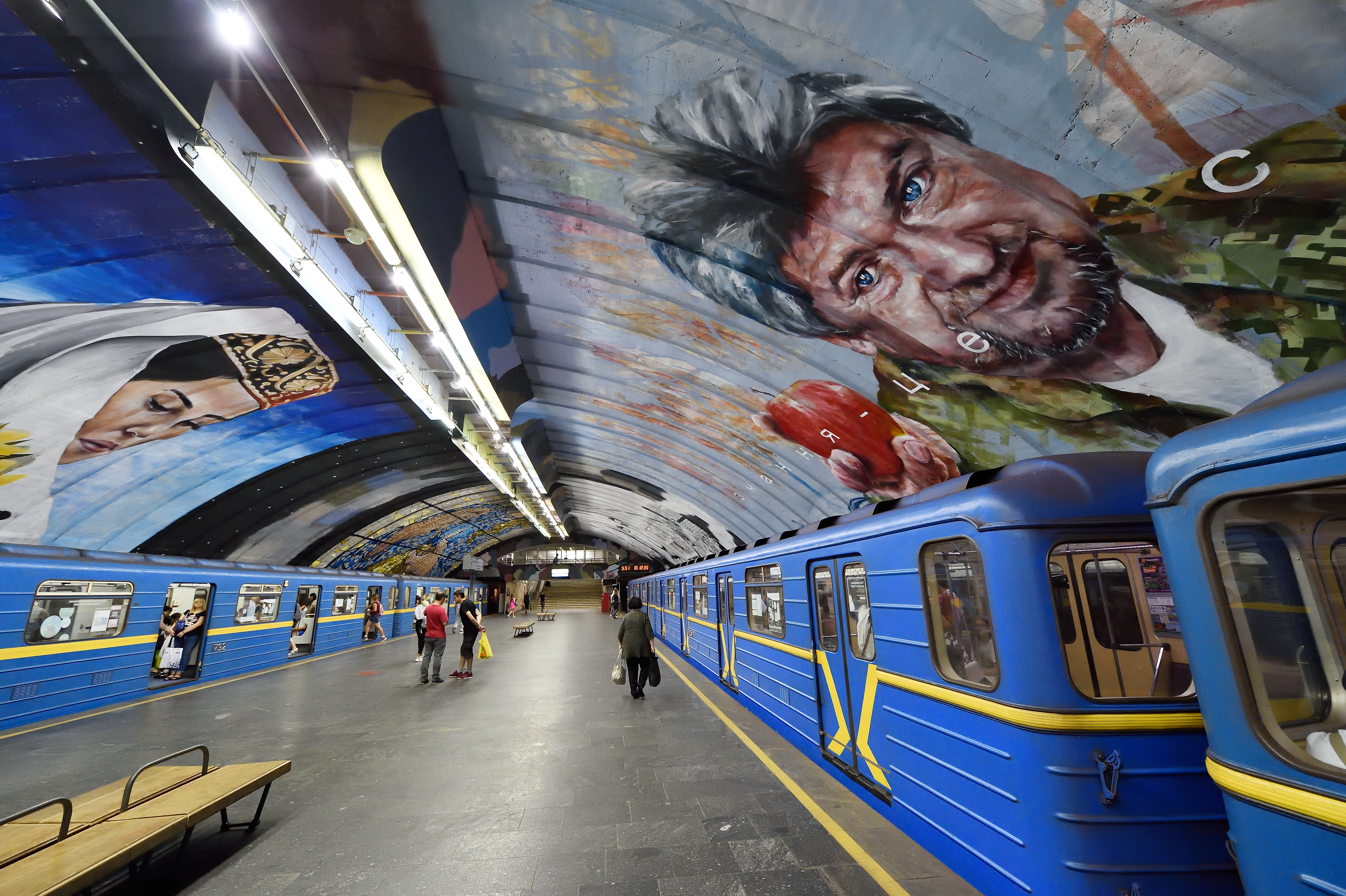
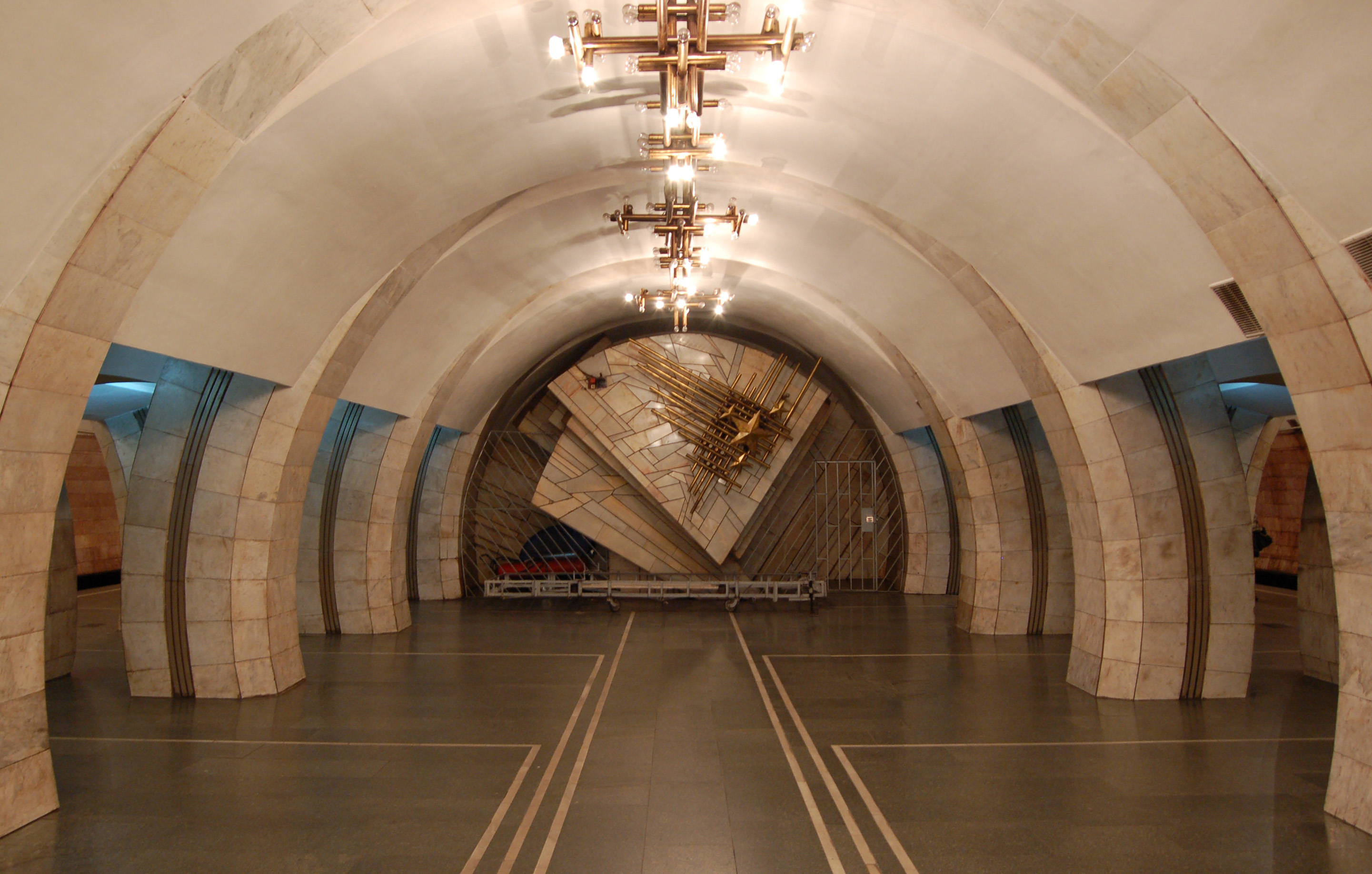
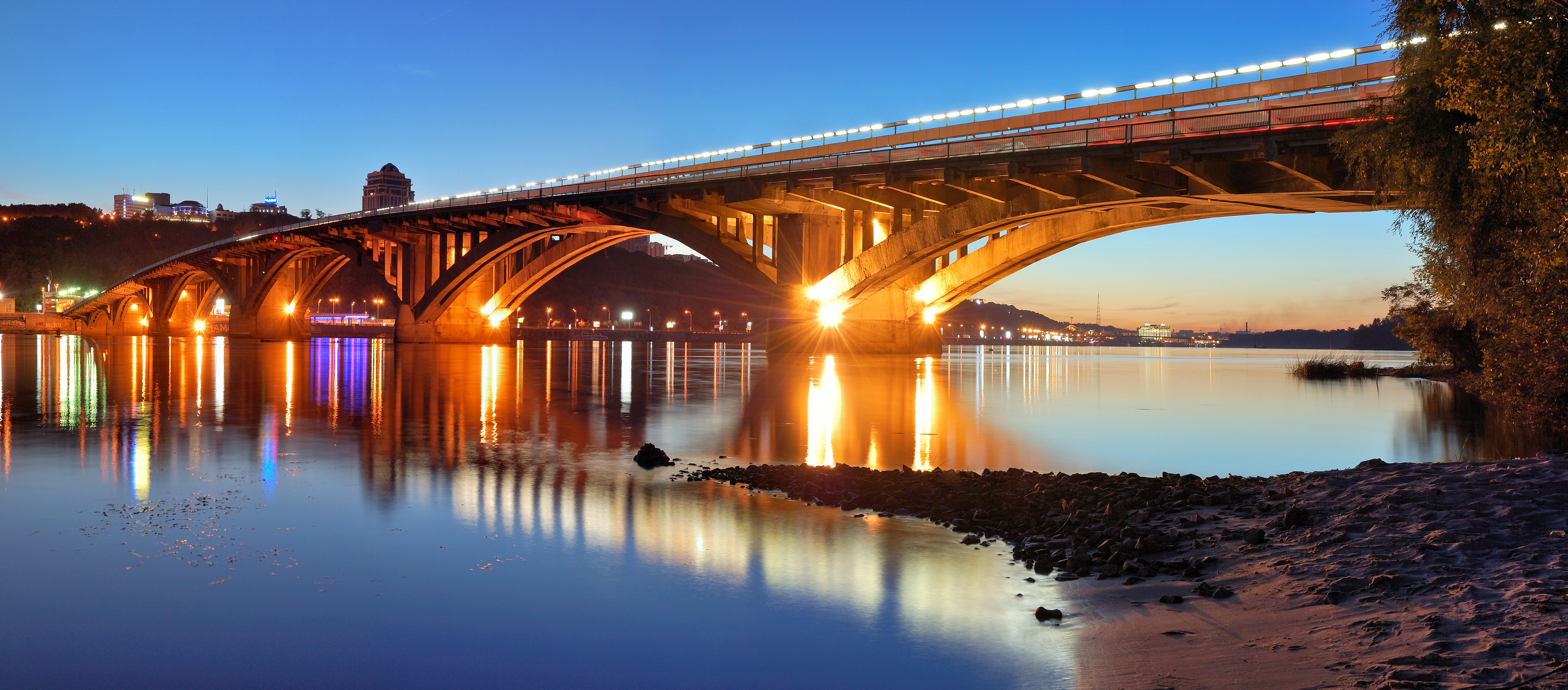
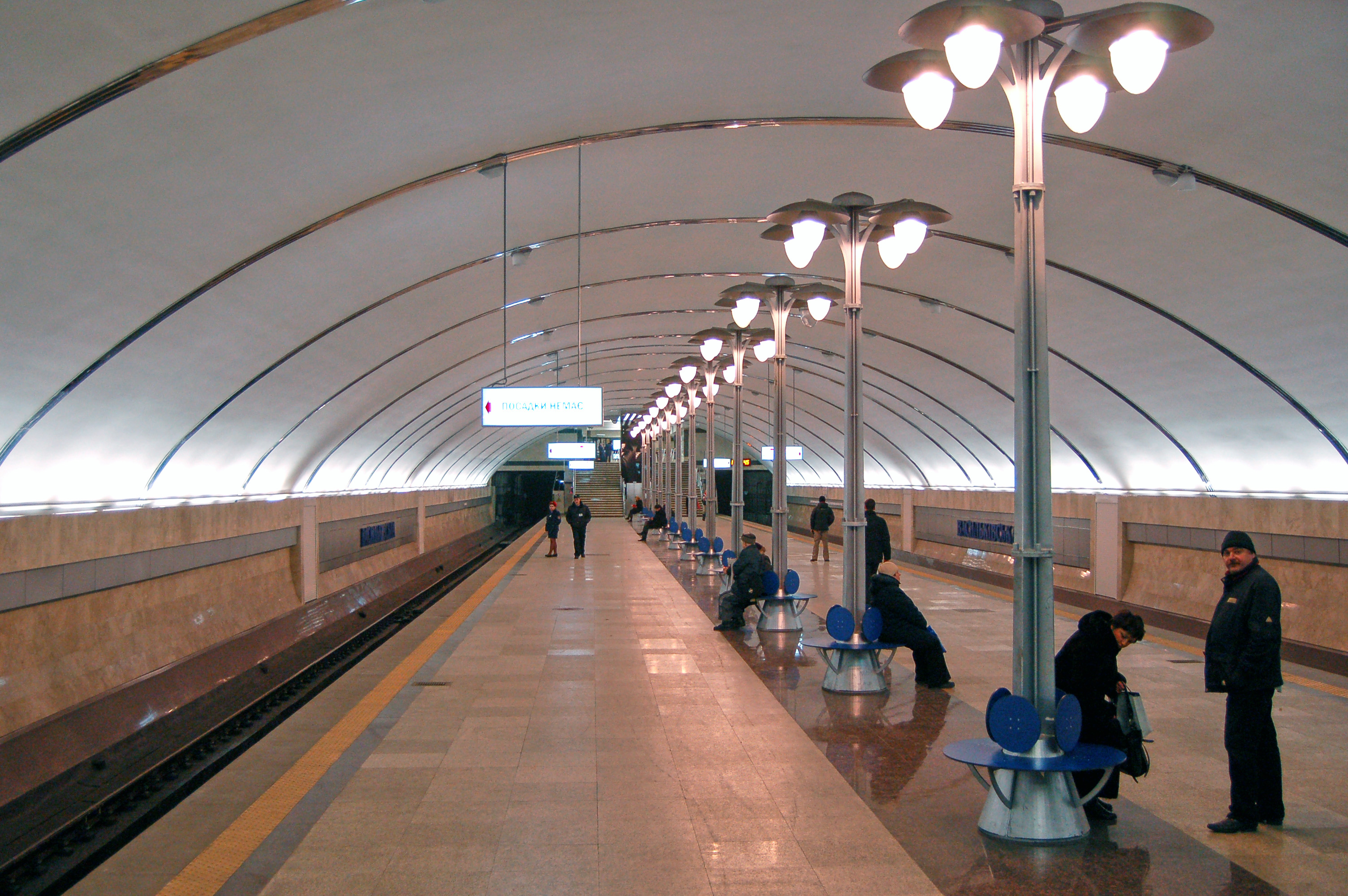
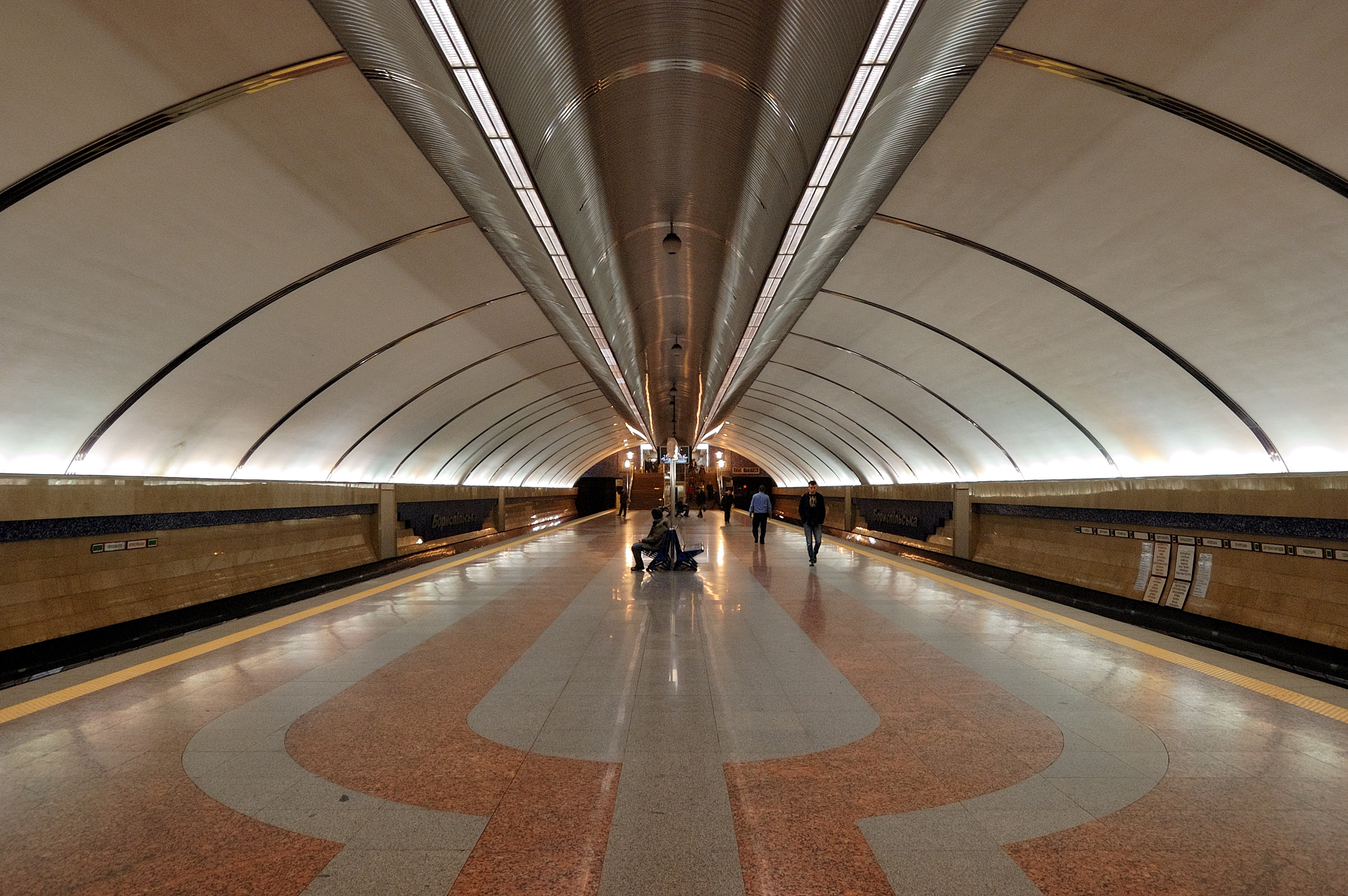
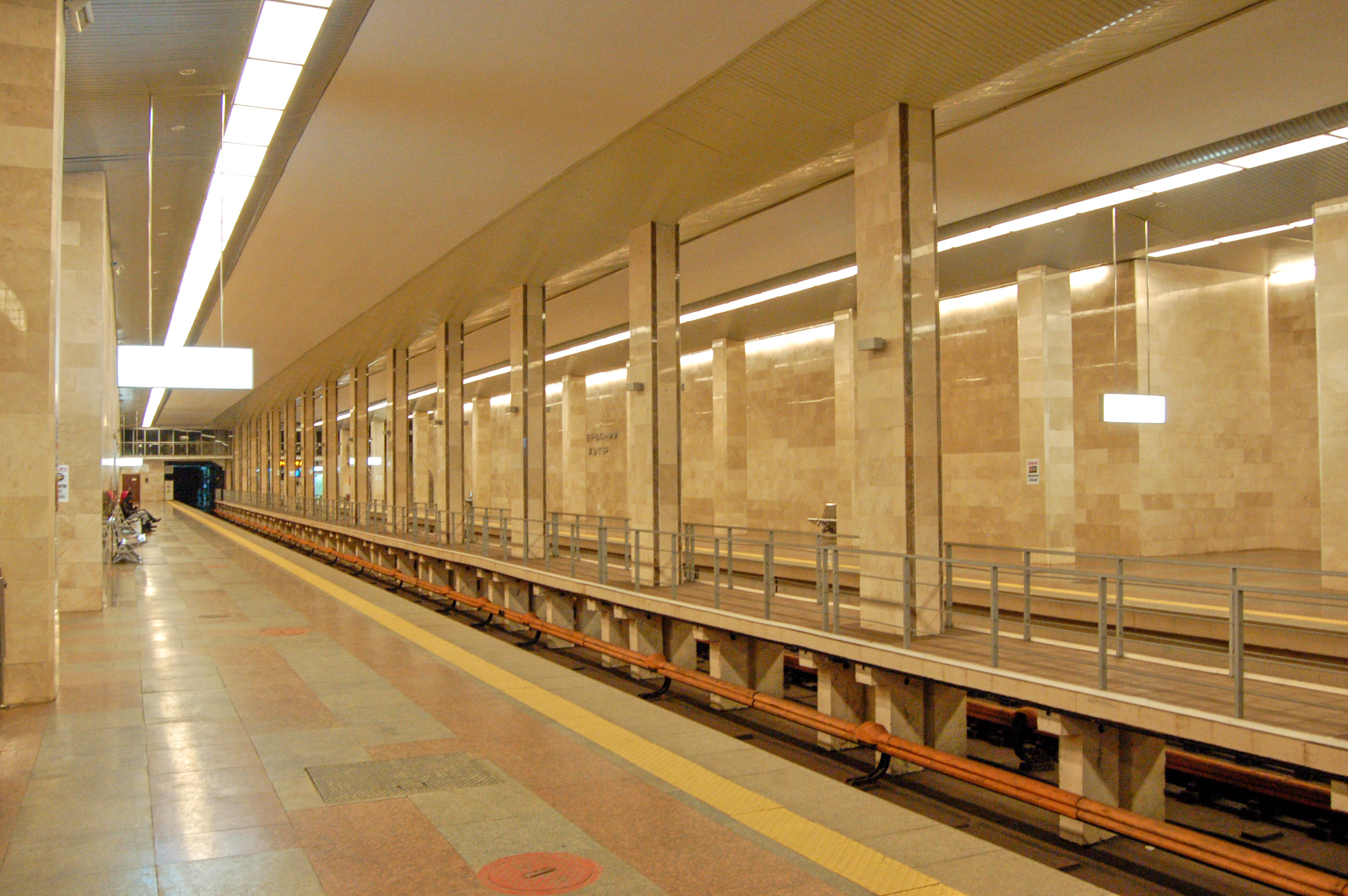

Overview
- Native name: Київський метрополітен; Kyivs'kyi metropoliten
- Owner: Kyiv City Council
- Locale: Kyiv
- Transit type: Rapid transit
- Number of lines: 3 (1 under construction)
- Number of stations: 52 (2 under construction)
- Daily ridership: ▼1.32 million (2016)
- Annual ridership: ▼484.56 million (2016)
- Website: metro.kyiv.ua

Operation
- Began operation: 6 November 1960; 66 years ago
- Operator: Kyivs'kyi Metropoliten
- Number of vehicles: 824 cars (in 130 trains)

Technical
- System length: 67.56 km (41.98 mi)
- Track gauge: 1,520 mm (4 ft 11 27/32 in)
- Electrification: Third rail, 825 V DC
- Average speed: 36.11 km/h (22.44 mph)

The Kyiv Metro (Note: Ukrainian: Київський метрополітен, romanized: Kyivskyi metropoliten, IPA: [ˈkɪjiu̯sʲkɪj ˌmɛtropol⁽ʲ⁾iˈtɛn], also known shortly as Ukrainian: Київське метро, romanized: Kyivske metro, IPA: [ˈkɪjiu̯sʲkɛ ˌmɛtro]) is a rapid transit system in Kyiv, Ukraine, owned by the Kyiv City Council and operated by the city-owned company Kyivskyi Metropoliten. It was initially opened on 6 November 1960, as a single 5.24 km (3.26 mi) line with five stations. It was the first rapid transit system in Ukraine, and the third in the former Soviet Union, after the Moscow Metro and Leningrad Metro. It is one of the three metro systems in Ukraine, together with Kharkiv Metro and Dnipro Metro.

Today, the system consists of three lines and 52 stations, located throughout Kyiv's ten raion (districts), and operates 69.6 kilometers (43.2 mi) of routes, with 67.6 km (42.00 mi) used for revenue service and 2.048 km (1.27 mi) for non-revenue service. At 105.5 m (346 ft 1.5 in) below ground level, Arsenalna station on the Sviatoshynsko-Brovarska Line is the second deepest metro station in the world after Hongyancun station in Chongqing, China.

In 2016, annual ridership for the metro was 484.56 million passengers, or about 1.32 million passengers daily. The metro accounted for 46.7% of Kyiv's public transport load in 2014.

There is also the Kyiv Light Rail and Kyiv Urban Electric Train, which are not part of the Kyiv Metro and are run by different companies (Kyivpastrans and Ukrainian Railways respectively).

== History ==
=== Beginnings (1884-1920) ===
The first idea for an underground railway appeared in 1884. The project, which was given for analysis to the city council by the director of the Southwestern railways, Dmytro Andrievskiy, planned to create tunnels from Kyiv-Pasazhyrskyi railway station. The tunnel was expected to start near Poshtova square and finish near Bessarabka. A new railway station was to be built there, while the old railway station was to be converted into a freight railway station. The project was long discussed but eventually turned down by the city council.

Kyiv was a pioneering city for Imperial Russian rapid transit, opening the first Russian tram system. In September 1916, businessmen of the Russo-American trading corporation attempted to collect funds to sponsor the construction of a metro in Kyiv. As a reason to construct it, the trading corporation wrote:

The development has been lately going at a fast pace, not only when talking about population growth, but as well while talking about the development of trade and industry businesses. The specifics of Kyiv, namely: the distance between the residential districts from the central business district, the insane price of the apartments in the centre and its neighbourhoods, the elongation and hilly position of the city, a predominantly commercial habit of its inhabitants - all those factors make the question of cheap, fast and safe transportation arise. The Kyiv city tram can't answer any of the issues. The tram's drawbacks are widely known, and the reason they appear is that, in the given conditions, the tram network development is not able to keep pace with the fast-growing city. An increase in rolling stock on the main lines may cause a slowdown in street movement, while an increase in speed threatens the safety of people. The only way out of the situation is the transfer from on-ground trams to underground trams, starting from the main streets.

— The Russian-American trading corporation, Kievlyanin, 24 Sep 1916 (O. S.)

Despite the arguments, the project was not accepted by the city council, again.

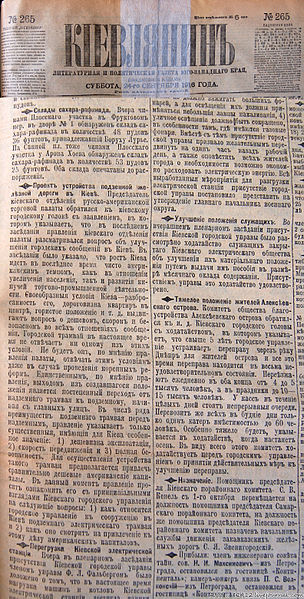
The article in the Kievlyanin newspaper proposing a project of the Kyiv Underground (24 Sep 1916 O.S.).

After the downfall of the Tsarist government, Hetman Skoropadsky was also interested in the building of a metro system, somewhere near the district of Zvirynets, where the government center was planned to be built. As one of the members of his cabinet argued:

[...] [The engineers] have an idea to construct trams, but not the ones [that ride] now, - those overground, and [those] in tunnels that are called "metropoliten" [underground]. The soil of Zvirynets and Kyiv as a whole, where the underground is to be built, is the best for this kind of construction. Under these circumstances, the underground may be even better placed than [the one] in Paris... Kyiv is situated on the hills and ravines created by the nature itself, [so] the underground, appearing from the hill into the ravine, then again passing through the mountain, will transfer everyone and everything from Bessarabka to Demiivka, from Zvirynets to Lukianivka, from Naberezhna [ave.] or Prorizna [str.] to Zadniprovski Slobidky.

— Interview with comrade (deputy) minister of roads engineer Chubynsky, "Відродження" ("The Revival"), 134 (1), 11 Sep 1918, pp. 3-4

However, the project lost its support after the downfall of the Hetmanate in the autumn of 1918 and the change of the Ukrainian government towards the Directorate. Then, in 1919–1920, during the Russian Civil War (in which Ukraine was involved), the project was shelved for good.

Following the Bolsheviks' victory in the Russian Civil War, Kyiv became only a provincial city, and no large-scale proposals to improve the city were made.

=== Initial promotion (1936-1949) ===
In 1934, the capital of the Ukrainian SSR was moved from Kharkiv to Kyiv. On 9 July 1936, the Presidium of the Kyiv City Council assessed the diploma project by Papazov (Papazian), an Armenian graduate of the Moscow University of Transport Engineering, called, "The Project of the Kyiv Metro." The meeting minutes stated that "the author successfully resolved one of the problems of reconstruction of the city of Kyiv and establishment of intra-city transportation and also answered various practical questions about the Metro plan (the routes of the underground, the position of stations)." The engineer Papazov (Papazian) received a bonus of 1,000 Soviet rubles for this project from the City of Kyiv. However, it is unknown if his proposals were taken into account in the plan. A few days before, on 5 July, the Kyiv newspaper Bil'shovyk (Ukrainian) published an article that featured a project of underground, prepared by engineers from the Transport Devices Institute in Ukraine's Soviet Socialist Republic's Academy of Sciences. The project promised to consruct three lines of a Metro, approximately 50 km (31 mi) long.

Rumors started spreading that the construction of the Metro would begin soon. At first, the city council denied these rumors, amid letters from the specialists in the drilling and mining sectors offering their services. But in 1938, officials started preparatory work. However, this stopped abruptly in 1941 with the start of the Great Patriotic War (World War II). By the end of the war, Kyiv was destroyed. Being the third largest city in the USSR, a massive reconstruction process was ordered. This time, the Metro was taken into account.

Work continued in 1944, after Kyiv's liberation. On 5 August 1944, a resolution from the Soviet Union's Government was proclaimed. The resolution planned for underground construction, thus the government ordered the appropriate organizations to continue preparatory works, create a technical project, and estimate total costs. To finance this initial work, the USSR's National Commissariat of Finances allocated 1 million Soviet rubles from the Reserve Fund of the USSR's government. On 22 February 1945, another resolution was proclaimed, which definitively ordered the underground to be constructed.

To determine where the underground construction was most suitable, experts from the Kyiv Office of Metrogiprotrans analyzed the flow of passengers in the streets of Kyiv, both in the city center and in the outskirts. The analysis revealed three suitable directions to construct the underground: Sviatoshyn–Brovary, Kurenivka–Demiivka, and Syrets–Pechersk. The former two were chosen to be built. It was decided that the first section of underground openings along these two directions—30.4 km (18.9 mi) in length—would be constructed by 1950.

This plan, however, did not come to life. The final preparations were not conducted until 1949. By the decision of the Ministry of Communication, the Kyivmetrobud enterprise was established on 14 April. Only then did the underground construction finally begin.

=== First phase ===
Timelapse of Kyiv Metro construction (in Ukrainian)

Construction planning of the first line (M1) of the Kyiv Metro began in August 1949. The initial plan had seven stations, and a project design competition for the stations was announced in 1952. The competition commission wanted all seven stations to have a Stalinist style: richly decorated and adorned with Communist symbols and national (Ukrainian) motifs. However, the competition was cancelled, partly due to the cancellation of the two westernmost stations and partly due to Khrushchev Thaw, which made the Stalinist style inappropriate.

Tunnel drilling was frequently met with unanticipated difficulties—such as unexpected drilling terrain and underground water sources—causing the construction to fall severely behind schedule. In December 1951, the first connection between separate tunnels was made between Dnipro and Arsenalna stations, while the last was created between the Vokzalna and Universytet stations, in May 1959.

Various difficulties arose during the construction of the underground. For example, Arsenalna station was constantly flooded by underground waters despite its exceptional depth, which was originally intended to prevent flooding. Moreover, the project came to a standstill in 1954 when funding was instead allocated to the development of unused land fit for agriculture. Nevertheless, work progressed.

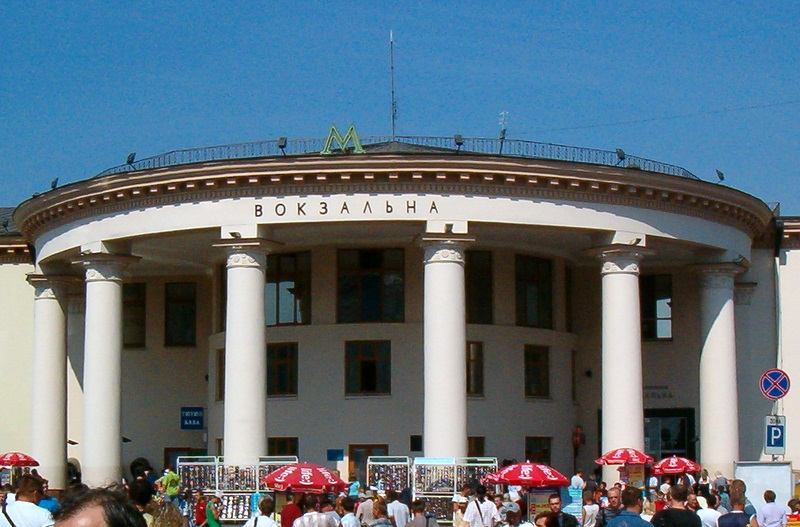
Earlier stations are ornately decorated, and many have impressive vestibules, such as this at Vokzalna station.

At the beginning of 1958, a competition for the best design of stations was announced. A commission analyzing the works was created, consisting of activists, engineering and architecture experts from both the Ukrainian SSR and the USSR, sculptors, artists, writers, and the heads of the organizations Glavtunelstroy, Metrogiprotrans, and Kyivmetrobud. In July, an exhibition of 80 works was organized. The best five designs were used for the first five stations of the Kyiv Metro: Vokzalna, Universytet, Khreshchatyk, Arsenalna, and Dnipro.

During this construction, 660,400 m^{3} (23,321,805.9 cu ft) of concrete was poured, and 7,300 m^{2} (78,576.5 sq ft) of granite and marble were used to decorate the stations.

On 22 October 1960, a test run was made by Alexey Semagin, a motorman of the Moscow Metro, and Ivan Vynogradov, the former train operator from the central railway station of Kyiv-Pasazhyrskyi. Semagin drove, with Vynogradov acting as an assistant.

On 6 November 1960, the anniversary of the October Revolution, the five-station, 5.24 km (3.26 mi) Vokzalna–Dnipro portion of the east–west line (today known as the Sviatoshynsko-Brovarska Line) was opened. That day, the motormen changed their places, and thus Ivan Vynogragov has now been deemed the first motorman of the Kyiv Metro.

=== Opening and aftermath ===
The underground was not available to the public the same day the line was declared open. During the first week, special passes had to be shown to ride the newly opened section. True public service only started on 13 November. At the time, the stations had no turnstiles; the tickets were shown to the inspector.

Immediately after the Kyiv Metro's opening, the need for a train depot became a problem. It was not feasible to construct a permanent on-ground depot as the stations were deep underground. Yet the creation of an underground depot was costly. At first, it was solved by creating a temporary depot next to Dnipro station, where Kyivmetrobud had its headquarters at the time. There were some warehouses constructed as well so that necessary items could be substituted if needed. Unfortunately, this temporary depot was not connected to the main underground line. To move trains to the depot, an overhead crane was used.

Simultaneously, another logistics problem appeared: there was no connection between the underground and the railway. At the time, the metro line was served by type Д underground trains (produced by Metrowagonmash). To deliver them to the underground, the trains had to be placed on a special carriage at Darnytsia railway station. The carriage was then transported by trams (via the now non-existing tram line along the Dnipro river) to the temporary depot, where the trains were then lifted onto the railway turntable. Since the procedure was uncomfortable and tedious, most trains were stabled overnight in the tunnels and visited the depot only for maintenance.

At the time, the Kyiv Metro was under the jurisdiction of the USSR's Ministry of Communication, and not of Kyiv's city council. Until 1962, the motormen were mostly from Moscow, as no institution provided appropriate training in Ukraine. Some Kyiv railway engineers were employed (such as Vynogragov), but they had to qualify as motormen in Moscow.

=== Extension of the first line ===
The second stage of construction of the first line started in 1960, and finished on 5 November 1963, with the opening of a 3.4 km (2.1 mi) section with two stations: Politekhnichnyi Instytut and Zavod Bilshovyk (now Shuliavska station). A year later, new type E underground trains were introduced.

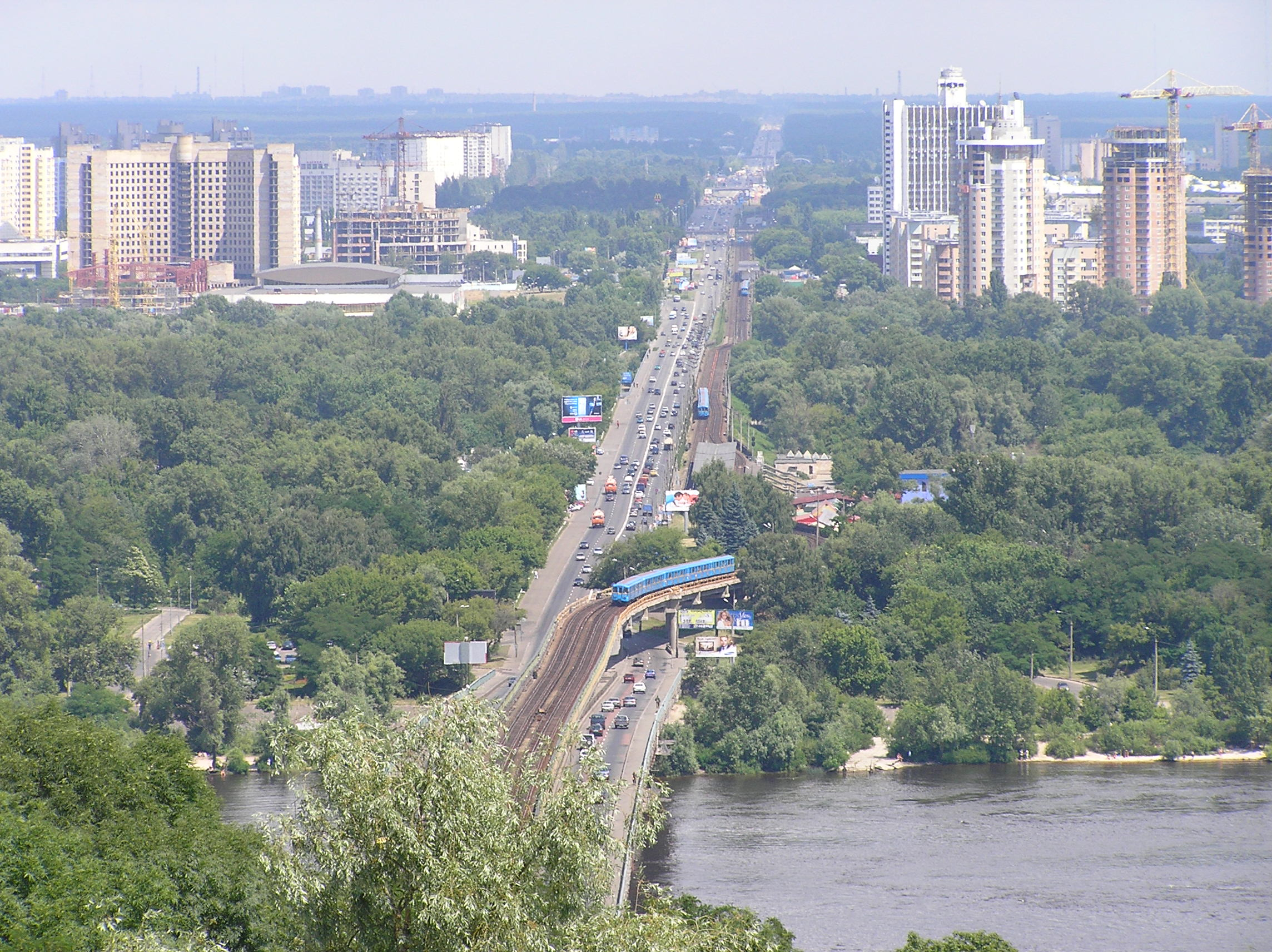
View of the eastern extension of the M1 line

In 1965, the line crossed the Dnieper river on the newly constructed Kyiv Metro Bridge and Rusanivskyi Metropolitan Bridge and was extended to the large residential areas being built along the east bank of the river. Like the Dnipro station, Hidropark, Livoberezhna, and Darnytsia stations all were built on-ground. Additionally, to resolve the question of a temporary depot, a permanent depot (Darnytsia Metro Depot) was built between Livoberezhna and Darnytsia stations; importantly, it had access to Kyiv-Dniprovskyi railway station. New trains could now be easily transported immediately into the depot, which, having a connection with the metro line, could also easily host trains.

A few developments were made to the old stations. Since Khreshchatyk station was opened with only one exit, a second one was built and opened on 4 September 1965. A third exit was finished in May 1970. While being modernized, the station was lengthened by 40 meters.

Further extension of the first line to the east was made in 1968, when Komsomolska station (now Chernihivska station) was opened, along with another facility where the trains could be repaired.

When it was discovered that Leningrad's Metro E-type underground trains were not suitable for the platform screen doors of new stations under construction, they were delivered to Kyiv in 1969; meanwhile, Kyiv's older D-type trains, which did not have any problems with these new stations, were transported to Leningrad.

In 1970, an additional carriage was added to every train, for a total of four. A fifth was added two years later. Since 1972, the number of carriages has remained constant (as of 4 July 2017).

On 5 November 1971, Kyiv's then-westernmost neighborhoods were connected to the metro. Three new stations were opened: Zhovtneva (now Beresteiska), Nyvky, and Sviatoshyno (now with the "o" removed). Thus, the metro was extended to 14 stations and a length of 18.2 km (11.3 mi).

On 23 August 1972, the billionth passenger of the Kyiv Metro entered Arsenalna station. The worker of the "Arsenal" factory was given a yearly ticket for the Metro as commemoration of the event.

Finally, in 1973–1974, another modernization of the Metro was made, the third to the rolling stock. New type Eм underground trains from Leningrad's train building facility were delivered to Kyiv.

Further extensions on this line occurred in 1978 (with Pionerska station, now Lisova) and 2003 (with Zhytomyrska and Akademmistechko stations).

=== Second line ===
Construction of the second line (M2) began in 1971. The line became known as "Kurenivsko-Chervonoarmiyska"; however, the name did not completely correspond to the actual route, as it does not pass via Kurenivka. In mid-1960, when plans for the line were made, the construction was expected to go towards Kurenivka and Priorka, connecting Zavodska station (instead of today's Tarasa Shevchenka), Petropavlivska station near Kurenivskyi park, and Shevhenka Square station under the square. However, as the decision to create the Obolon residential district was made, these plans changed.

The new line was constructed in the open and its stations were not constructed deep underground. Because of this, historical buildings were demolished in the Podil neighborhood. During construction, archaeologists discovered a 600–700 m^{2} (6,500–7,500 sq ft) house dated from Kyivs'ka Rus' (879–1240) under the Red Square (now Kontraktova Square). The discovery helped historians understand the life of Podil inhabitants in the Middle Ages at a much more profound scale. This archaeological research was one of the reasons the underground construction was suspended, which is why the small 2.32 km (1.44 mi) stretch was opened only on 17 December 1976. It contained three stations: Kalinina Square (later renamed to Ploshcha Zhovtnevoi Revolutsii (lit. 'October Revolution Square') on 17 October 1977 for the upcoming 60th anniversary of the October Revolution; now Maidan Nezalezhnosti), Poshtova Ploshcha, and Chervona Ploshcha. Additionally, there was a repair facility near Chervona Ploshcha and a transfer corridor to the older (M1) line, separate for trains and passengers. This corridor allowed the exchange of rolling stock, and more importantly, allowed trains on the new line to access the Darnytsia depot until a new one appeared in 1988.

Simultaneously, an extension on the first line was made eastward. In 1978, Pionerska station was opened, which might have been the next step towards the realization of Stalin times projects (the line was planned to be extended to Brovary, the satellite town of Kyiv). Nevertheless, construction on the first line came to a halt, and, as of 4 July 2017, there were no plans yet to extend the line eastwards beyond Lisova station, so construction efforts were shifted to the second line.

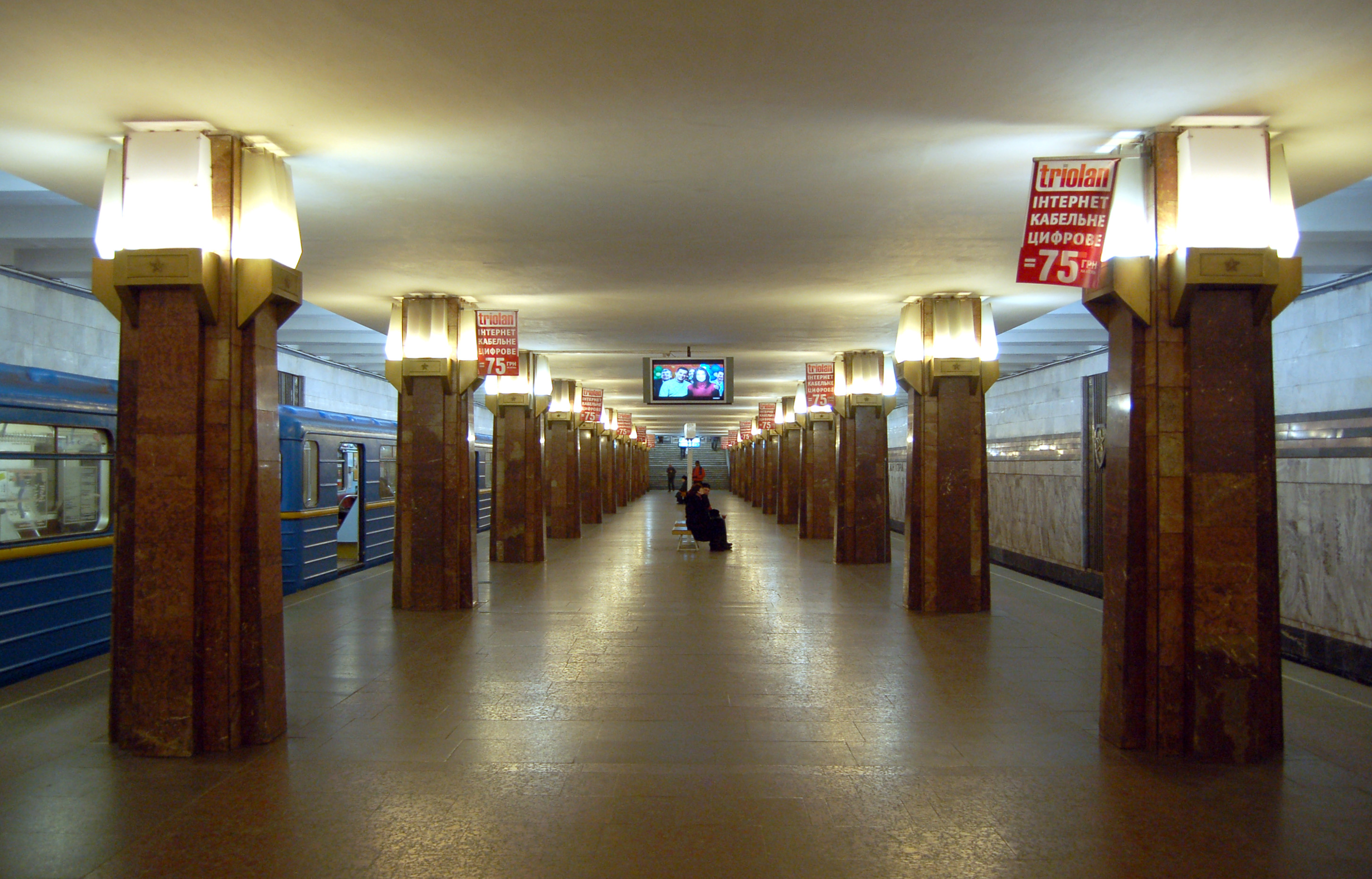
Heroiv Dnipra station, built as part of the second line

The second line—which became known as the Kurenivsko-Chervonoarmiyska line (today the Obolonsko–Teremkivska line)—continued expanding. On 19 December 1980, three new stations—Tarasa Shevchenka, Petrivka (now Pochaina station), and Prospekt Korniychuka (now Obolon station)—were opened on the northern part of the line. After another two years, the Minska and Heroiv Dnipra stations were added to the second line, on the 55th anniversary of the October Revolution. This connected the then-largest residential district of Kyiv to the rapid transit network.

Construction did not stop at the southern end of the line. Ploshcha Lva Tolstoho and Respublikanskyi Stadion (now Olimpiiska station) were opened on 19 December 1981, followed by Chervonoarmiiska (now Palats "Ukrayina" station) and Dzerzhynska (now Lybidska station) on 30 December 1984. Construction then started to the southwest of the newly opened terminus but was soon interrupted by an accident while workers were drilling through the difficult terrain under the Lybid river. Further work only continued 21 years later, in the summer of 2005.

=== Infrastructure development ===
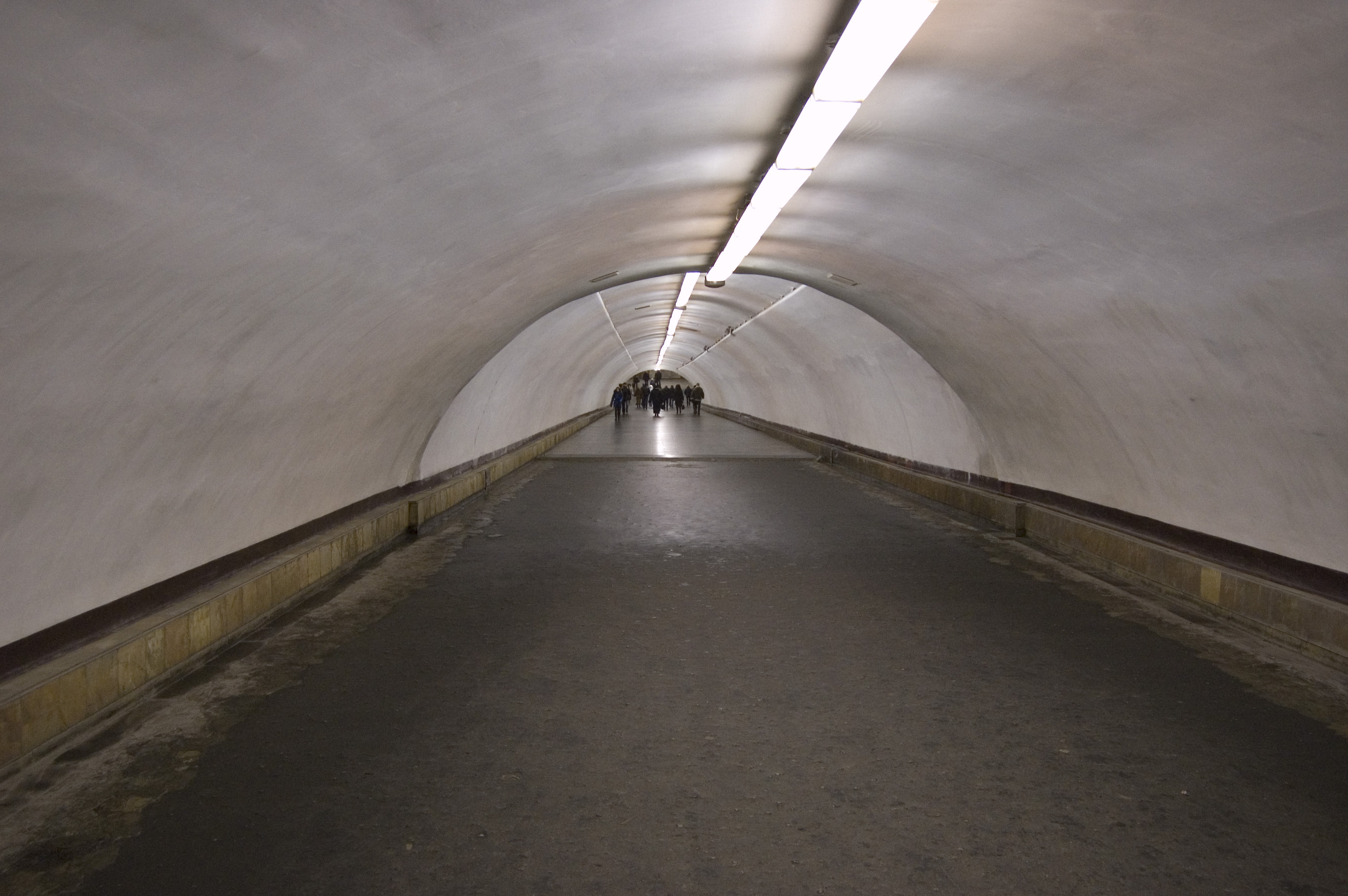
This is the so-called "long" corridor on the transfer between lines M1 and M2, opened in late 1986.

In 1980, while the construction of the M2 line was at its height, the new rolling stock from Metrowagonmash (81-717/714) started to be used.

In 1985, a new train repair plant was built, first called ОМ-2. Additionally, once it appeared that the corridor between October Revolution Square and Khreshchatyk was not able to cope with the stream of passengers, a second corridor was built (informally called the "long" corridor), opening on 3 December 1986. The same year, disambiguation to the Darnytsia depot was made (three tracks were made, of which two are for passenger traffic, while the third was supposed to let the trains exit the depot).

On 30 December 1987, the second (eastern) exit from the Hydropark station was built and opened only in summer.

Lastly, on 19 March 1988, a new depot (called the Obolon Depot) was created to serve the M2 line.

=== Third line ===
==== Soviet period ====
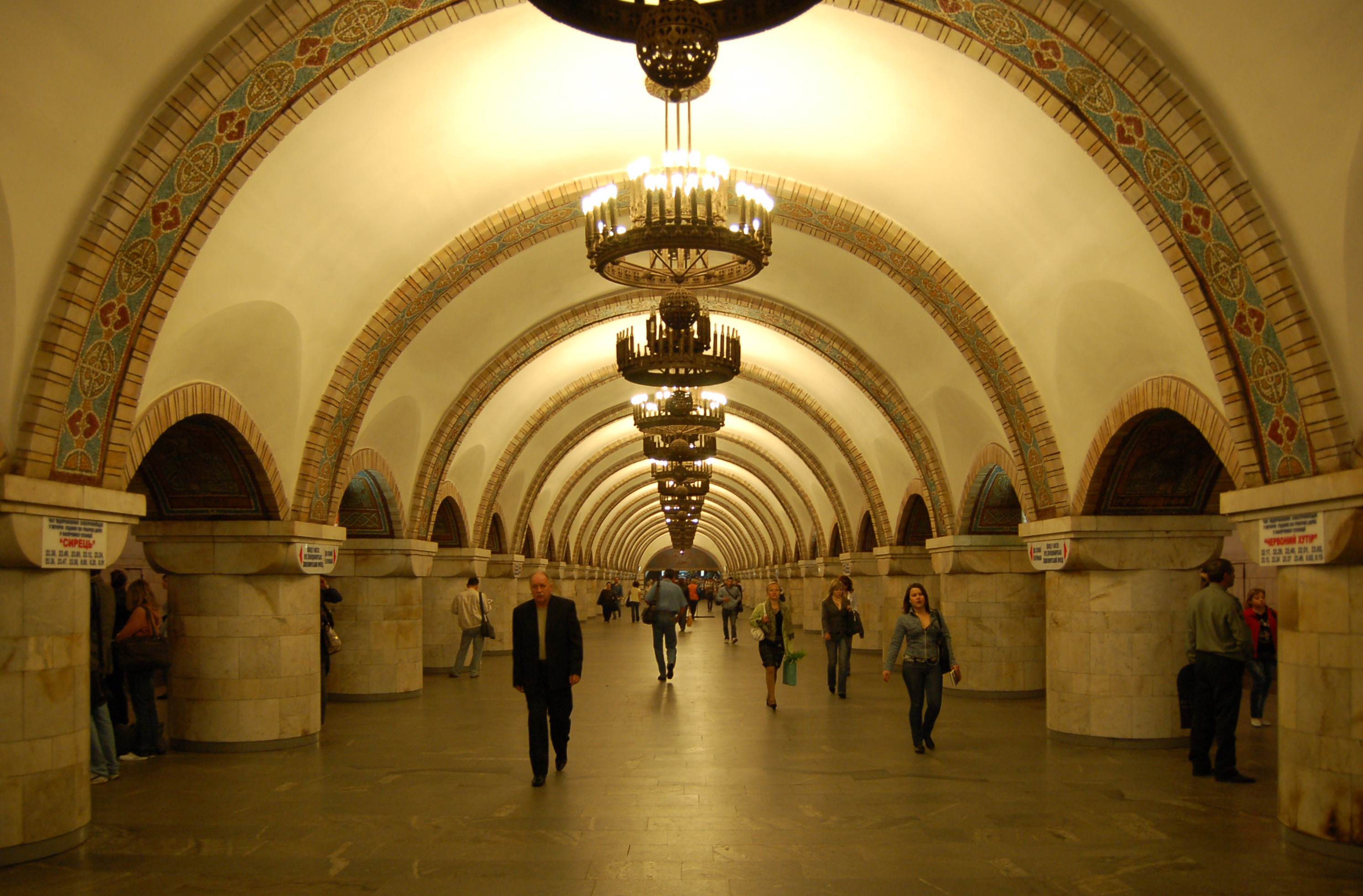
Zoloti Vorota station incorporates a very distinctive Ukrainian theme in its design.

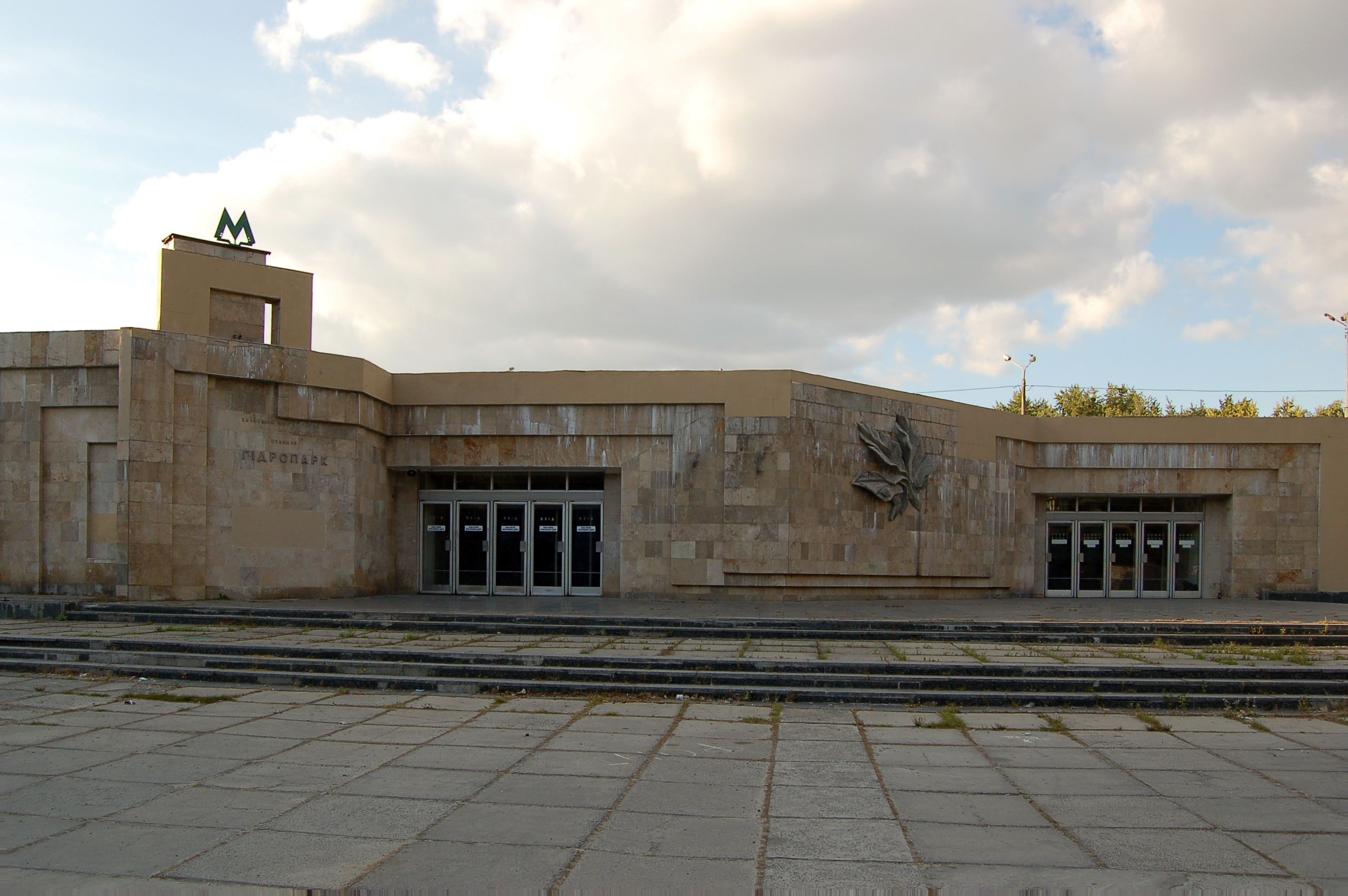
The eastern exit facade of Hidropark station, created in 1987

The first event connected with the construction of the third line (M3) was the creation of a new tunnel on the M1 line between the Vokzalna and Khreshchatyk stations. In the middle of it, a new station, Leninska, was to arise, specially designed as a transfer hub to the future M3 line. When the new tunnel was ready to be connected to the rest of the line, service in the old M1 tunnel between Vokzalna and Khreshchatyk was interrupted from 31 March to 1 October 1987. During this time, two shuttle trains carried passengers from Vokzalna to Universytet stations, and the tunnel between Universytet and Khreshchatyk was closed. To manage passengers, additional temporary lines of buses and trolleybuses were created. The Leninska station itself was inaugurated on the 70th anniversary of the October Revolution, on 6 November 1987, and is now known as Teatralna station.

The older tunnels, over 300 m (980 ft) each, partially cut by the ceiling of the Zoloti Vorota station, still exist and are now accessible only for maintenance by staff.

Construction of the third line (called the Syretsko-Pecherska Line, the northwest–southeast axis) started in 1981. The initial 2.1 km (1.3 mi) segment was finished on 31 December 1989 and featured three stations: Zoloti Vorota, Palats Sportu, and Mechnikova (now Klovska). The first two were transfer hubs to other lines; the third was the start of a technical tunnel between lines M2 and M3, which allowed trains from the M3 line to use the Obolon depot on the M2 line. Until 30 April 1990, the exit from Zoloti Vorota station (the then-northern terminus of M3) was only possible via Leninska station. An exit from Zoloti Vorota onto Volodymyrska Street was only opened on 1 May 1990.

A total of 31 stations and 34.6 km (21.5 mi) of passenger tunnels were constructed during the first 31 years of the subway system in the Ukrainian SSR.

==== Post-independence ====
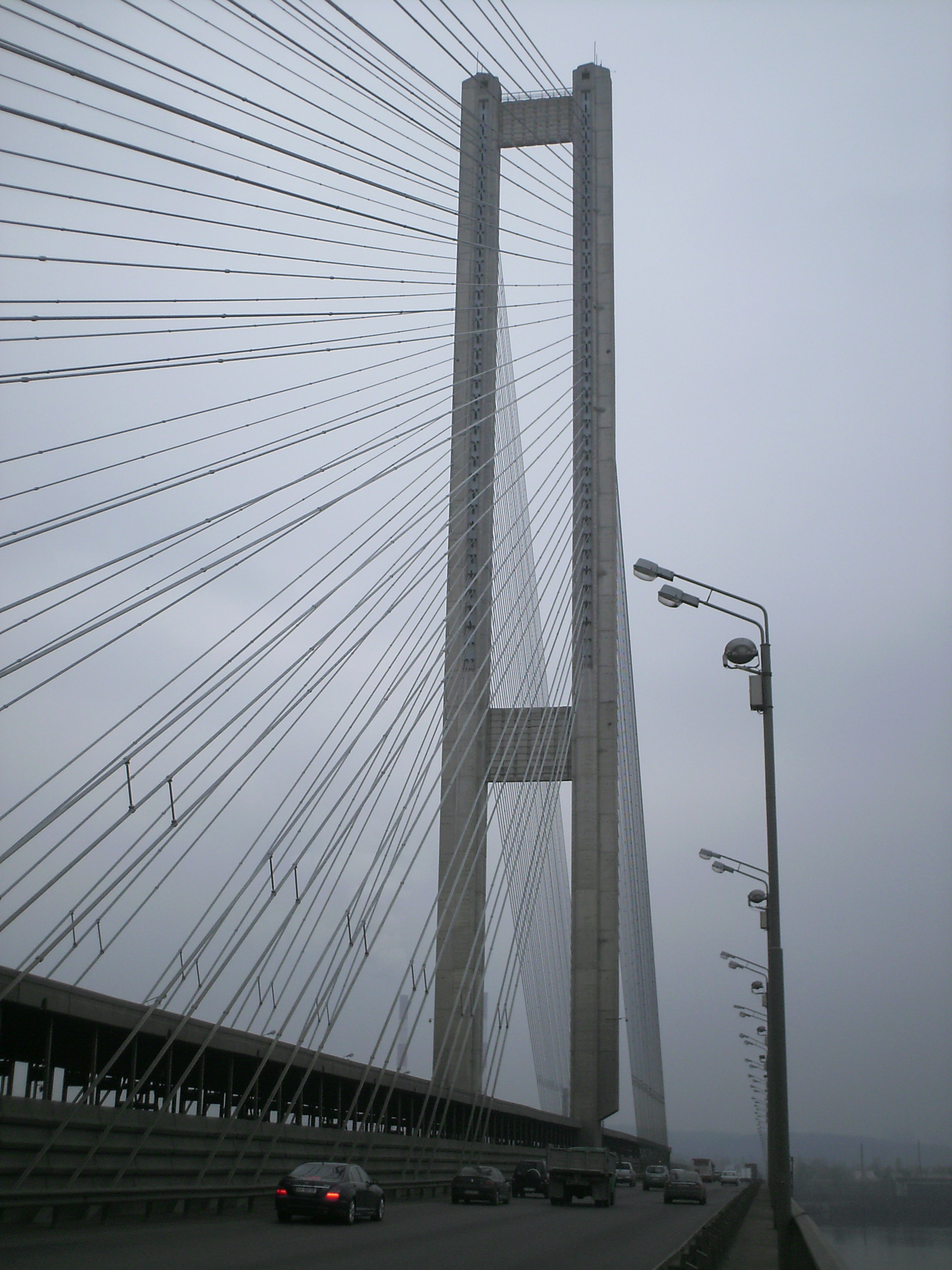
The aluminium construction of Pivdennyi Bridge can be seen on the bottom left

Despite severe economic problems at the dawn of Ukrainian independence, momentum on the Kyiv Metro construction was not lost. On 30 December 1991, Druzhby Narodiv (Now Zvirynetska) and Vydubychi stations were opened (Pecherska station was opened six years later, on 27 December 1997, since its construction had to be frozen due to hydrotechnical problems). In 1992, the line crossed the Dnieper river to Slavutych and Osokorky stations via the Pivdennyi Bridge. Initially, this bridge (which was open from the sides) was intended to be covered by an aluminium construction, but this was found to be ineffective protection against snow and rain.

While the construction of the bridge segment was in progress, Telychka station was also under construction. However, due to factory closures in the surrounding heavily industrialized area, the station construction site was abandoned. What remains of it now is a platform and a ventilation shaft, so the station can be used in emergency cases (e.g. a fire or train breakdown).

Two years later (on 28 December 1994), the M3 line was further extended to the east, when Pozniaky and Kharkivska stations were revealed to the public. Pozniaky station was the first distinctly three-floor underground station in Kyiv; the lower floor was used by the underground, while the middle and the top floors were used by small market stalls. This structure later enabled the station to easily become a transfer hub for the upcoming Livoberezhna line (M5) by replacing the stalls with passenger transfer areas. The opening of these stations was crucial for the rapidly developing Poznyaky and Kharkivskyi residential districts.

In the mid-1990s, construction of a northwestern expansion to the older Syrets district began, with the first extension made on 30 December 1996. Then, Lukianivska station became the new terminus of the line. Lvivska Brama station was also built (between Zoloti Vorota and Lukianivska), but its construction came to a halt in 1997 due to a lack of money and disagreement on how Lvivska Square should be reconstructed.

On 30 March 2000, the next station on the line, Dorohozhychi, was opened. Another station, Hertsena station (situated between Lukianivska and Dorohozhychi stations), was also planned—even potentially under initial construction—but ultimately abandoned. Neither the current official scheme (see below) nor the earlier one indicates this station.

Four years later, on 14 October 2004, the M3 line was further extended to the northwest, ending at Syrets station (still the current terminus of the line).

At the same time, works were done on the southeastern stretch of the line, with Boryspilska station opening on 23 August 2005 and Vyrlytsia opening on 7 March 2006. At first, Vyrlytsia was only an emergency exit, and the station was not planned to be built. However, the City Council later decided, in November 2005, to convert the exit into a full station, which is the reason why this station has side platforms.

On 23 August 2007, the third and newest depot in the Kyiv Metro—Kharkivske Depot—was opened.

In September 2005, construction began on Chervonyi Khutir station, the last station on the M3 line. In April 2007, the Mayor of Kyiv, Leonid Chernovetskyi, fearing the station will have low ridership, claimed the station would be subject to conservation, as "animals do not ride in the underground" (he meant that the station was situated near the forest, with not many buildings nearby, so there were no people to use the station). Nevertheless, the works continued, and, after a few months' delay, the station opened on 23 May 2008, for the Kyiv Day celebration. The timing coincided with the upcoming mayoral elections on 25 May 2008. This station had the second-lowest ridership in the Kyiv Metro as of 2017.

=== Early post-independence phase (1991–2013) ===
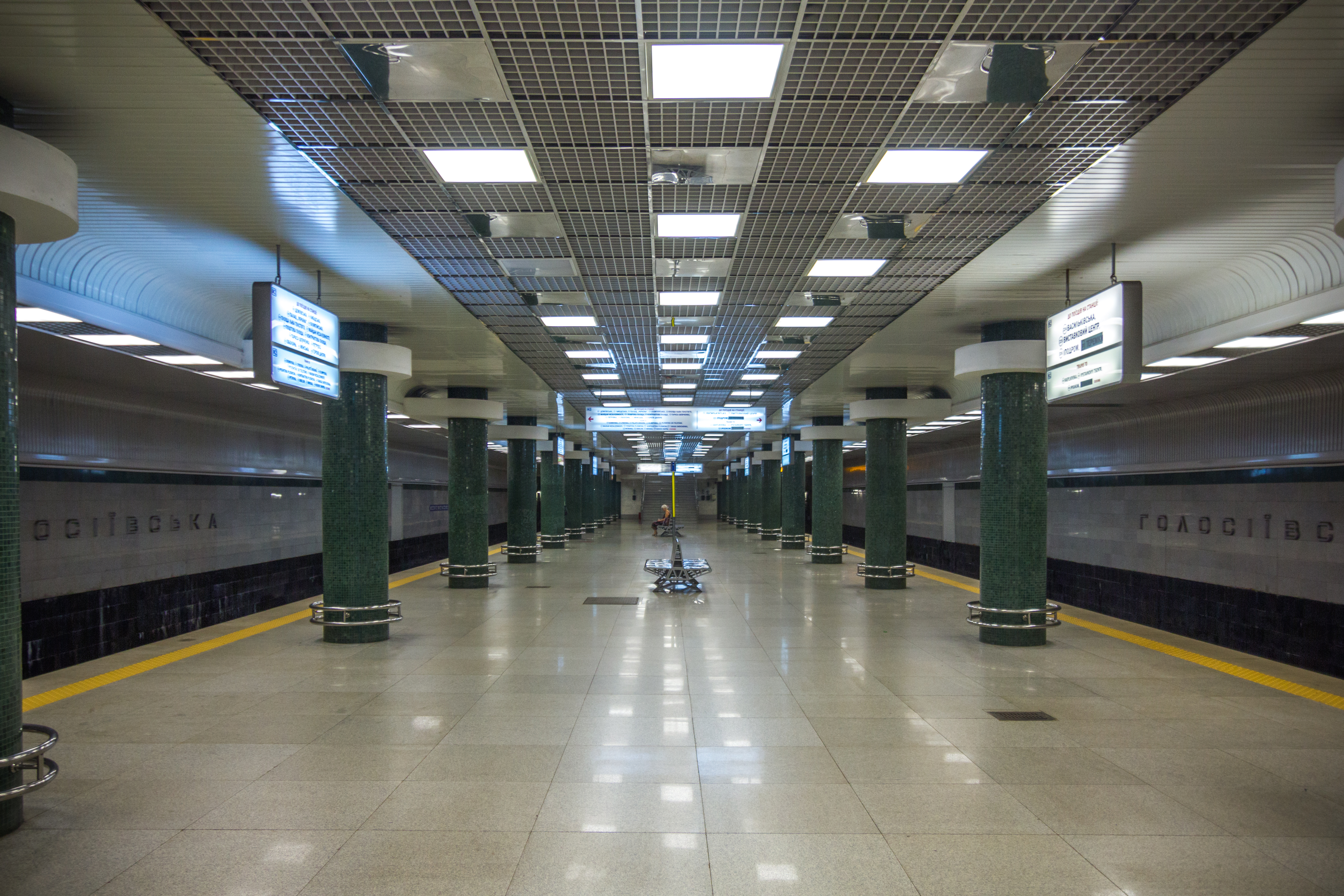
Holosiivska station

Until the 2000s, the M1 line terminated at Sviatoshyn station (renamed in 1993 from Sviatoshyno station) at the western end. However, new apartments had emerged since 1971, mostly in Bilychi and western Sviatoshyn, which created a need for an extension of the line to the housing facilities.

Construction of the 3.3 km (2.1 mi) final section of today's M1 line started in the fall of 2000. Zhytomyrska station and Akademmistechko station were built, with delays due to irregular financing. Prospect Peremohy (now Prospect Beresteiskyi) was partially closed from 14 January 2001 to 25 December 2002, to construct the tunnels beneath the street. This final extension of the M1 line was opened on 24 May 2003.

Construction of the southwestern segment of the M2 line restarted in the summer of 2005, 21 years after the Lybid river accident. Difficult terrain made the work fall behind schedule, originally the Demiivska station was planned to be opened in 2009 but the opening had to be postponed until 2010 after in 2006, one year after the construction started, the retaining wall collapsed with a gantry crane damaging city communications. Later, in 2008, the tunneling shield got stuck several times during tunnel construction. By 2009 there were five fatalities in various accidents occurred at the line's construction. On 15 December 2010, Demiivska, Holosiivska, and Vasylkivska stations were opened.

The 50th station, Vystavkovyi Tsentr, was unveiled a year later, on 27 December 2011. Ipodrom followed suit on 25 October 2012. Initially, Ipodrom was planned to be opened together with Teremky station in November 2012, but, with the lack of financing and construction delays, only Ipodrom was opened by then (ahead of schedule, partly thanks to funds reallocation, and partly because of the 2012 parliamentary elections due for 28 October). The Ipodrom–Teremky section would wait for underground construction funds until 2013. As there was no turnaround option for trains there, a shuttle train drove between Vystavkovyi Tsentr and Ipodrom stations until Teremky station was opened on 6 November 2013, to commemorate the 70th anniversary of Kyiv's liberation. As of 2026, this was the last extension or opening of any underground-connected facility (not taking into account the opening of the second exit from Osokorky station, which was built together with the station but opened only in 2014).

=== Russian full-scale invasion ===
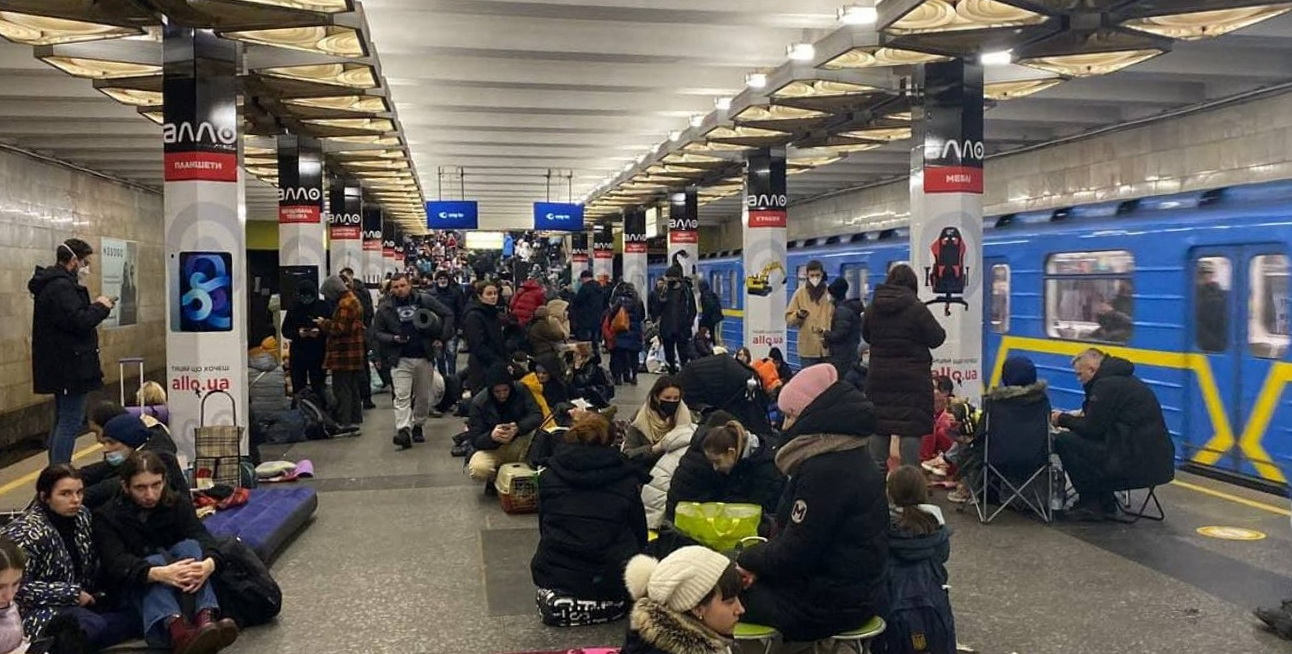
Residents sheltering in the metro during the Russian invasion of Ukraine

During the Russian invasion of Ukraine on 24 February, regular service on the metro was suspended. A reduced schedule was adopted with limited services running between 8:00 and 19:00. All underground stations (47 of the 52 total) have remained open 24 hours a day to function as bomb shelters.

In the wake of air raid missile attacks, metro stations have been often used as bomb shelters. According to Kyiv's mayor Vitali Klitschko, on 2 March 2022, as many as 150,000 residents of Kyiv sought shelter in the city's metro.

Amidst Russia's attacks on Kyiv, there have been cases of metro stations getting damaged. Lukyanivska metro station was damaged 15 March 2022 and had to temporarily stop operation for repair. On 29 December 2023, the station was damaged again.

On 8 July 2024, people had to be evacuated from Lukyanivska metro station because of another air strike and the open part of M1 line had to be temporarily closed to remove the dangerous objects.

On 2 September 2024, Sviatoshyn metro station was damaged in an air strike.

On 1 January 2025, one of the vestibules of Khreshchatyk metro station was damaged by a kamikaze drone.

On 18 January 2025, a rocket fell near the Lukyanivska metro station, damaging its vestibule and city communications and killing three people. The station got damaged again on 24 April.

=== Metro tunnels flooding in 2023 ===
On 8 December 2023, ten years after the controversial construction of metro to Teremky was finished, Kyiv City Council informed that the tunnel of the second line between Lybidska and Demiivska stations has been depressurized and the rails are flooded. Because of this accident the rest of the line which led to Teremky had to be closed, it caused serious transportation problems since that metro line was the main mode of transport in that part of the city.

The next day after the announcement similar problems have been discovered on the other end of the line at the Pochaina station which was built in 1980.

On 9 December, Prime Minister of Ukraine Denys Shmyhal gathered an emergency meeting of the State Commission on Emergency Situations regarding the accident. Police initiated searches of the engineering organisation responsible for the tunnels, administration of Kyiv Metro and Kyiv City Council, obtaining the construction documents for the investigation of the negligence case.

On 13 December, the so-called 'shuttle traffic' began to operate, so the second line was split in two separate parts with a tunnel reconstruction site between them, buses had been launched to replace the full line.

On 17 December, the buildings of an abandoned Demiivskyi market which was located at the top of the damaged tunnel began to subside.

On 18 December, the administration of Kyiv Metro announced that the repair works between Tarasa Shevchenka and Pochaina stations will start in the summer of 2024 but they won't need the train movement to be stopped. The same day Kyivpastrans announced compensation for e-tickets spent on transfer between 'shuttle traffic'.

On 22 December the tender on tunnel reconstruction was announced at Prozorro, it was won by Autostrada infrastructural construction company. The plan was to finish the works in Autumn.

On 24 January 2024, Kyiv Department of Transport Infrastructure announced that by the results of the expertise the cause of the accident was a bad quality of the project and construction work.

On 3 March 2024, in response to various claims about Kyiv Metro being in danger of a major flooding, Mayor of Kyiv Vitaly Klitschko stated that such claims are being made only by people who are uneducated in the sphere of transport infrastructure.

On 10 April, the tender on tunnel inspection had been won by Archbudzem company from Buky, Zhytomyr Oblast.

The work on old tunnel dismantlement began in April, the structure was opened on 29 April and lasted until 5 June.

In May State Audit Service of Ukraine stated that they had been warning the Kyiv City State Administration about possible similar problems at Poshtova Ploshcha since 2023 but were ignored. Press service of the administration responded that the inspection of the station didn't find any problems.

On 24 July 2024 Kyiv City Prosecutor's Office announced that they never received a result of Kyiv Metro's expertise and that the flooding was caused not by a construction mistakes but rather by improper operation of the tunnels. It was discovered that the tunnel isolation checks in 2011-2023 never included specialists from research institutes.

On 11 September 2024, the reconstruction of the tunnel was announced to be complete, and the Obolonsko–Teremkivska line continued operating as normal starting from the next day.

== Modernization ==
=== Rolling stock ===
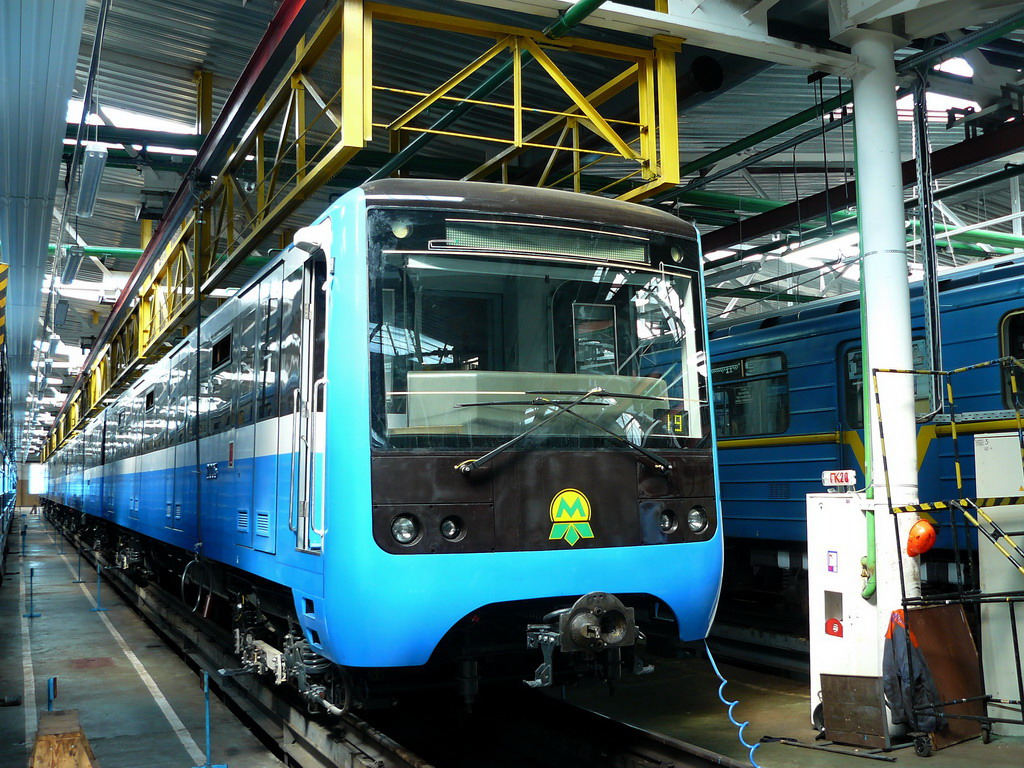
A new generation (81–7021) Kyiv metro train being prepared for use in its depot

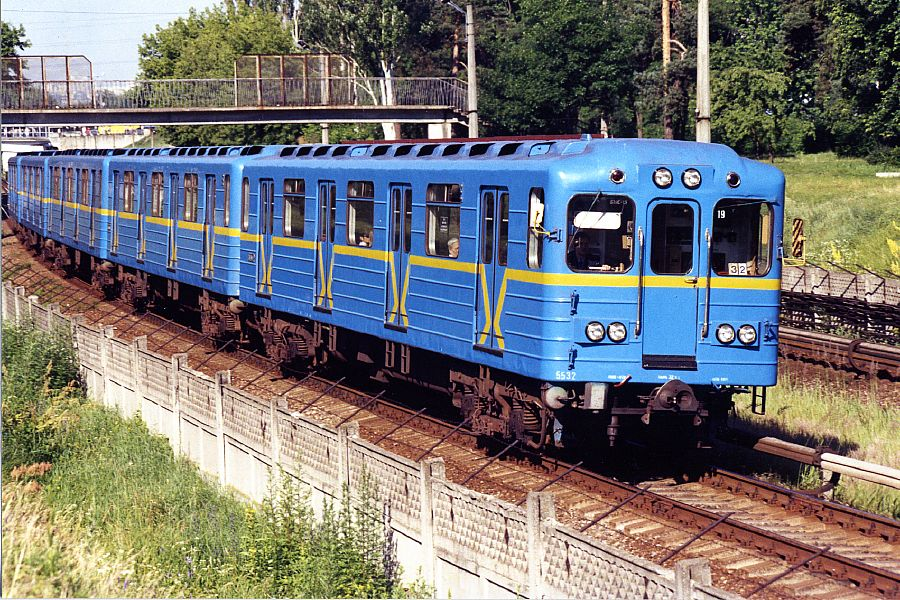
A Ezh-type train on the M1 line

In the 1990s, the Kyiv Metro authority was mostly concerned with new underground construction, rather than old infrastructure modernization. This changed in March 2001, when an experimental modification of 81-717/714 trains, the Slavutych 81-553.1/554.1/555.1 wagon, was launched from Obolon depot. It included an increased number of electronic devices and induction motors (instead of synchronous motors in earlier series). The train model, however, was not released into mass production, so the test train remained the only one from its series. This experimental 81-553.1 train was operated on the Obolonsko–Teremkivska line between 2001 - 2011 because of maintenance and due to fact the Vagonmash closed in 2013, and parts that were produced are no longer to be produced, and it was placed into storage in Tch-2 Obolon depot.

The modification of 81-717/714 (81-717.5М/714.5М) trains arrived three years later at the Darnytsia depot.

Another modification of the 81-717/714 series, the 81-7021–7022, made by the Kryukiv wagon-manufacturing plant (KVBZ), would be the first underground train made in Ukraine in the Kyiv Metro. This new model was first unveiled to the then-President of Ukraine, Viktor Yushchenko, at the opening of the Boryspilska station. Five months later, a sample was sent to the Darnytsia depot for trials, where an error was detected. Further tests were conducted from 17 June 2006 in the Obolon depot. Finally, in July 2008, the trains were accepted by the governmental commission and were given a special license allowing them to be mass-produced (following Ukrainian technical standards). They started carrying passengers in 2009. 81-7021–7022 trains were supposed to substitute the older 81-717/714 trains, but, as of 5 July 2017, there was only one train of such a model.

The next modified trains, 81-540.2К/81-714.5М, made by Wagonmash (St. Peterburg) and Metrowagonmash, are another modification of 81-717/714, arrived in 2010, with additional trains set on rails in 2013.

Finally, in 2014–2016, new 81-7080 trains were transported from KVBZ to the Kyiv Metro, which is now actively used on the M1 line.

In 2023, Warsaw Metro donated 60 cars of its decommissioned 81-717/714 series trains to Kyiv Metro. They will be used as parts donors to overhaul the existing rolling stock or enter passenger service to strengthen the current fleet. The first set entered service on the M3 Line on 1 November 2023.

=== Stations ===
In October 2005, new escalators were installed in Lisova and Syrets stations, as a movement for modernization in the former case, and the latter as part of a pylon station's equipment.

The following year, Darnytsia station was modernized, and a second exit (towards Popudrenka Street) was built.

In March–May 2017, a ₴24.84 million hryvnias (US$915,900) refurbishment of Livoberezhna station was made due to the second Eurovision session in Kyiv.

== Infrastructure ==
=== Lines ===
As of 2026, three lines are operational, with a total length of 67.6 km (42.00 mi). The additional 2.048 km (1.27 mi) that appear in the table account for technical tunnels, used by trains to switch from one line to another.

Livery and #	Name	Name in Ukrainian Cyrillic	Date of first station opening	Most recent station opening	Length (km [mi])	Number of stations	Frequency	Ride time (terminus to terminus)
Line 1 icon	Line 1 (Sviatoshynsko–Brovarska)	Лінія 1 (Святошинсько–Броварська)	6 November 1960	24 May 2003	22.65 (14.07)	18	Rush hour: 1:45-2 min Normal and weekend: 3:30 min	38:30 min
Line 2 icon	Line 2 (Obolonsko–Teremkivska)	Лінія 2 (Оболонсько–Теремківська)	17 December 1976	6 November 2013	20.95 (13.02)	18	Rush hour: 1:45-2:15 min* Normal: 5 min Weekend: 4-4:30 min	35:15 min
Line 3 icon	Line 3 (Syretsko–Pecherska)	Лінія 3 (Сирецько–Печерська)	31 December 1989	23 May 2008	23.9 (14.85)	16	Rush hour: 2-2:30 min* Normal: 4:15-5 min Weekend: 6 min	40:30 min
Total:					67.6 (42.00)	52		
Line 4 icon	Line 4 (Podilsko–Vyhurivska)	Лінія 4 (Подільсько–Вигурівська)	Under construction (groundwork frozen) (Planned opening: after 2027)		ca. 20 (12.4) (full line)	15 (planned)	*- Intervals on "Teremky" - "Vasylkivska" section (line 2), "Syrets"-"Lukianivska" (line 3) and "Kharkivska"-"Chervonyi Khutir" (line 3) is double during rush hours.	n/a
Line 5 icon	Line 5 (Livoberezhna)	Лінія 5 (Лівобережна)	Planned (Orientational period of opening: TBD)		4.96 (3.08) (first phase)	17 (planned)	*- Intervals on "Teremky" - "Vasylkivska" section (line 2), "Syrets"-"Lukianivska" (line 3) and "Kharkivska"-"Chervonyi Khutir" (line 3) is double during rush hours.	n/a
Line 6 icon	Line 6 (Vyshhorodsko–Darnytska)	Лінія 6 (Вишгородсько–Дарницька)	Planned (Orientational period of opening: TBD)		27 (16.78) (full line)	19 (planned)	*- Intervals on "Teremky" - "Vasylkivska" section (line 2), "Syrets"-"Lukianivska" (line 3) and "Kharkivska"-"Chervonyi Khutir" (line 3) is double during rush hours.	n/a
Total	6 lines planned				ca. 120 (75)	103		

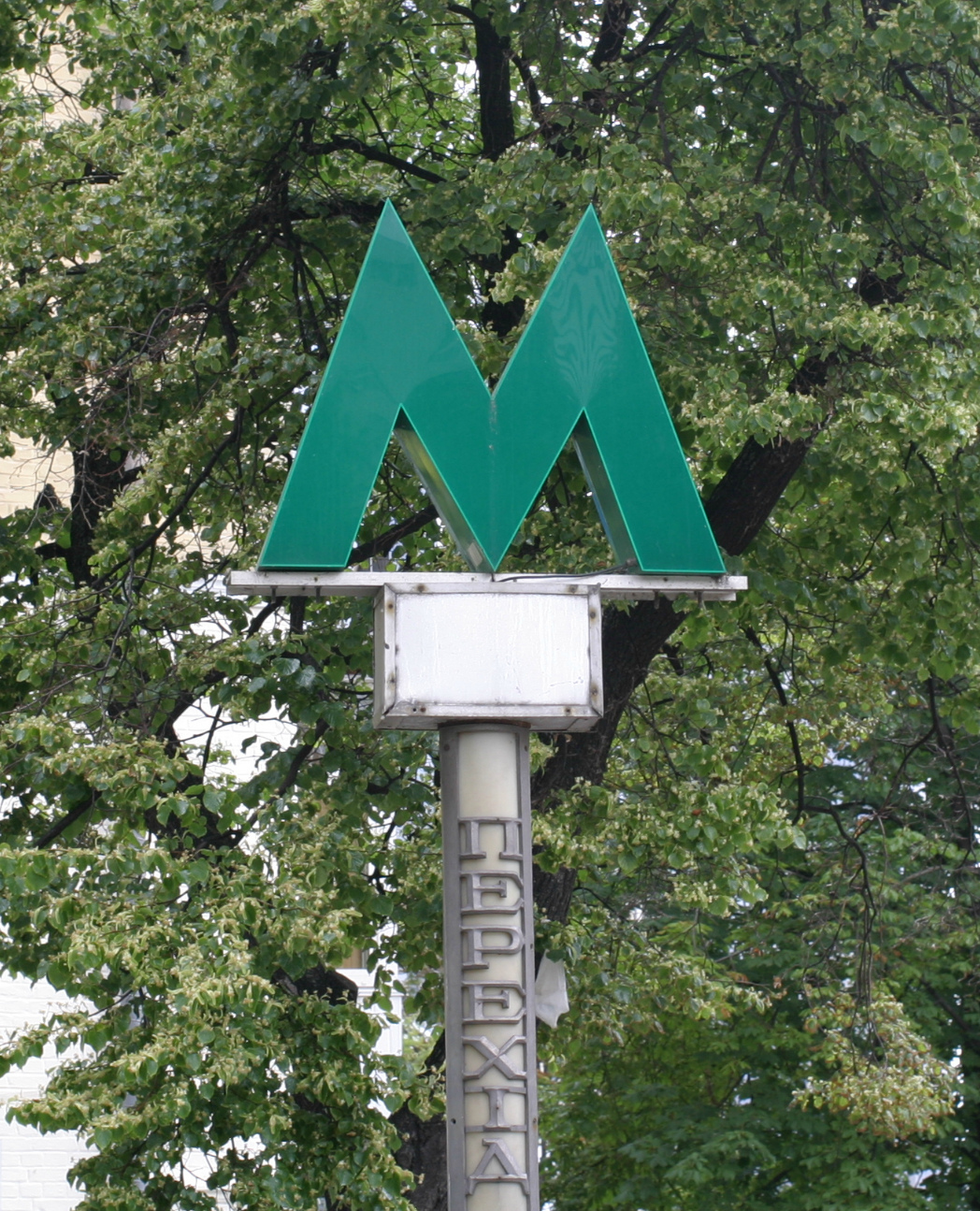
A Kyiv Metro station sign

The lines' names are derived from the terminal stations proposed in the original 1945 construction plan, which is why the M1 line is called "Sviatoshynsko–Brovarska", despite finishing 11 kilometers short of Brovary's city center (the official Metro site says "the extension to Brovary is possible in far future"). Similarly, the M2 line's route does not pass through Kurenivka. In February 2018, the Kyiv City Council renamed the M2 line from "Kurenivsko–Chervonoarmiyska" to "Obolonsko–Teremkivska".

Colloquially, lines are rarely referred to by their full names, but rather by their numbers or colors (e.g. the "Syretsko–Pecherska line" is usually referred to as "The Third line" or "The Green line").

==== Line 1 (Sviatoshynsko-Brovarska) ====
The Sviatoshynsko–Brovarska line is the first line of the Kyiv Metro, with a length of 22.7 km (14.1 mi). All of its stations on the eastern bank of the Dnieper river are either at or above ground level, this is attributed to a similar experiment to Moscow's Filyovskaya Line. The milder Ukrainian climate, however, prevented these stations from severely deteriorating, which was why extensions in 1968 and 1979 were kept from going underground. The five original stations on this line managed to survive Nikita Khrushchev's struggle with decorative "extras", although more pompous projects were proposed in Stalin's time. These five stations are recognized as architectural monuments and thus are protected by the state. The M1 line is colored red on maps and carries about 550,000 passengers daily, making it the busiest line.

==== Line 2 (Obolonsko–Teremkivska) ====
The Obolonsko–Teremkivska line was the second line of the Kyiv Metro, with a length of 20.95 km (13.02 mi). Initially, it extends southwards along the right bank of the Dnieper river but deviates from the river towards the southwest beyond Lybidska station. Most of this line's stations were built in the 1970s and 1980s. Architecturally, the line shows some of the best examples of late-Soviet architectural features (with Lybidska station being an architectural monument protected by the state). The line's newest stations, built-in 2010–2013, are a good example of modern stations with national decoration motifs (such as at Teremky station) and have access for disabled persons. The M2 line is colored blue on maps and carries more than 460,000 passengers daily.

==== Line 3 (Syretsko-Pecherska) ====
The Syretsko-Pecherska Line is the third and longest line in the Kyiv Metro, with a length of 23.9 km (14.9 mi). It is a major northwest–southeast axis of the Kyiv rapid transit system. It starts on the western side of the Dnieper river before crossing it on a partially covered bridge and then going on to the southeastern residential districts of Kyiv. The line is the newest and shows some post-independence decorative motifs. Technically, it is also a great development, with most of the platforms longer and wider than older sections and with some stations having access for disabled persons. The Vydubychi–Slavutych tunnel is the longest in the Kyiv Metro, as 3.046 km (1.893 mi) separates the two stations. This is partial because several stations were not completed—two stations had construction suspended (and never finished) while another station was only planned. The M3 line is colored green on maps and carries more than 300,000 passengers daily.

=== Stations ===
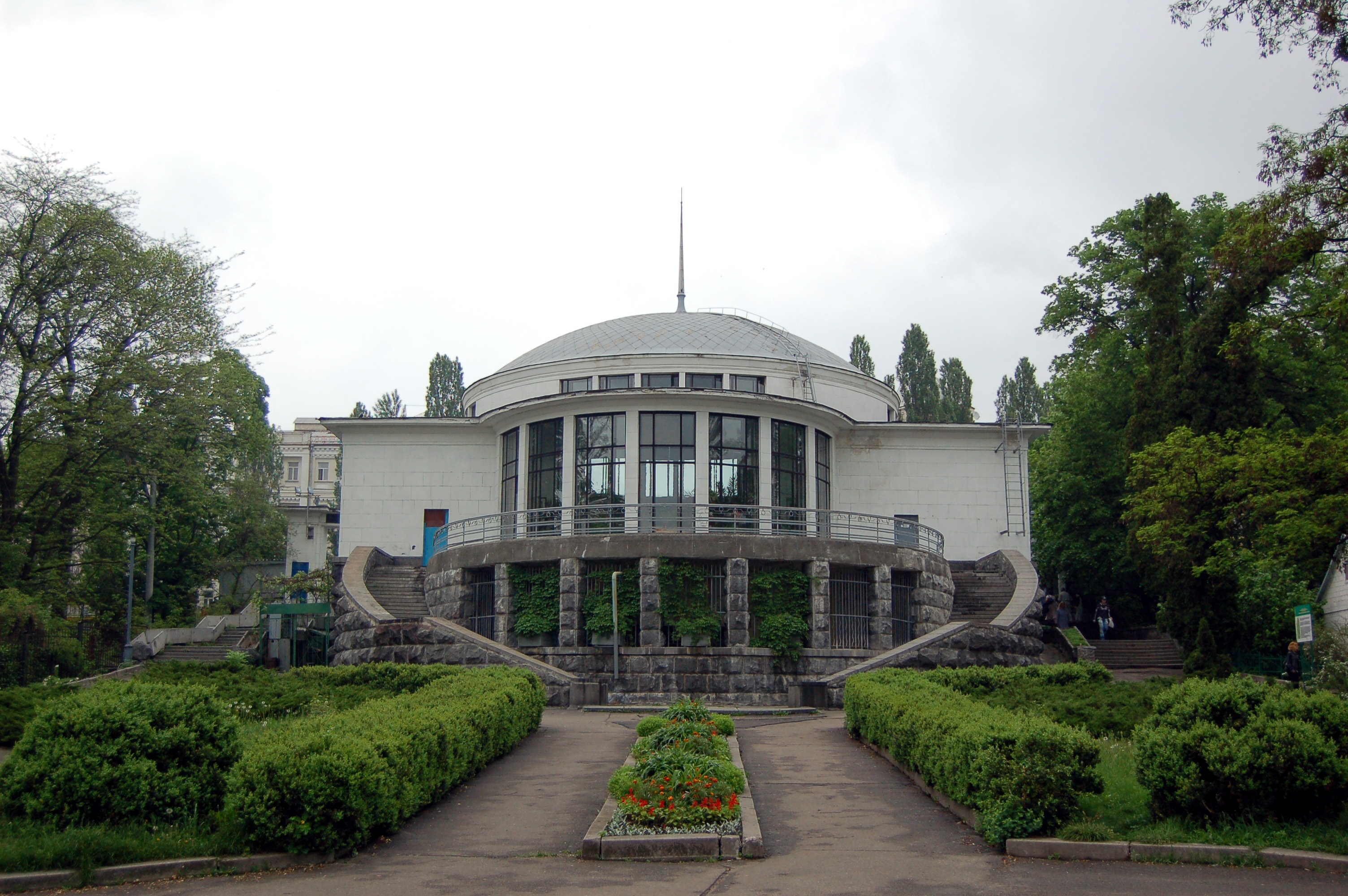
Universytet station's vestibule is recognized as an outstanding architectural monument of Kyiv

The Kyiv Metro follows a standard Soviet design: a triangular layout of three lines that intersect in the city center, making six radii, and stations that are built very deep underground and could potentially double as bomb shelters.

==== Technical data ====
Currently, there are 52 stations. There are 20 deep-lying stations, of which 17 are of pylon type (including Arsenalna station, the only "London style" station in the former USSR still in existence) and 3 are of column type. Of the 26 sub-surface stations, 13 stations are of pillar-trispan type, 3 are side-platform pillar bi-spans, 8 are single-vaults, and 3 are asymmetrical double-deck bi-spans. In addition, 6 stations are located above ground; of these, four are surface level and two are flyover. Most of the stations have large vestibules, some on the surface level whilst others are underground and interlinked via subways. Access for disabled persons, previously overlooked, has become an important issue, and all new stations have been constructed with the necessary provisions.

Arsenalna station is distinguished as the deepest station in the world, at 105.5 m below ground (considering the distance between the surface above the station and the station itself). Dnipro, the next station proceeding towards Dnieper, is overground, which gives the Dnipro–Arsenalna tunnel the largest elevation difference between metro stations in the world, considering the surface's relative height.

There are three unfinished stations: Lvivska Brama, Telychka, and Hertsena, all of which are on the green M3 line. Hertsena had only the initial stages of construction completed, while the former two are more advanced in construction (about 30–70% completed) but lack conventional exits.

Kyiv Metro is poorly adapted for handicapped persons. Only stations constructed after 2005 are better adapted for handicapped people; for example, they have elevators and turnstiles wide enough for a wheelchair to pass.

==== Architecture ====
Like all the Metro systems of the former Soviet Union, the Kyiv Metro is known for its vivid and colorful decorations. The original stations from the first stage of construction are elaborately decorated, showing the postwar Stalinist architecture blended with traditional Ukrainian motifs. Many first projects for stations offered at the beginning of the 1950s were full of rich decorative elements such as mosaics, ornaments, bas-reliefs, sculptures, and marble.

Each station was to have its original shape. These stations were to be constructed in a monumental style like those stations built throughout the 1950s in Moscow and Leningrad. For example, Arsenalna station, instead of a small central hall, should have had a wide hall with sculptures of warriors of the Russian Civil War and World War II; Vokzalna station was to be decorated with ornaments and bas-reliefs on columns and a big decorative map of the Ukrainian SSR; and, based on its first project drawings, Politeckhnichniy Institut station was to have large mosaic panels depicting aspects of the natural sciences.

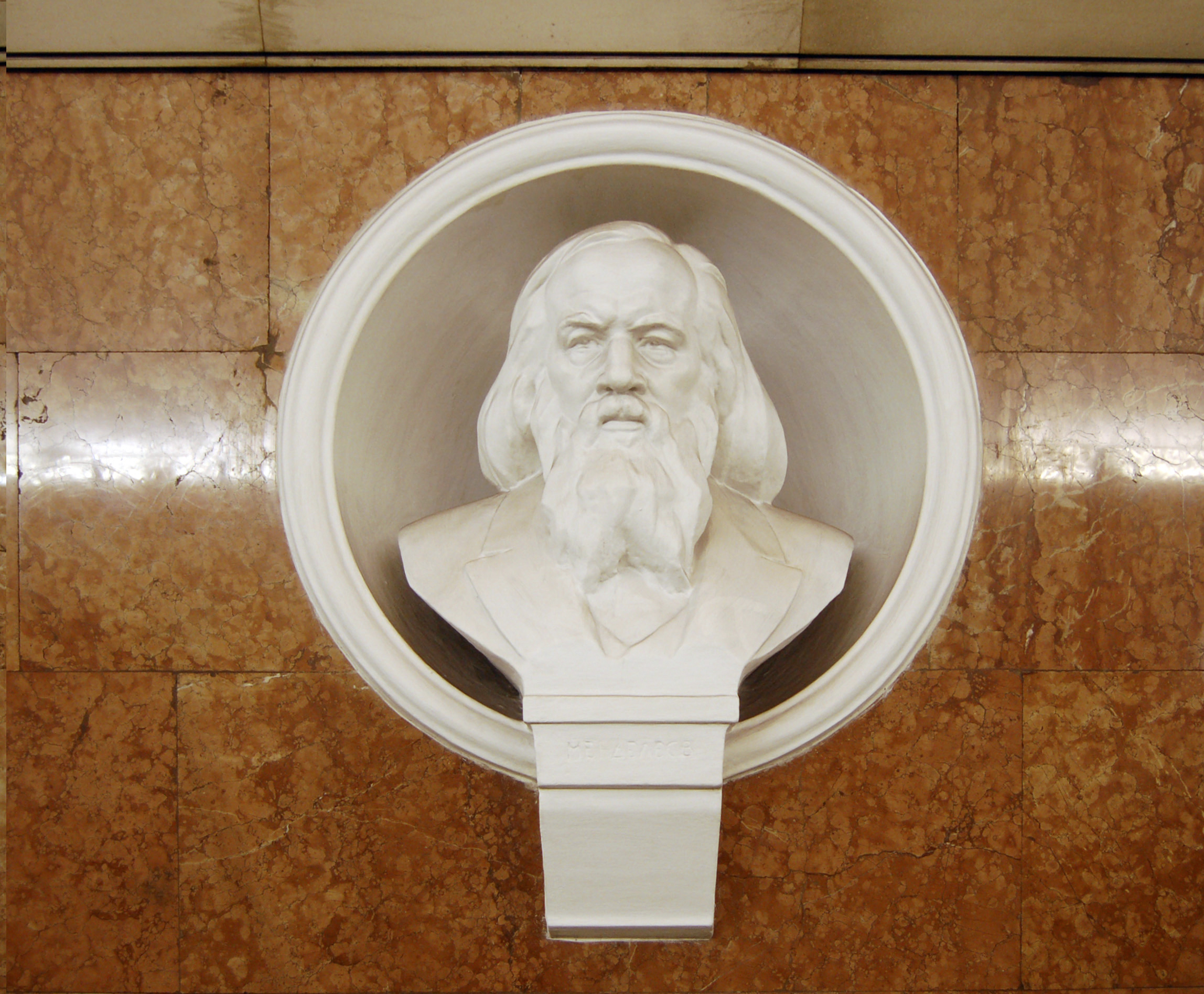
A bust of Russian chemist Dmitri Mendeleev in Universytet station

By the end of the 1950s, a period of functionality and struggle against architectural extravagances had begun in Soviet architecture. This action, propagated by Khrushchev, resulted in the loss of many unique projects, with the resulting stations being finished with few decorations, compared to the 1952 projects. Universytet station, however, was less simplified than many others and retained its many pylons adorned with the busts of famous scientists and writers. The next stations which opened in 1963 had an ascetic and strict appearance. Open-air stations of the 1960s and the underground stations of 1971 were built to a standard primitive design called sorokonozhka (Russian: sorokonozhka, lit. 'centipede'), named for the many thin supports on both sides of the platform. Functionality became the most important factor in newer designs, and stations built at that time were almost identical in appearance, save the design of tile patterns and pillar covering material. Only in the 1970s did decorative architecture start to make a recovery. The stations built from the 1980s onwards show more innovative designs.

Some older stations have undergone upgrades to lighting and renovation of some decorative materials. After the declaration of Ukrainian independence following the dissolution of the Soviet Union in 1991, some of the Soviet symbols originally incorporated into decor were adapted to modern times or removed altogether by altering the station's architecture. Most remaining (if not all) Soviet symbols were later removed due to 2015 decommunization laws.

Kyiv Metro station architecture
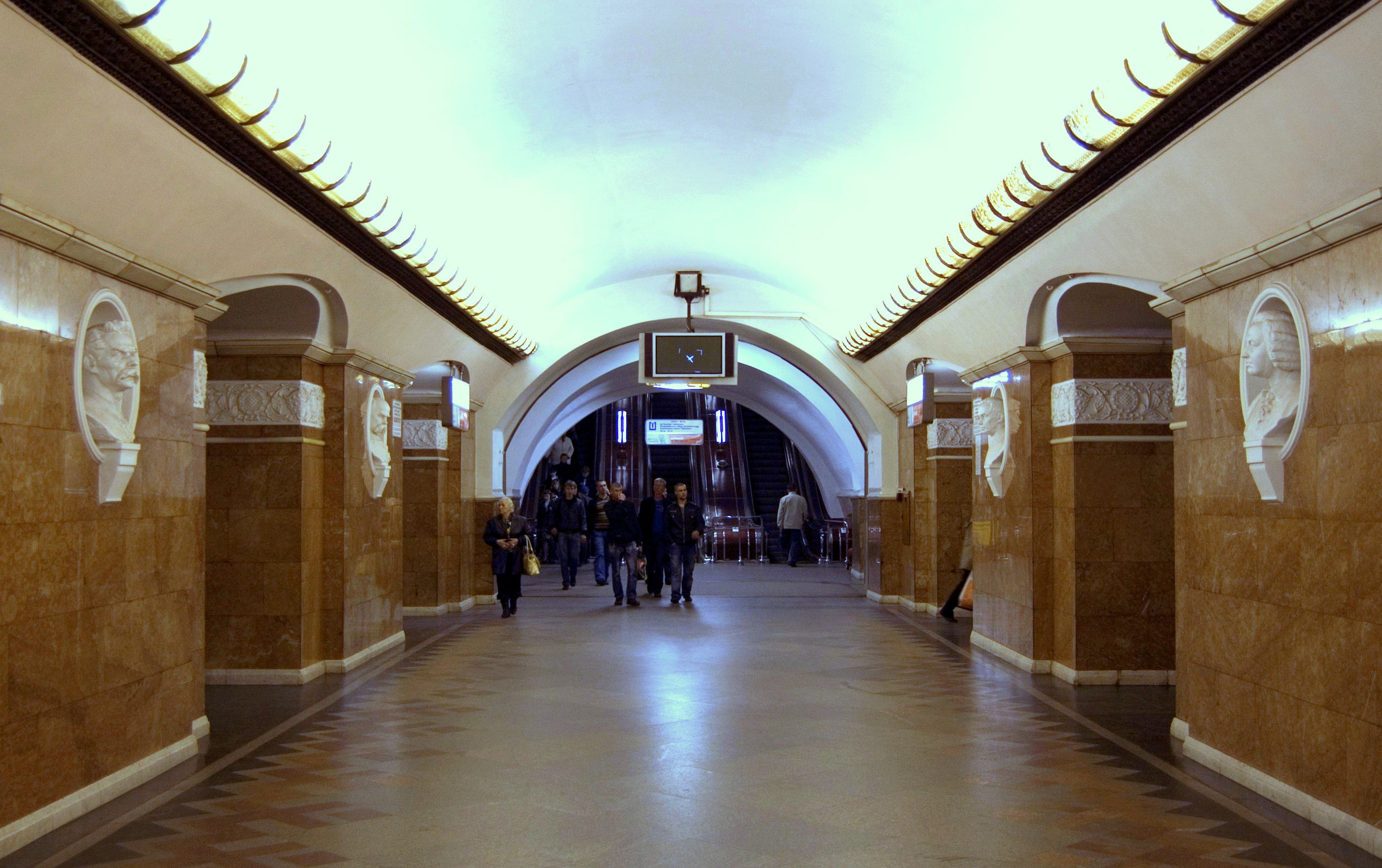
Universytet is an earlier, more ornate station from the 1960s.

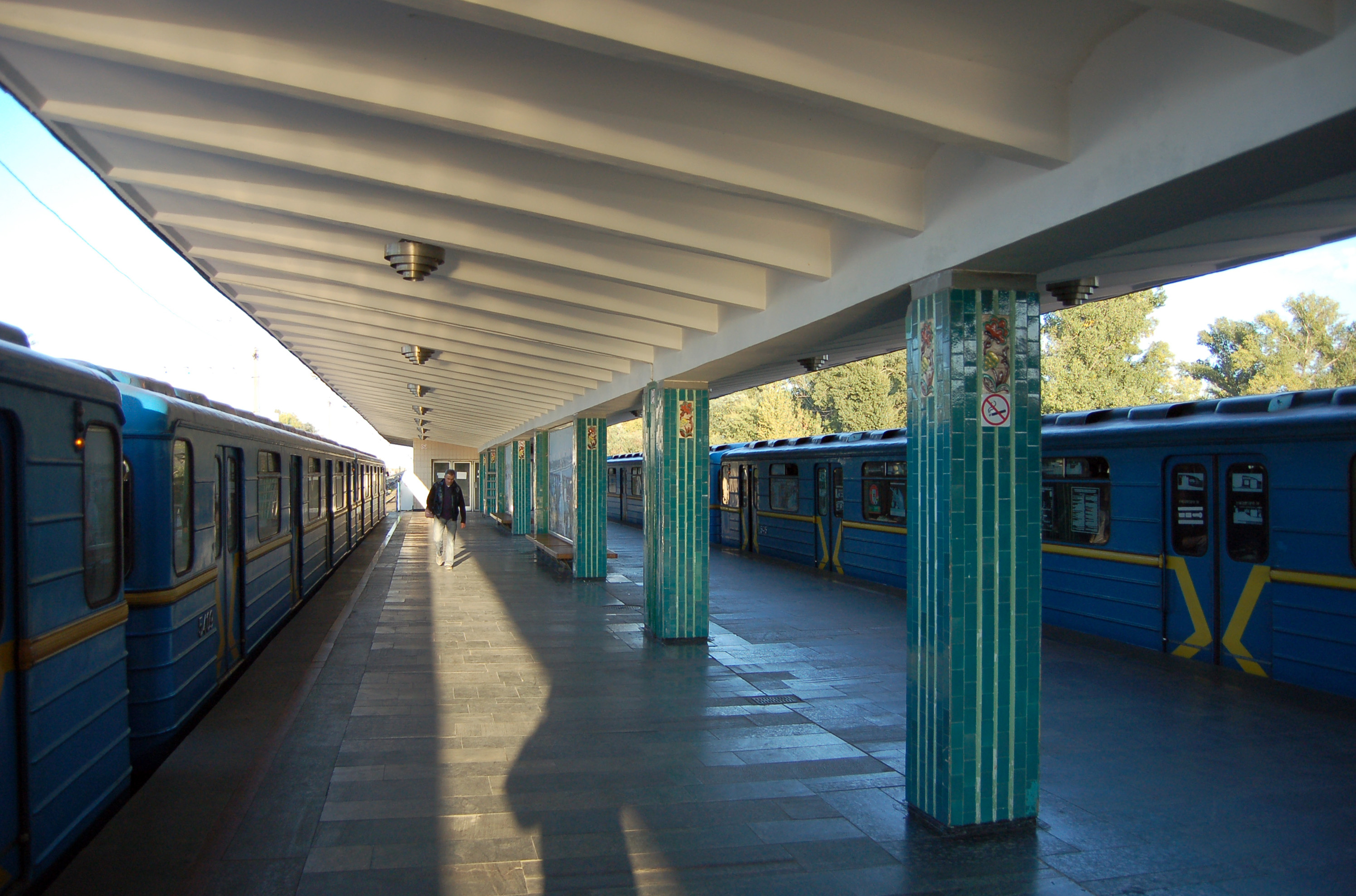
Hidropark, opened in 1965, is one of a small number of above-ground stations.

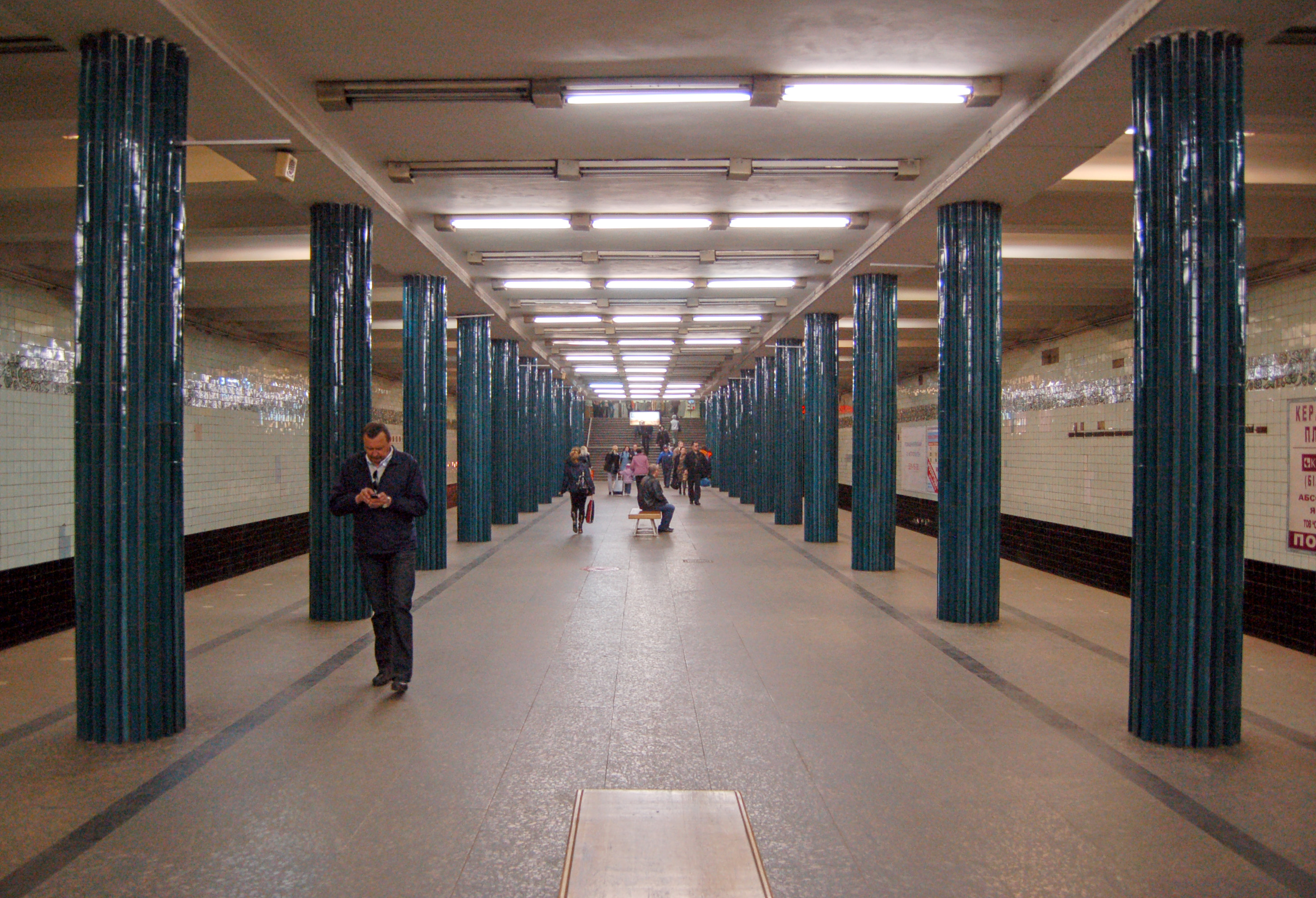
Nyvky is a typical 1970s 'centipede' style station.

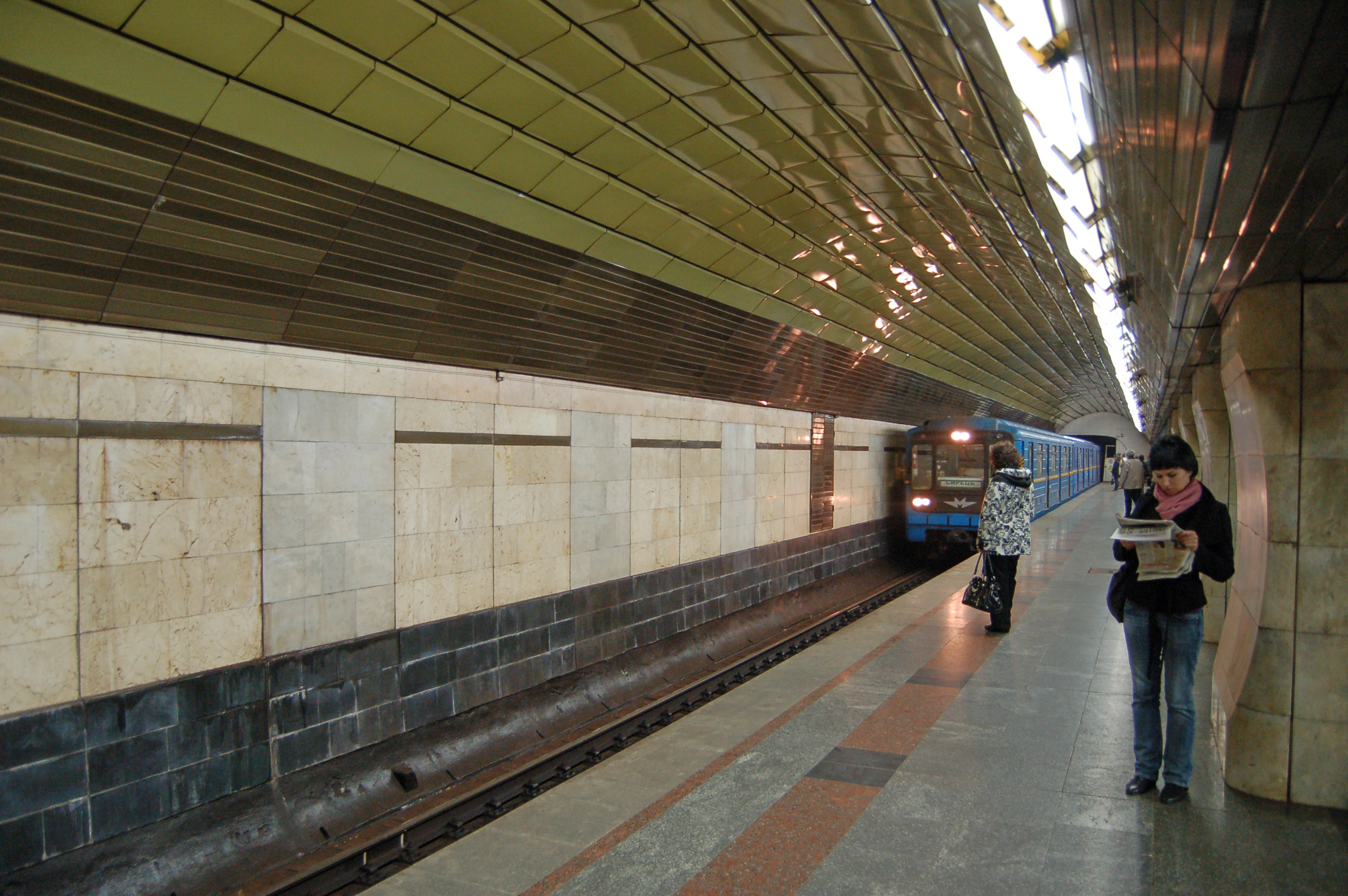
Klovska is a good example of a typical late 1980s Kyiv metro station.

==== Passenger flow ====
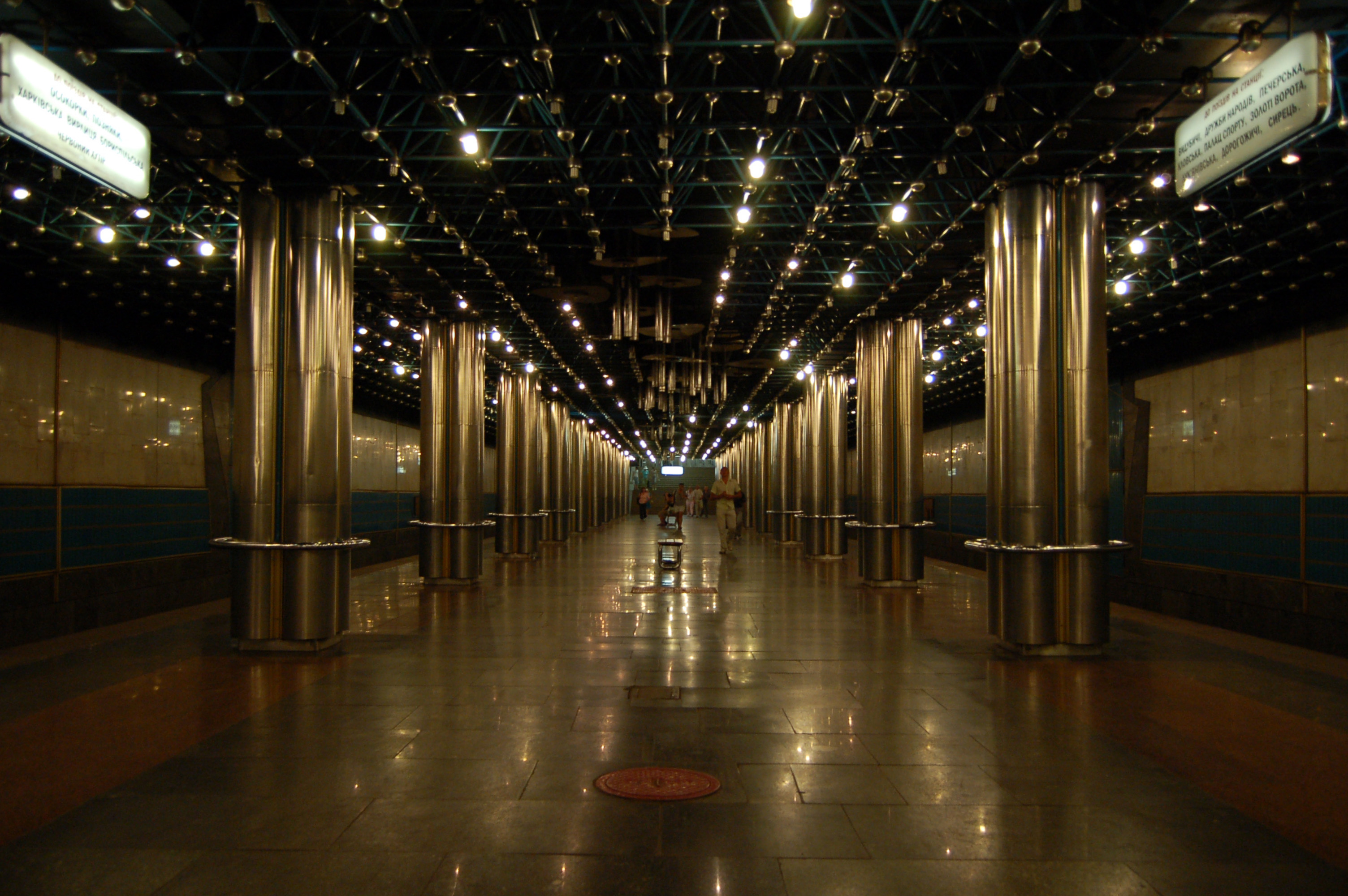
Slavutych metro station of Syretsko-Pecherska Line

As of 2015, Lisova was the busiest station in the Kyiv Metro, passing an average of 58,500 passengers per day, with Vokzalna following second with 55,900. The congestion at Vokzalna station, especially during rush hours, is particularly problematic due to the station having only 3 escalators and only one access point for entering and exiting the station. Akademmistechko is third at 51,100. These are the only stations that handle more than 50,000 passengers per day. The next busiest, Livoberezhna, passes 48,100 passengers per day. All four of these busiest stations are on the red M1 line.

The fifth busiest station is Pochaina with 46,200 passengers per day (on the blue M2 line), with Minska not far behind at 45,500. On the Syretsko-Pecherska line, the busiest station is Lukianivska, with just under 40,000.

In contrast, the least busy station in the system is the Dnipro station (M1), with only 2,800 passengers per day. Chervonyi Khutir (M3) is another station with a daily passenger flow of less than 5,000. The emptiest station on the M2 line is Poshtova Ploshcha, with 8,900 passengers per day.

==== Transfer hubs to other lines and other means of rapid transit ====
Vokzalna station is one of the most important transport hubs in the Kyiv Metro. It gives direct access to the Kyiv-Pasazhyrskyi railway station, the largest train station in Ukraine, as well as to the Kyiv Light Rail line to Borshchahivka and the Kyiv Urban Electric Train ring.

Additional important transport hubs include Demiivska station (to the Kyiv Central bus station); Vystavkovyi Tsentr and Lisova stations (mostly to suburban buses, but to the Pivdenna and Darnytsia bus stations as well, respectively); and Livoberezhna, Darnytsia, and Pochaina stations, used by commuting passengers from Troieshchyna (the largest residential district in Kyiv).

==== Distribution of stations across the city ====
Metro stations cover all 10 subdivisions of Kyiv; however, their spread is uneven. Shevchenkivskyi district has the most, at 13 stations; Pecherskyi and Holosiivskyi raions both boast 11 stops; Darnytskyi district has 7; Obolonskyi, Sviatoshynskyi, and Dniprovskyi districts each feature 4; Podilskyi district offers 3; and Desnyanskyi raion, despite being the most populous district in Kyiv, is relatively deprived of Metro connections, with only 2 stations.

This distribution reveals that the western side of Kyiv contains the majority of stations (including the M2 line, which does not cross to the eastern side of the Dnieper). Only 12 stations reside in the eastern part of the city, compared to 40 on the western side.

=== Rolling stock ===
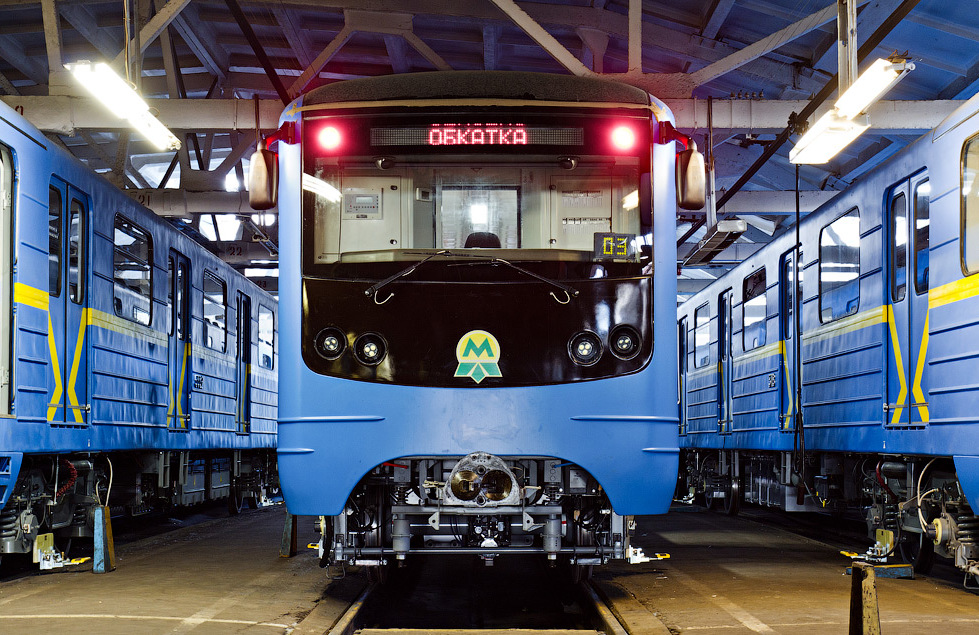
A modernized E-type train of the Kyiv Metro

As of 2016, there were 824 wagons in operation, with another 5 spares. Most of the wagons are from the Soviet era, largely from the 81-717/714 series and some trains from the older D-type and E-type series. The stock, however, is refreshed. The "Slavutych" trains began to replace the old trains of predominantly 81/7021-7022, 81-540.2К/81-714.5М, and 81–7080 series. The metro's first line was served by carriages of D-type since its opening. In 1969, all these carriages were given to Saint Petersburg Metro. In exchange, the line received carriages of series E-type, and later carriages of series Em-501, Ema-502, and Ezh (Ezh1). In 2014, most carriages of types E and Ezh were modernized with new engines, interiors, and exteriors, converting them into a type similar to type 81-7021–7022; these are known as type 81-7080–7081 or E-KM.

All of the trains contain an audio system, which announces the stations and transfer opportunities to other Metro lines. At Arsenalna station, there is an announcement for museums in the area. In addition, most of the older trains are fitted with an overhead video information system, which provides visual information to passengers regarding the current and the next stations and transfer opportunities between lines. While the train is in transit between stations, the system displays advertising (both in video and ticker forms), recreational video content, and local time.

Kyiv Metro also has some special service trains, namely:

- Two trains checking the electrical system of the Kyiv Metro, which were conventional D-type and E-type trains before conversion
- A D-type car that measures tracks' length
- Laboratory car based on an Ezh-type train
- An E-type freight car
- A track repair vehicle

In December 2016, the Kyiv City Council announced that intended to buy 709 new trains by 2025 for ₴14.96 billion (US$572.6 million at the time). Of these, 276 would replace older trains whose operation terms have expired, 62 would be added to the Syretsko-Pecherska line to ensure regular scheduling, and 371 would be introduced across newer sections of the metro system.

After a visit of the Mayor of Kyiv Vitali Klitschko to Warsaw in January 2023, he said that Warsaw will donate 60 81-717/713 wagons to the Kyiv Metro.

==== In operation ====
Picture	Type	Manufacturer	Since
	Ezh, E, Ema-502	(Soviet Union) Metrowagonmash	1970
	81-717; 81-717.5; 81-717.5М; 81-717.5K; 81-717.3, 572	(Soviet Union) Metrowagonmash (Russia) Vagonmash	1978; 1989; 1995; 2013; 2023
	81-7021	(Ukraine) KVBZ	2005
	81-540.2K	(Russia) Vagonmash	2008
	E-KM	(Ukraine) KVBZ	2014

==== Out of operation ====
Picture	Type	Manufacturer	Operation
	D	(Soviet Union) Metrowagonmash	1960–1969
	81-553 Slavutich	(Russia) Vagonmash (Czech Republic) Škoda	2001–2010

== Travelling ==
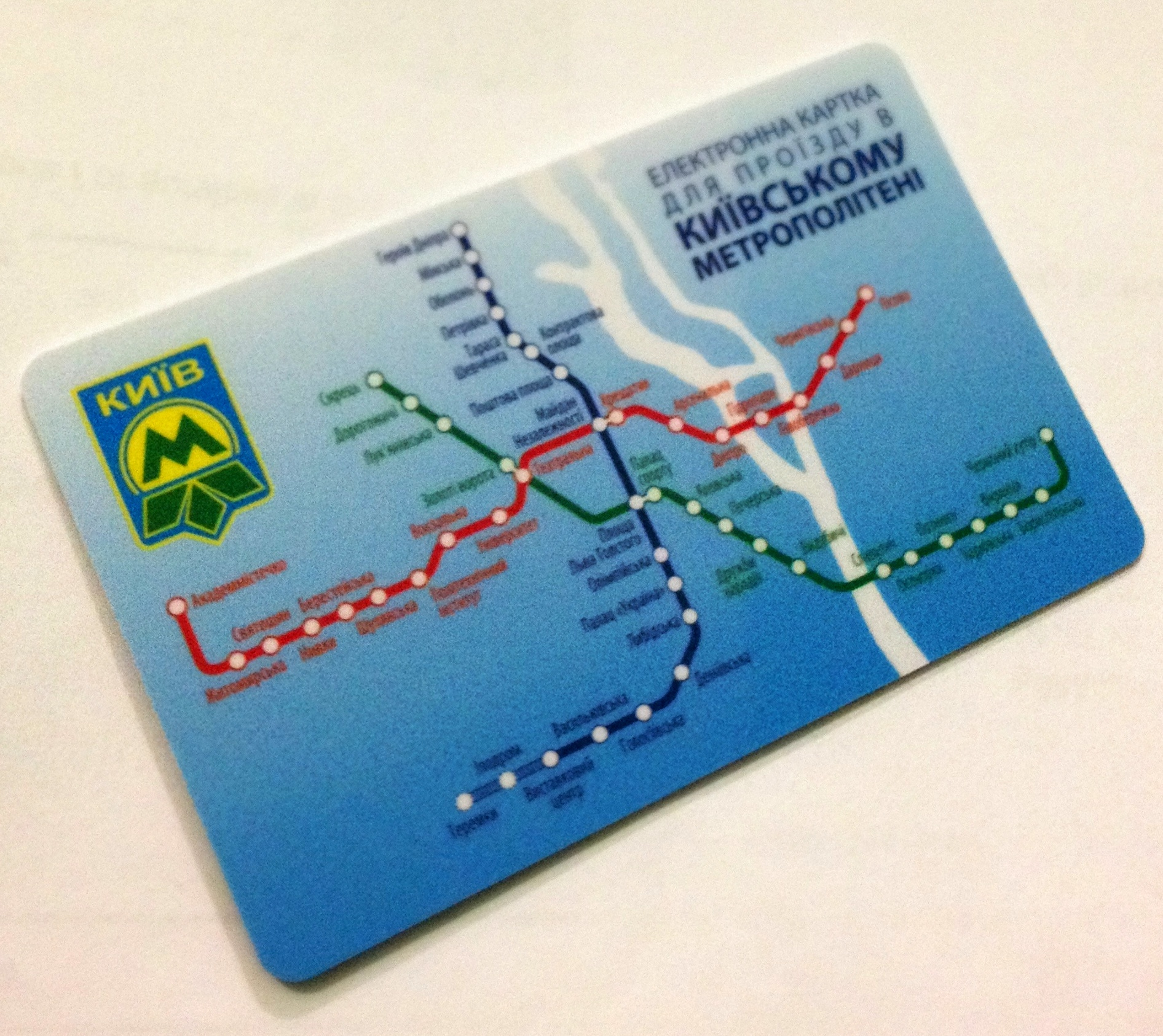
A multi-ride card for the Kyiv Metro showing system map

=== Management ===
The Kyiv Metro is managed by the city-owned municipal company Kyivskyi Metropoliten (formally formerly known as Kyivskyi ordena Trudovoho chernovoho prapora Metropoliten imeni V.I. Lenina) which was transferred in the early 1990s from the Ministry of Transportation. The Metro employs several thousand workers in tunnel, track, station, and rolling stock management. In addition to being state-sponsored for operation, income comes from ticket sales and advertisements in stations (controlled by a daughter company Metroreklama). Metro lines are being constructed by Kyivmetrobud public company which allocates segments of construction to individual brigades that are responsible for tunnel and station construction. Kyivmetrobud is directly funded by the profits of the Kyiv Metro and from the city and state budgets. Most of the state funding comes from Kyiv's municipality, while additional subventions are directly received from the state budget since the fares do not correspond to the optimal price which will give the possibility for the Kyiv underground to develop itself.

In 2016, the Kyiv Metro received ₴76.1 million in net income (about US$2.85 million), compared with its ₴119 million loss a year earlier.

The current director is Viktor Brahinsky.

=== Ticketing ===
A single ride costs ₴8.00 ($0.18) regardless of destination and number of transits within the metro. The ride is paid for by paper QR tickets or contactless cards.

==== Contactless cards ====
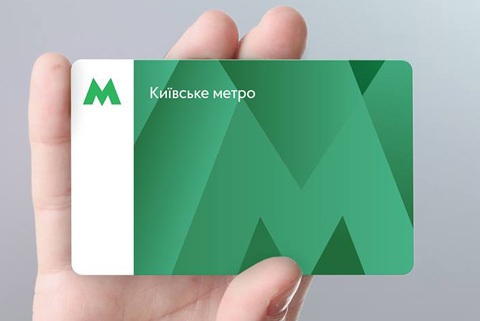
Contactless multi-ride payment card since 2015 (RFID)

Contactless (RFID-based, MIFARE Classic and Ultralight) cards are used to enter the metro. A card can be purchased for a small fee (₴15 ($0.54); refundable should one want to return the card) from cashiers and loaded for up to 50 trips at once (so that not to exceed the 100-ride limit). There is a special gradual scale of prices, such that every tenth purchased access (bought once) makes every previous one cheaper by ₴0.30. To clarify, the first 9 ride accesses cost the standard amount, whereas for 10-19 rides, the price for each one is ₴7.70; for 20-29 rides, ₴7.40; and so on. Thus, loading the card with 50 rides costs only ₴6.50 ($0.23) per ride.

The passenger can also pay for the fare using a bank card. MasterCard PayPass and Visa PayWave cards are accepted. Google Pay and Apple Pay can also be used.

The cards can be recharged either by a cashier or by using a terminal. The terminals accept hryvnia paper bills in denominations of ₴1 to ₴50, but do not return change; instead, they refill the card for the maximum possible number of rides given the sum of money deposited into the machine, and store the remainder in the system, to be used at next refill.

Monthly or two-week passes with unlimited rides (₴380 ($13.46) per month) or a limited number of rides (62 or 46 rides per month, or half of it for 15 days, with the fare of ₴3.87 and ₴4.13 per ride, respectively) can also be purchased. A seven-minute second-use lockout is imposed for all unlimited cards to prevent abuse. Quarterly and yearly tickets were used until December 2009, when they stopped being released because they generated an estimated ₴115.6 million (about $14.5 million) of losses annually.

From the late 1990s until the early 2000s, monthly unlimited metro passes with a magnetic strip were used. Due to reliability and counterfeiting issues, these were phased out in favor of RFID cards.

=== Historical fares ===
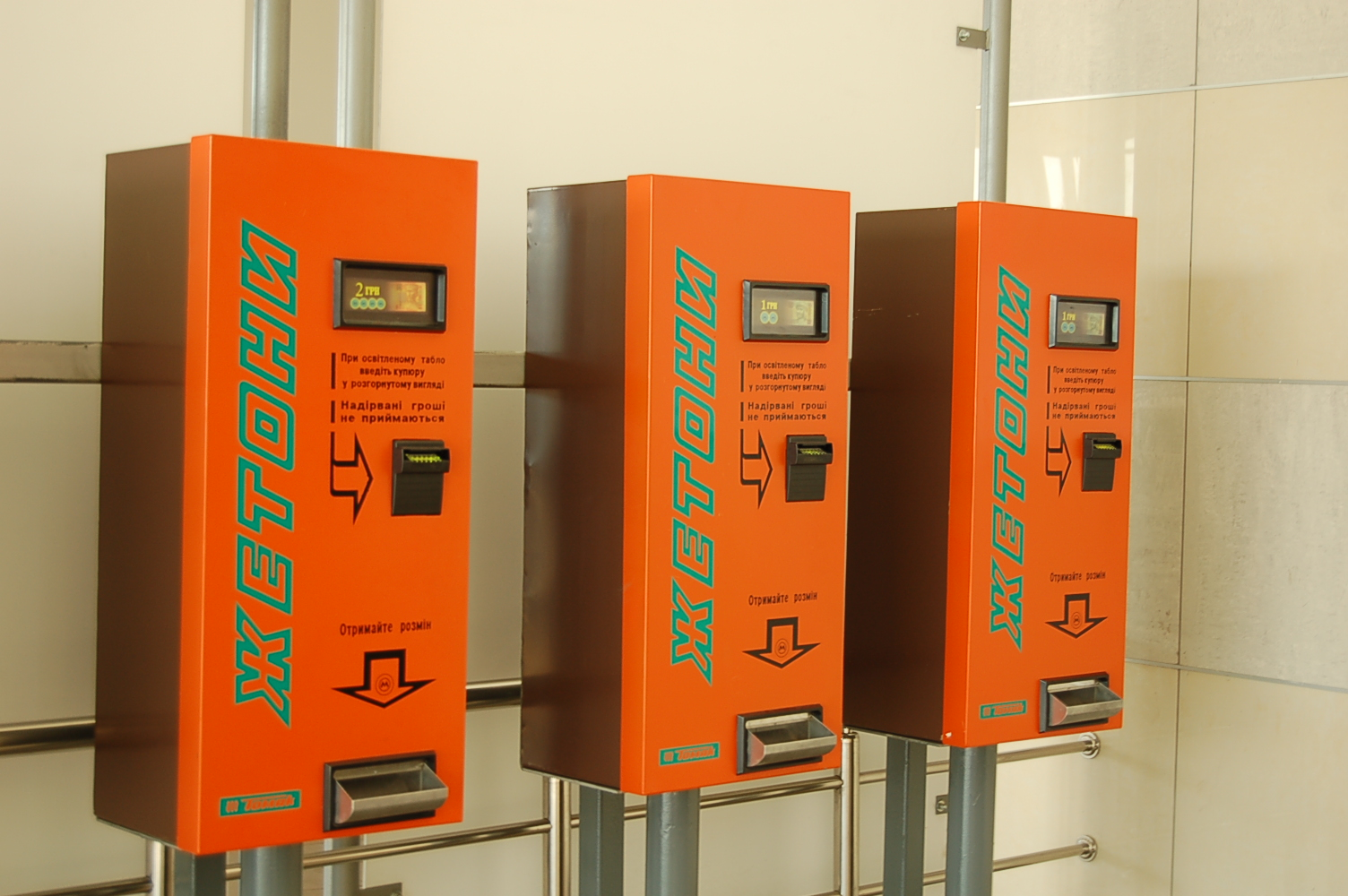
Automatic token selling machines

Originally the Metro ride cost was 50 kopecks; however, in 1961, following a revaluation of the Soviet ruble, the ride was fixed at 5 kopecks for the next 30 years. After 1991, as Ukraine suffered from hyperinflation, the price gradually rose to 20,000 karbovanets in 1996. Following the 1996 denomination, 20,000 karbovanets became ₴0.20 (20 kopiyok), although the karbovanets sum was still payable up to 16 September that year. Since then, the price has risen to ₴0.50 in 2000 and ₴2.00 in 2008. In November 2008, when the price was increased to ₴2.00, public protests took place and the Antitrust Committee of Ukraine ordered to decrease of the price to ₴1.70. In September 2010, the price was increased back to ₴2.00. In February 2015, the price was further increased. The last increase occurred on 15 July 2017.

The fares are set by the Kyiv City State Administration subject to the approval of the Ministry of Infrastructure.

A proposal to set prices according to the distance traveled or time spent in the metro was discussed n 2017. For this purpose, specially built "long" exit turnstiles with card readers at the far end have already been installed at some station exits.

Single journey fare	Equivalent in USD (at the date of introduction, official rate)	Date of introduction
50 kopecks	0.125	12 November 1960
5 kopecks	0.0556	1 January 1961
15 kopecks	0.256	2 April 1991
30 kopecks	0.541	2 January 1992
50 kopiyok	0.005	27 April 1992
5 karbovanets	0.008	26 December 1992
15 karbovanets	0.00454	5 June 1993
30 karbovanets	0.005025	10 September 1993
150 karbovanets	0.00118	6 December 1993
200 karbovanets	0.010	11 August 1994
1,500 karbovanets	0.0191	1 November 1994
7,000 karbovanets	0.0598	1 February 1995

Single journey fare	Equivalent in USD (at the date of introduction, official rate)	Date of introduction
10,000 karbovanets	0.0613	7 September 1995
20,000 karbovanets	0.1065	7 February 1996
20 kopiyok/20,000 karbovanets	0.114	2 September 1996
30 kopiyok	0.159	15 December 1996
50 kopiyok	0.092	19 March 2000
2 hryvni	0.345	4 November 2008
1.70 hryven	0.221	31 January 2009
2 hryvni	0.253	6 September 2010
4 hryvni	0.173	7 February 2015
5 hryven	0.1925	15 July 2017
8 hryven	0.3	14 July 2018
30 hryven	0.022	15 July 2026

==== Tokens ====
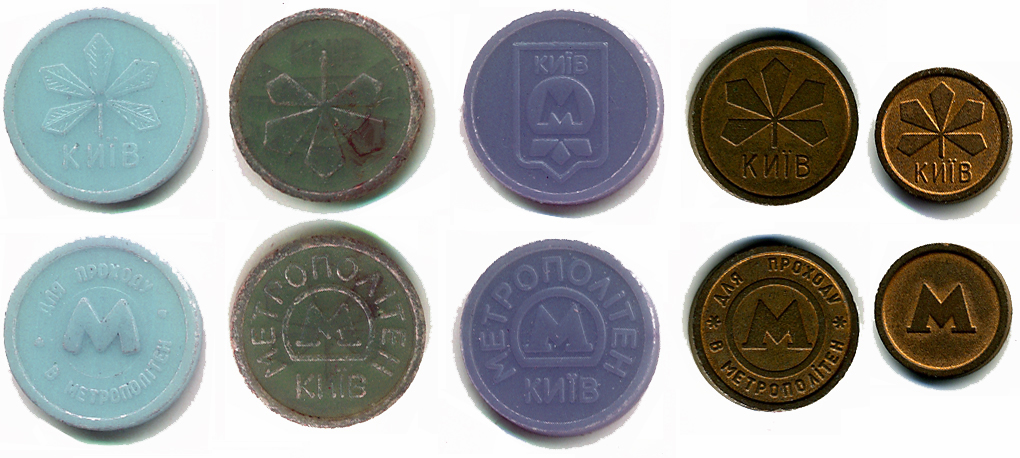
Tokens for single journeys from various eras

For many decades, plastic tokens were used for turnstiles; one token per person could be bought from station cashiers or automatic exchange machines. In recent decades, green tokens were used in 2000-2010 and 2015–2018; blue tokens were used in 2010-2015 and since 2018. Initially, the green (old) tokens were to be substituted by QR-code tickets (introduced in August 2017) and RFID cards.

The use of these tokens was gradually phased out. On 15 July 2019, Nyvky and Ipodrom stations became the first to stop selling and accepting tokens. Tokens were scheduled to be sold until 30 October 2019 and accepted until 3 November 2019; however, tokens were still being sold and used on 15 November 2019. In April 2020, tokens finally went out of circulation.

== Planned improvements and expansion ==
In 2012, plans for the Kyiv Metro aimed to nearly double its length by 2025. Whilst completion of this plan is not considered to be feasible, several new stations have opened since the turn of the millennium.

New stations since 2000
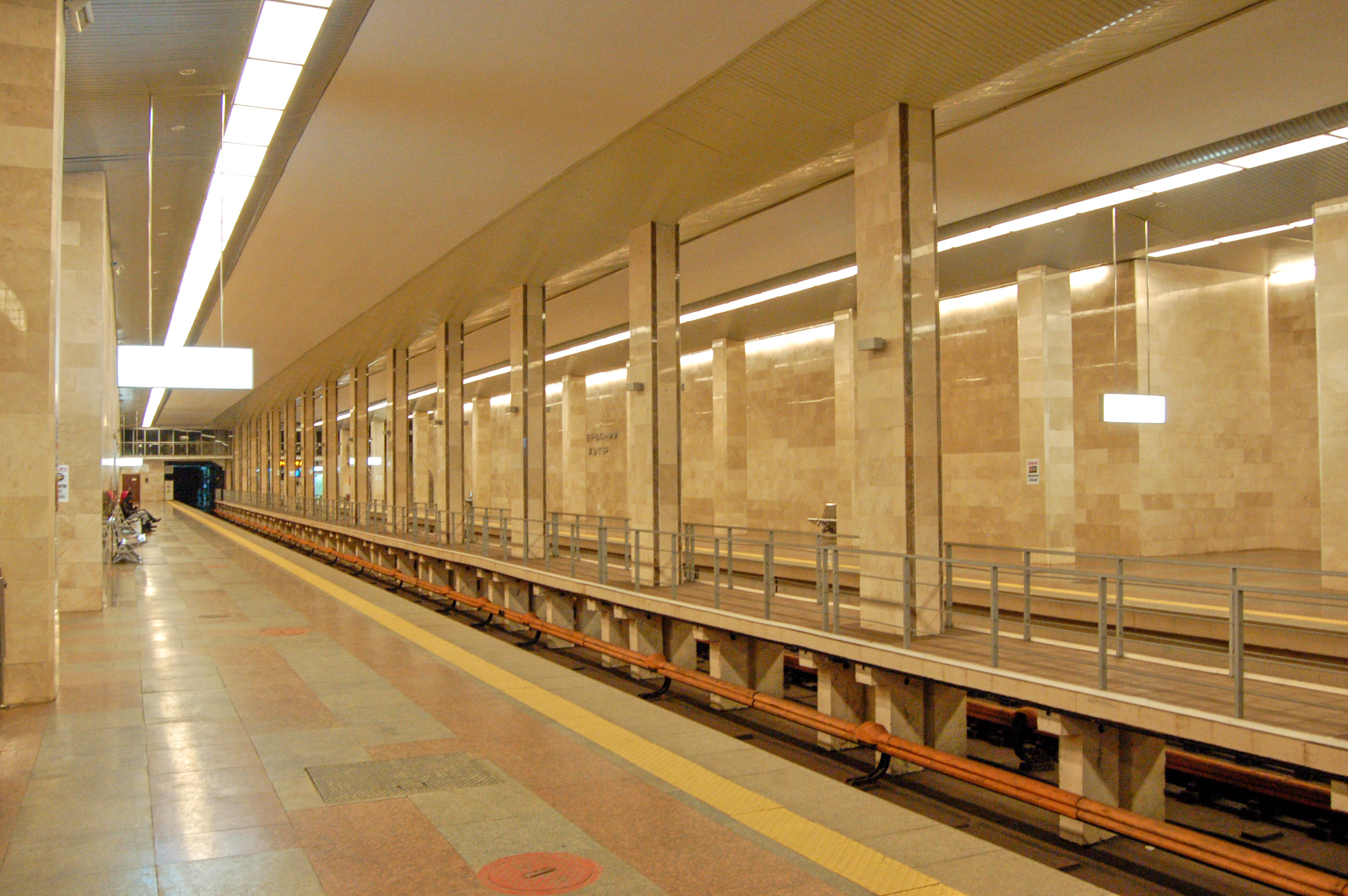
Chervonyi Khutir (2008)

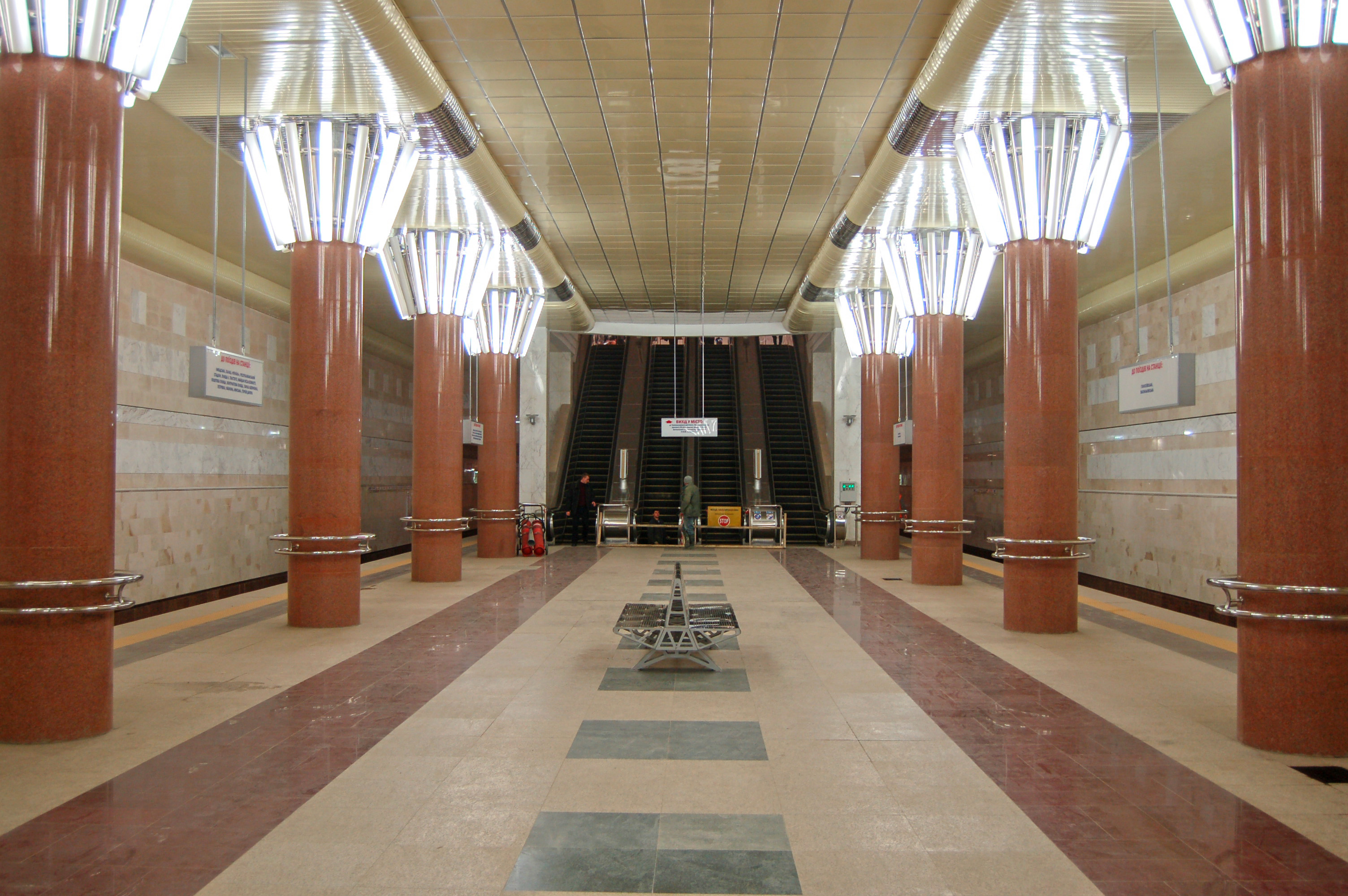
Demiivska (2010)

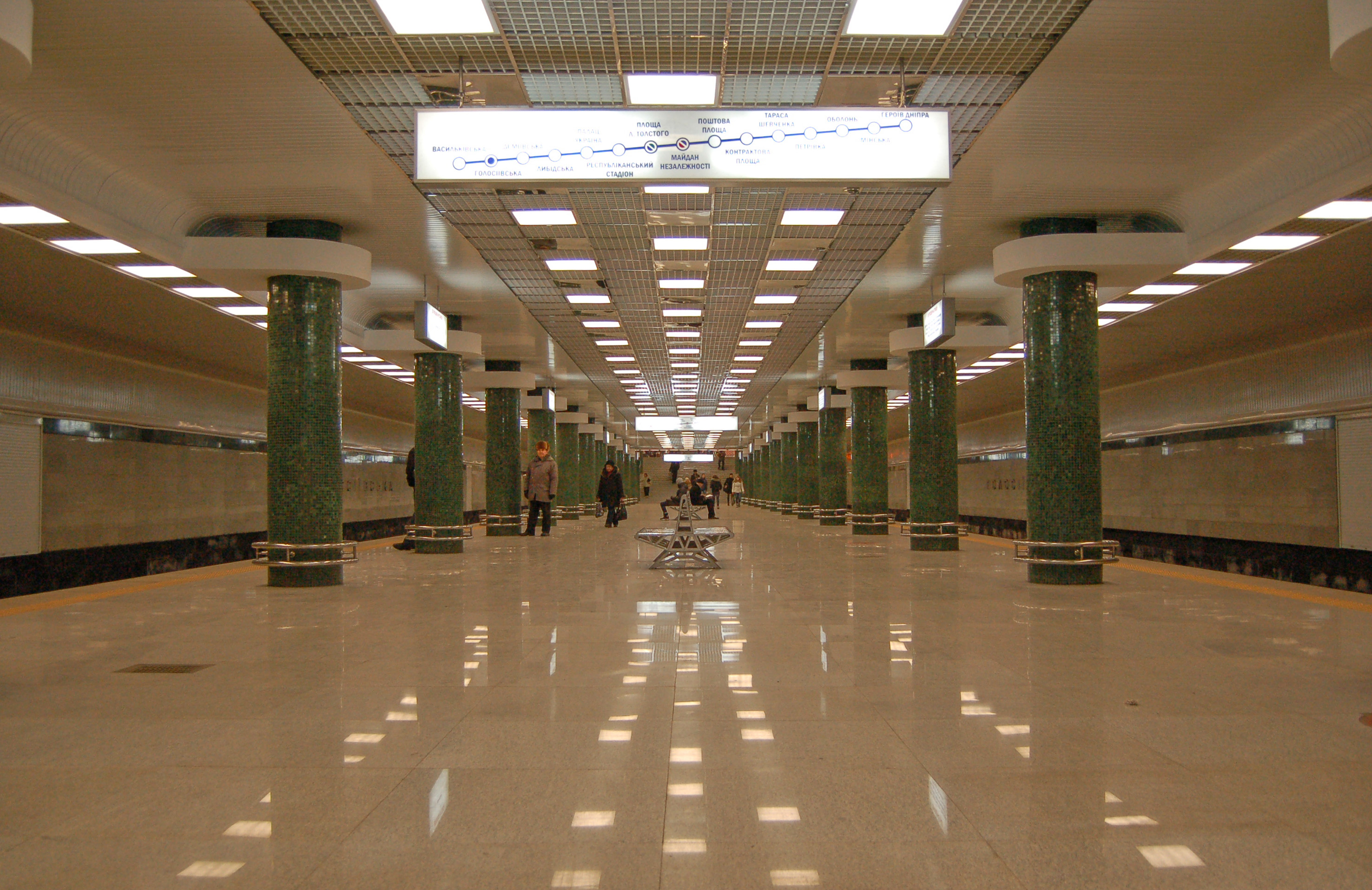
Holosiivska (2010)

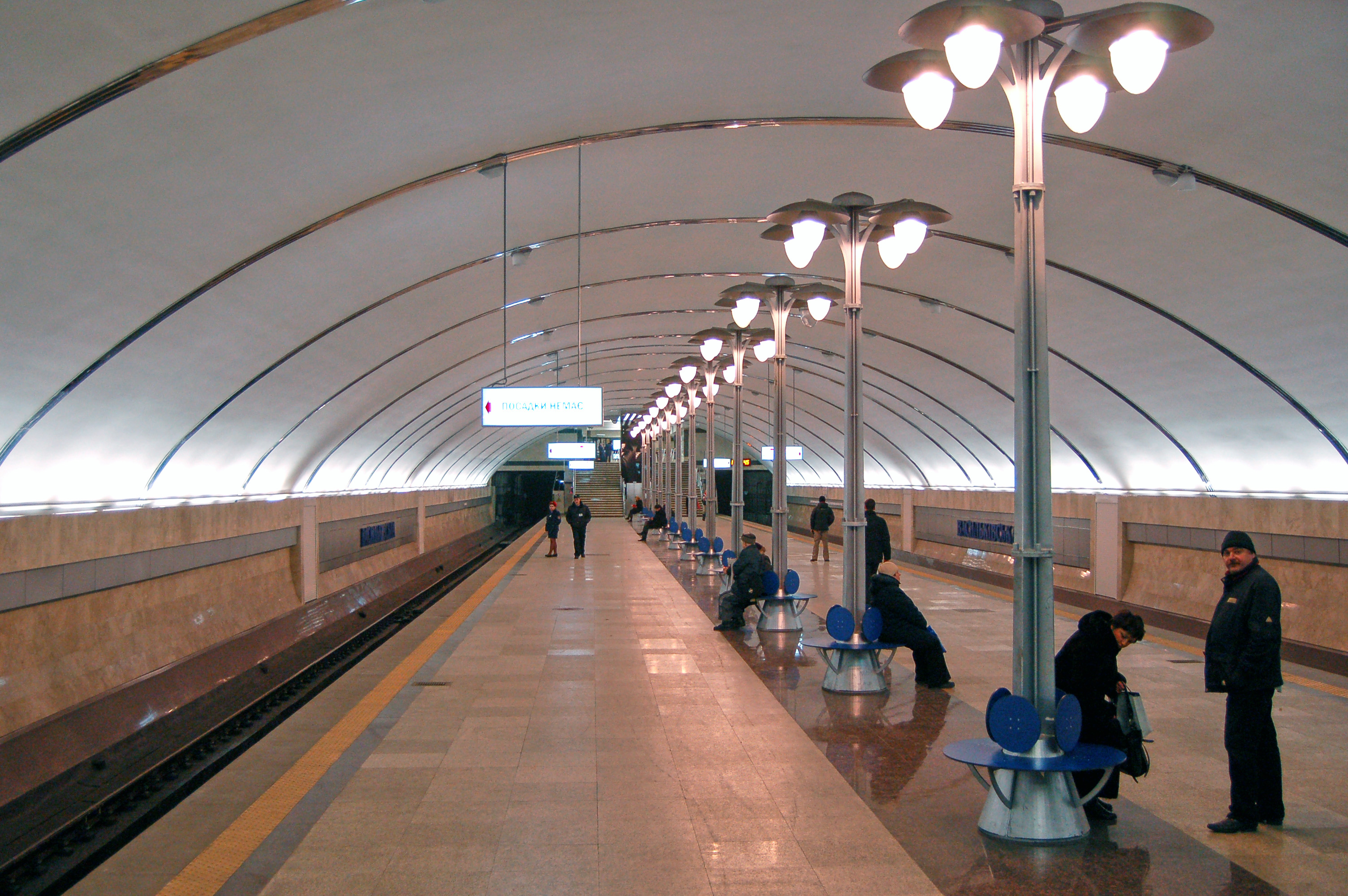
Vasylkivska (2010)

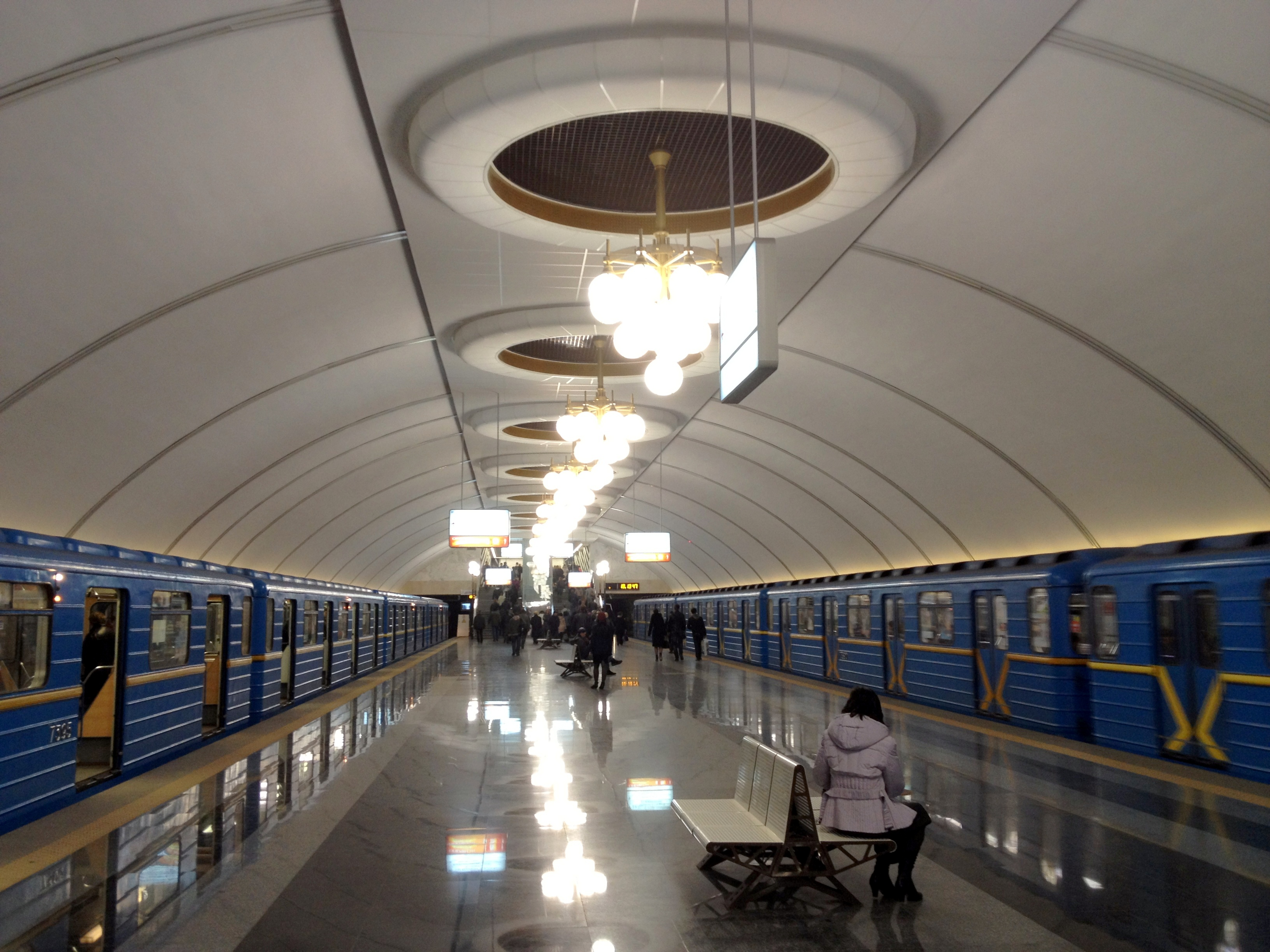
Vystavkovyi Tsentr (2011)

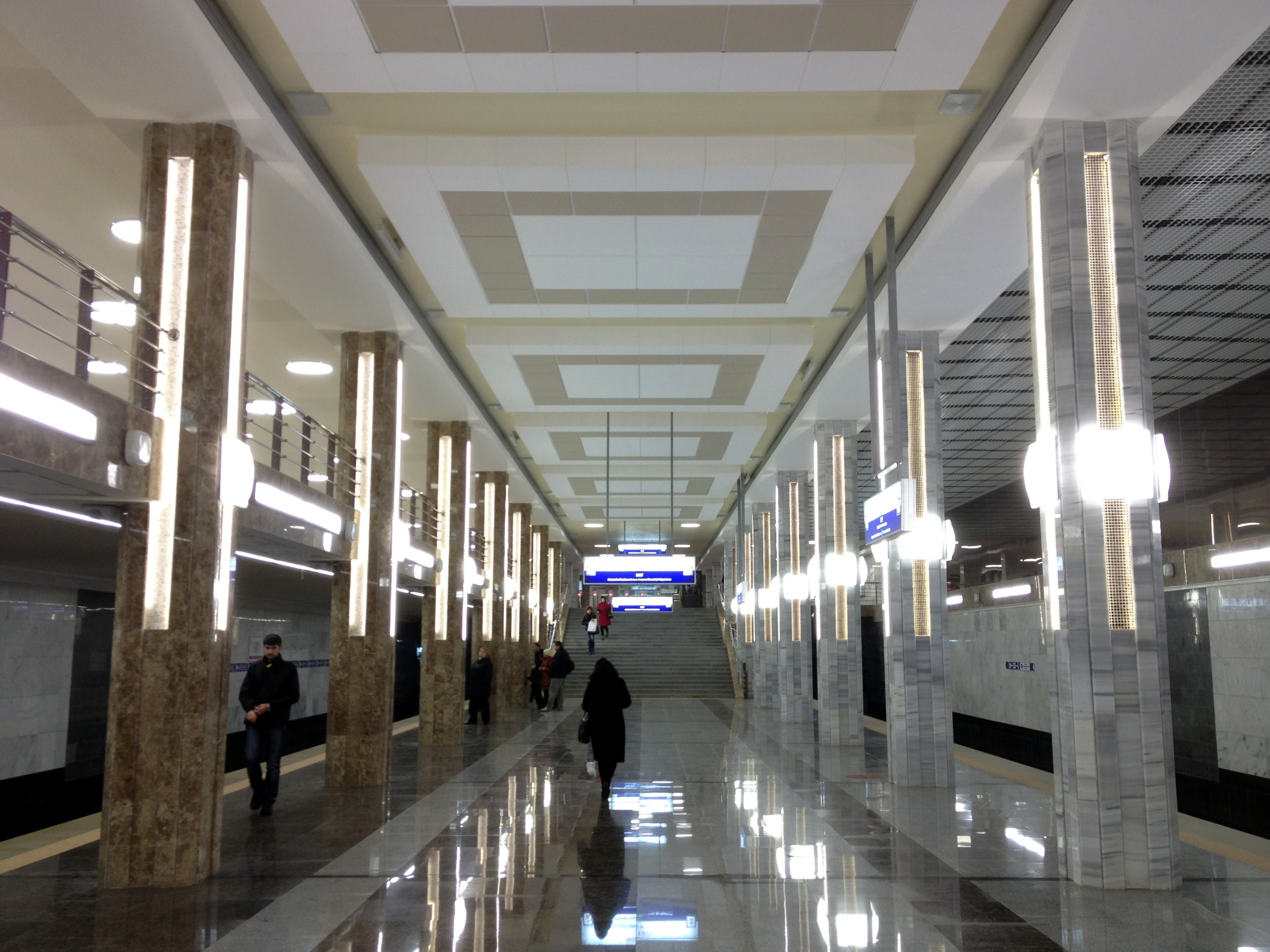
Ipodrom (2012)

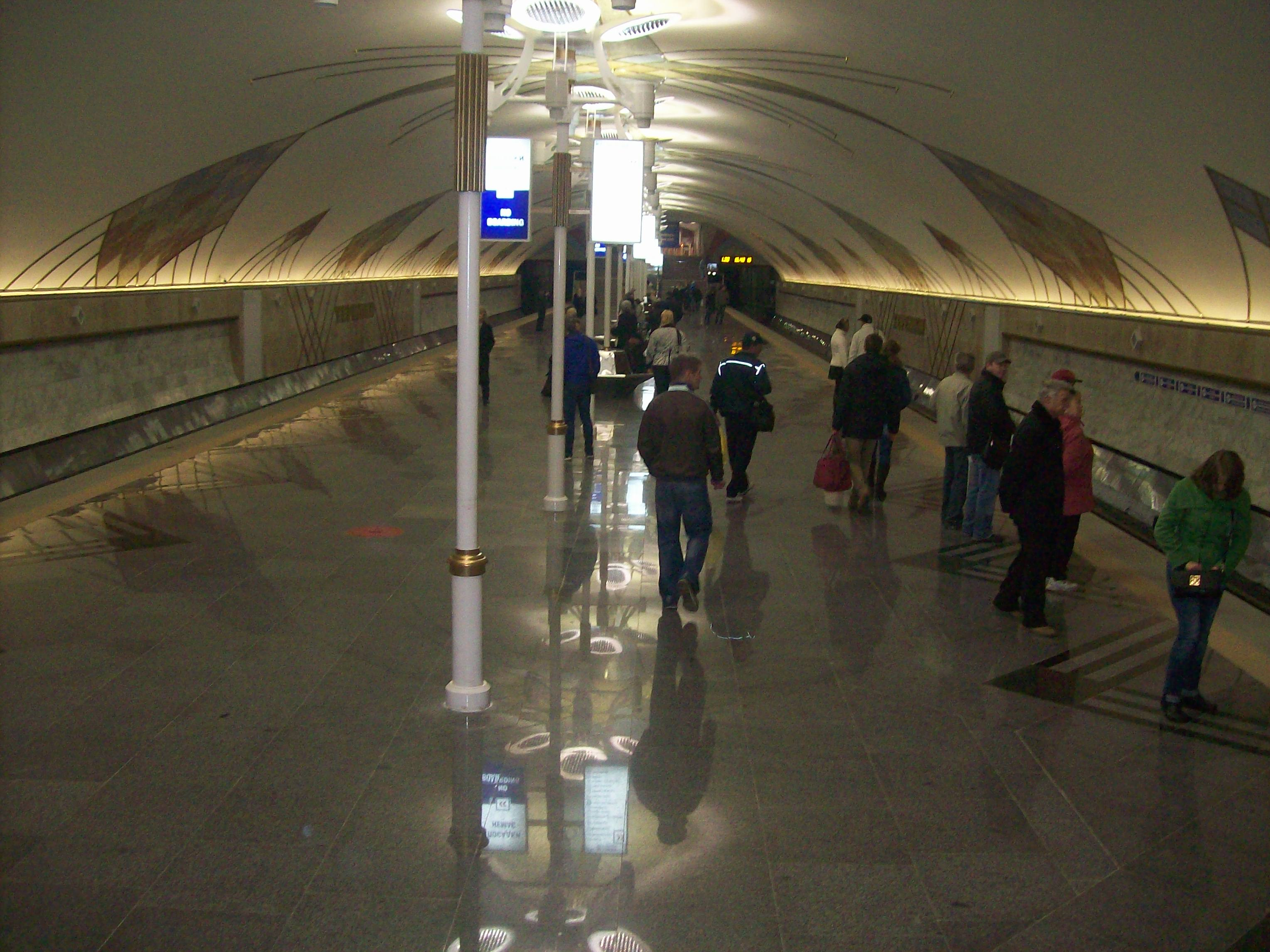
Teremky (2013)

=== Construction of additional lines ===
Map of the planned expansion of the Kyiv Metro (on the basis of the 2005 general plan).

==== Line 4 (Podilsko-Vyhurivska) ====
The fourth line of the Kyiv Metro (also known as the Podilsko-Voskresenska line) will connect the northern Troieshchyna districts in the east with the future business center of Rybalskyi Peninsula on the Dnieper River, and from there arc around the Podil neighborhood. The line will continue westwards along the northern slope of the Starokyivska Hora and into the northwestern part of central Kyiv, where it will turn south and reach the Kyiv-Pasazhyrskyi Railway Station. In doing so, it will offer transfers to all three other Metro lines and thus relieve the over-congested transfer points in the center. The last planned stage will connect the line to Kyiv's Zhuliany airport and the residential districts along the way.

This line first appeared in plans in 1980, when a new plan for Kyiv Metro development appeared. The section between Voskresenka (2 km south of Troieshchyna) and Vokzalna (through Chervona Ploshcha (now Kontraktova Ploshcha station), instead of today's plan to direct it via Tarasa Shevchenka), was planned to be open by 2000. Due to protests over the passage of the line through the historical neighborhood of Podil, the line was rerouted.

Construction started in 1993, from the Podilsko-Voskresenskyi bridge. It was later stopped due to financial difficulties. This remains the only built section of the line. A second attempt was made in 2004, and it was expected that the bridge would be opened three years later, but work was again halted because the bridge had to pass through Rusanivski Sady, where the houses were to be demolished without compensation, which resulted in protest from residents. Other factors that contributed to the suspension of the project included problems with construction and the 2008 financial crisis. Work on the bridge was only restarted in mid-2017, and it was forecasted to be opened by the end of 2021.

The feasibility of the line has been subject to discussion, and alternative projects have been proposed, such as the construction of a light rail or light metro instead. Nevertheless, as of 6 July 2017, the subway option is still preferred, despite the route being altered from plan to plan.

In May 2017, the Kyiv City Council signed a memorandum with a Chinese consortium (which includes the China Railway International Group and the China Pacific Construction Group) to assess the current advancement of the project and, eventually, to finally construct the line. The first segments of the line (colloquially called "metro to Troieshchyna") are planned to be finished by 2025, while further construction will most probably end after 2030.

==== Line 5 (Livoberezhna) ====
This line first appeared as a planned line on maps in 1974.

The northern end of the fifth line of the system exists already as part of the Kyiv tram. However, it will require conversion and, according to some projects, will be temporarily operated as a branch of the Podilsko-Vyhurivska line (4th line). Eventually, a southward extension will commence that will follow along the eastern bank of the Dnieper to the Southern Osokorky district. This is the last Metro project that is envisioned in the present expansion plan and is not expected to be completed until the end of the 2030s.

In 2009, it was planned that the first stage of this line will be launched in 2019. As of 6 July 2021, however, no section of the line has been opened.

==== Line 6 (Vyshhorodsko-Darnytska) ====
This is a proposed line in the Kyiv underground. Currently, it is under planning. The line is expected to be built in the distant future—as of 2012, any construction was predicted to start only after 2025. However, shortly after the announcement of such a proposal, the project has been resigned from.

=== Extensions ===
==== Line 1 extensions ====
One potential long-term extension of the M1 line is to the town of Brovary, to the east of Kyiv. A much more feasible short-term extension is to Novobilychi station, with a depot. In 2011, Volodymyr Fedorenko, then-head of the Kyiv Metro communal enterprise, said this extension might be constructed by 2020. However, this construction has not happened, as the Line 4 construction is currently the absolute priority; moreover, Novobilychi station's location will not bring the line to any significant residential area (Bilychi, the nearest area, is already west of Akademmistechko station), although it will connect with a train station. As of 5 May 2021, no tenders have taken place. The westward extension might continue further into Berkovets.

==== Line 2 (southern extension) ====
A planned extension of the M2 line will feature a side branch: the side branch will go to the Teremky bus station, which opened in December 2016, and Dmytro Lutsenko street, and will serve the Teremky-2 and Teremky-3 residential areas, while the main line is expected to go further southwest to Odeska station. For the moment, this extension is not a priority.

==== Line 3 (eastward extension) ====
Several extension proposals for the M3 line have been made. In the 2005 general plan, the line was supposed to turn sharply from Chevonyi Khutir to Darnytsia railway station, with a subsequent extension to Livoberezhna. Presumably, the proposal was declined, as later plans do not include any lines' prolongation beyond Chervonyi Khutir. In April 2017, Kyiv's Mayor Vitali Klitschko and Ukraine's Minister of Infrastructure, Volodymyr Omelyan, announced they "were talking about the project of subway extension from Boryspilska metro station to Boryspil airport with the help of private financing", although the project's approximately 15 km (9.3 mi) extension is unlikely to happen soon.

==== Line 3 (northward extension) ====
The northward extension to Vynohradar has been a long-planned event, with the first maps appearing in the newspaper Evening Kyiv in August 1970.

In February 2017, an article suggested that the plans were already given for analysis and that construction had to start by late 2017. The article mentions that the project will feature an engineering feat not made before in Kyiv: instead of parallel tunnels, one tunnel will be on top of another. On 6 July 2017, the Chinese Machinery Engineering Corporation said it was ready to invest and build the line to Vynohradar. In February 2017, the line's extension and two stations—Mostytska and Varshavska (earlier known as Prospekt Pravdy)—were scheduled for opening in late 2019. In November 2018, Kyiv Metro signed a contract for the construction of the Mostytska and Varshavska subway stations and a branch line toward the Vynohradar station; the deadline for completion was set for 2021. In the contract, it was agreed that the Chamber of Commerce would judge on possible justifiable force majeure that would slow down the work. In early September 2021, the Chamber of Commerce judged there was such, and the expiration of the contract with the Kyiv Metro was to be postponed from November 2021 to May 2023. The opening of the stations was further delayed to 2024 in July 2023. As of May 2025 the stations are expected to be opened in 2027.

Further plans feature another extension to Marshala Hrechka station with Vynohradar depot built as well.

== Language ==
=== Ukrainian, Russian, and English languages ===
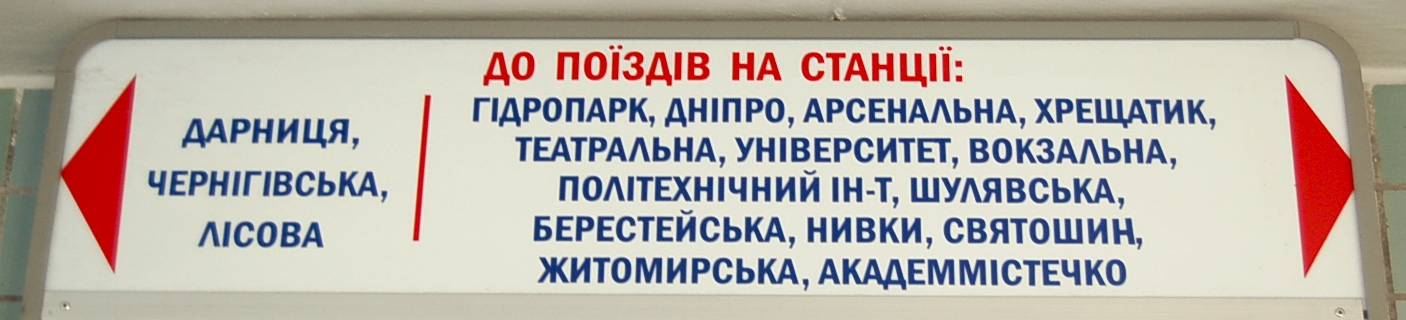
Ukrainian language signs are dominant throughout the Kyiv metro

When the Metro was opened in 1960, although many workers and all technical-level documents used Russian, all the signs and announcements used Ukrainian exclusively. The lexical similarity of the languages allowed every station to have a Russian translation, and these were often given in Russian language literature and media. However, some Ukrainian names for stations were different from Russian ones, and to signify this, those stations were sometimes partially translated into Russian, effectively blending Ukrainian words into Russian grammar. Examples of this include the station names Ploshcha Zhovtnevoi Revolutsii, Zhovtneva, and Chervonoarmiyska (later renamed to Maidan Nezalezhnosti, Beresteiska, and Palats Ukraina, respectively) which when translated into Russian would become Oktyabrskaya and Krasnoarmeiskaya. The names were instead given as Zhovtnevaya and Chervonoarmeiskaya.

In the early to mid-1980s, due in part to both Volodymyr Shcherbytsky's gradual Russification campaign and Kyiv becoming increasingly Russophonic, the metro started to change as well. Although the stations retained their original Ukrainian titles on the vestibules, Russian appeared together with Ukrainian on the walls and replaced Ukrainian in signs and voice announcements. Stations that were opened during this period still had Ukrainian names appearing along with Russian ones on the walls, but now all the decorations where slogans were included, became bilingual. Also during this time, the practice of blending Ukrainian into Russian was dropped, and those selected stations were named in standard Russian translation.

During Perestroika in the late 1980s, bilingualism was gradually introduced in signs and voice announcements on trains. Before 1991, this was done with Ukrainian following Russian, but after the republic proclaimed independence in August 1991, the order was changed to Ukrainian preceding Russian. After the fall of the Soviet Union in late 1991, both signs and voice announcements were changed from bilingual to just Ukrainian as the official language of the state. However, the Russian names are still used in Russian-language literature and some documentation, and some of the decorations still feature bilingual inscriptions.

The usage of English in stations started just before the Euro-2012 football tournament, and all of Kyiv's underground stations now feature English with Latin transliteration on signs and official maps. English is used for the station arrival announcements on par with Ukrainian.

== History of station names ==
Some of Kyiv's underground stations have been renamed before and (to a greater extent) after they were completed. The only station to be renamed during the Soviet period occurred in 1977 when the name of "Ploshcha Kalinina" was changed to "Ploshcha Zhovtnevoi Revolutsii" for the upcoming 60th anniversary of the October Revolution.

During the 1990s, more changes occurred, mostly relating to stations with names connected to Communism. On 15 October 1990, "Chervona Ploshcha" became "Kontraktova Ploshcha", and "Prospekt Korniychuka" became "Obolon". A half-built station, due to be called "Artema", was renamed "Lukianivska". On 26 August 1991, following Ukraine's declaration of independence, "Ploshcha Zhovtnevoi Revolutsii" became known as "Maidan Nezalezhnosti". In 1993, nine stations, most of which bore communist symbolism in their name, were given politically neutral names: (Note: Data from "Decision of the Kyiv Council of People's Deputees of the Kyiv City Governmental Administration nr. 16/116 On the return of historical names [and] renaming of parks of culture and leisure [and] metro stations (2 February 1993))

Former name	New name
Zhovtneva (October)	Beresteiska (Brest)
Dzerzhynska (Dzerzhinsky)	Lybidska (Lybid)
Chervonoarmiiska (Red Army)	Palats Ukraina (Palace "Ukraine")
Mechnykova (Mechnikov)	Klovska (Klov)
Pionerska (Pioneer)	Lisova (Forest)
Bilshovyk (Bolshevik)	Shuliavska (Shuliavka)
Leninska (Lenin)	Teatralna (Theater)
Komsomolska (Komsomol)	Chernihivska (Chernihiv)

In 2011, "Respublikanskyi Stadion" became "Olimpiiska", in honour of the forthcoming Euro-2012 football tournament. In 2018, "Petrivka" (named after the Soviet politician Grigory Petrovsky) was re-designated as "Pochaina" after the river that once flowed nearby, to comply with 2015 decommunization laws.

In 2023, as part of derussification efforts following Russia's invasion of Ukraine, the following stations were renamed:

Former name	New name
Ploshcha Lva Tolstoho (Leo Tolstoy Square)	Ploshcha Ukrainskykh Heroiv (Square of Ukrainian Heroes)
Druzhby Narodiv (Friendship of Nations)	Zvirynetska (Zvirynets)
Prospekt Pravdy (Pravda Avenue)	Varshavska (Warsaw)

== See also ==
- List of metro systems
- List of metro systems in the Soviet Union
- Transport in Kyiv
- Kharkiv Metro
- Dnipro Metro
- Kryvyi Rih Metrotram
