= Povitrianykh Syl Prospect =

Street in Kyiv, Ukraine

Coordinates: 50°26′46″N 30°28′53″E

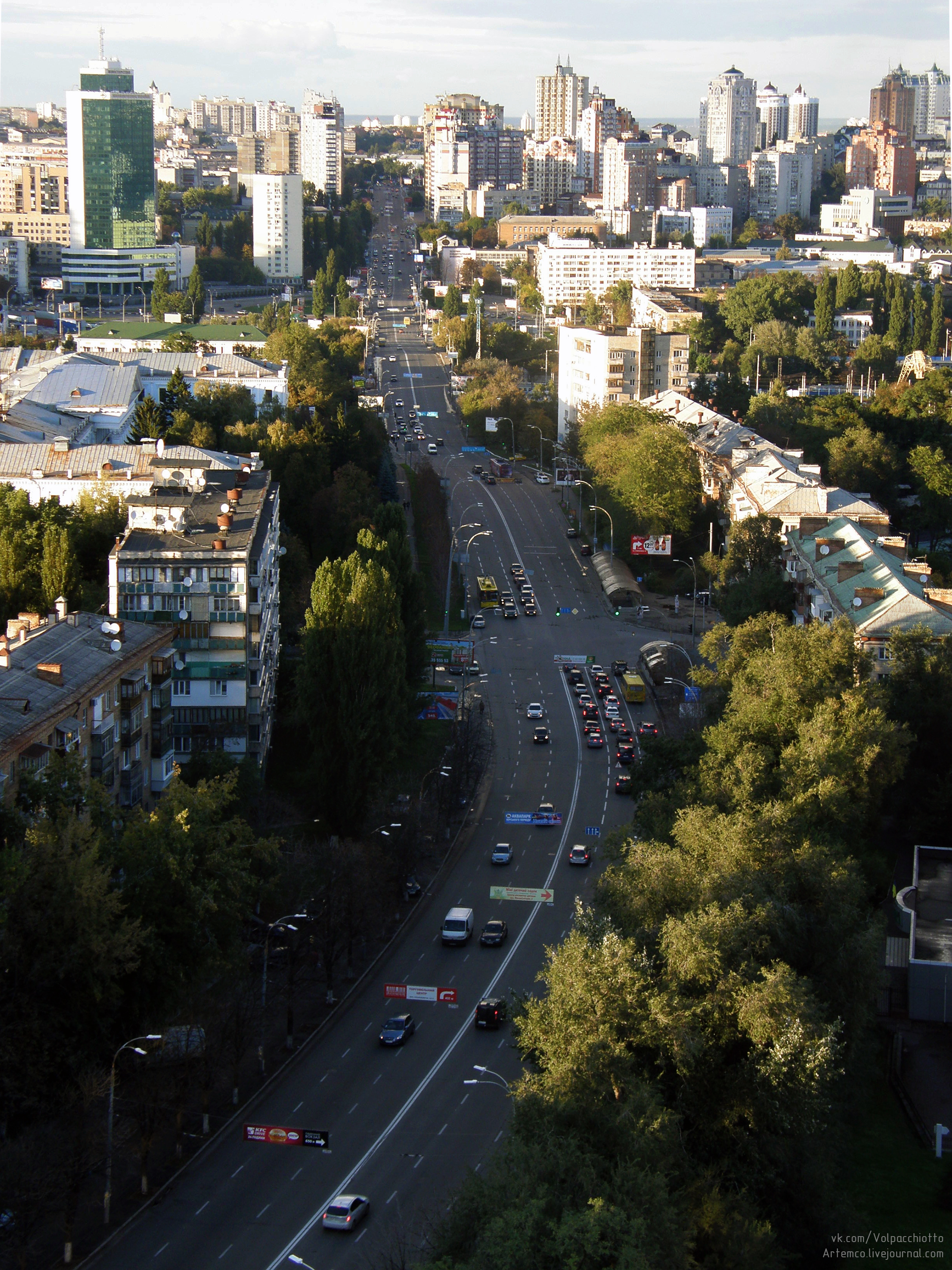
- View of Povitrianykh Syl Avenue
- Native name: Проспект Повітряних Сил (Ukrainian)
- Length: 6.3 km (3.9 mi)
- Location: Kyiv, Ukraine; Shevchenkivskyi and Solomianskyi districts

The Povitrianykh Syl Prospect (Ukrainian: Проспект Повітряних Сил) is a broad street (prospekt) located in Shevchenkivskyi District and Solomianskyi District of Kyiv. It runs from Viacheslava Chornovola Street to Kyiv International Airport.

== History ==
Povitryanykh Syl Avenue appeared in the middle of the 19th century as a road to Zhuliany. Since 1848, the Cadet Highway, from which the building of the Kyiv Cadet Corps (1848-1857) is located at the beginning of the highway and now houses the Ministry of Defense. Then the highway started from Lvivska Street (now Sichovykh Striltsiv Street) and reached the current Ivana Ohiienka Street.

== See also ==
- Brovarskyi prospect
- Prospect Beresteiskyi
