= Nyvky (Kyiv Metro) =

Kyiv Metro Station

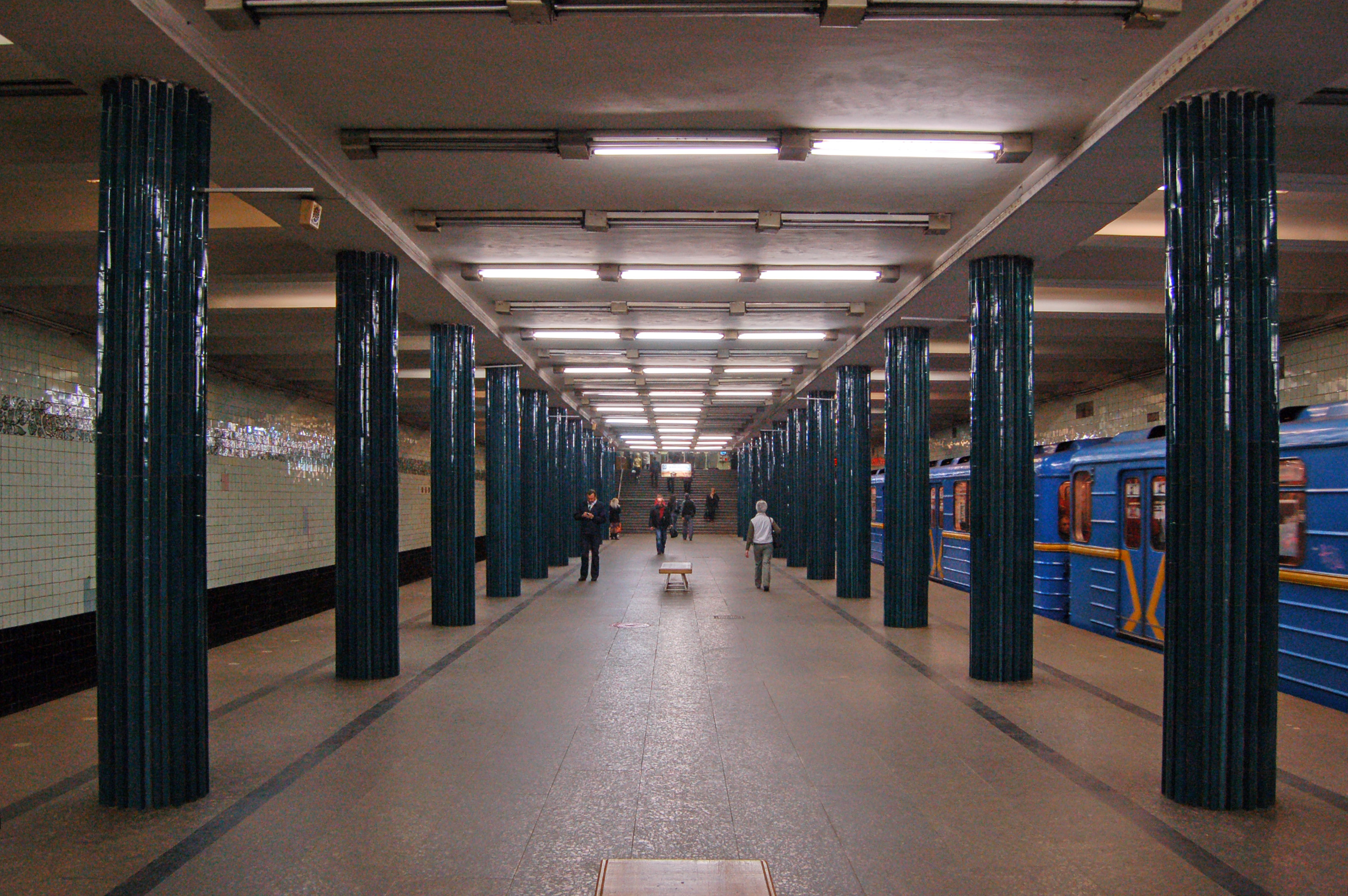
- The Station Hall

General information
- Location: Shevchenkivskyi District; Kyiv; Ukraine
- Coordinates: 50°27′33″N 30°24′23″E
- System: Kyiv Metro station
- Owner: Kyiv Metro
- Line: Sviatoshynsko–Brovarska line
- Platforms: 1
- Tracks: 2

Construction
- Structure type: underground
- Depth: 12.5 m (41 ft)
- Platform levels: 1

Other information
- Station code: 113

History
- Opened: 5 November 1971

Services
Preceding station	Kyiv Metro	Following station
Sviatoshyn towards Akademmistechko	Sviatoshynsko–Brovarska line	Beresteiska towards Lisova
Location

Nyvky (Ukrainian: Нивки,) is a station on Kyiv Metro's Sviatoshynsko-Brovarska Line in the Ukrainian capital Kyiv. The station was opened on 5 November 1971, and is named after Kyiv's Nyvky neighbourhood. It was designed by Boris Pryimak, I.L. Maslenkov, V.C. Bohdanovskyi, and T.A. Tselikovska.

The station is shallow underground, along with the Beresteiska and the Sviatoshyn stations, which are the first stations of the Kyiv Metro system that are not lain deep underground. The station consists of a central hall with rows of circular columns near the platforms. The columns are covered with glazed blue-coloured tiles. On the tiled walls along the tracks is a strip of plant motifs. The entrance to the station is located on the corner of the Prospect Beresteiskyi (Brest Avenue) and the Danylo Shcherbakivskyi Street.
