= Brovarskyi prospect =

Avenue in Kyiv, Ukraine

Brovarskyi Prospect
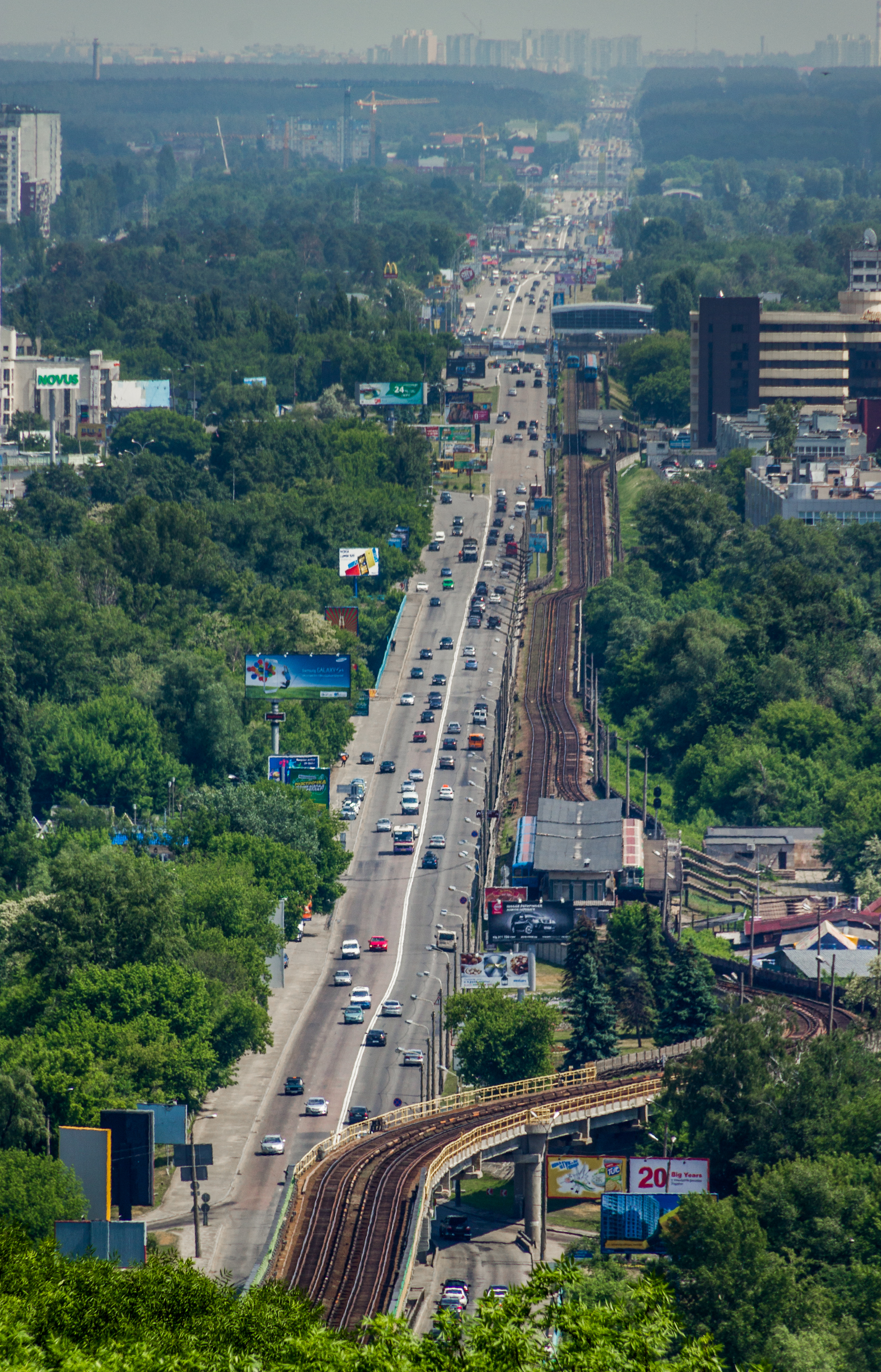
- Native name: Броварський проспект (Ukrainian)
- Former name: 60th anniversary of the October
- Namesake: Brovary (eastern direction)
- Length: 13.2 km (8.2 mi)
- Width: 4 lanes each way
- Area: Peredmostova slobidka, Mykilska slobidka, Sotsmisto, Lisovyi masyv, Bykivnia
- Location: Kyiv, Ukraine
- Postal code: 02002, 02089, 02094, 02206
- Coordinates: 50°26′39″N 30°34′13″E
- West end: Metro Bridge
- East end: Brovary

Construction
- Commissioned: 1973

Brovarskyi Prospect (Ukrainian: Броварський проспект) is an arterial and the longest public roadway in Kyiv, Ukraine. It stretches from the Kyiv Metro Bridge over Dnieper to the city of Brovary.

The roadway was created in the second half of the 20th century (1973), previously known as Brovarske highway (chaussee).

Most of the roadway is part of the M 01 main route (except for the segment between Metro Bridge and vulytsia Bratyslavska). Along the prospect are located several overpasses and bridges. There are also five metro stations of the Sviatoshynsko–Brovarska line as well as couple of railway stations.

From the Metro Bridge it passes Livoberezhnyi Masyv, continues between Lisovyi Masyv on north side and Kyiv Sotsmisto with Kyiv Radykal Factory on south side before it dives into Bykivnia Forest that separates Brovary from Kyiv. Within the Bykivnia Forest, prospect passes an oscillated residential community Bykivnia, better known for its Bykivnia Graves memorial park, and a bird farm "Kyivska".

Before the 20th century it existed as the road that stretched east of the Nicholas Chain Bridge passing through Mykilska Slobidka (Nicholas Village) continuing through big Bykivnia Forest towards Brovary. On the maps of the 19th century Bykivnia Forest occupied bigger territories than today's "Lisovyi Masyv" and "Sotsmisto".

== See also ==
- Prospect Beresteiskyi
- Povitrianykh Syl Prospect
