= Ministry of Defence building =

Ministry of Defence building may refer to:

- Main Building of the Ministry of Defense (Russia)
- Ministry of Defence building (Ukraine)
- Ministry of Defence building (Yugoslavia)
- Ministry of Defence headquarters (Thailand)
- Ministry of Defence Main Building (United Kingdom)
