= Bykivnia Forest =

Urban forest in Ukraine

Coordinates: 50.4738°N 30.7198°E

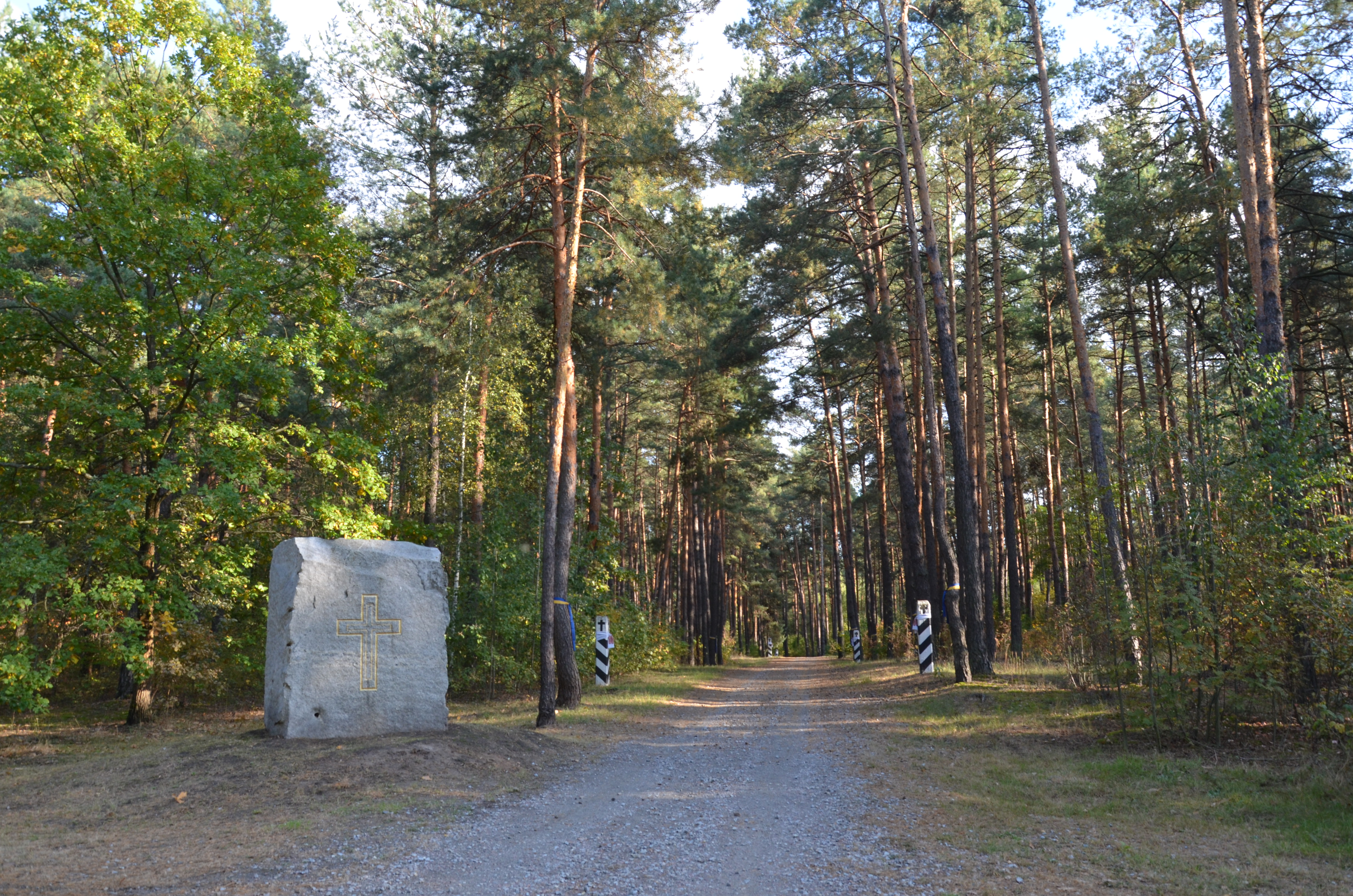
Pine trees of the forest near the memorial park

Bykivnia Forest (Ukrainian: Биківнянський ліс, romanized: Bykivnianskyi lis) is an urban forest consisting mostly of pine trees (90%), and stretching on the eastern side of Kyiv from the National Park Zalissia in southern direction towards Bortnychi, creating a green belt. It is primarily associated with the Memorial Park Bykivnia Graves, which is located within it.

On 19th century maps, the western outskirts of Bykivnia Forest show that it once reached the Dnieper. It has since then lost almost half of its original area, as such as Lisovyi Masyv residential neighbourhoods were built in Kyiv during the 1970s. The forest has an area of 2,582 ha (6,380 acres).

The forest contains a number of lakes and ponds, such as Lake Almazne, Lake Berizka, and ponds that once formed part of the fishery of a Soviet farm, a flooded sand quarry. Through the forest flow rivers Darnytsia and Prirva. A portion of the woodland also contains some peat fields. Within the forest, there is a bird farm. On the edge of the forest are located one of the Kyiv's combined heat and power station and Darnytsia Industrial Park that includes an abandoned chemical factory, railcar repair factory, and an armoured tank factory.
