= Kyiv Metro Bridge =

Bridge in Ukraine

Metro Bridge Міст Метро
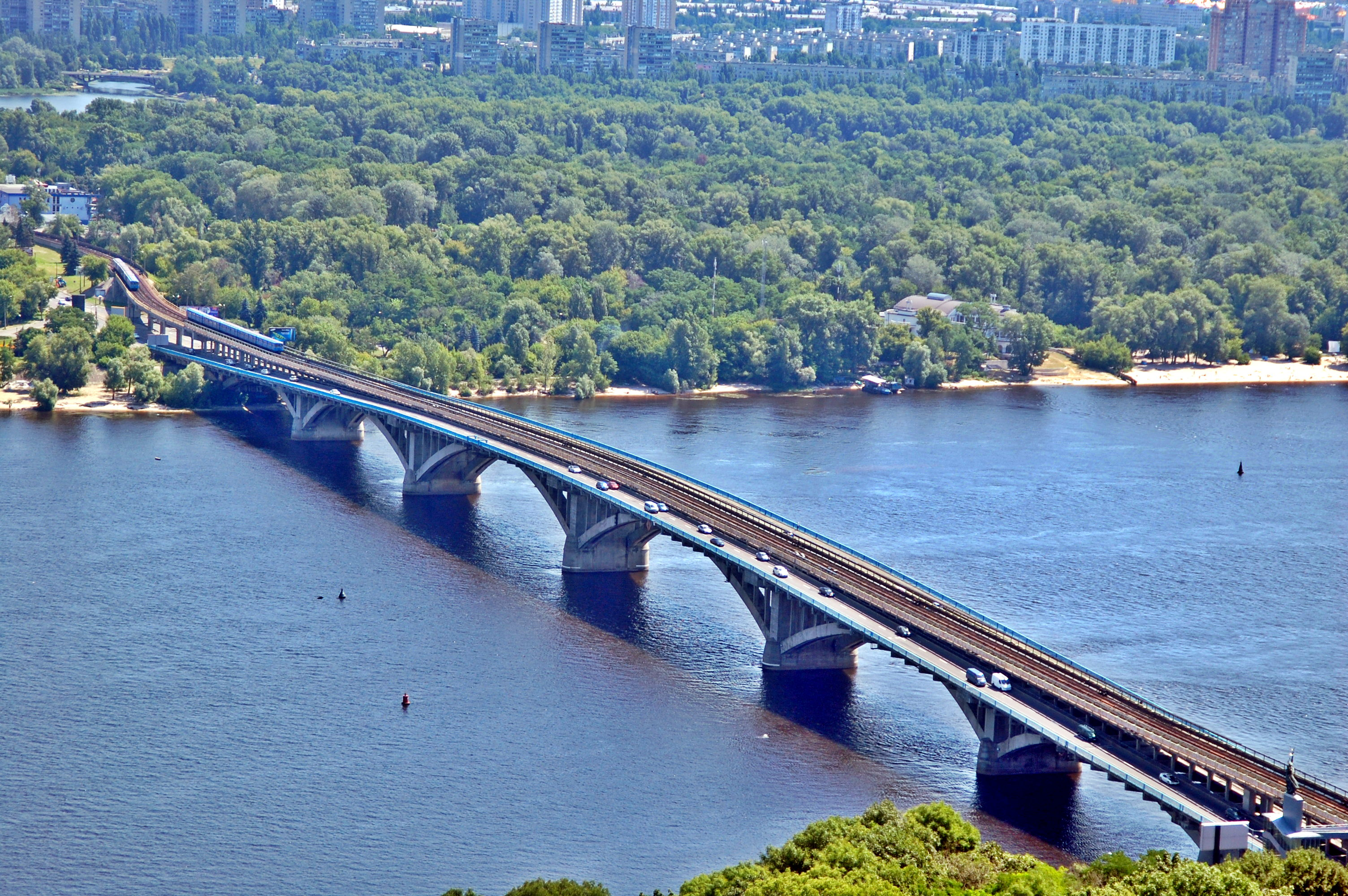
- Metro Bridge
- Coordinates: 50°26′34″N 30°33′54″E
- Carries: Automobiles; Metro
- Crosses: Dnieper River
- Locale: Kyiv, Ukraine
- Official name: Metro Bridge
- Owner: Ukraine
- Preceded by: Parkovyi Pedestrian Bridge
- Followed by: Paton Bridge

Characteristics
- Total length: 700 metres (2,300 ft)

History
- Designer: Heorhiy Fuks
- Engineering design by: Y. Inosov
- Opened: 5 November 1965; 60 years ago

Statistics

Immovable Monument of Local Significance of Ukraine
- Official name: Міст Метро (Metro Bridge)
- Type: Architecture, Urban Planning, Science and Technology
- Reference no.: 529/1-Кв

Location
- Interactive map of Metro Bridge

The Metro Bridge (Ukrainian: Міст Метро, romanized: Mist Metro, IPA: [ˈmist meˈtrɔ]) is the first metro bridge, part of the Brovarskyi prospect spanning across the Dnieper River in Kyiv, the capital of Ukraine. It was engineered by G. Fuks and Y. Inosov and constructed in 1965 with the expansion of the Kyiv Metro system. The bridge is used for both the Sviatoshynsko-Brovarska Line of the metro and for automobile traffic.

== Overview ==
The bridge is 683 m long, 28.9 m wide and 20 m above the river.

It consists of two spans as it links the Venetsiiskyi Island as well as the left and right banks. The larger span consists of an elevated central Metro deck and side automobile decks on separate, lower spans. Both the Metro and automobile paths have a distinct arched contour. This was because the Metro line continues into the hill of the right bank with the Dnipro station.

The smaller span is called Rusanivskyi Bridge, which links the Venetsiiskyi Island with the left bank. It is a conventional, level span, with two northern traffic lanes and a southern Metro path.

== Accidents ==
A terrorist occupation of the bridge occurred on 18 September 2019. A veteran of the Russian-Ukrainian War threatened to blow up the bridge. Traffic was stopped across the bridge for a few hours, causing extensive traffic issues throughout the city, before the man was arrested. He was found not to be in possession of any explosive, just a rifle, with which he shot a police drone.

== Photos ==
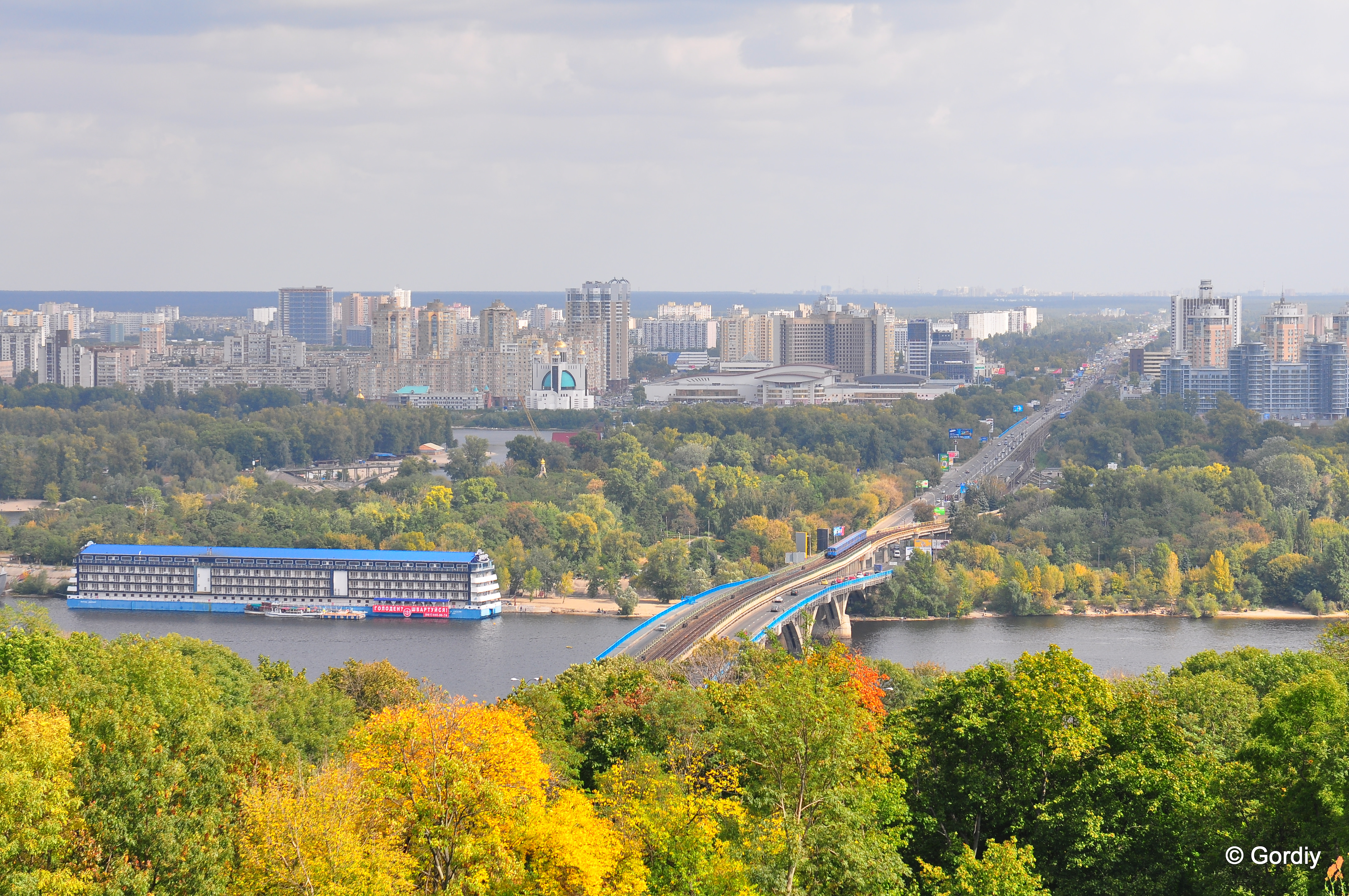

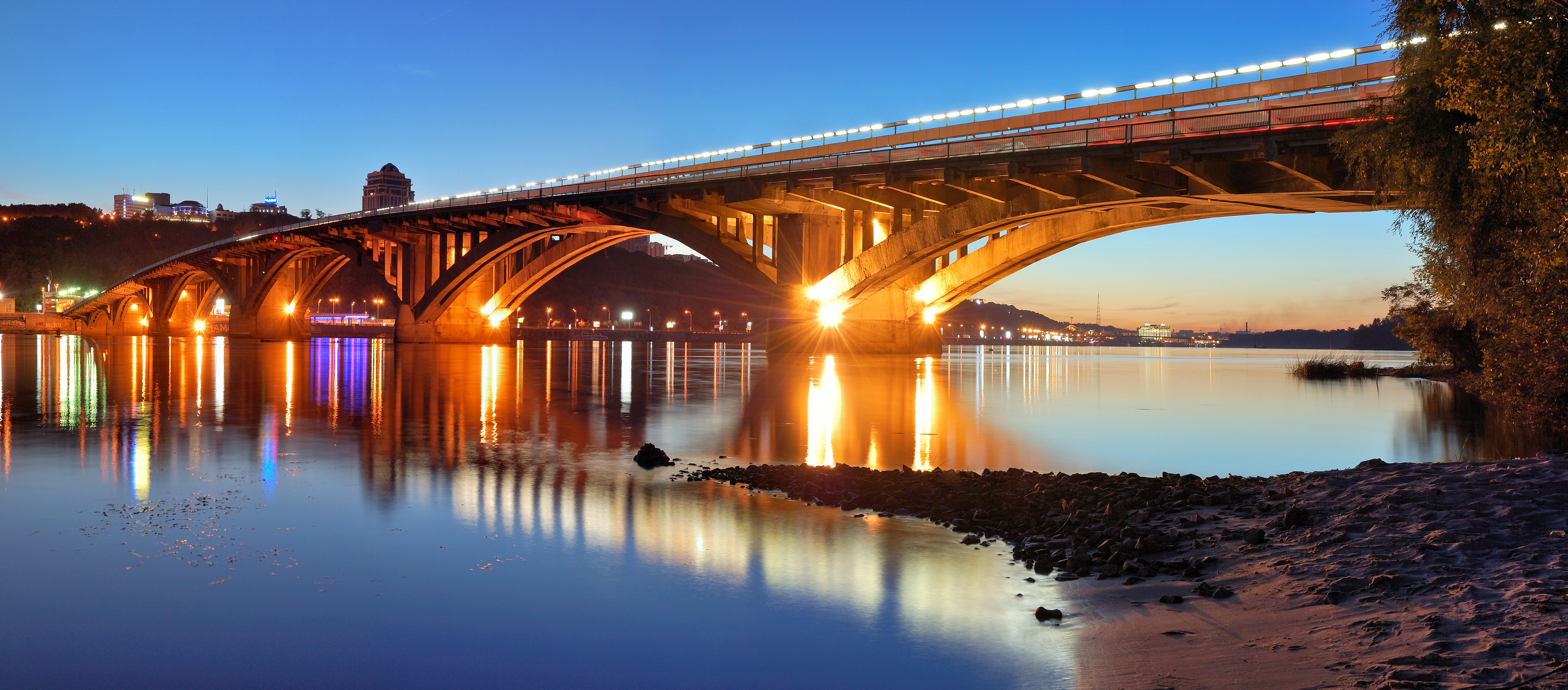

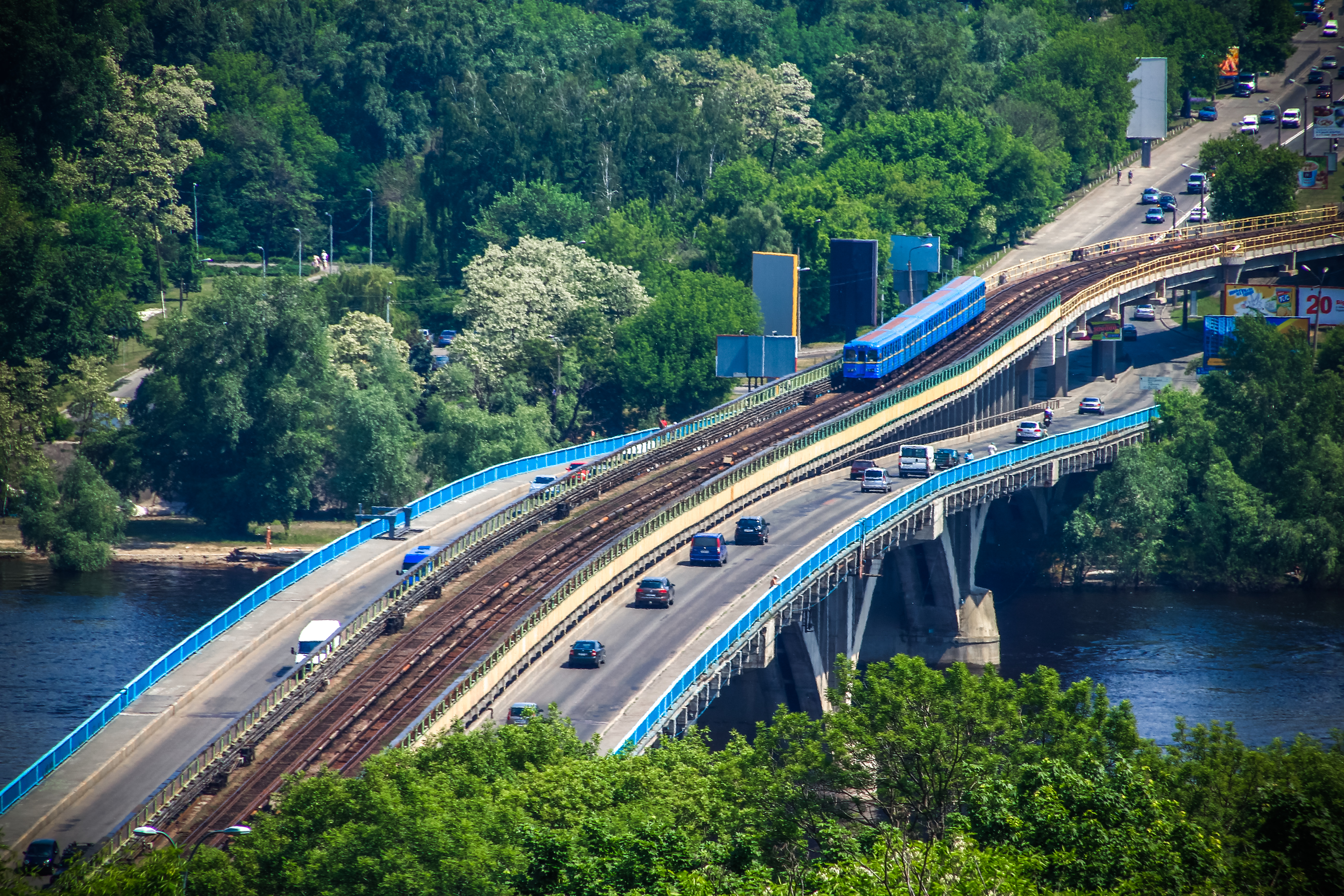

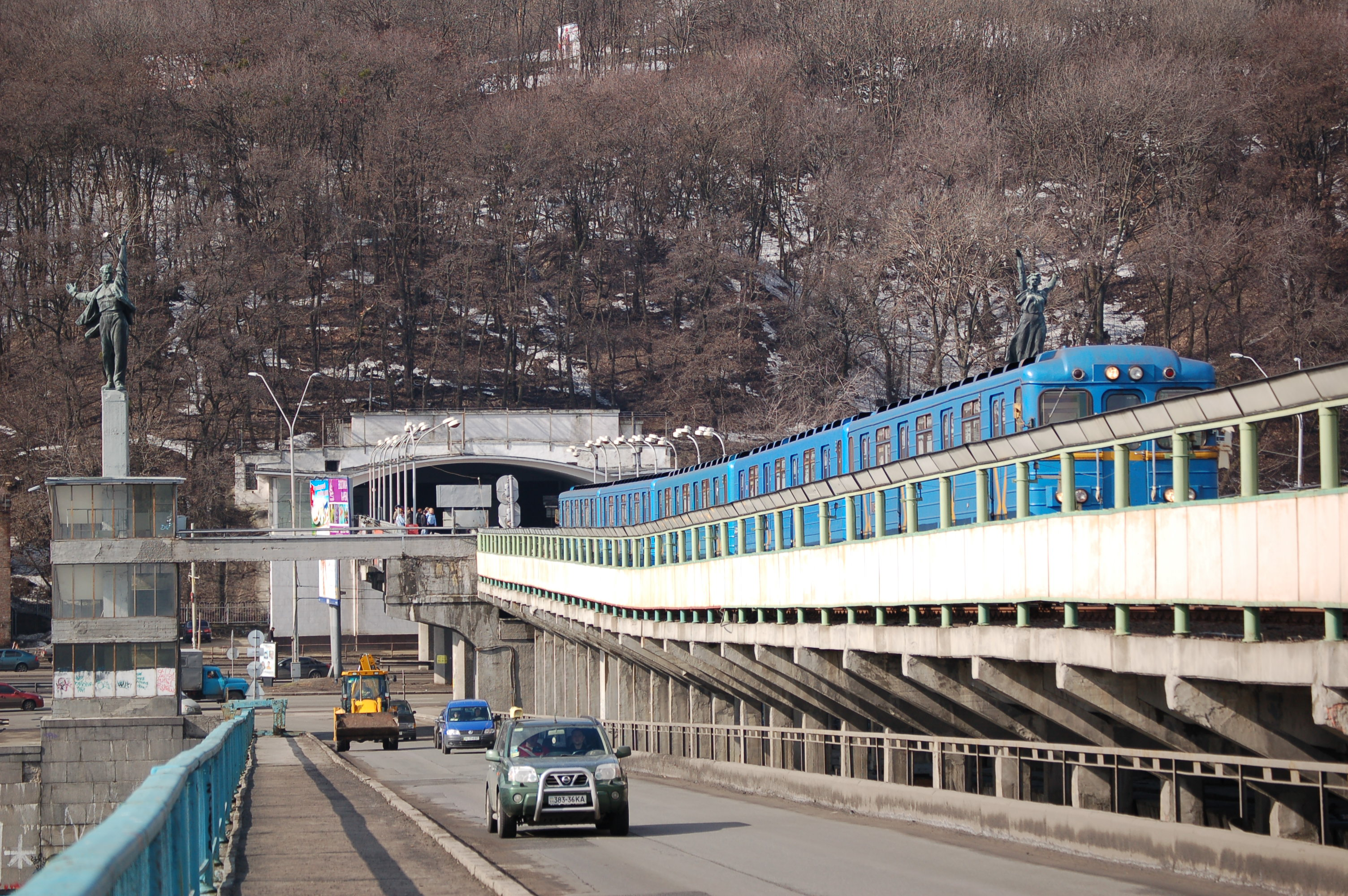

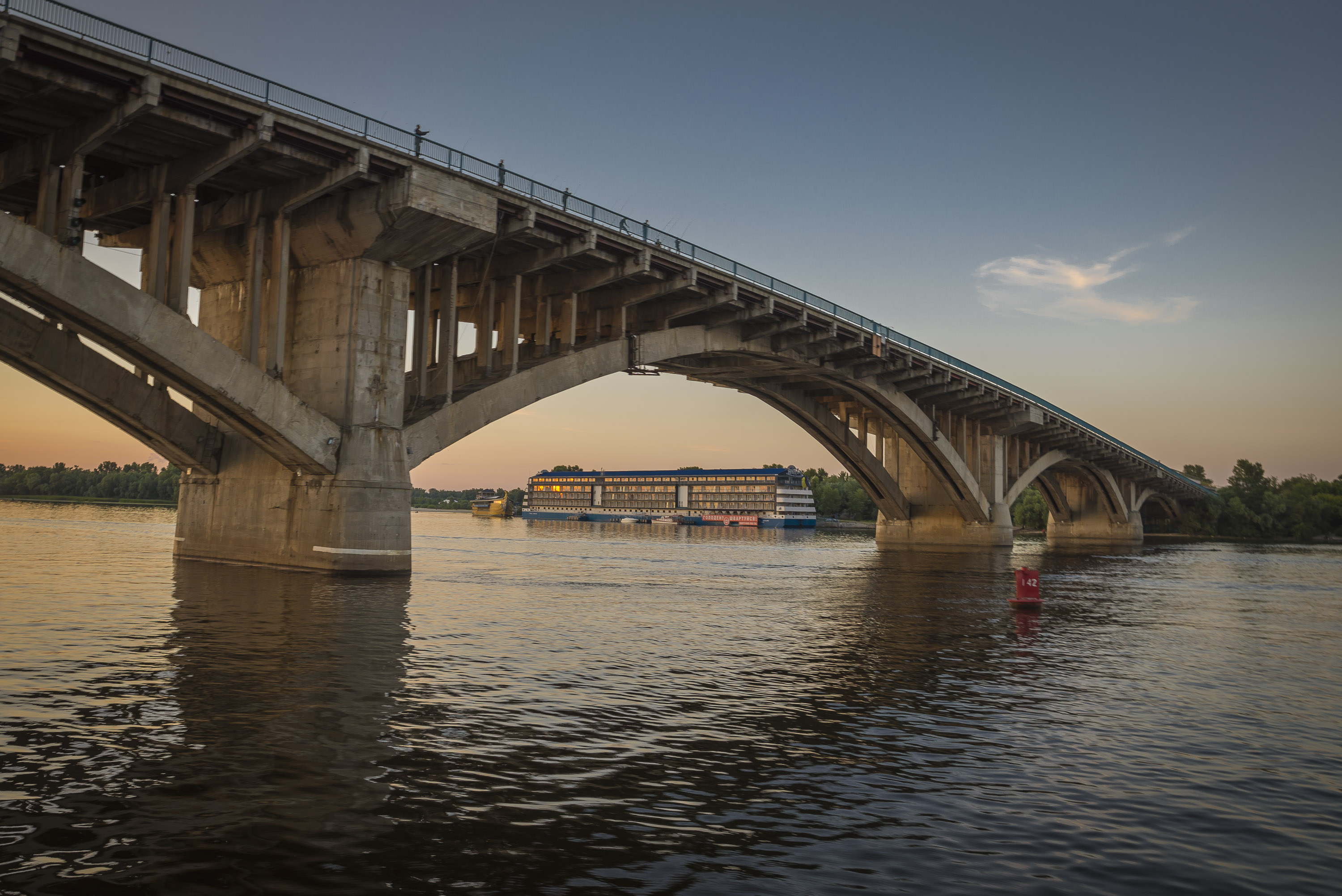

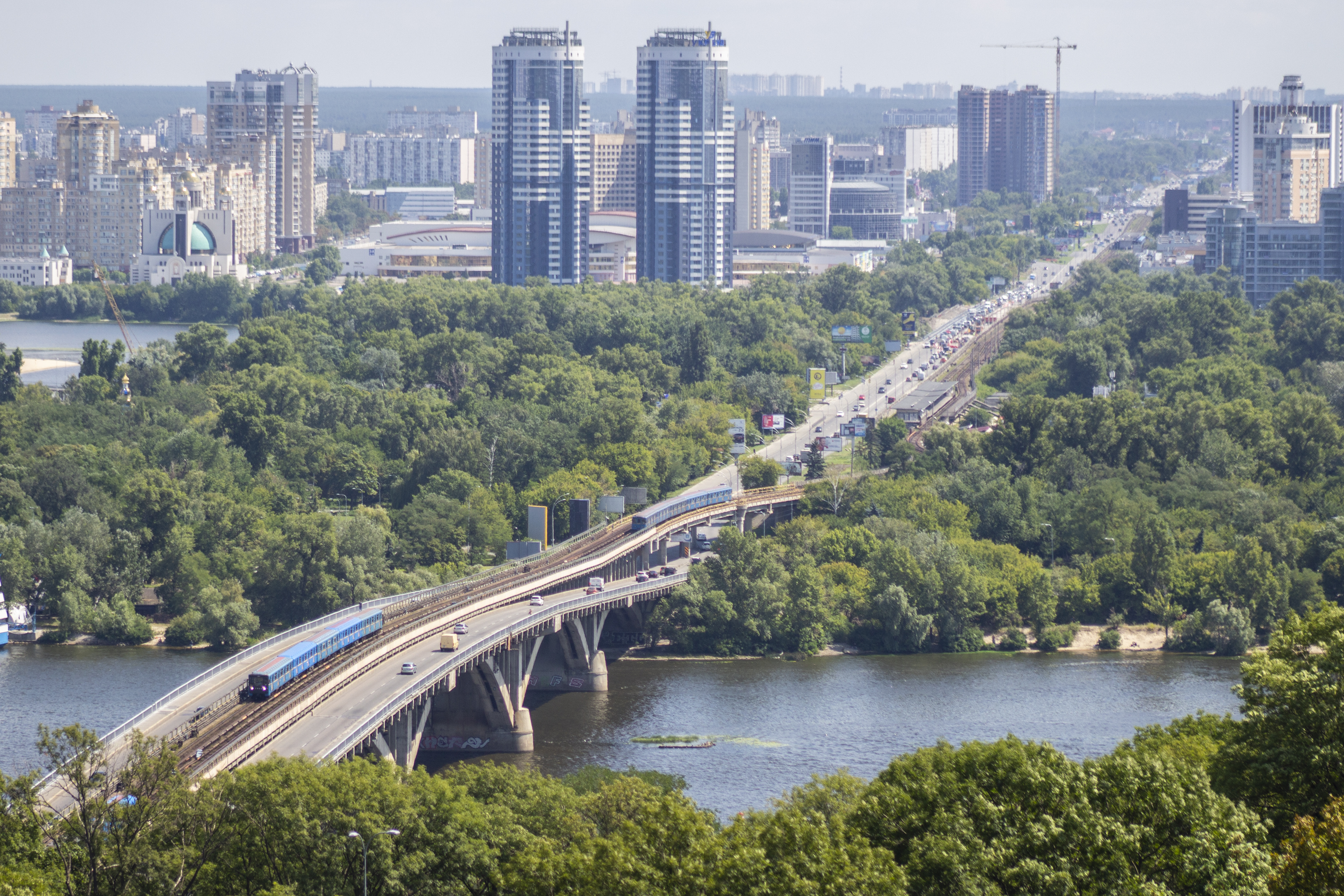
View from the western bank of the Dnieper River

== See also ==
- Bridges in Kyiv
- Nicholas Chain Bridge
