= Prospekt (street) =

Broad, multi-lane and very long straight street in an urban area

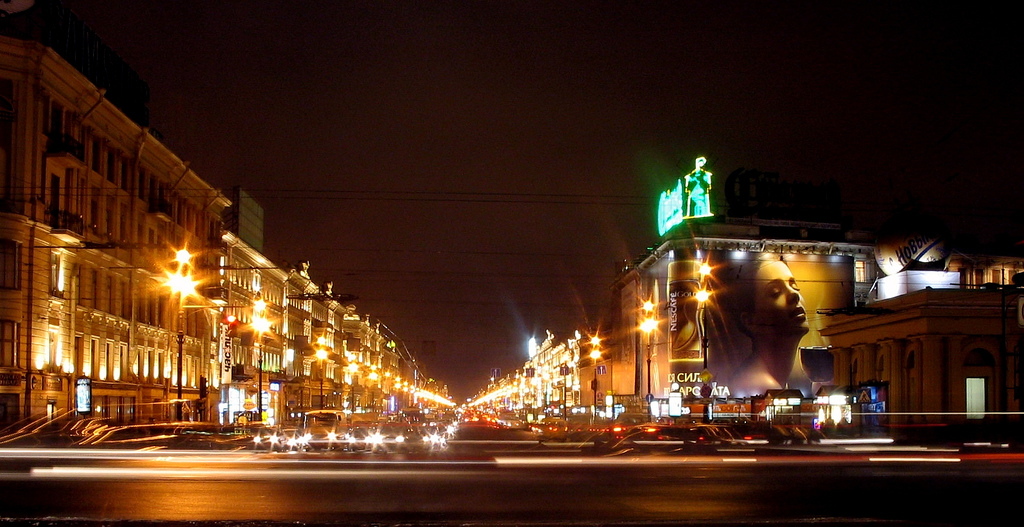
Looking up Nevsky Prospekt in Saint Petersburg at night

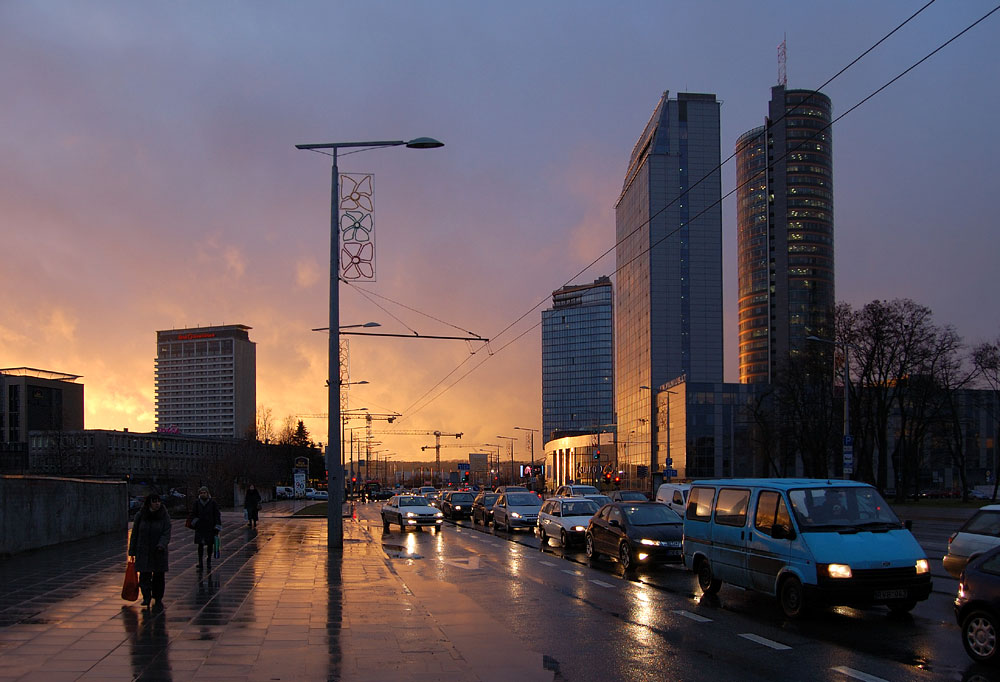
Konstitucijos prospektas in Vilnius, Lithuania

Prospekt (Russian: проспе́кт, IPA: [prɐˈspʲekt]) is a term for a broad, multi-lane and very long straight street in urban areas, which serves as an arterial road. The use of "prospekt" as a road-related concept originated in the Russian Empire.

As an urban area sprawls along transportation routes, the roads outside of city limits called chaussee (French for road surface) often also become converted into prospekts.

== History ==
In the first years of construction of St Petersburg (in the early 18th century), the city's broad ways were called "perspectiva" (Russian: перспектива, literally, visual or graphical perspective). One of the world-known prospekts of Petersburg is Nevsky Prospekt.

The name "prospekt" was widely used in the USSR where it was traditionally used for the main avenues in the newly constructed cities and cities’ blocks. Later on, the term came into the national languages of the Soviet Republics which became independent states in 1991.

== Etymology ==
Russian lexicographer Vladimir Dal in his "Explanatory Dictionary of the Live Great Russian language" marked prospekt as a loanword from French.

Prospekt is cognate with the English term prospect, both derive from Latin prospectus "view, outlook". In the 18th century Russia, prospekt was used specifically for very long straight streets, especially in St. Petersburg, because they afforded a spectacular view from one end to the other when looking down them.

== Notable streets named "Prospekt" ==
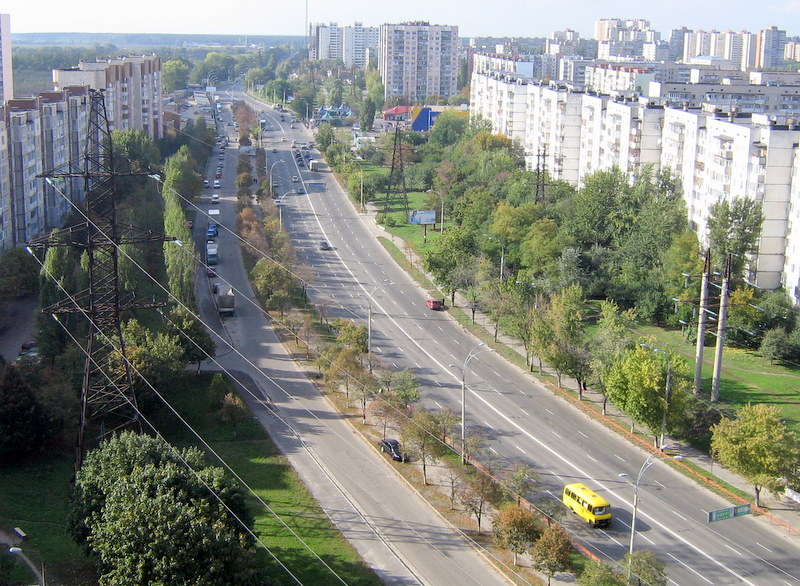
Prospekt European Union, Kyiv

Azerbaijan

- Baku: Neftçilər Prospekt

Russia

- Saint Petersburg: Nevsky Prospekt
- Saint Petersburg: Moskovsky Prospekt
- Moscow: Kutuzovsky Prospekt
- Moscow: Leningradsky Prospekt

Ukraine

- Kyiv: Prospect Beresteiskyi
- Kyiv: Brovarskyi prospect
- Kyiv: Prospekt European Union

Several countries

- Leninsky Prospekt

== Gallery ==
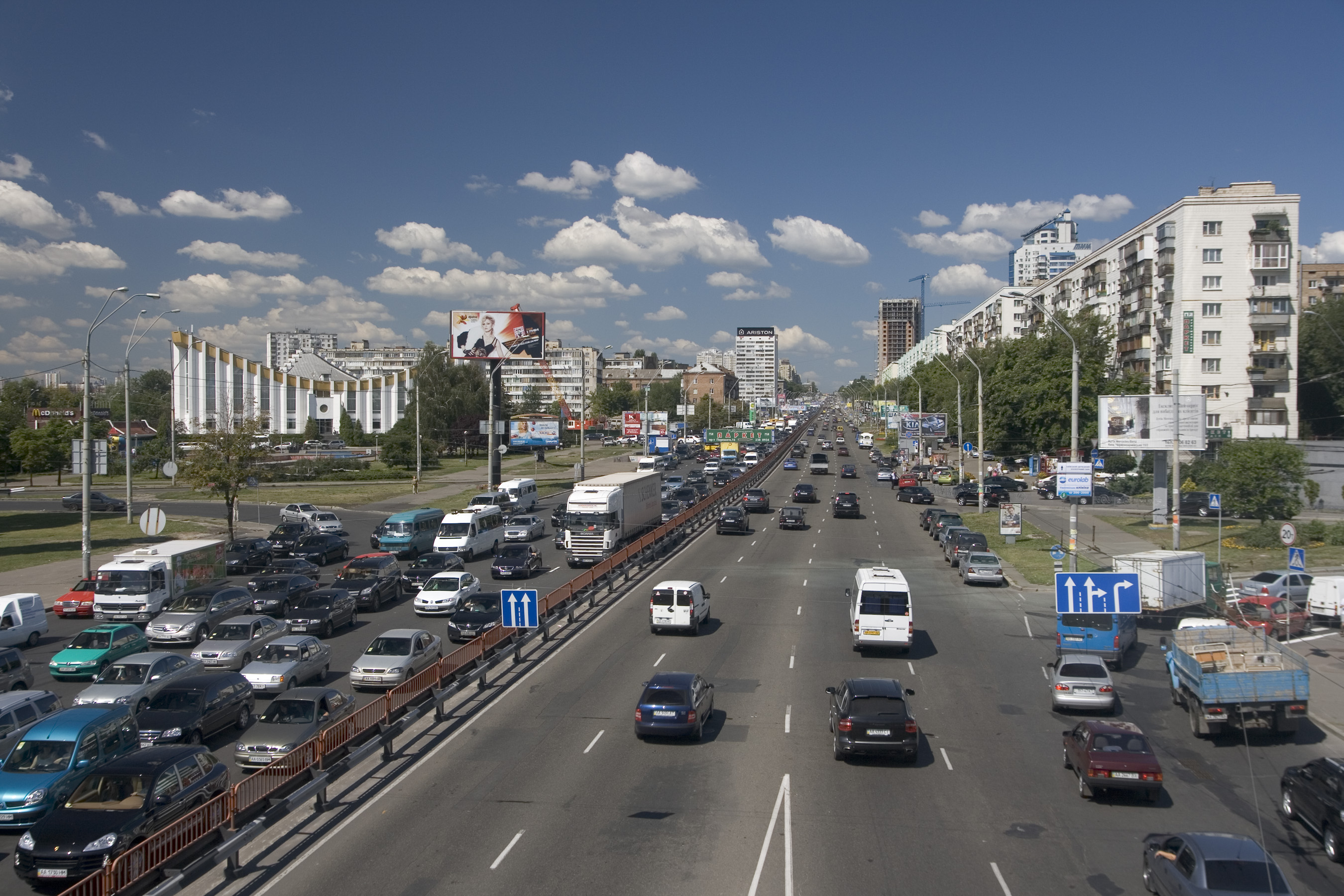
Prospect Beresteiskyi, Kyiv

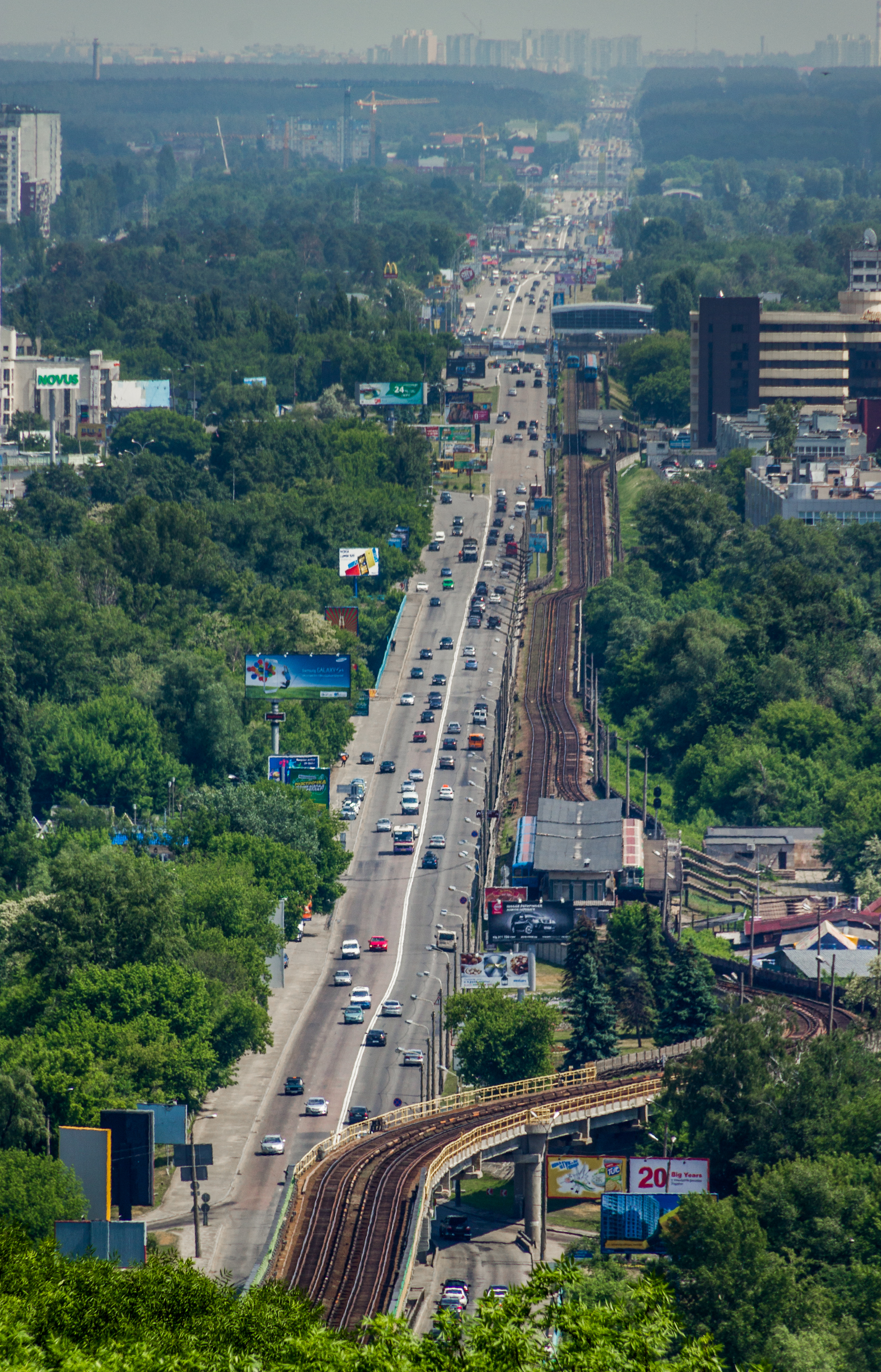
Brovarskyi prospect, Kyiv

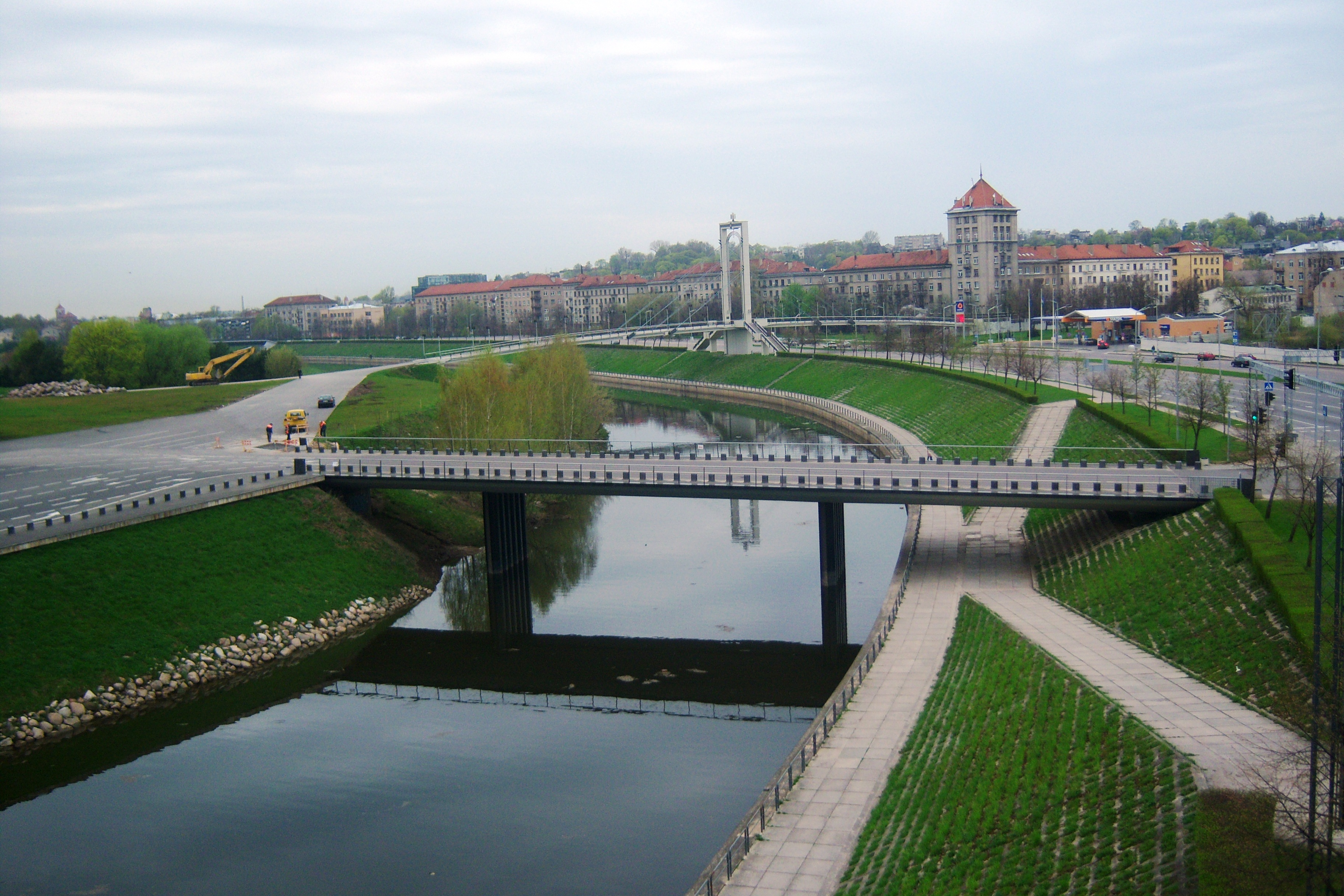
King Mindaugas Prospekt in Kaunas

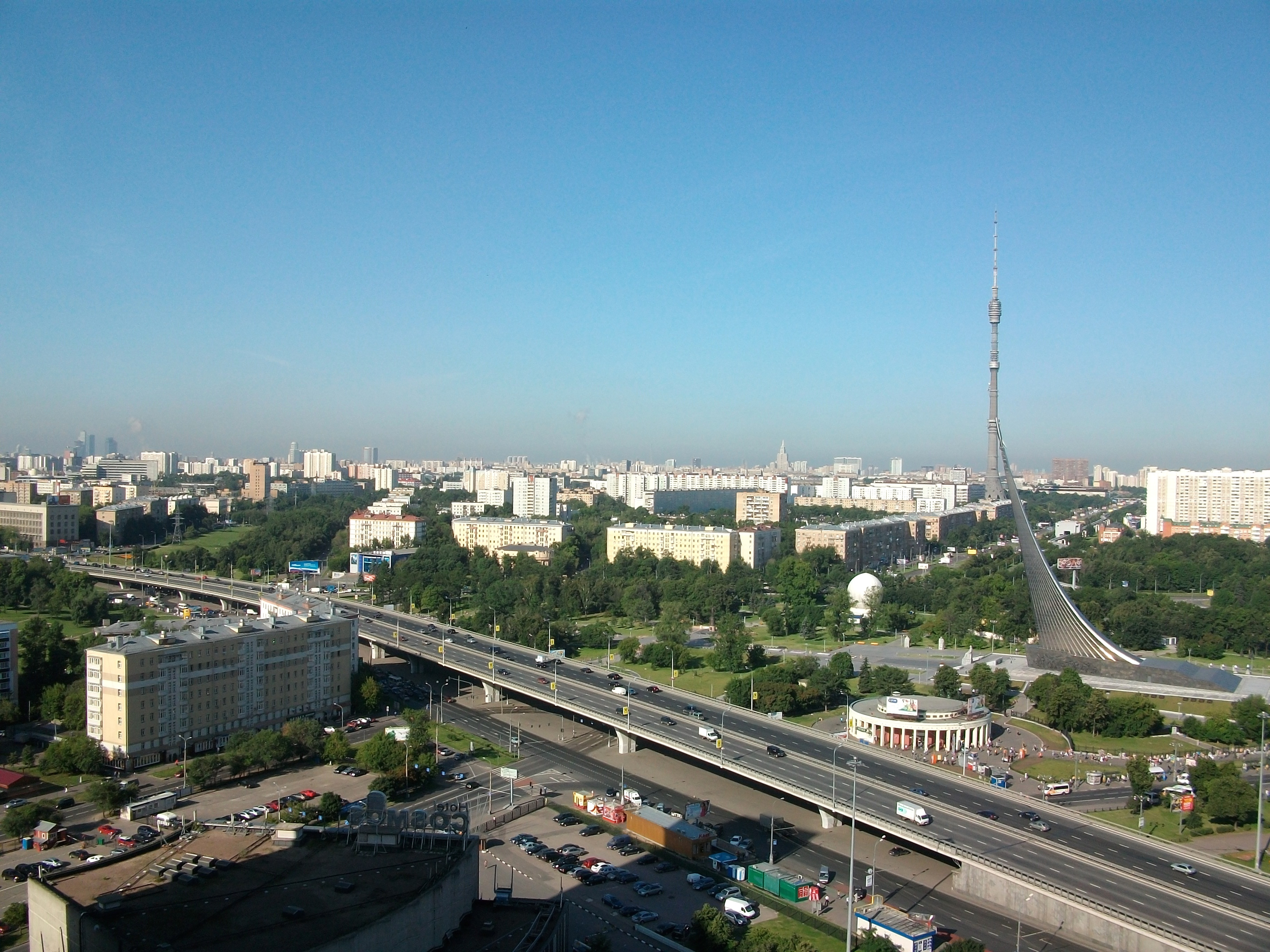
Prospekt Mira in Moscow (in 2009)

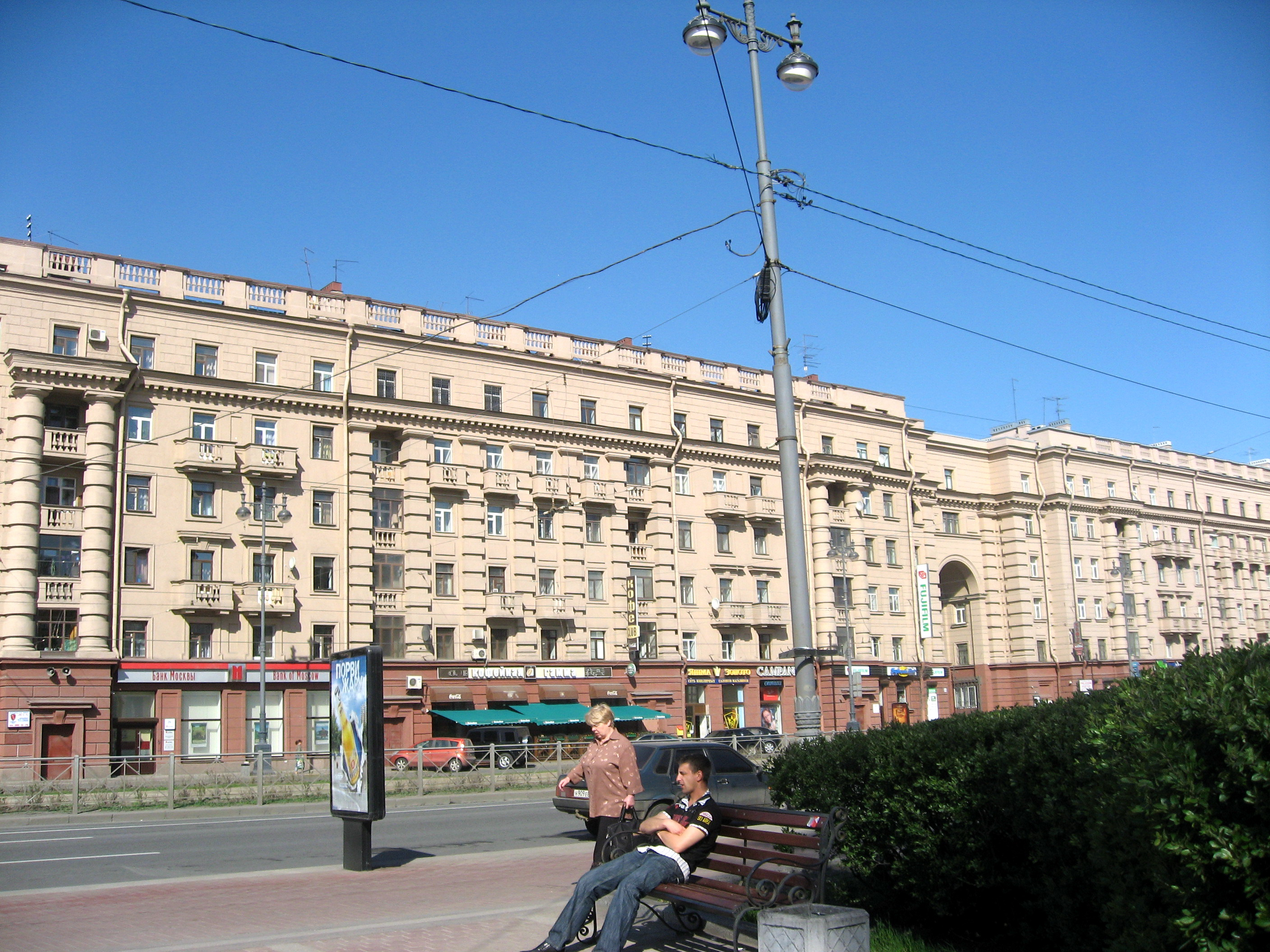
Moskovsky Prospekt (10 km (6.2 mi)) is one of the longest in Saint Petersburg

== See also ==
- Arterial road
- Avenue
- Boulevard
- Link road
- Parkway
- Stroad
