= Shuliavka Republic =

1905 self-declared entity in Kyiv

Shuliavka Republic Шулявська республіка
- 1905
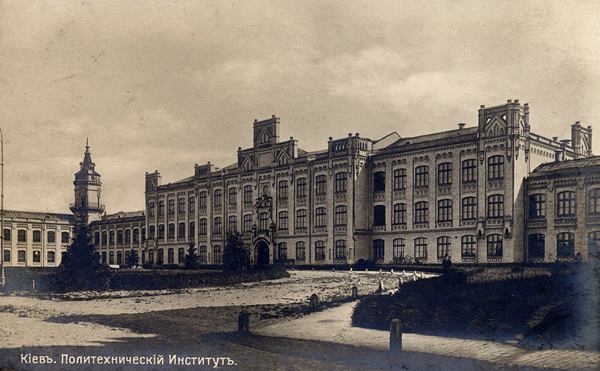
- Early 20th-century postcard depicting the Kyiv Polytechnic Institute, where the uprising was headquartered.
- Government: Republic
- History
  - Established: 12 December 1905
  - Disestablished: 16 December 1905
- Today part of: Ukraine

The Shuliavka Republic (Ukrainian: Шулявська республіка; Russian: Шулявская республика) was a self-declared entity in Shuliavka neighborhood, Kyiv, proclaimed by workers of the factory of Greter, Krivanek, & Co (today Bilshovyk Factory) and students of the Kyiv Polytechnic Institute. The uprising lasted a total of four days, from 12–16 December (O.S.; 26–29 in the Gregorian calendar), 1905. The Shuliavka Republic ended after the Imperial Russian Army put down the uprising.

== Uprising ==
On 11 December 1905 (O.S.), as a sign of support for the December Uprising in Moscow, the Council of Workers' Deputies of Kyiv decided to stage a mass uprising. On the next day, all major city organisations stopped their operation. The majority of the protesting workers were concentrated in the Shuliavka district.

A couple of hours after the start of the uprising, "strict revolutionary order" was established. Groups of about 150 armed workers were sent to patrol the territory, which was headquartered in the first building of the Kyiv Polytechnic Institute.

Shuliavka was declared a workers' republic, where the citywide protest headquarters and the Council of Workers' Deputies were housed. Workers in the district proclaimed the republic as the sole authority in Kyiv. Among the supporters of the protesting workers were students and faculty members of the Polytechnic Institute.

== Manifesto ==
On the first day of the uprising, the Council of Workers' Deputies published their manifesto, which proclaimed:

Citizens of the Shuliavka republic protest for the abolition of absolute monarchy, for the freedom of speech and assembly, for social services, for amnesty of political prisoners, for a national emancipation of Ukrainians, Poles, and Jews, and other nationalities of the Russian Empire, for the immediate end to the Jewish pogroms, which embarrass our people.

In addition, the workers demanded a pension, normal working conditions, the removal of unnecessary fines, better medical services, and a system of government protection.

== End ==
The ongoing conflict between the Bolsheviks and the Mensheviks in the Council and Committee of the Russian Social Democratic Labour Party slowed the growth of the uprising. On 15 December (O.S.), the territory of Shuliavka was surrounded by the Imperial Russian Army and local authorities. The police, who, before then, usually avoided the area, began mass arrests and confiscated any weapons they found. In all, police arrested more than 78 people. On the next day, the uprising was put down by a 2,000-strong armed force consisting mainly of the Special Corps of Gendarmes and Cossack cavalry.
