= Bykivnia graves =

Memorial and mass grave for Soviet dissidents in Kyiv, Ukraine

- Ukrainian: Биківнянські могили
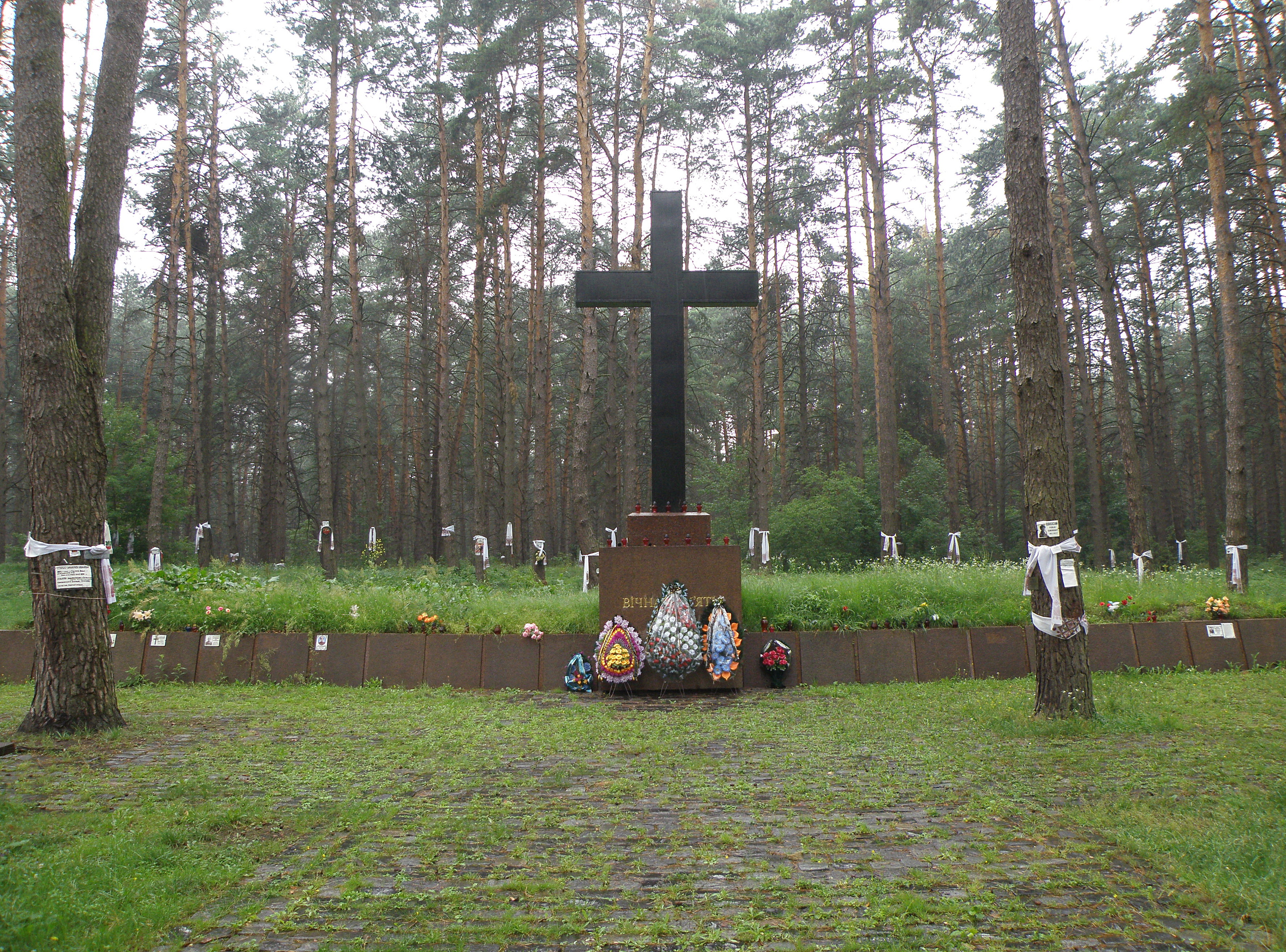
- Bykivnia central monument

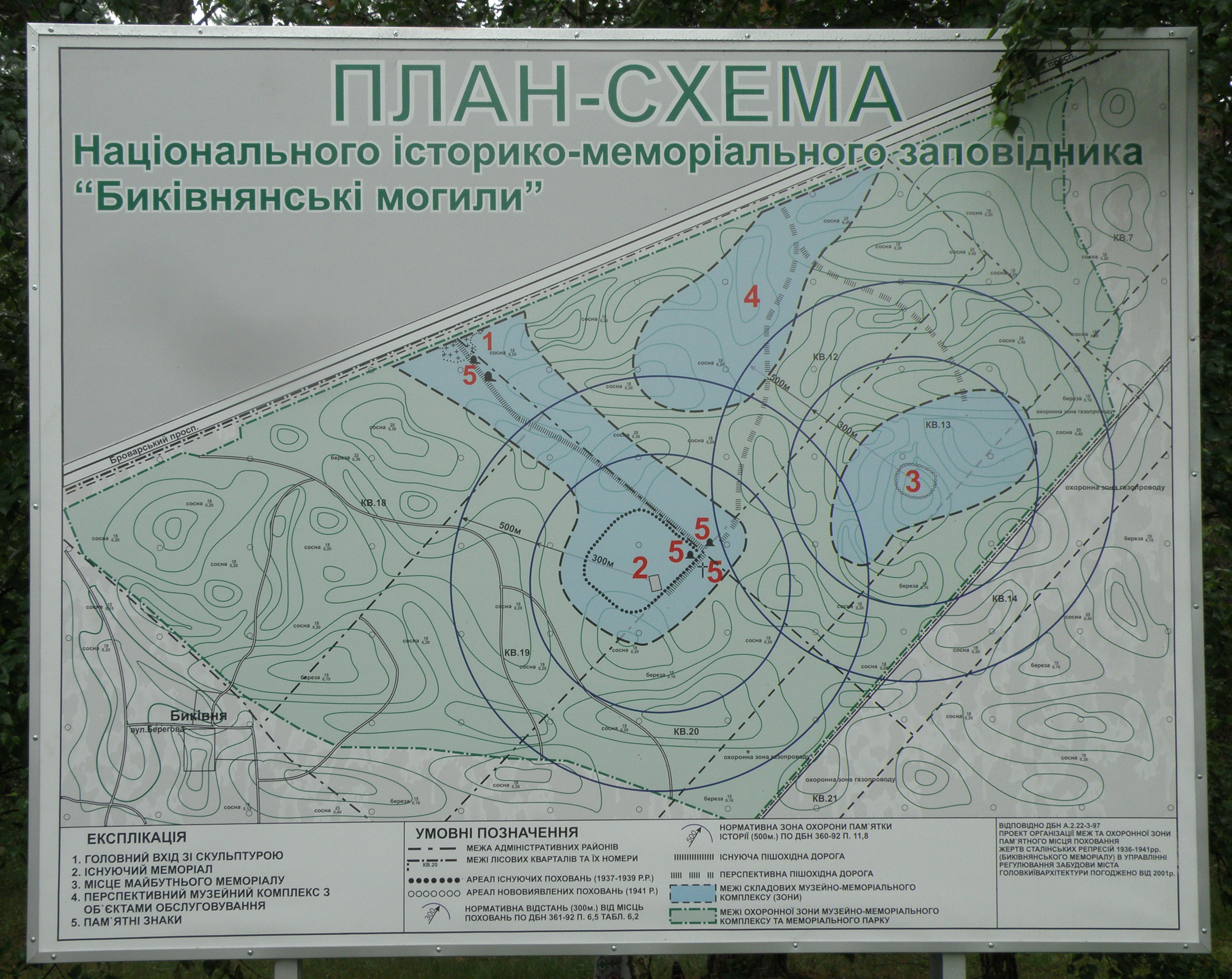
- Map of Bykivnia grave site
- 50°28′N 30°42′E
- Location: Kyiv, Ukraine
- Founded: April 30, 1994 (as a complex)
- Purpose: "To commemorate the victims of political repressions".
- Architects: M. Kysly, R. Kukharenko, V. Chepelyk (sculptor)
- Designation: National Historic-Memorial Reserve
- Established: April 30, 1994
- Type: Memorial site
- Prescribed: May 22, 2001
- Declared: National monument, May 17, 2006

Immovable Monument of National Significance of Ukraine
- Official name: Меморіальний комплекс в пам'ять жертв політичних репресій 1930-х років (Memorial complex in memory of victims of political repressions in the 1930s)
- Type: History
- Reference no.: 260004-Н

The Bykivnia graves (Ukrainian: Биківнянські могили, romanized: Bykivnians'ki mohyly) are a National Historic Memorial next to the former village of Bykivnia (Ukrainian: Биківня, Polish: Bykownia) within Kyiv woodland, Bykivnia Forest. During the Stalinist period in the Soviet Union, it was one of the unmarked mass grave sites where the NKVD, the Soviet secret police, disposed of thousands of murdered "enemies of the Soviet state". Bykivnia as a residential place still exists as a locality with the same Bykivnia Forest. The National Memorial is located across Brovarskyi Prospect from Bykivnia, next to the former Rybne Soviet fishery in the thick of the woods.

The number of dead bodies buried there is estimated between "dozens of thousand", to 30,000, to 100,000. Some estimates place the number as high as 200,000.

== Burial site ==
From the early 1920s until the late 1940s throughout the Stalinist purges, the Soviet government hauled the bodies of tortured and killed political prisoners to the pine forests outside the village of Bykivnia and buried them in a grave that spanned 15,000 square metres (160,000 sq ft). So far, 210 separate mass graves have been identified by Polish and Ukrainian archaeologists working at the site. During the Soviet retreat in the early stages of Operation Barbarossa, Red Army troops levelled the village.

The mass grave site was discovered by the Germans along with many other such sites throughout the Soviet Union. However, following the discovery of the Katyn massacre, the burial sites of Bykivnya were no longer part of German propaganda. After the Soviet recapture of the area during the Second Battle of Kyiv in 1943, the site was again classified by the NKVD. In the 1950s the village was reconstructed as a suburb of Kyiv. In the 1970s the Soviet authorities planned to construct a large bus station on the mass grave site, but the plan was abandoned.

A document attesting to the origins of the Bykivnia victims was found by Polish émigré historians, researching the Nazi German archives after the war. Polish researchers estimate that, apart from the Soviet victims of the Great Terror, the site might be the final resting place of 3,435 Polish officers captured by the Red Army during the Soviet invasion of Poland, together with Nazi Germany in 1939, most of whom were executed in the spring of 1940 with over 20,000 Polish officers and intellectuals in the Katyn massacre.

As the Soviet authorities denied responsibility, there was no way to confirm that the victims of the Stalinist purges were buried there. During the Soviet era the existence of the site was brought up to authorities numerous times with the most famous incident occurring in 1962 when the Ukrainian poet Vasyl Symonenko did so. He was badly beaten by Soviet law enforcement agents and died in the hospital from kidney failure soon after.

=== Commemoration ===
It was not until the 1990s that the authorities of independent Ukraine confirmed the burial of thousands of victims there. On April 30, 1994, a large memorial to the victims of communism was opened in Bykivnia. Around the same time archaeological works started, with both Ukrainian and Polish scientists taking part. In 2001 the government of Viktor Yanukovych proclaimed the will to convert the Bykivnia woods into a State Historical–Memorial Complex "Graves of Bykivnia". The plan was brought to life by Viktor Yushchenko on May 17, 2006.

In a step toward uncovering this part of Ukraine's history, Viktor Yushchenko became the first Ukrainian president to take part in the annual Day of Remembrance ceremony on May 21 to honor the estimated 100,000 people buried in the mass grave on the outskirts of Kyiv. "We must know the truth. Why did our nation lose more than 10 million people without a war?" Yushchenko said during the 2006 event.

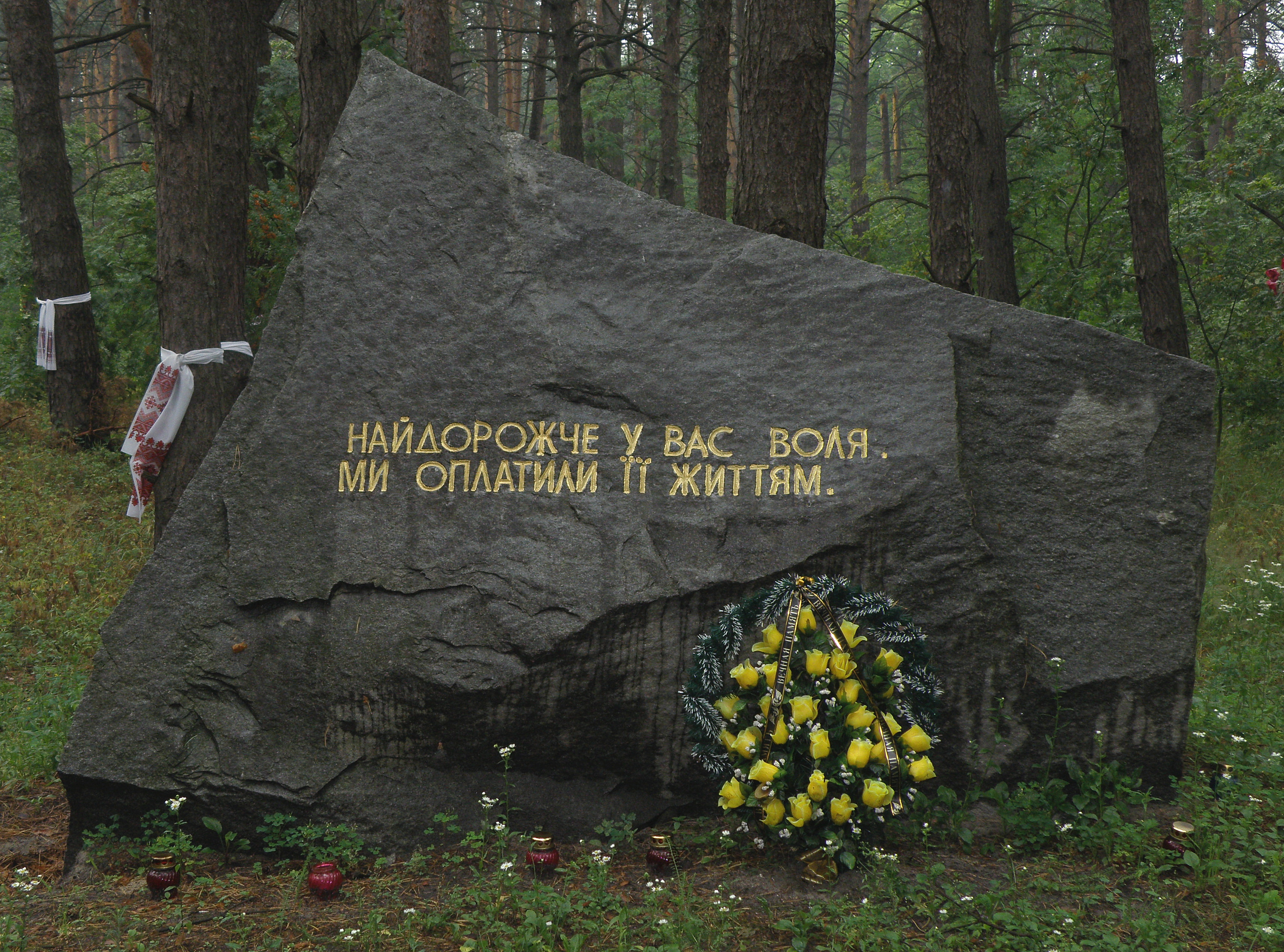
Bykivnia monument. The inscription says: "The most precious thing you have is your freedom. We paid for it with our lives."

Since 2006, Polish researchers have found a number of bodies of Poles, prisoners killed in spring 1940 during the Katyn massacre. Apart from bodies, Polish researchers found everyday items, such as a comb, on which the owner, an unknown Polish officer, carved several names, such as Franciszek Strzelecki, Ludwik Dworak and Szczyrad. This might refer to Colonel Bronisław Mikołaj Szczyradłowski, the deputy commandant of Lwów's defense in September 1939.

A dog tag belonging to a Sergeant Józef Naglik, soldier of the Skalat Battalion of the Border Defence Corps, was found at the same spot. All the names belong to the "Ukrainian Katyn List" of Katyn massacre victims, and serve as proof that Bykivnya is connected to the Katyn crime.

== Notable victims ==
- Andriy Bandera
- Mykhail Semenko
- Maik Yohansen
- Mykola Ivasyuk
- Mykhailo Boychuk
- Vasyl Verkhovynets
- Veronika Chernyakhivska
- Stepan Shagaida

== See also ==
- Dem'ianiv Laz, a mass grave site near Ivano-Frankivsk
- Great Purge
- Katyń Massacre
- Kurapaty, a similar mass grave site near Minsk, Belarus
- Svirlag
- Vinnytsia massacre
- Vasyl Symonenko
- Mass graves in the Soviet Union
