= Shevchenkivskyi District, Kyiv =

Coordinates: 50°28′26″N 30°30′07″E

Shevchenkivskyi District Шевченківський район
- Urban district in Kyiv
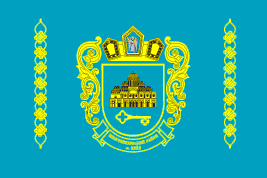
- Flag Coat of arms

- Country: Ukraine
- Municipality: Kyiv Municipality

Area
  - Total: 27 km^{2} (10 sq mi)

Population
  - Total: 220,077
  - Density: 8,339/km^{2} (21,600/sq mi)
- Time zone: UTC+2 (EET)
  - Summer (DST): UTC+3 (EEST)
- Metro stations: Universytet, Vokzalna, Politekhnichnyi Instytut, Shuliavska, Beresteiska, Nyvky

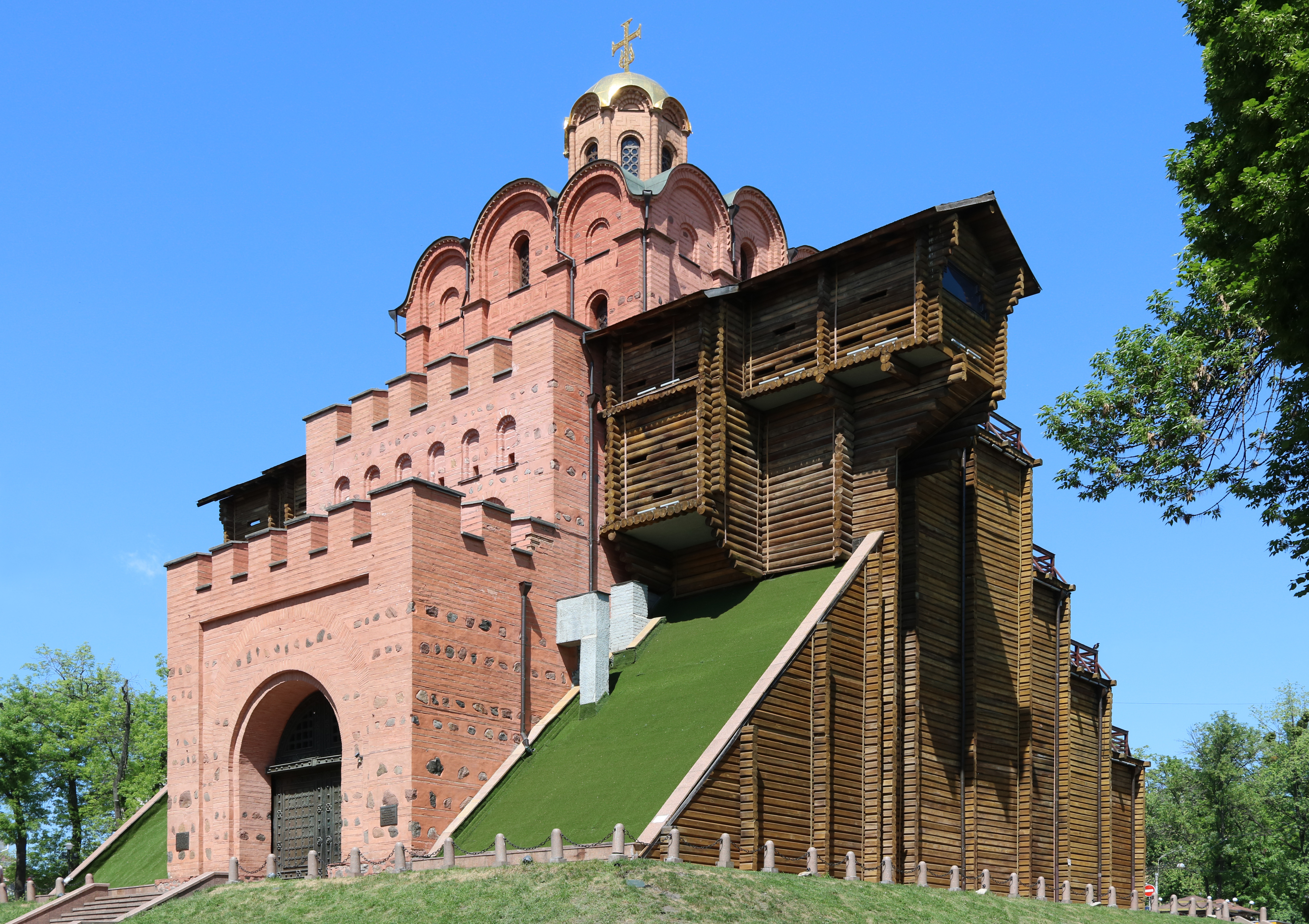
View of the Golden Gates after recent major renovations.

The Shevchenkivskyi District (Note: Ukrainian: Шевченківський район, romanized: Shevchenkivskyi raion, IPA: [ʃeu̯ˈtʃɛnkiu̯sʲkɪj rɐˈjɔn]) is an urban district of the city of Kyiv, the capital of Ukraine. It was originally established on 4 April 1937, although in 2001 its area was increased following an annexation of the former Radianskyi and Starokyivskyi districts.

The district is historically significant, as it was here on the Old Kyiv mount where the apostle Saint Andrew erected the cross; also, the famous Golden Gate of Kyiv, the main entrance to the medieval city of Kyiv, is located in the district, as are the three major churches of the city: Saint Sophia, Saint Michael and Saint Andrew. Furthermore, in this district the first parliament of Ukraine met at the Ukrainian Club Building and declared Independence in 1917.

== Population ==
=== Language ===
Distribution of the population by native language according to the 2001 census:

Language	Number	Percentage
Ukrainian	145 553	64.65%
Russian	72 356	32.13%
Other (Note: Those who did not indicate their native language or indicated a language that was native to less than 1% of the local population.)	7 246	3.22%
Total	225 155	100.00%

== Attractions ==
The district also has the local opera house and several universities, such as Taras Shevchenko National University of Kyiv and Kyiv National Economic University. It also houses the National Academy of Sciences of Ukraine on the Volodymyrska Street. Kyiv Zoo, local zoo, is also located here. The other no less important landmarks of the district are historical monuments such as churches and cathedrals: Sophiivs'kyi Cathedral, Volodymyrs'kyi Cathedral, Mykhaylivs’kyi Zolotoverkhyi Monastery, and others. Also place where the Orange Revolution took place, Maydan Nezalezhnosti is in the district and is adjacent to Khreshchatyk street. Other attractions located in the district are Peremohy Square, Besarabskyi Market, Babyn Yar and Kyiv TV Tower.

== Location ==
Main streets are: Khreshchatyk street, Volodymyrska Street, Prospect Beresteiskyi (Shevchenko Boulevard), Dehtiarivska Street, Olena Teliha Street, Melnykov Street, and others. The district borders with Podil to the north; Pecherskyi District, Holosiivskyi District, and Solomianskyi District to the south; and Sviatoshynskyi District to the west.

In June 2008 the Kyiv City Council renamed Kominterna Street (located in this district) to Symon Petliura Street to commemorate the occasion of his 130th birthday anniversary.

In February 2023 Prospect Peremohy was renamed to Prospect Beresteiska by the Kyiv City Council.

== Neighborhoods ==
- Old Kyiv
- Kudryavets
- Soldatska slobidka
- Tatarka
- Lukyanivka
- Shuliavka
- Syrets
- Nyvky

Shuliavska (Shuliavka) includes Ivan Bahrianyi Park (until 2023 called Pushkin Park) and Kyiv Zoo to the north, south of which is the Kyiv Polytechnic, while the Kosmopolit Mall (Cosmo Multimall) and the Shuliavska Metro station lie at its western end. To its northwest lies Nyvky, and Syrets to its north and Lukyanivska in the north-east. It is traversed by Prospect Beresteiskyi one of the major arterial roads of Kyiv.

== Twin towns ==
- Ursus, Warsaw, Poland

== See also ==
- Shuliavka Republic
