= Nyvky =

Neighbourhood of Kyiv

Coordinates: 51°21′N 29°07′E

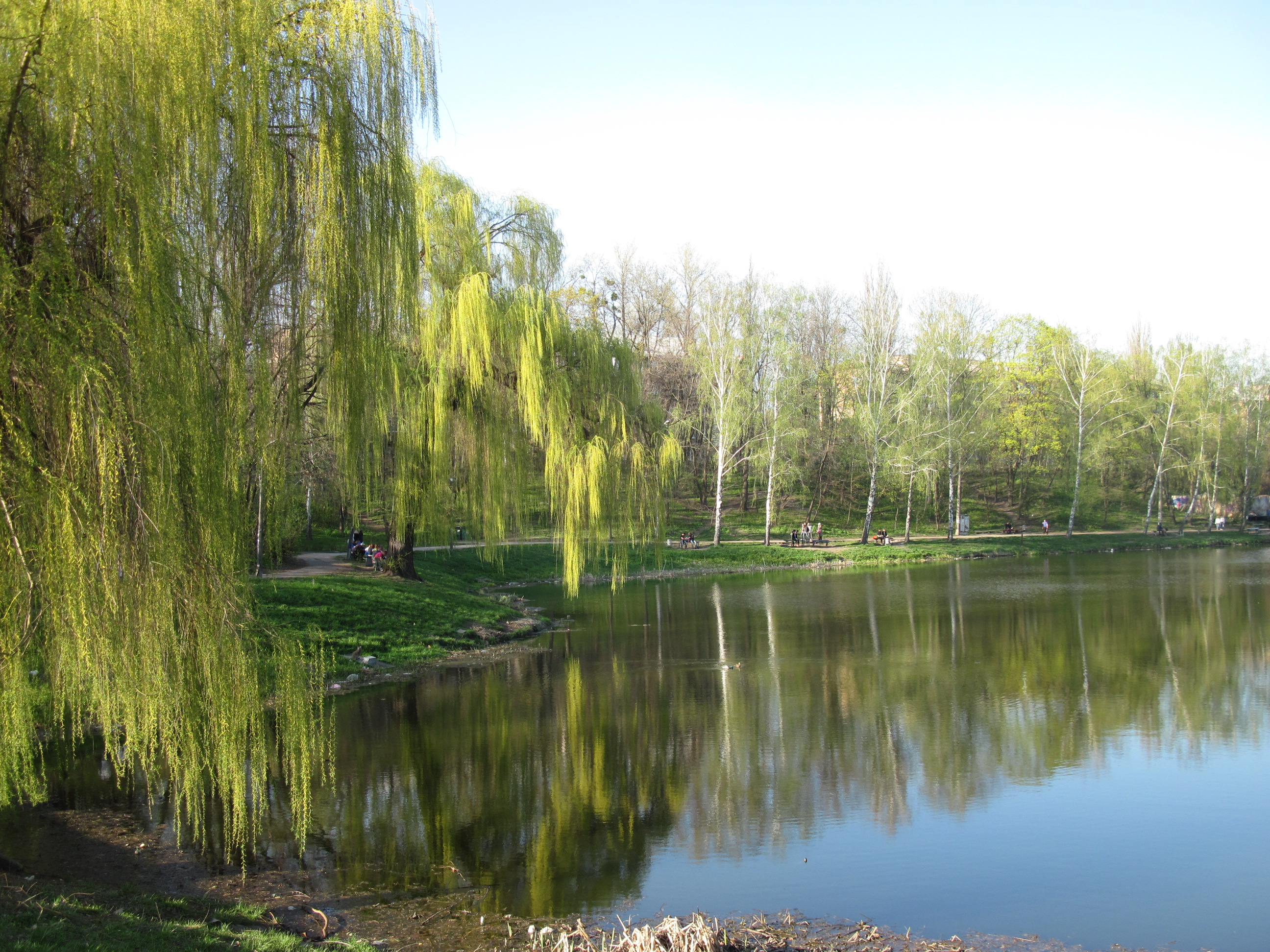
Nyvky park

Nyvky (Ukrainian: Нивки) is a neighbourhood in Kyiv, Ukraine. It belongs to Shevchenkivskyi District of Kyiv. It is surrounded by Svyatoshyn (in Sviatoshynskyi District) to the west, Shuliavka to the south-east, Vidradnyi (in Solomianskyi District) to the south, Syrets to the east, Vynohradar, and Berkivtsi.

It is not connected with the Nyvka River, which flows through Kyiv in a westerly direction from Svyatoshyn along the Borshchahivka settlement chain - the opposite direction from Nyvky, which lies to its east.

== Etymology ==
The name Nyvky is derived from a grain field that was located along the Brest-Litovsky highway (today Prospect Beresteiskyi).

== History ==
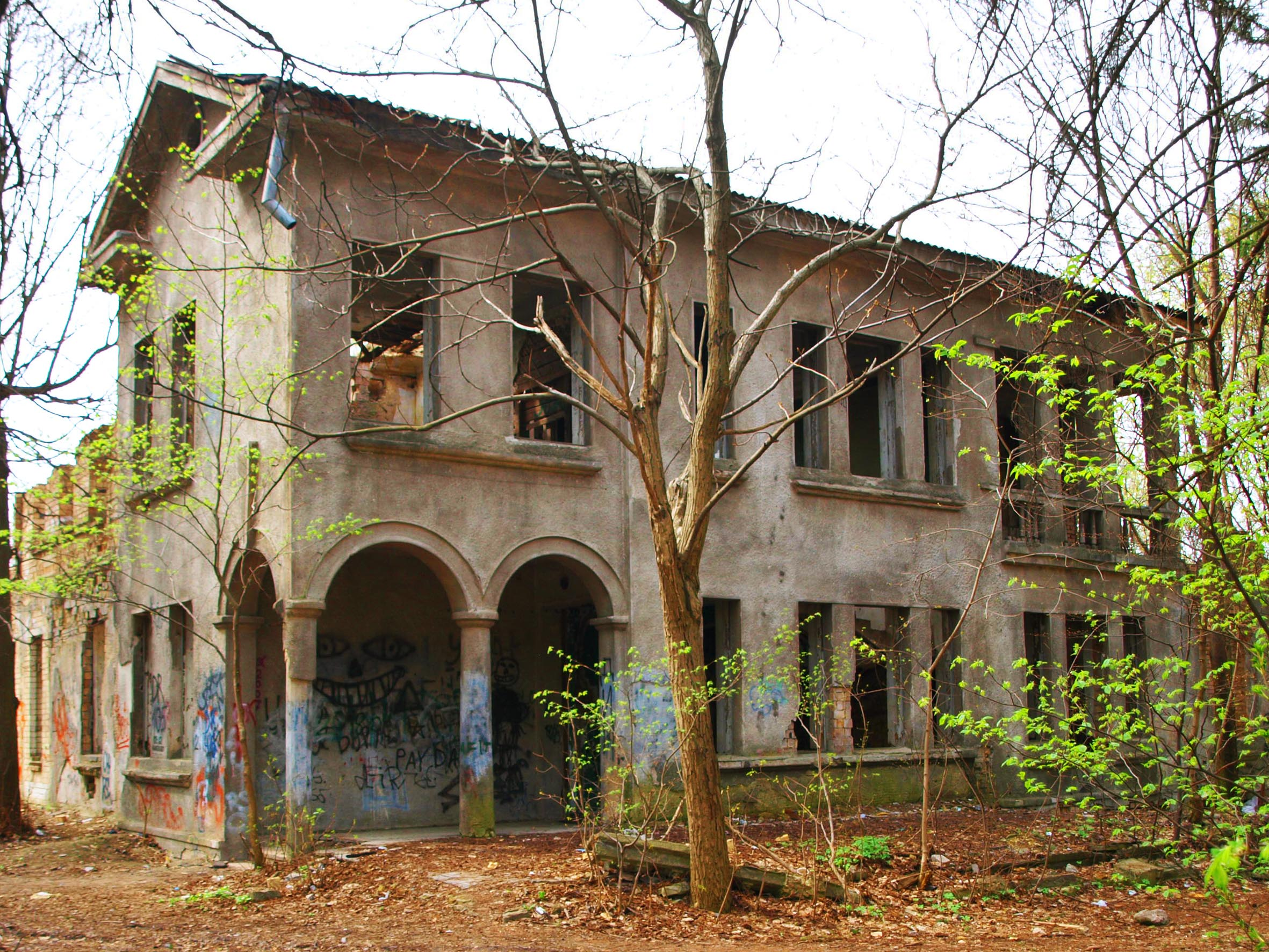
Ruins of the government dacha, which used to serve as a residence of Ukrainian Soviet officials including Nikita Khrushchev

In the 1850s it was the site of the khutir (hamlet) of Fuzykivka that was established by Fuzyk family from the village of Bilychi (today also a neighborhood of Kyiv). In 1870s, a farmstead and a dacha there named "Nyvky" was being rented out.

In the beginning of the 20th century, khutir Nyvky was part of Bilhorodka volost, Kyiv county (uyezd). It had five homecourts with population of 27, along with three brick shops. At that time Nyvky included also such neighborhoods like Vovcha Hora and Rubezhivka. In 1923 the khutir was merged with the city of Kyiv.

== Infrastructure ==
Notable institutions in Nyvky include the National Pedagogical Dragomanov University, Kyiv Exposition Center, the Dynamo Kyiv youth football training academy, Kadetskyi Korpus Liceum, Nyvky City Business Park, and the Verkon factory. It is also home to Nyvky Park, Park Dubky, and Dubovyi Hai Park.

Nykvy metro station (on the Sviatoshynsko–Brovarska line) was built here in 1970. Rubezhivskyi train station is located next to Nyvky Park on the Syrets River. Nykvy is also close to Sviatoshyn Airfield.

== In the Russian invasion of Ukraine ==
Nyvky has been hit by air strikes in the Russian invasion of Ukraine, beginning 2022. In March 2022, a multiple-missile strike damaged various residential buildings in Nyvky. In September 2024, a missile strike severely damaged Nyvky's Crimean Tatar mosque. Nykvy metro station, like others on the Kyiv Metro, has been used as an air raid shelter.
