= Prospect Beresteiskyi =

Major east–west road in Kyiv, Ukraine

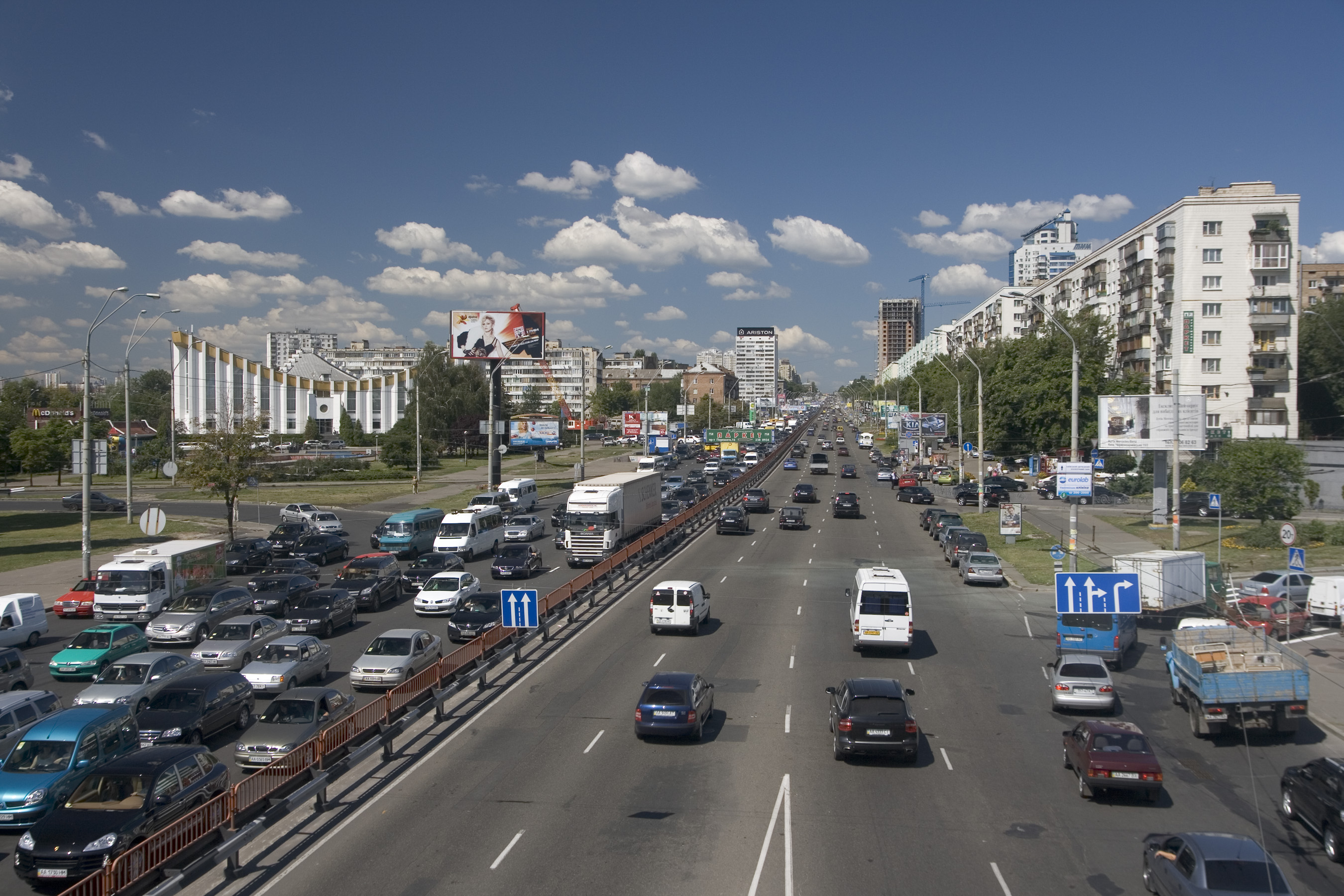
- Prospect near the Povitroflotskyi overpass
- Former names: Prospect Peremohy; Brest-Litovski prospect
- Length: 7.3 mi (11.7 km)
- Width: 4-5 lanes each way
- Area: Shuliavka, Hrushky, Kazenni dachi, Halahany, Nyvky, Sviatoshyn, Bilychi
- Location: Kyiv, Ukraine
- Postal code: 01135, 03047, 03056, 03057, 03062, 03113, 03115, 03179, 03680, 04116
- Coordinates: 50°27′12″N 30°19′39″E
- Northwest end: Beresteiskyi highway
- Southeast end: Halytska Square

Construction
- Commissioned: 1964

Prospect Beresteiskyi (Ukrainian: Проспект Берестейський, pronounced [proˈspɛkt bereˈstɛjsʲkɪj], lit. 'Brest Avenue') is the second-longest public roadway (prospekt) in Kyiv, Ukraine. The roadway was created in the second half of the 20th century (1964) as part of the urbanized area of the Brest-Lytovske highway and was known as Brest-Lytovskyi prospect (Ukrainian: Брест-Литовський проспект, romanized: Brest-Lytovskyi prospekt, lit. 'Brest-Litovsky Avenue'). At the beginning of the Soviet perestroika period in 1985, it was renamed to Prospect Peremohy (Ukrainian: Проспект Перемоги), for the 40th anniversary of the victory of the Soviet people in the Great Patriotic War. It gained its current name in February 2023.

== History ==
Originally being terminated at the Povitroflotskyi overpass, in 1985, when it was renamed, the prospect was extended all the way to the Halytska Square which until 1985 was part of boulevard Tarasa Shevchenka.

Through Halytska Square and boulevard Tarasa Shevchenka, the roadway reaches Khreshchatyk at Bessarabska Square.

Along the streets are located various important institutions of government, education and culture.

It is part of the former M 06 business route (currently rerouted along the Kyiv Great Ring Road). Along the prospect are located several overpasses and bridges (Povitroflotskyi, Shuliavskyi, over the Railway crossing, Kovelskyi, over the Great Ring road, and Havanskyi bridge). There are also six metro stations of the Sviatoshynsko–Brovarska line as well as three railway stations.

== Significant buildings ==
- #10 – Ministry of Education and Science
- #14 – Ministry of Infrastructure
- #13 – Sky Towers
- #32 – Kyiv Zoo
- #34 – Bogomolets National Medical University
- #37 – Igor Sikorsky Kyiv Polytechnic Institute
- #44 – Dovzhenko Film Studios
- #49/2 – Bilshovyk Factory (formerly Greter and Kryvanek Co.)
- #50 – "Presa Ukrainy" Publishing
- #54 – Hetman National Economic University
- #67 – Kyiv Machinebuilding Factory "Verkon"
- #82 – Park "Nyvky"
- #83 – ATEK
- #97 – Svyatoshynskyi District Administration (Kyiv city)
- #100 – Antonov Serial Production Plant (formerly Aviant)
- #126 – Kyiv-Sviatoshyn Raion Administration

== See also ==
- Brovarskyi prospect
- Povitrianykh Syl Prospect
