= Politekhnichnyi Instytut (Kyiv Metro) =

Kyiv Metro Station

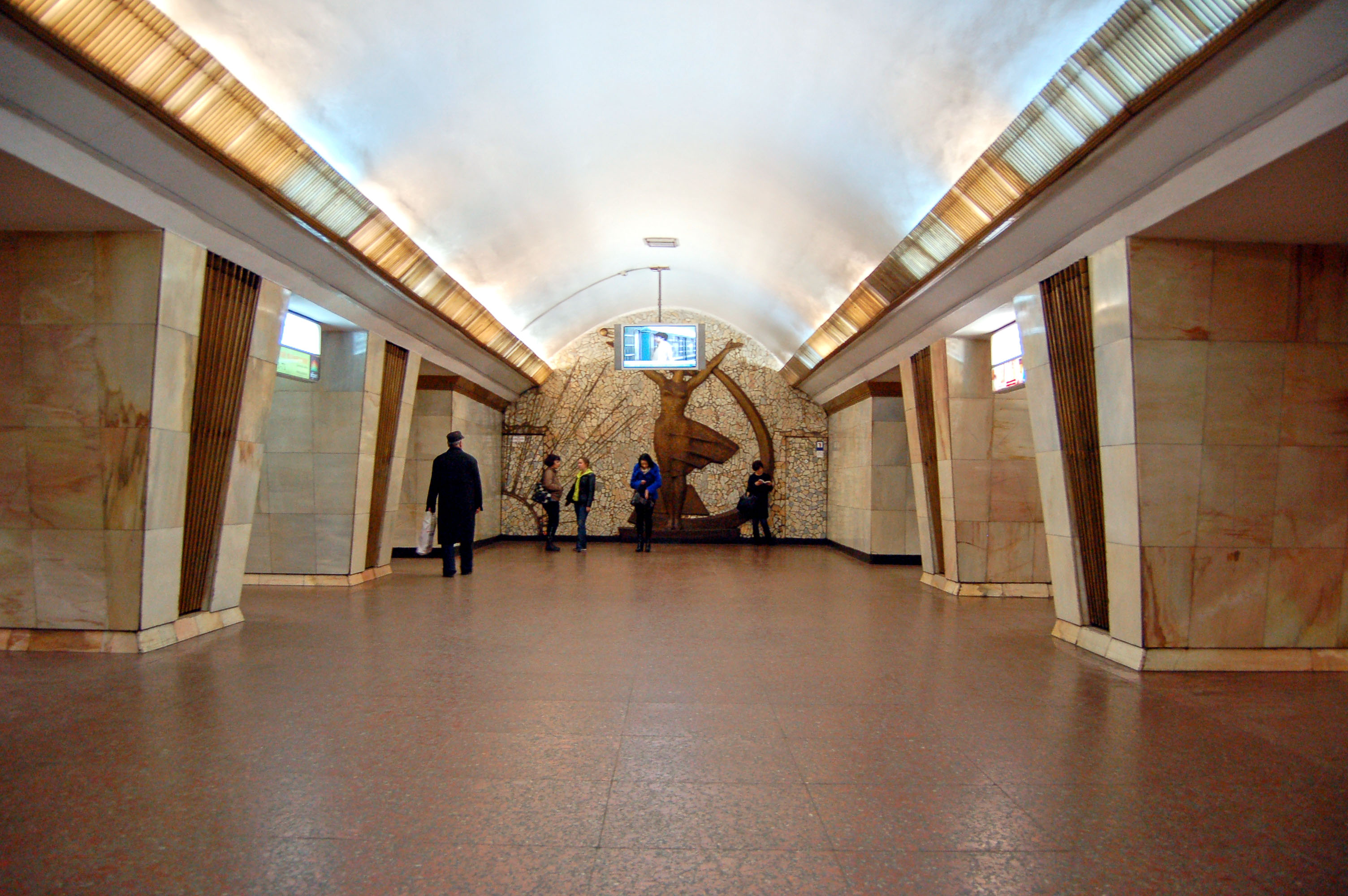
- The Station Hall

General information
- Location: Solomianskyi District; Kyiv; Ukraine
- Coordinates: 50°27′03″N 30°27′59″E
- System: Kyiv Metro station
- Owner: Kyiv Metro
- Line: Sviatoshynsko–Brovarska line
- Platforms: 1
- Tracks: 2

Construction
- Structure type: underground
- Depth: 55 m (180 ft)
- Platform levels: 1

Other information
- Station code: 116

History
- Opened: 5 November 1963

Services
| Preceding station | Kyiv Metro | Following station |
|---|---|---|
| Shuliavska towards Akademmistechko | Sviatoshynsko–Brovarska line | Vokzalna towards Lisova |
Location

Politekhnichnyi Instytut (Ukrainian: Політехнічний інститут,) is a station on Kyiv Metro's Sviatoshynsko-Brovarska Line in Kyiv, Ukraine. The station was opened on 5 November 1963, and is named after Kyiv's Polytechnic Institute located near the station. It was designed by G.V. Golovko, B.V. Dzbanovsky, E.L. Ivanov, and M.M. Syrkin.

The station has been laid deep underground and consists of a central hall with rows of columns near the platforms. It is connected to the street level by three escalators. The entrance to the station is located on the ground floor of the Kyiv Metro administration building, on the corner of Peremohy Prospekt (Victory Avenue) and Politekhnichna Street.

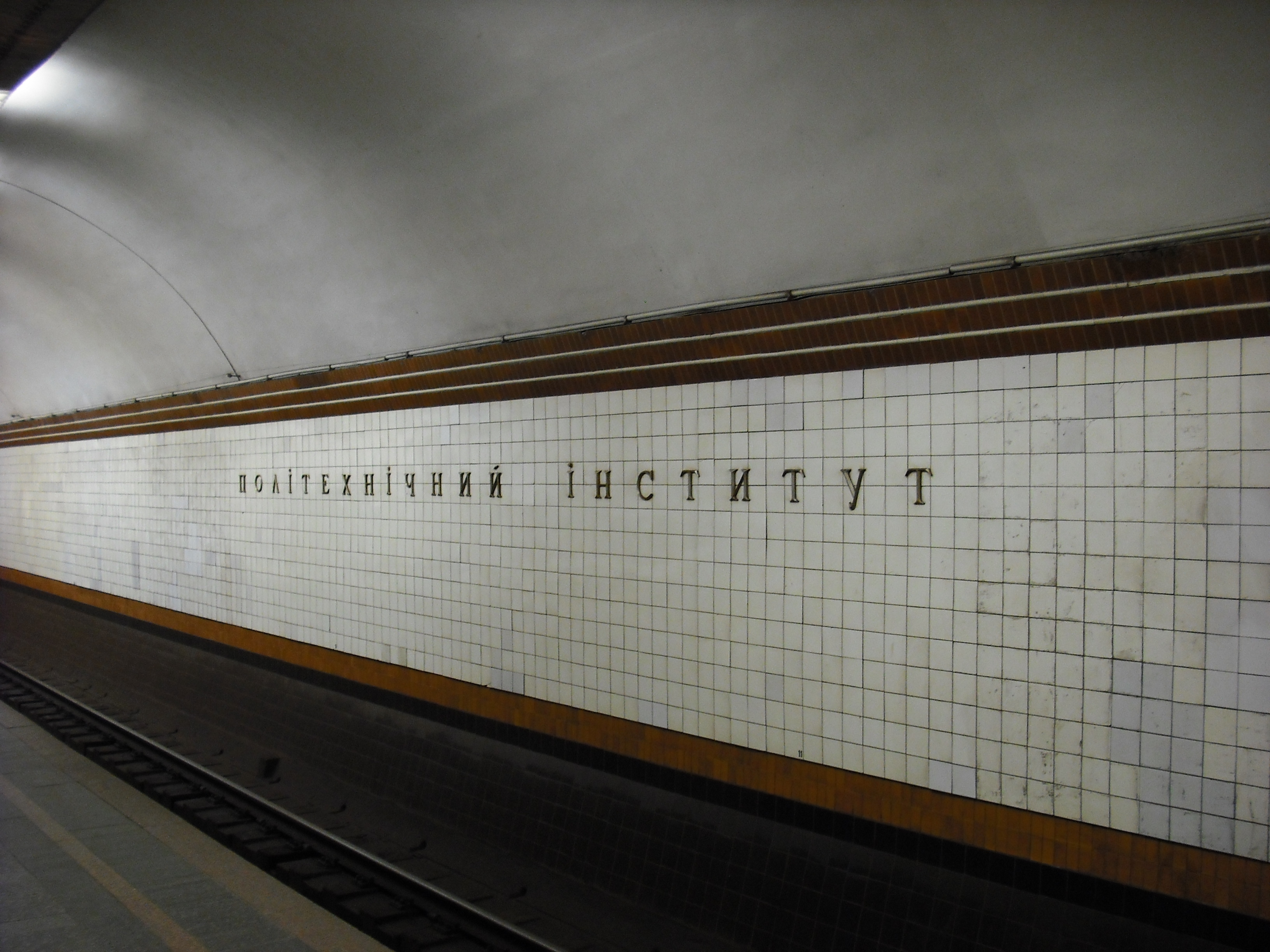
