= Chaussee =

Term in some countries for a paved road

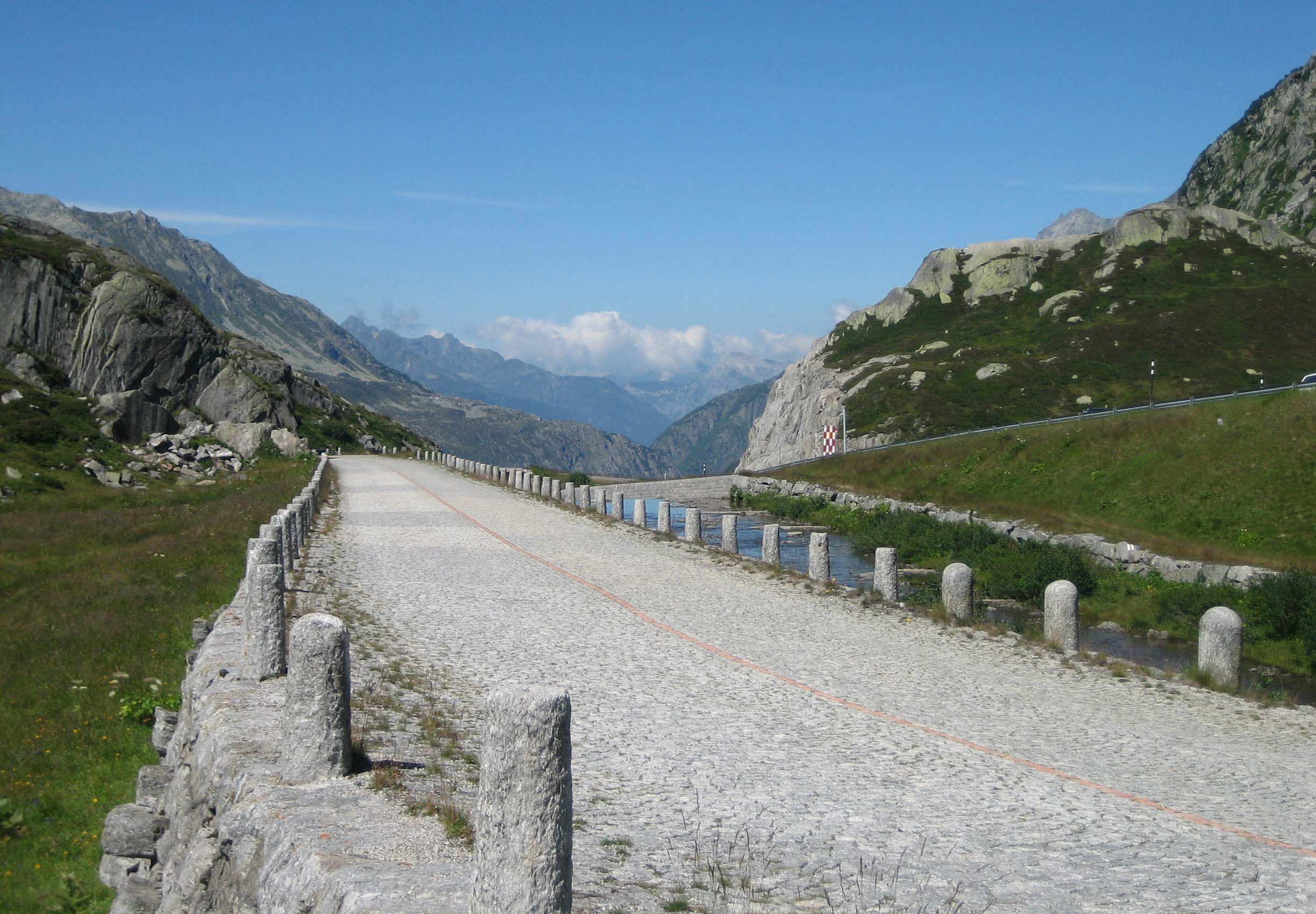
The chaussee over the Sankt Gotthard was built in 1827–1830

Chaussee is an historic term used in German-speaking countries for early, metalled, rural highways, designed by road engineers, as opposed to the hitherto, traditional, unpaved country roads. The term is no longer used in modern road construction in Western Europe, but survives in road names and is used by historians. In Eastern Europe and the post-Soviet states it remains a generic term for a common paved highway outside of built-up areas, but they may transition into prospekts within towns and cities.

== Origin of the word and usage ==
The German word Chaussee was borrowed from the French chaussée by the German construction industry in the 18th century. The French word, in turn, went back to the Gallo-Romanic via calciata and meant a road surfaced with firmly compacted crushed rock bound with lime. Contemporary German translations of the word were Straßendamm ('road embankment') and Hochweg ('high way') and even the roughly similar English word, highway. Around 1790, Adelung complained that "several new authors have proposed German names" but these expressions "do not capture the concept either, and may be used for every other type of artificial way [Kunststraße]". The word Kunststraße ('artificial road') then established itself but, in the main, the French word entered the German language as a loanword.

Today many road names end in -chaussee. Hamburg has retained the term in its street names (Elbchaussee, Eimsbüttler Chaussee etc.), Berlin likewise (Potsdamer Chaussee, Johannisthaler Chaussee), whilst in Bremen in 1914, the chaussees were renamed, following a decision by its citizens, as Heerstraßen (literally 'military roads'). In Aachen and Münster the term Steinweg ('stone way') is used instead. This also occurs in Flemish as steenweg.

== Definition ==
Chaussees or Kunststraßen were extra-urban roads that were constructed with a solid pavement; they were designed by engineers and were therefore much straighter. They differed from ordinary country roads in that, in addition to the pavement, the embankment and subgrade, or road bed, were also artificially constructed. Adelung explained the term as

an artificially raised way made of gravel or crushed stone, such a road being distinguished from a Damme which is paved with cobblestones.

—

=== Technology ===
The concept of chaussees was developed in the Netherlands in the 18th century using brick to reinforce the man-made road embankments. It was followed later in England – as "macadamised causeways" (German: Chausseen mit Makadam) by road builder, John Loudon McAdam (born 1756) using gravel paving - was further developed in France, and from there arrived in the German-speaking region as a result of the French occupation of Prussia under Napoleon I (1807-1813). During the establishment of the Military Frontier in the Banat region of Austria-Hungary, where there was a lack of rock, the Dutch brick road method was used. The building of chaussees in North Germany resulted in a significant reduction in the number of fieldstone erratics on and alongside the fields.

In addition to its paved surface, the chaussee was characterised by a fully developed drainage system. The porous base course and gentle camber of the road surface assisted drainage, for which associated ditches (Chausseegraben) were dug alongside the road.

Often the chaussee comprised a stone carriageway (Steinbahn) and a so-called summer track (Sommerweg). The stone carriageway was the paved section with a base course of gravel or broken rock as a subgrade and a covering of sand and loam. The summer track was for unshod animals. It ran next to the stone track and was unmetalled or only lightly metalled and not usable in winter.

By planting regular rows of trees, the benefits of an avenue could be realised: protection from sun and wind as well as better orientation. Additional aids sometimes included a continuous row of milestones.

The routing of chaussees was also increasingly demanding. For example, they had to follow "the shortest possible distance between two given points" as well as "gradients that were not too inclined from the horizontal (three to five per cent), in order to keep the demands on animal-drawn vehicles and brakes low; they should have lay bys (24 - 30 feet wide, i.e. eight to ten metres), and also be secure from flooding, i.e. built on a raised embankment, where they run through lowland."

In introducing the chaussee concept in the 18th/19th centuries, Europeans once again reached a technological standard for long distance highways that had not been seen since Roman roads were built.

=== Role of the chaussee in the road network ===
The first roads of the chaussee type were built in Western Europe in the early 18th century, coming from Holland at the end of the baroque period. For example, in Swabia, the first road was built in the chaussee design between Öttingen and Nördlingen in 1753.

After the Napoleonic Wars, during which the importance of well constructed roads became recognised - for military logistical and strategic reasons - not least because of the use made by the French of forced marches (up to then war strategy was based primarily on the garrison concept, i.e. the stationing of non-mobile troops), but also express mail services developed, thinking moved increasingly towards the concept of trunk roads (Fernstraßen), whose importance was based both on the comfort of individual road users and for reasons of national interest. In Prussia, for example, the construction of chaussees, especially after the Stein-Hardenberg reforms (1807) certainly served military purposes. This created a basis for improving the flow of trade during the early industrial period, even before the railway era began.

For the Altona-Kiel Chaussee opened in 1832, for example, the benefit is quantified: a coach needed 16 hours on the old road, but only 9 hours on the somewhat longer chaussee. A messenger on horseback covered the route in six hours. Because of the stable substructure and smoother road surface, a horse and cart could carry three times the load.

Along the chaussees, at a distance of about one and a half hour's travel, then a league (German: Meile), road huts (Chausseehäuser) were built for the money collectors (Chausseegeldeinnehmer), thus introducing an early form of toll system. In the office of the chaussee watchman (Chausseewärter), who had responsibility for a section of road, there was also the forerunner of state-organized, road maintenance: the roadmender. The watchmen reported to a chaussee engineer (Chausseebaumeister) who was the road construction inspector (Wegebauinspektor) responsible for the road.

As a result of the chaussee, road engineering standards and the road traffic regulations were also given impetus. Pierer pointed out in 1860:

chaussee regulations, which usually specify the weight that a carter can load, the wheel gauge that a cart must have, specify the width of the wheel rims (the 6 inch rims pay either no, or very little, toll money, because they use the chaussee; in other countries narrow rims for goods carts are prohibited), prohibit the blocking of places where it is not absolutely necessary, forbid blocking the track, specify which side of the road to pass (mostly on the right, but on the left in Austria), determine fines for driving on the footpath, etc.

—

The chaussee was also, important for urban development. With the advent of the chaussee, the concept was born of a major road running right to the gates of a town or city. And with the demolition of fortifications in the Gründerzeit period of the late 19th century, the avenue and boulevard appeared in the form of urban axes or ring roads as access roads to the chaussee.

== See also ==
- Carriageway
- École des Ponts ParisTech, originally called École nationale des ponts et chaussées or ENPC

== Literature ==
Contemporary:

- Arnd: Der Straßen- u. Wegebau. 2nd ed., Darmstadt, 1831.
- Umpfenbach: Theorie des Neubaues etc. der Chausseen. Berlin, 1830.
- Dietlein: Grundzüge über Straßen-, Brücken- u. Wasserbau. Berlin, 1832.
- Heinrich Pechmann: Anleitung zum Bau der Straßen. 2nd ed., Munich, 1835.
