= Lisovyi masyv =

Coordinates: 50°28′39″N 30°37′53″E

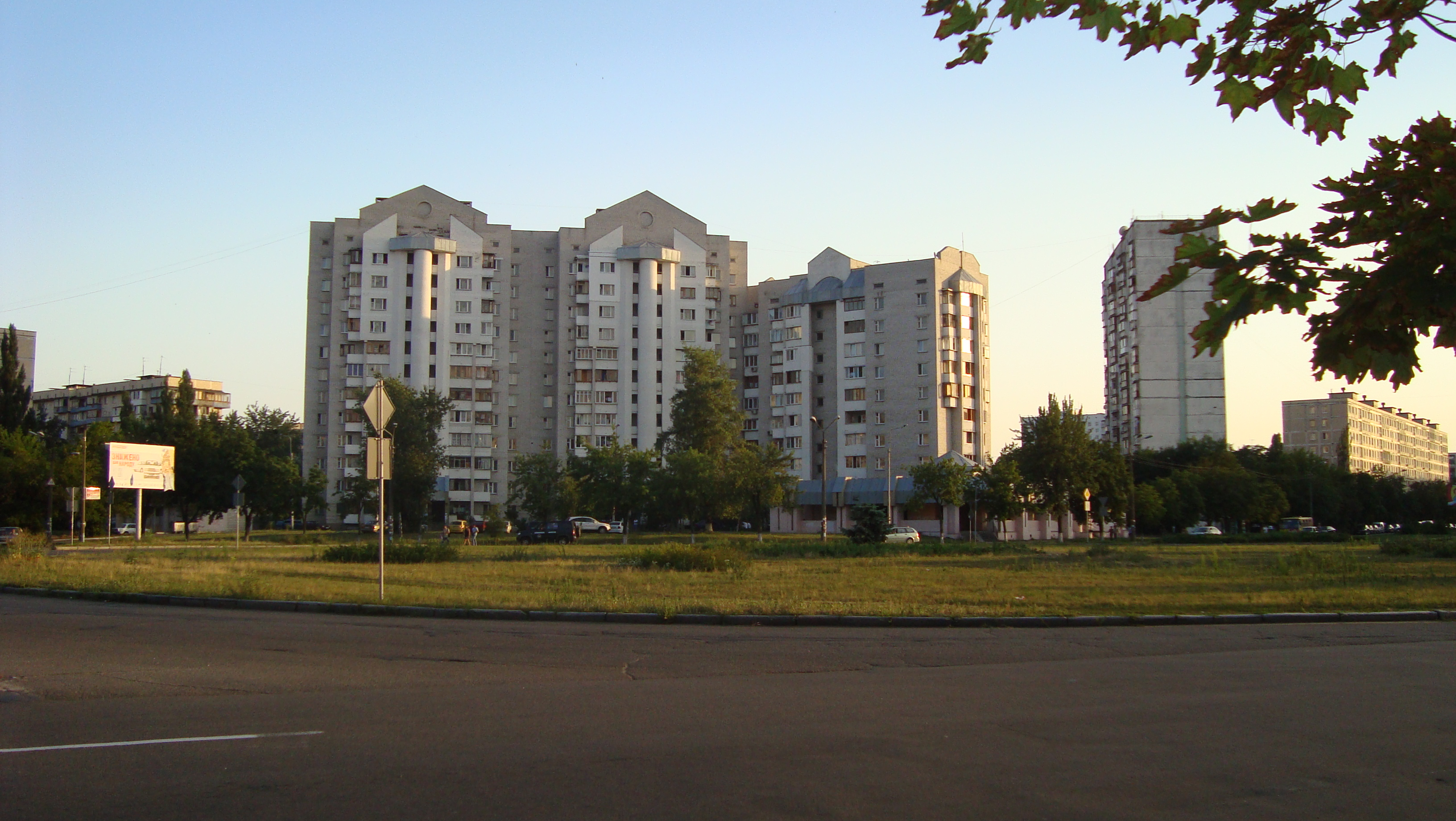
Konotop battle Square

Lisovyi masyv (Ukrainian: Лісовий масив literally: Forest neighbourhood) is a neighbourhood (city superblock) located in the northeast part of the city of Kyiv, the capital of Ukraine.

It is located next to the Bykivnia Forest and the residential neighborhood appeared in 1965–73, originally known as Vodopark.

Its northern and eastern boundaries are bordered with forests, hence its name; its western boundary is bordered by the Bratyslavska Street, and its southern boundary by the Brovarskyi Prospect.

Aside of kindergartens and general education schools, the Lisovyi masyv contains the Kyiv National University of Trade and Economics.

The Lisovyi masyv is served by the Kyiv Metro station, Lisova, from which travel the city's buses, trolleybuses, and marshrutkas (private minibuses).
