= Ministry of Defence building (Ukraine) =

Coordinates: 50.443°N 30.4791°E

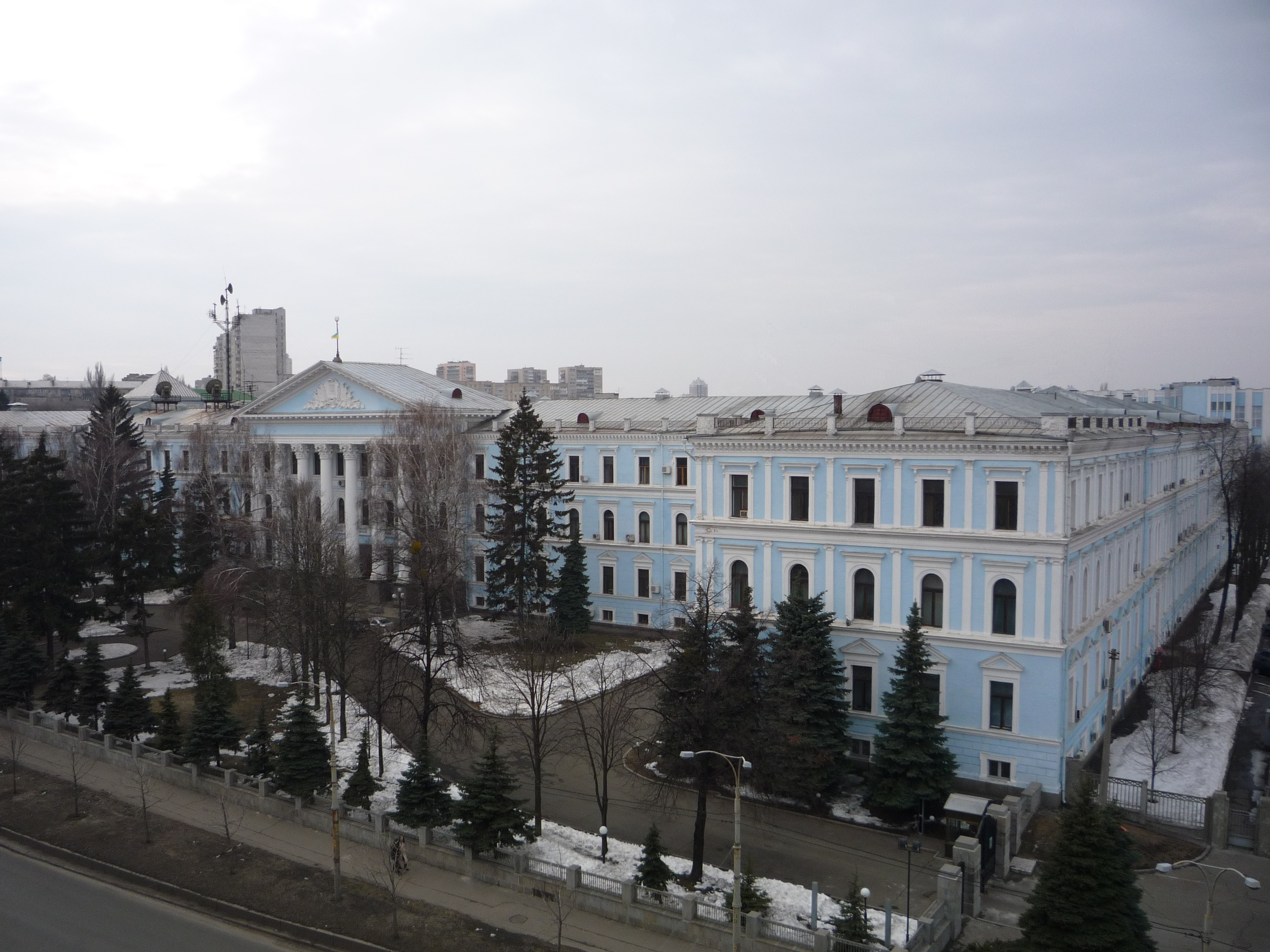
The Ministry of Defence building

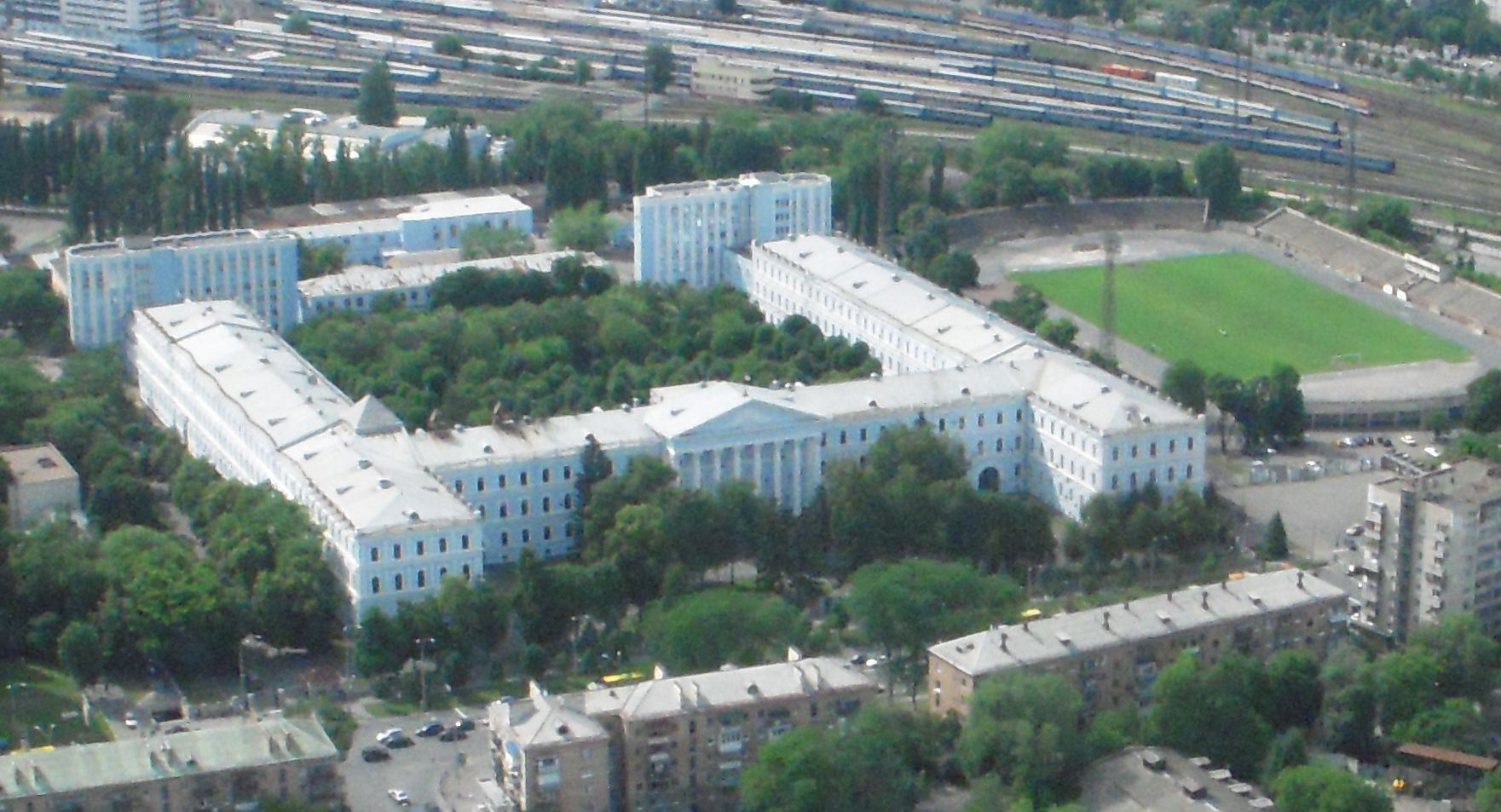
Overview of the building, with the CSK ZSU Stadium on its right

The Ministry of Defence building is a government building in Kyiv that houses the Ministry of Defence of Ukraine. The building, originally constructed as the Saint Vladimir Cadet Corps, was built to the design of Russian architect Ivan Shtrom.

== History ==
In 1847, the nobility from several Southwestern (Ukrainian) Russian guberniyas (Kyiv, Volyn, Podolie, Kherson and Tavrida) collected 200,000 rubles for the construction of a school building for children of nobles from those guberniyas. The nobles also agreed to pay 67,000 silver rubles to the school annually for education, and they petitioned to name the school after the newly born Grand Duke Vladimir Alexandrovich of Russia.

Emperor Nicholas I of Russia granted the petition, and in the same year, he visited Kyiv to pick a spot for the new school. In the meantime, it was agreed to temporarily conduct all classes in the First Kyiv Gymnasium (today the 'Yellow Building' of Kyiv University). The construction was entrusted to the Russian architect Ivan Shtrom and stretched for some 10 years. The building was finally completed on August 30, 1857, and it housed some 400 students.

The school changed hands during the Ukrainian–Soviet War of 1917 to 1920, and normal education was interrupted. From June 1920 until World War II, the building housed the 5th Kyiv Infantry School. During the occupation of Kyiv by Nazi Germany, the building served as army barracks for the German Wehrmacht. On November 5, 1943, a Soviet air strike destroyed half of the building, and it was rebuilt from 1951 to 1953. After that time, the headquarters of the Kyiv Military District was located there.

Since 1991, the building has housed the Ministry of Defence of Ukraine.
