= Sviatoshyn (disambiguation) =

Sviatoshyn may refer to:

- Sviatoshyn (Svyatoshino, Sviatoshyne) is a historical neighborhood and a suburb of Ukraine's capital, Kyiv.

All other objects' names are derived from the name of Sviatoshyn neighbourhood:

== Municipalities ==
- Sviatoshynskyi District is a local municipality of Kyiv City, it includes Sviatoshyn neighborhood itself.
- Kyiv-Sviatoshyn Raion (Kyievo-Sviatoshynskyi) was before 2020 a local municipality of the Kyiv Oblast, it did not include Sviatoshyn neighborhood itself.

== Transport ==
- Sviatoshyn Airfield is an industrial airfield in Kyiv, belongs to Antonov.
- Sviatoshyn railway station is a nodal passenger station of the Kyiv railway junction.
- Sviatoshyn (Kyiv Metro) is a station of Kyiv Metro's Sviatoshynsko–Brovarska line.
- Sviatoshynsko–Brovarska line is the first (red) line of the Kyiv Metro.
- Sviatoshyn Tram Depot (Sviatoshynskyi) is a former tram depot in Sviatoshyn.

== City infrastructure ==
- Sviatoshyn Square (Sviatoshynska) is a square in the Sviatoshynskyi District
- Sviatoshyn Street (Sviatoshynska) is a street in the Sviatoshynskyi District
- Sviatoshyn Lane (Sviatoshynskyi) is a lane in the Sviatoshynskyi District
- Sviatoshyn Cemetery (Sviatoshynske) is a cemetery in the Sviatoshynskyi District.

== Natural environment ==
- Sviatoshyn Forest Park (Sviatoshynskyi) is an urban forest in the Sviatoshynskyi District
- Sviatoshyn Forest Park Company (Sviatoshynske) is a community enterprise of the Kyiv City State Administration
- Sviatoshyn Forestry (Sviatoshynske) is a subdivision of Sviatoshyn Forest Park Company that manages Sviatoshyn Forest Park itself
- Sviatoshyn Ponds (Sviatoshynski) is a cascade of ponds on the Nyvka River.

== Euromaidan ==
- Sviatoshyn Night (Sviatoshynska) is a confrontation at the night on 10 to 11 January 2014 in Sviatoshyn that was a part of Euromaidan.
