= Deputatska Street, Kyiv =

Street in Kyiv, Ukraine

Deputatska Street
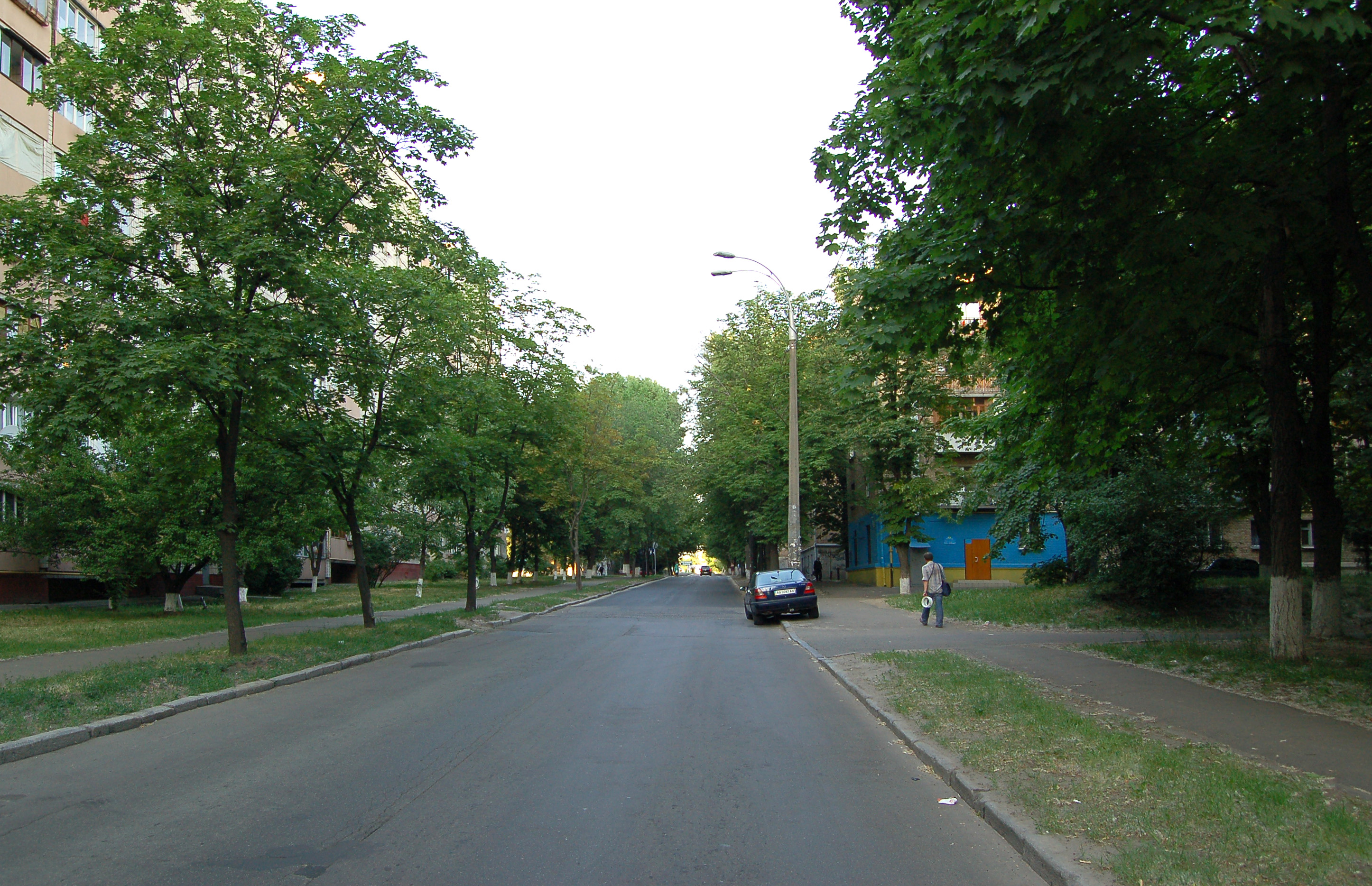
- Deputatska Street in Kyiv in 2011
- Native name: Депутатська вулиця (Ukrainian)
- Length: 1.2 km (0.75 mi)
- Location: Sviatoshynskyi District, Aviation Town, Kyiv, Ukraine
- Coordinates: 50.4588°N 30.3798°E

Deputatska Street (Ukrainian: Депутатська вулиця, romanized: Deputatska vulytsia) is a street located in Sviatoshynskyi district of the city of Kyiv, areas of Sviatoshyn, Aviamistechko. The street covers the area from Chornobaivska Square (Heroes of Brest Square until 2022, when it was renamed in honour of the 2022 Chornobaivka attacks) to Hetman Kyrylo Rozumovsky Street (named Mykola Krasnov Street 1980–2024).

It was formed some time before the Second World War, initially called 1-а Нова (First Nova), and was renamed to Deputatska Street in 1955.
