= Nikolay Krasnov =

Nikolay or Nikolai Krasnov may refer to:

- Nikolay Krasnov (soldier) (1833–1900), Imperial Russian Army general and Cossack historian
- Nikolay Krasnov (architect) (1864–1939), Russian-Serbian architect
- Nikolai Krasnov (pilot) (1914–1945), Soviet flying ace
