= Zhytomyrska =

Zhytomyrska (Ukrainian: Житомирська) is a Ukrainian name which may mean:

- Zhytomyrska (Kyiv Metro), a station on the Kyiv Metro.
- Zhytomyrska Oblast of Ukraine.
