= DIM group =

- Industry: Construction, property development
- Founded: 2014
- Headquarters: Kyiv, Ukraine
- Key people: Oleksander Nasikovskyi (founder, managing partner)
- Website: dim-bud.ua

The DIM group is a Ukrainian full-cycle development holding company founded in 2014.

== History ==
In 2007, Oleksandr Nasikovskyi founded the design and construction company ARSAN-BUD. The first objects of the company were townhouses and apartment buildings in Brovary.

In 2014, the development company DIM was founded. In May 2014, it was merged with a number of other companies under one common brand, the DIM group. The same year, the company entered the real estate market.

In 2016, the DIM group entered the real estate market of Kyiv. On June 27, 2017, the Board of Directors of the Confederation of Builders of Ukraine decided to include the DIM group of companies into the confederation, and DIM group's CEO Oleksandr Nasikovskyi became a member of the Board.

== General information ==
The holding consists of six companies. The oldest one, Olta, is windows and doors production founded in 2001. Holding also includes general contractor DIM Construction (2004), creative design studio Dim Design (2010), architecture firm The Walls (2011), real estate agency DIM Realt (2016) and managing company DIM Expert (2017). DIM group is an active member of Confederation of Builders of Ukraine. Developer's project portfolio includes more than 891,000 m^{2} of real estate in Kyiv and Kyiv Oblast. More than 60,000 m^{2} are put in operation as of end of 2018; 349,000 m2 are at the stage of implementation.

Olexander Nasikovsky – founder and managing partner of the holding, experienced entrepreneur, serves at the board of directors of Confederation of Builders of Ukraine.

In 2017, DIM group initiated a number of scientific studies on operational safety at the new construction projects, aiming at the development of environmental policy to guarantee environmental safety standards for construction and operation of residential complexes.

== Projects ==
In 2020, the developer's project portfolio included near 1 mln square meters of real estate in Kyiv and Kyiv Oblast.

=== Completed projects ===
Sobornyi, a premium-class residential complex in Brovary, Kyiv Oblast.

Family, a residential complex of comfort class in Brovary.

Autograph, a residential complex of comfort class in the Dniprovskyi district of Kyiv.

=== Under construction ===
A52", a business class residential complex in the historic center of Kyiv.

Metropolis, a comfort class residential complex in Holosiivskyi district of Kyiv.

New Autograph, a comfort class residential complex in the Holosiivskyi district of Kyiv.

A136 Highlight House, a business class residential complex in Kyiv.

LUCKY LAND, a comfort-class residential complex in the Sviatoshynskyi district of Kyiv.

Park Lake City, a business-class residential complex in the suburbs of Kyiv.

== Rewards ==
- Leader of the year 2017 award based on the results of the national business rating
- Project of the Future (Housing) EE Real Estate Awards 2019 for the club eco-complex Park Lake City.
