= Sviatoshyn =

Sviatoshyn Святошин
- Neighborhood of Kyiv
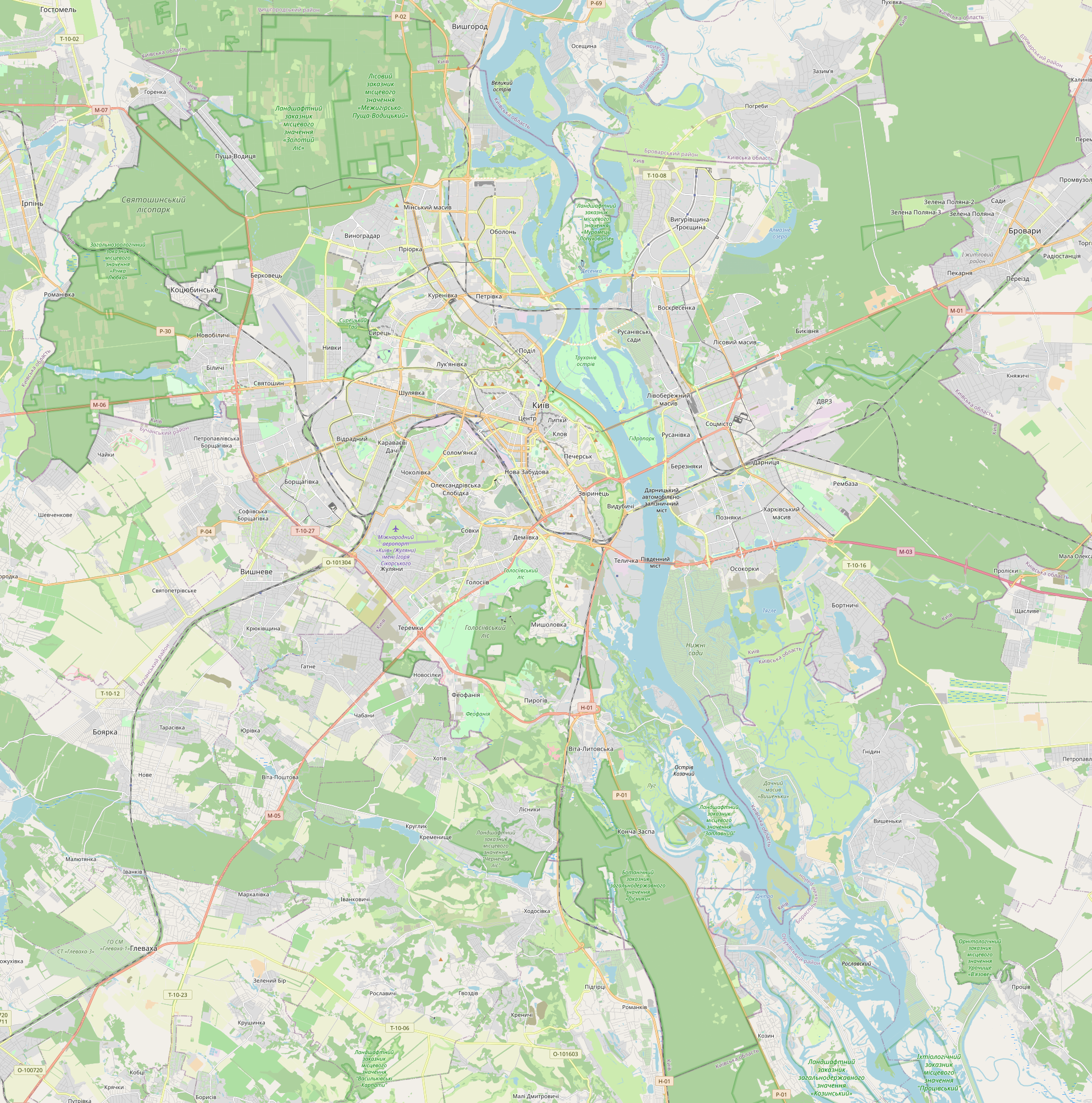
- Location within Ukraine Kyiv
- Coordinates: 50°27′25″N 30°22′21″E
- Country: Ukraine
- City: Kyiv
- Urban district: Sviatoshynskyi District
- First mentioned: 1619
- Time zone: UTC+2 (EET)
  - Summer (DST): UTC+3 (EEST)
- Postal code: 03115, 03179
- Area code: +380 44

Sviatoshyn (Ukrainian: Святошин [sʲwʲɐˈtɔʃɪn]; also Святошино or Святошине) is a historical neighborhood and a suburb of Ukraine's capital Kyiv that is located on the western edge of the city area, in an eponymous municipality.

Previously, it was a dacha village (summer colony) in a pine grove which was included in the Kyiv city council area in 1919.

== Location ==
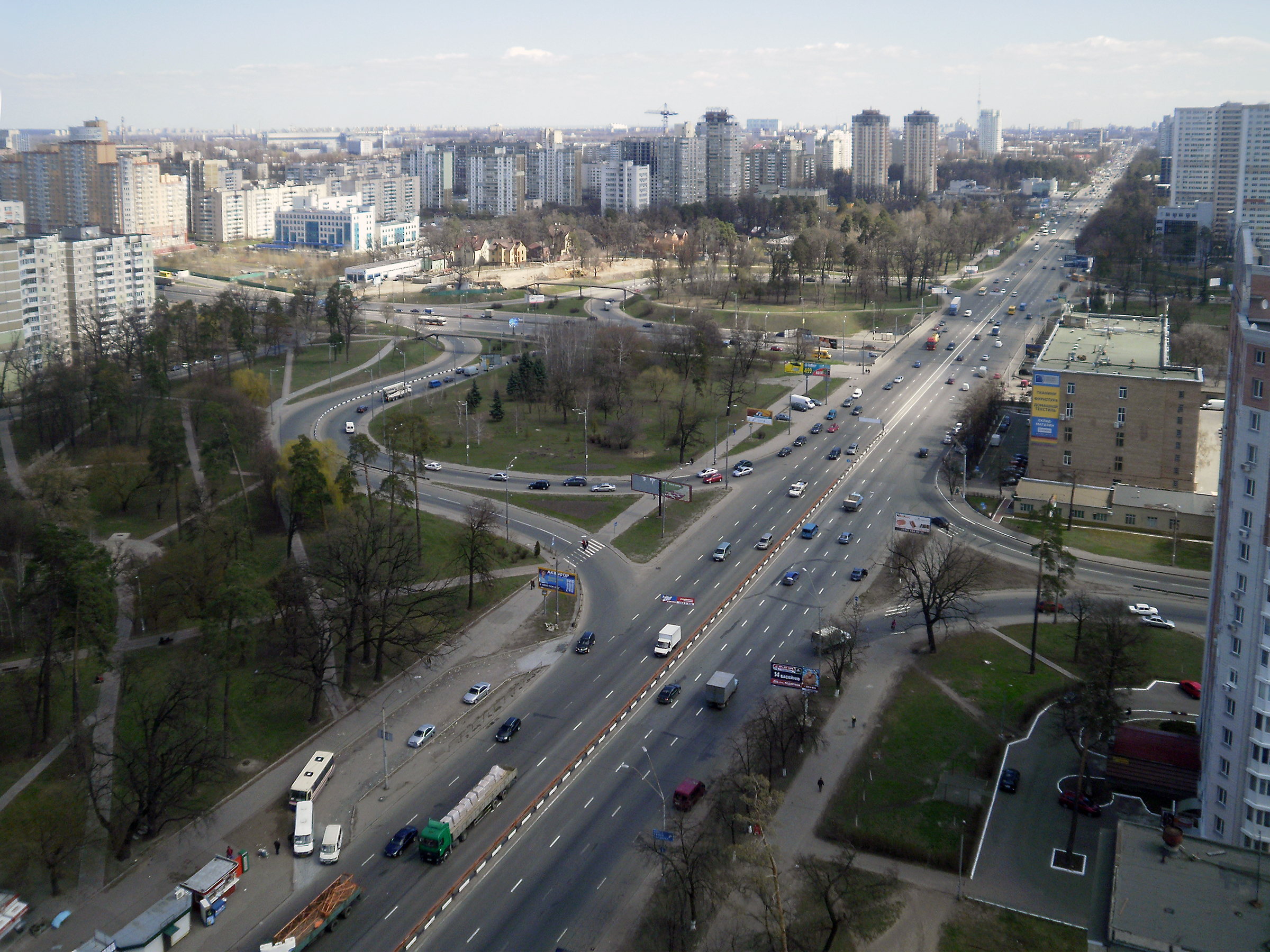
Beresteiskyi Avenue, Sviatoshyn

The neighborhood is located in the North-East of the Dnieper Upland, in the western part of Kyiv.

The suburb is situated on both sides of Kyiv's Prospect Beresteiskyi. The neighborhood borders the Nyvka River in the west. Sviatoshyn Forest Park begins on the opposite side of the river.

The east boundary of the suburb is the Kyiv–Kovel railway. The neighborhoods of Bilychi (Kyiv), Akademmistechko, and Aviamistechko are located to the north of Sviatoshyn. The neighborhoods of Mykilska and Borshchahivka as well as Skarbovyi forest and the villages of Zhovtneve and Petropavlivska Borshchahivka are located to the south.

All of Sviatoshyn's adjacent neighbourhoods and suburbs belong to the Sviatoshynskyi District with the exception of the village of Petropavlivska Borshchahivka, which is in the Bucha Raion.

By roads, the suburb is located:

- 13 km to the Kyiv city centre.
- 10 km to the city's central station - Kyiv-Pasazhyrskyi Railway Station.
- 12 km to Kyiv International Airport (Zhuliany)
- 44 km to the main city's airport, Boryspil International Airport

The core road of Sviatoshyn, Peremohy Avenue, is a part of European route E40, which is the main highway from Kyiv to other European countries. Highway T 1027 goes through the suburb from north to south, and it includes Academician Palladin Avenue and Great Ring Road.

== Name ==
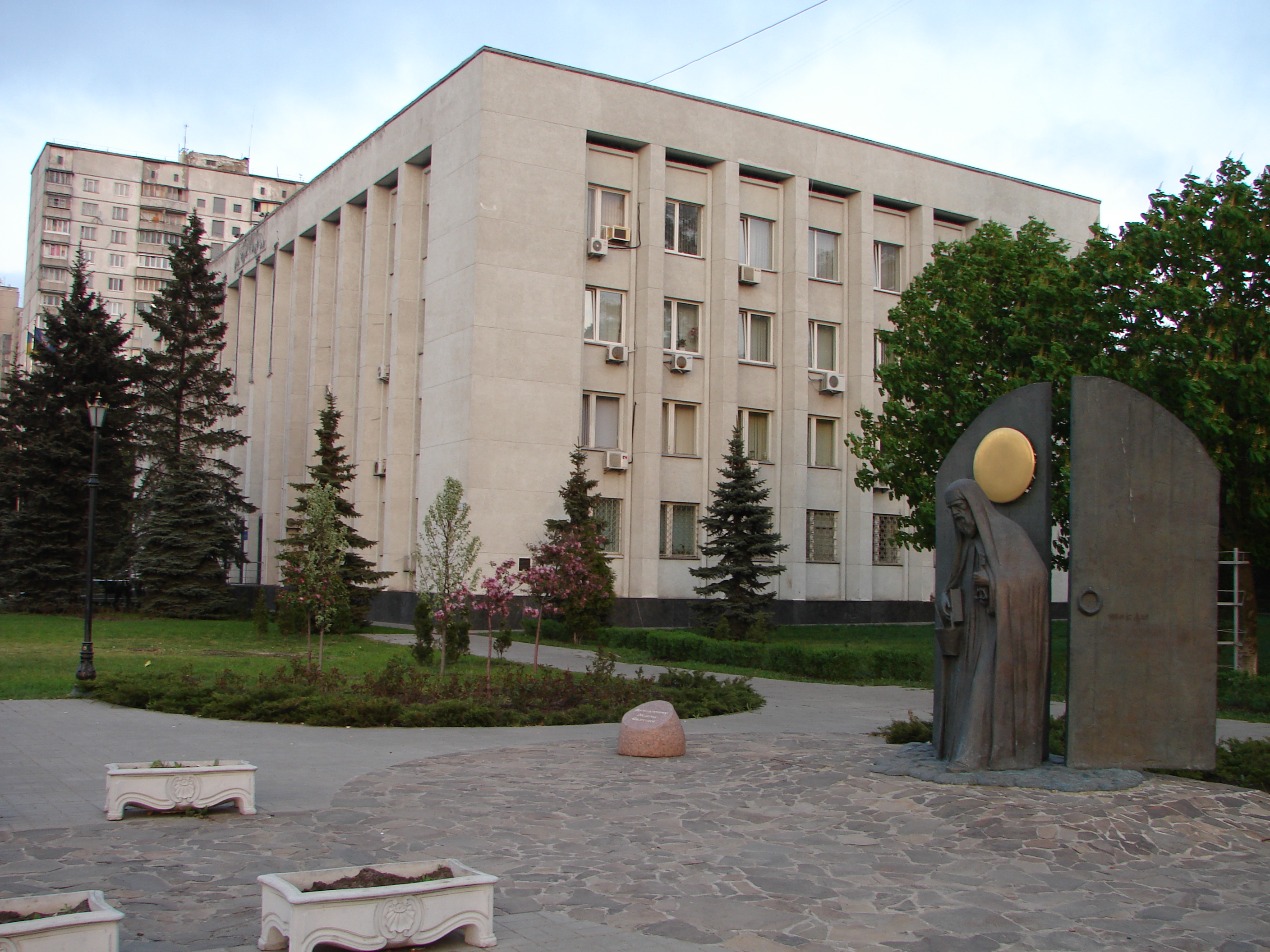
The monument of Nikola Sviatosha at the Sviatoshynskyi District council

There are two hypotheses of the name of Sviatoshyn existing.

The first one comes from a version that there was a Saint Grove (Sviatyi, Святий гай) there which was a sacred place for pagans.

The second version says that the name is derived from the nickname of Nikola Sviatosha, the Prince of Chernigov, who lived in the 12th century. His original name was Sviatoslav and he was a son of Davyd Sviatoslavich and a grandson of the Grand Prince of Kyiv Sviatoslav II. It is alleged that he owned land at neighbouring Borshchahivka. In 1106 he donated all his property to the Kyiv Pechersk Lavra and became one of its monks. He took the monk Christian name Nikola (Nikolai, Ukrainian: Микола, romanized: Mykola). Since he was very devout, he was given the informal nickname Sviatosha, which means a pious, godly religious person.

In itself, the Ukrainian word "Sviatoshyn" means "Sviatosha's", that is, something that belongs to Sviatosha.

=== Spelling ===
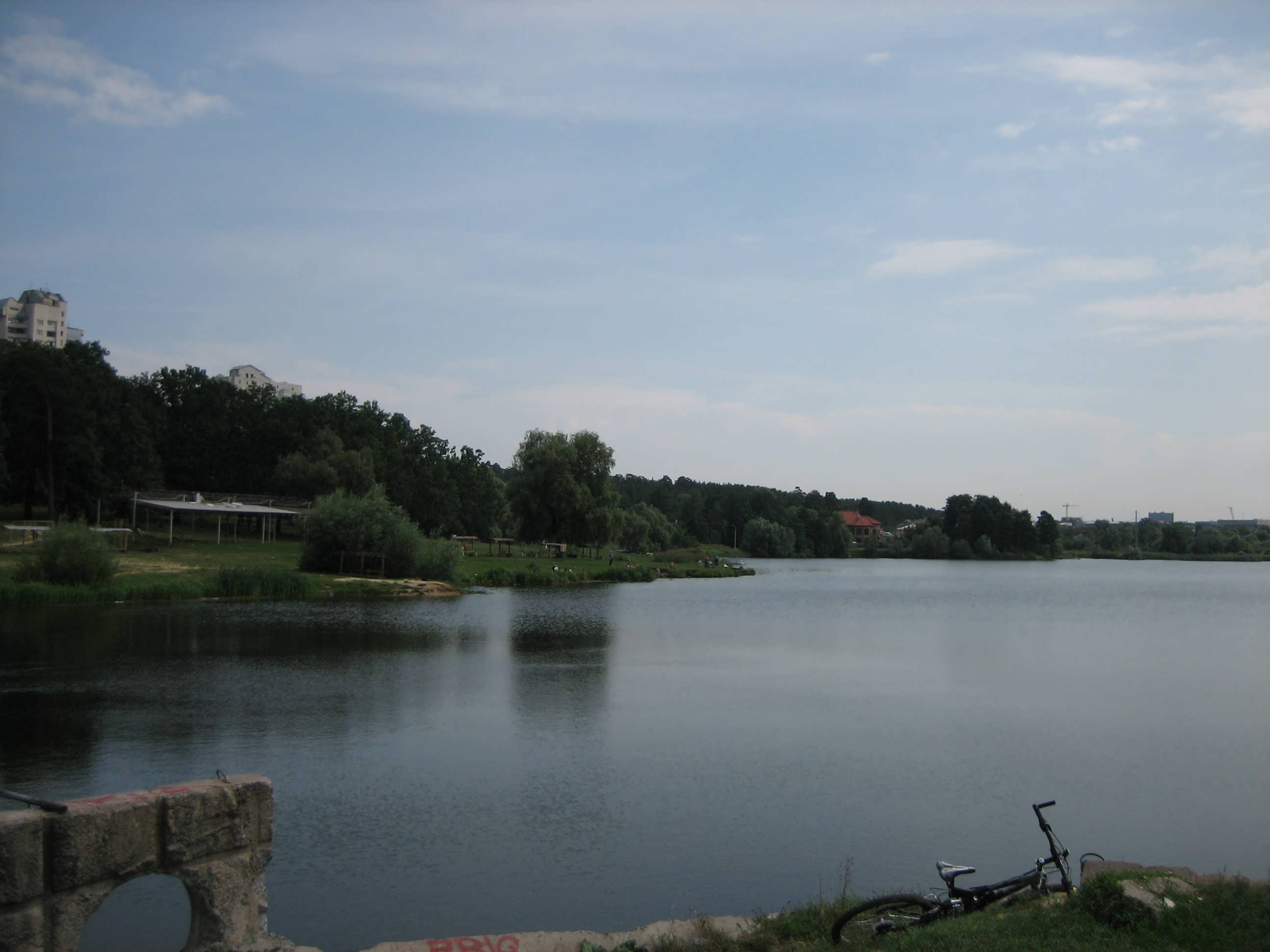
Sviatoshyn Pond

The ethnographer Lavrentii Pokhylevych in his work "Tales of inhabited areas of the Kyiv province" mentioned this place as "a woodland called Sviatoshyn" in 1884. There is also a document called "The report of the Committee to facilitate accomplishment of the villa area in the locality Sviatoshyn of the Kyiv province and district. Kyiv, 1903". At the beginning of the 20th century, the village was called Sviatoshyn (Святошинъ in the Pre-reform Russian orthography).

In the Soviet era there was a trend to change names of settlements, especially small ones, by putting the suffix "-o". Since the 1930s on all maps of Kyiv in both Russian and Ukrainian, the suburb was marked as Sviatoshyno (Святошино). Settlement names with the suffix "-o" are more typical of Russian language than Ukrainian, so sometimes the name Sviatoshyne (Святошине) was used in Ukrainian spelling despite there being a Sviatoshyn (Святошин) article included in Kyiv (Encyclopedic reference book) that was published by the Ukrainian Soviet Encyclopedia editorial office.

Since the station of the Kyiv Metro, which is the suburb's landmark, was renamed Sviatoshyn (Святошин) station, this variant of suburb spelling has been broadly used. Ukrainian linguists insist on using Sviatoshyn (Святошин) as the locality name. In spite of this, sometimes the name Sviatoshyno (Святошино) has still been used, even in official documents of the Kyiv City Council.

== History ==
=== Early history ===
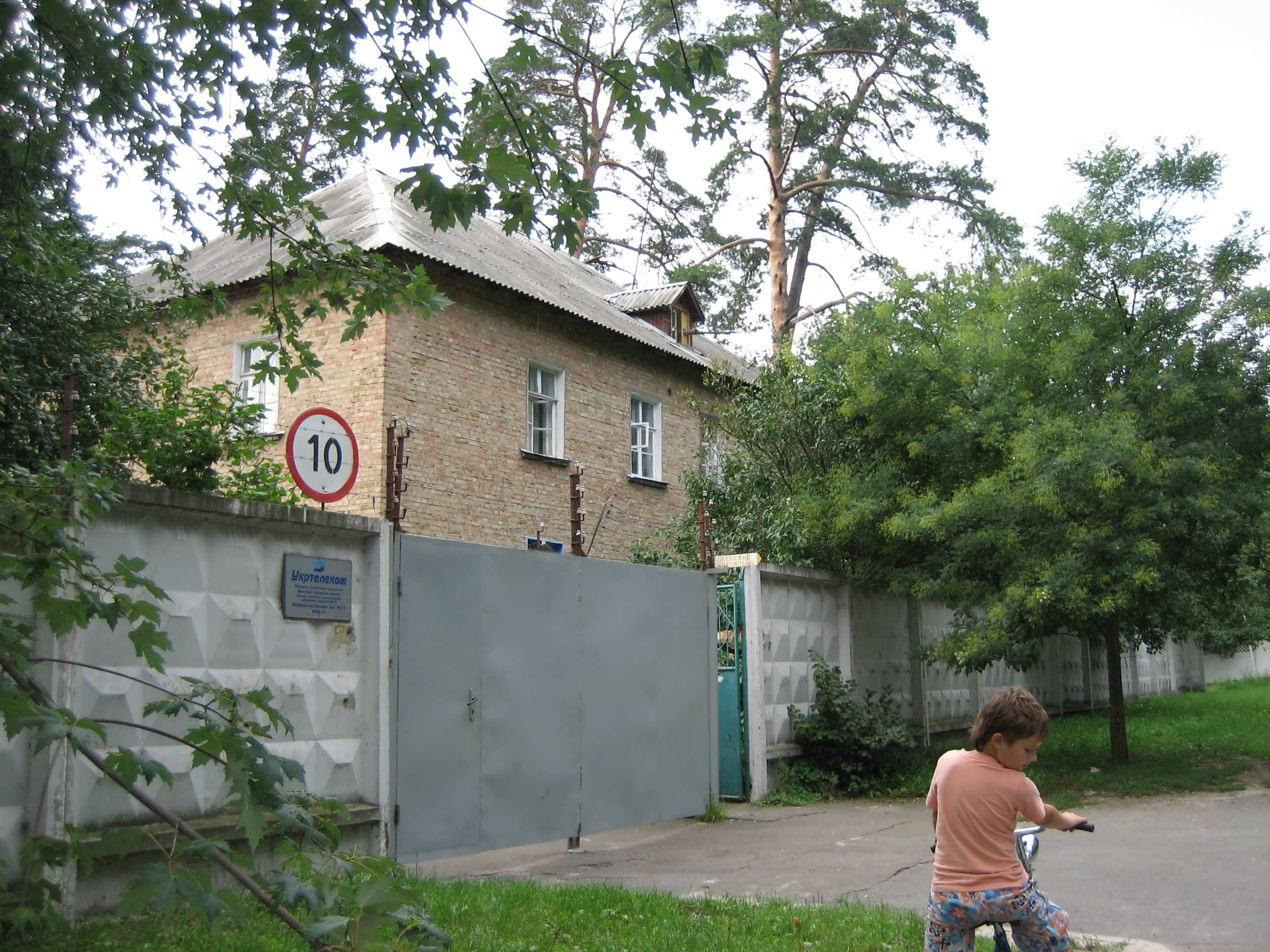
Zhyvopysna Street, a former name - the 5th prosika (cutting glade)

Before the Kievan Rus', Sviatoshyn was a territory of Eastern Polans.

At the time of the Kievan Rus' and the Grand Duchy of Lithuania, the land belonged to the Principality of Kiev.

It is alleged that in the 12th century the owner of this land was Nikola Sviatosha (Sviatoslav), the Prince of Chernigov, who donated it to the Kyiv Pechersk Lavra. Until the beginning of the 17th century, this area belonged to Kyiv's monasteries.

The first mention of the area name Sviatoshyn was in 1619, when this land was a part of the Kyiv Voivodeship of the Crown of the Kingdom of Poland of the Polish–Lithuanian Commonwealth. At that time, the king, Sigismund III Vasa, determined the metes and bounds of Kyiv's land possession in his charter. In particular, it was said that Kyiv's boundary went "through an oak grove to Sviatoshyn side".

At the time of the Cossack Hetmanate, the territory belonged to the Kyiv Regiment (Cossack Hetmanate).

In the 1780s, this land was included in the Kyiv Viceroyalty of the Russian Empire. The Magdeburg rights of Kyiv were revoked, so Sviatoshyn was under state ownership.

=== Dacha village ===
In 1897, Sviatoshyn, which had been occupied by a pine grove, was divided into 450 lots and leased for 99 years. Soon afterwards, а dacha village (summer colony) was set up there.

A grid plan was implemented in the village, which is typical of dacha summer settlements. The core road of Sviatoshyn was Brest-Litovsky highway, now Peremohy Avenue.

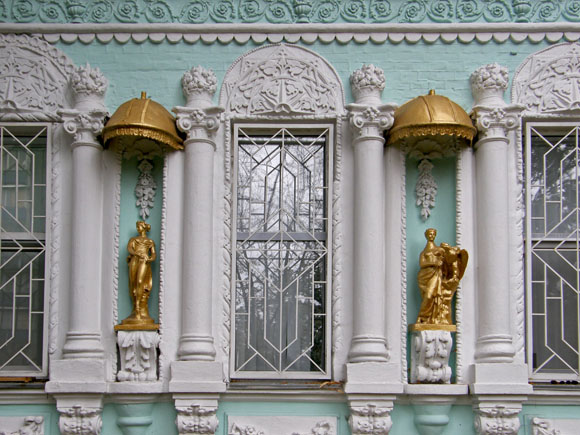
The former dacha villa of I. Diakov Kyiv mayor (1906–1916, 1918)

The villa projects were created by the architects Alexander Krivosheiev and Alexander Khoinatsky. A lot of powerful, influential and rich people had villas there. In particular, Kyiv University professors, three Kyiv mayors, and businessmen (including members of the "sugar magnate" Tereshchenko family) owned villas in the area.

The popularity of the villa area was high because of a pine grove, a pond, and a good transport infrastructure. In 1898, a narrow-gauge railway was laid from Kyiv. It was originally used as a horsecar tram line, but later steam tram-cars would also operate there. In 1901, the village was connected to an electricity network, and electric trams were launched on 1 May of that year. In 1902, the Kyiv-Kovel railway, which goes along the east edge of Sviatoshyn, was finished, and the Sviatoshyn Railway Station was opened.

In 1911, one of Kyiv's oldest movie theatres, Ekran, was opened at the corner of Brest-Litovsky Highway and the 3rd Prosika.

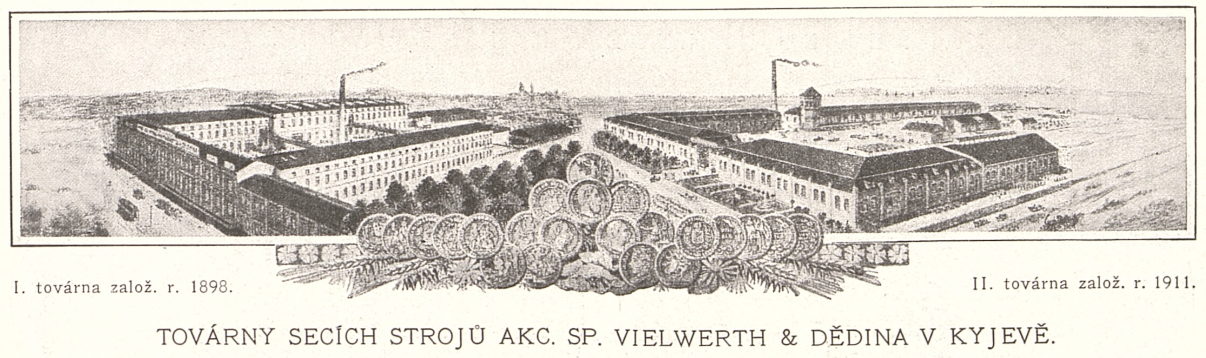
Machine factories of the Russo-Czech joint-stock company Filvert & Dedina.

In 1911, the Filvert and Dedina factory was opened beside the railway station, for the production of agricultural machinery.

Between the village and Syrets was Sviatoshyn Airfield, where the pilot Pyotr Nesterov introduced his famous aerobatics flights.

In 1919, the village was included into the Kyiv City Council area.

==== Gallery ====
Old villas

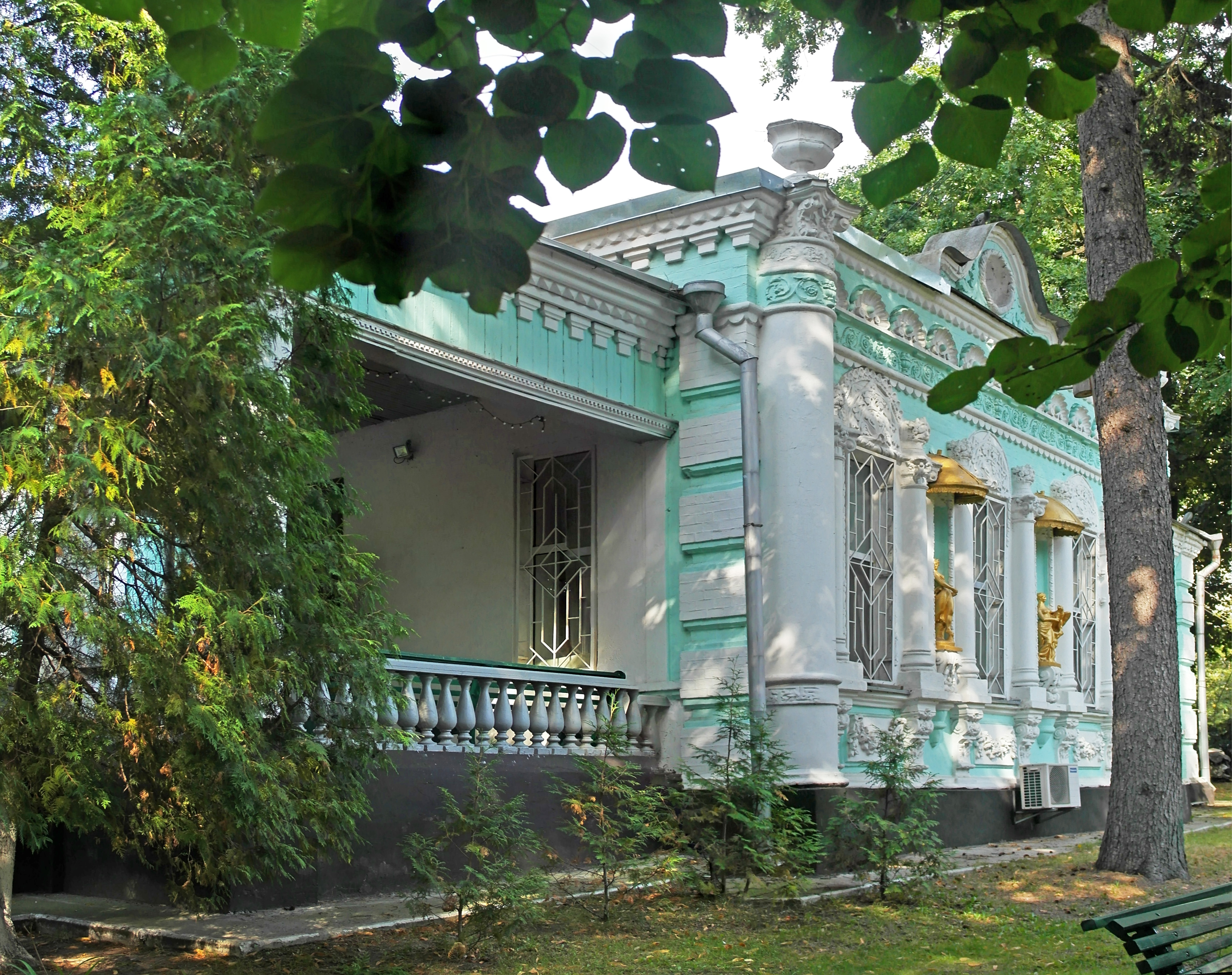

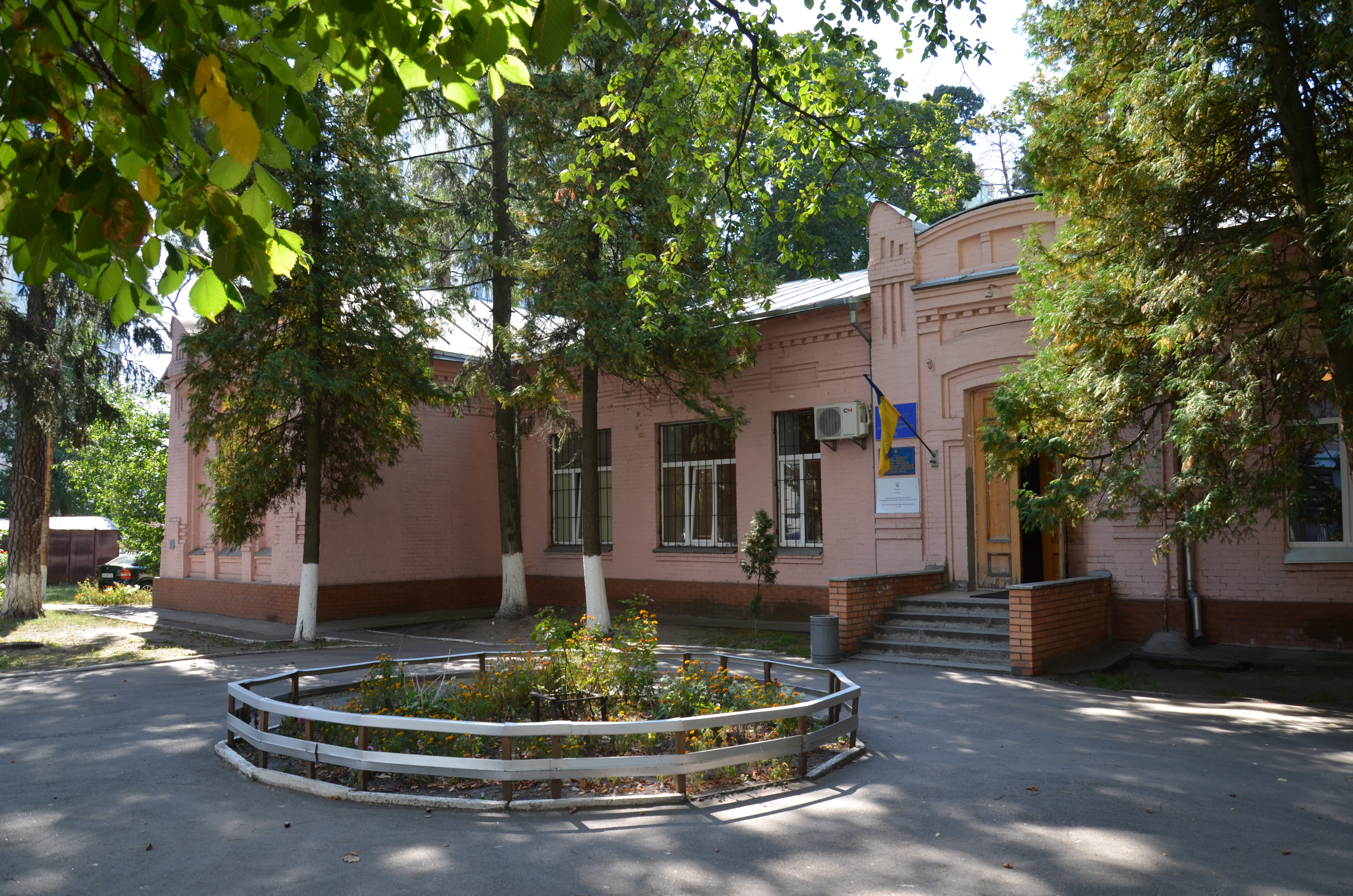

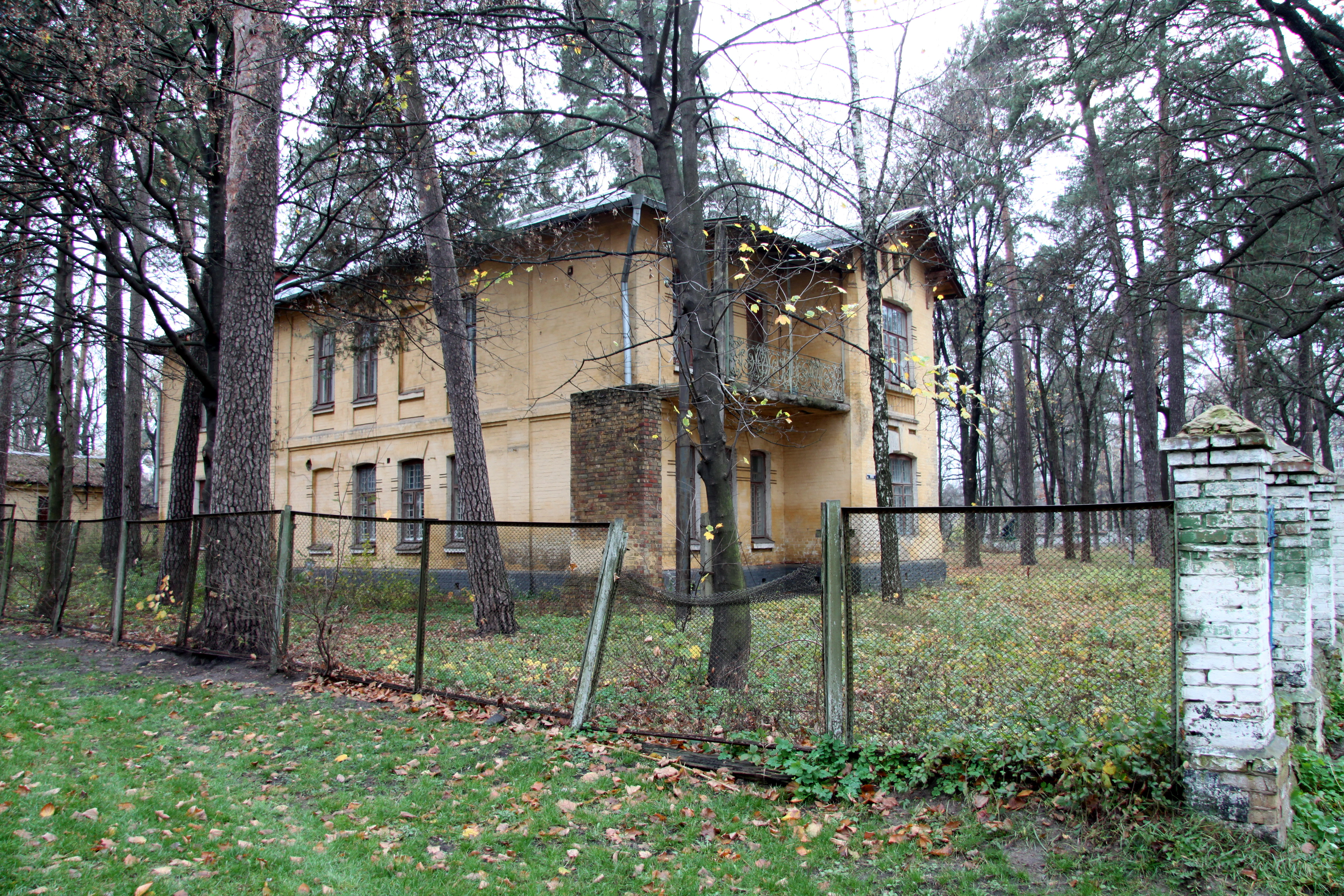

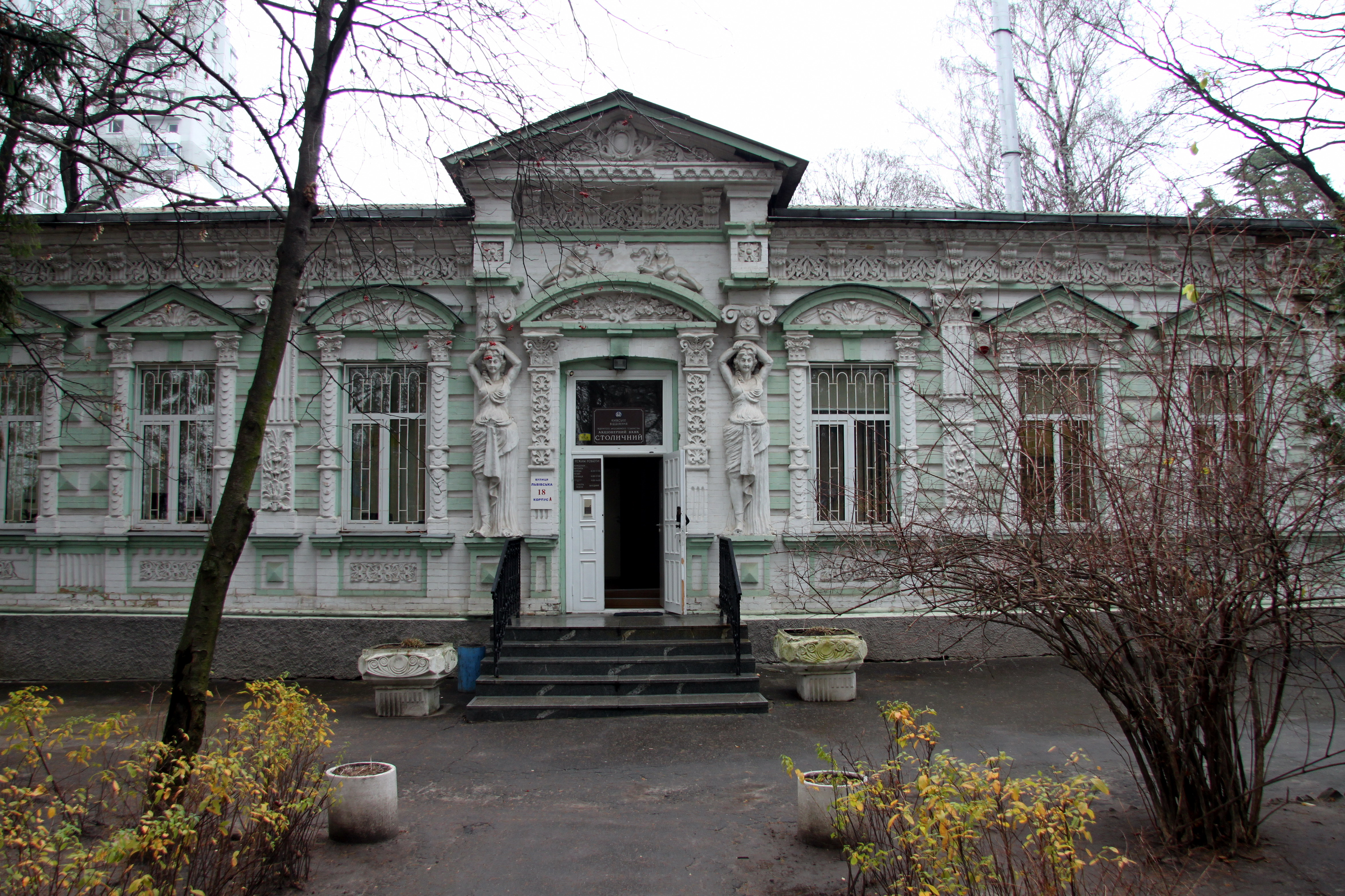

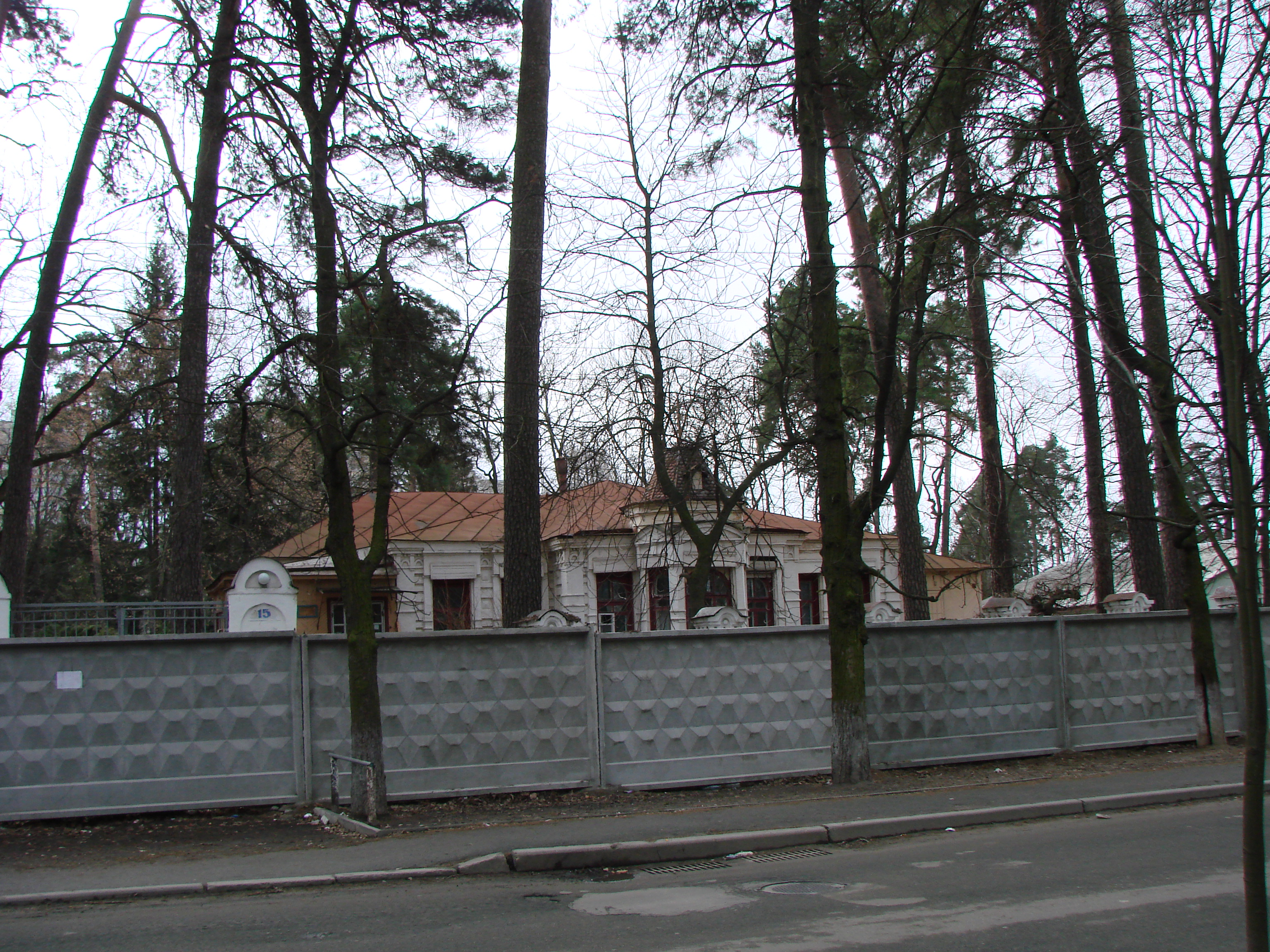

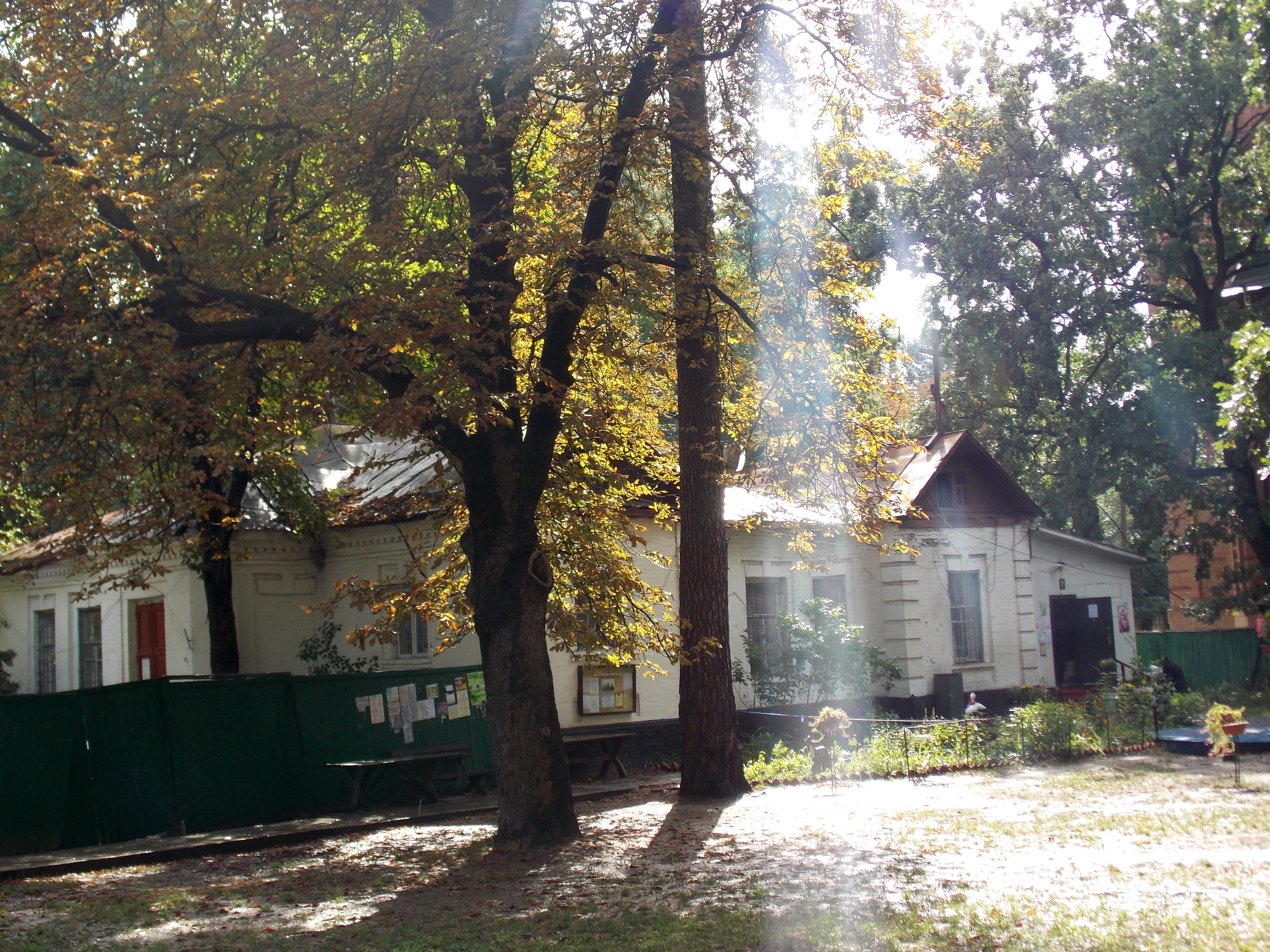

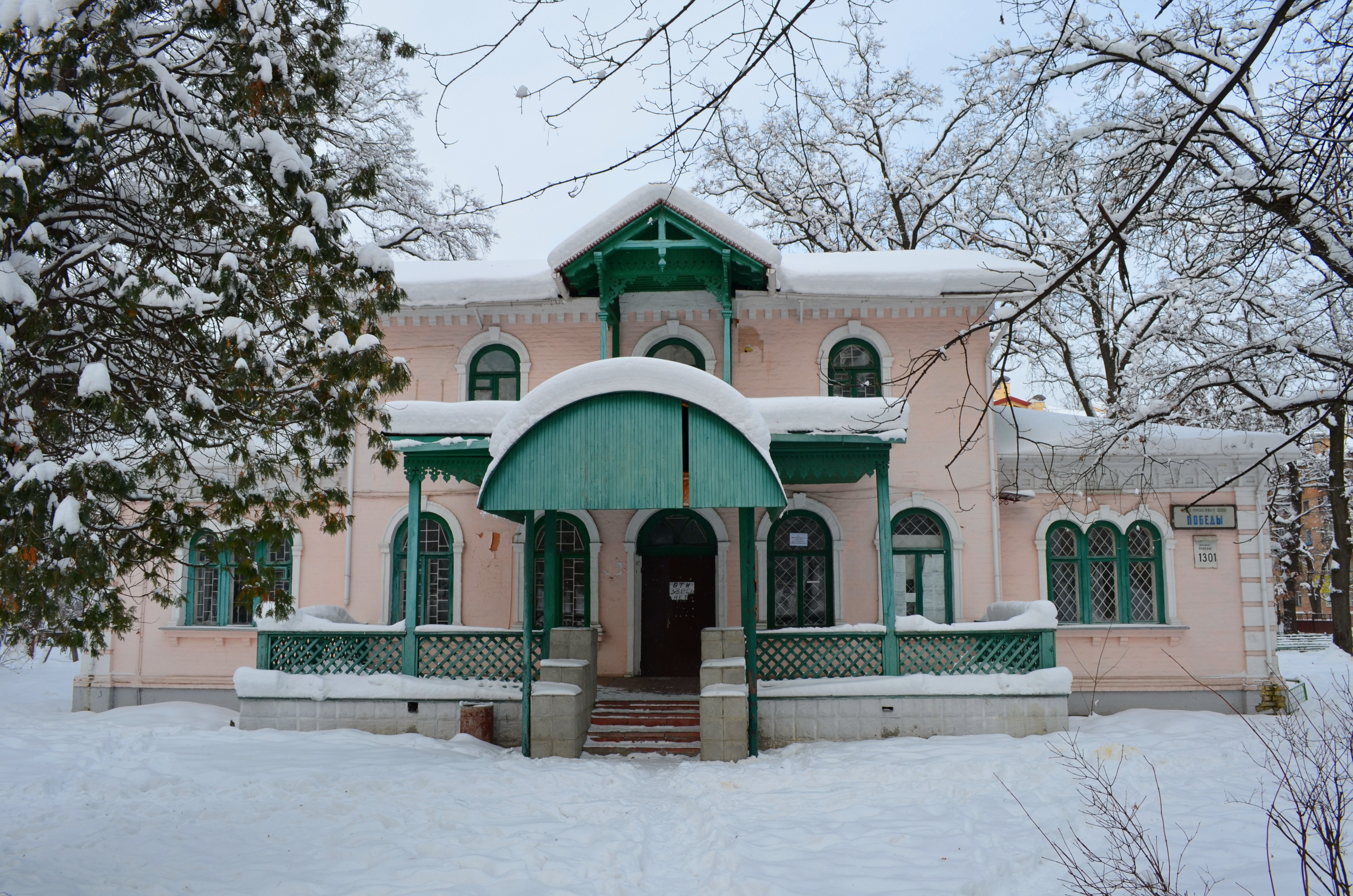

=== Soviet era ===
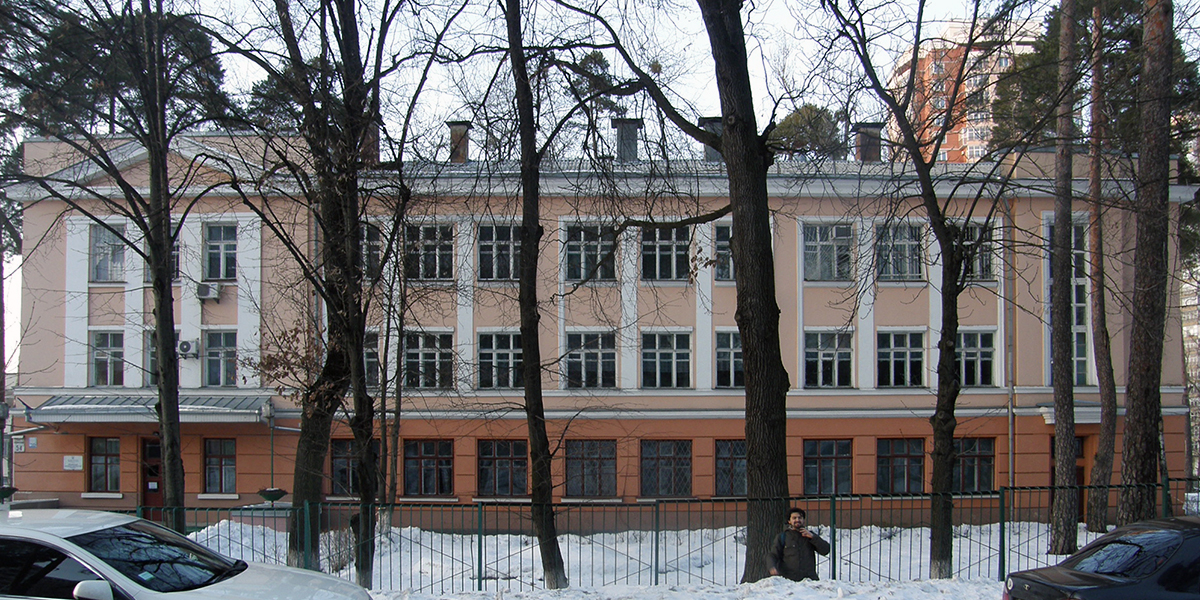
The former military hospital, 1938, an example of Stalinist architecture

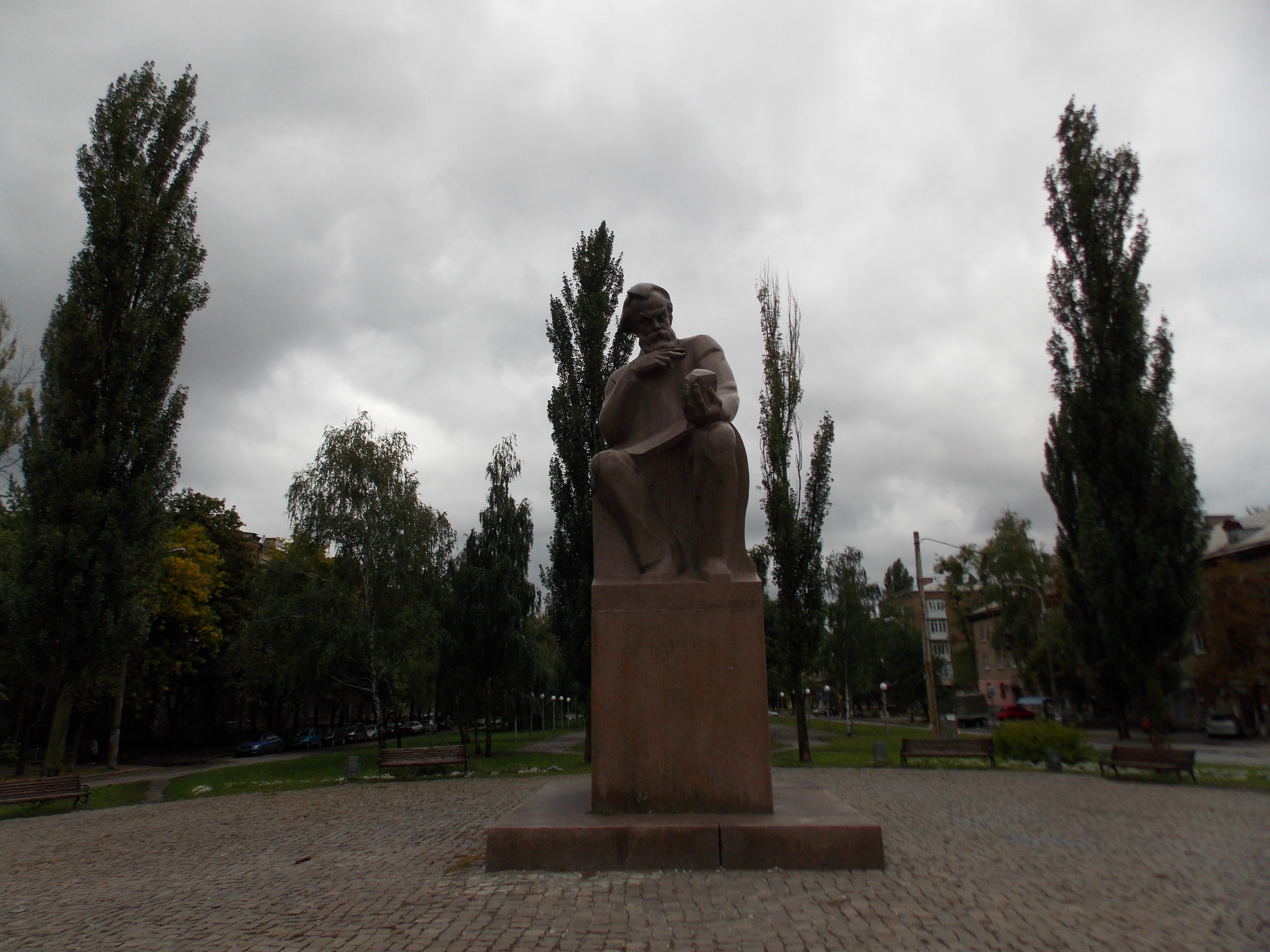
The monument of the academician Vernadsky, 1981, at the intersection of Peremohy Avenue and Academician Vernadsky Boulevard

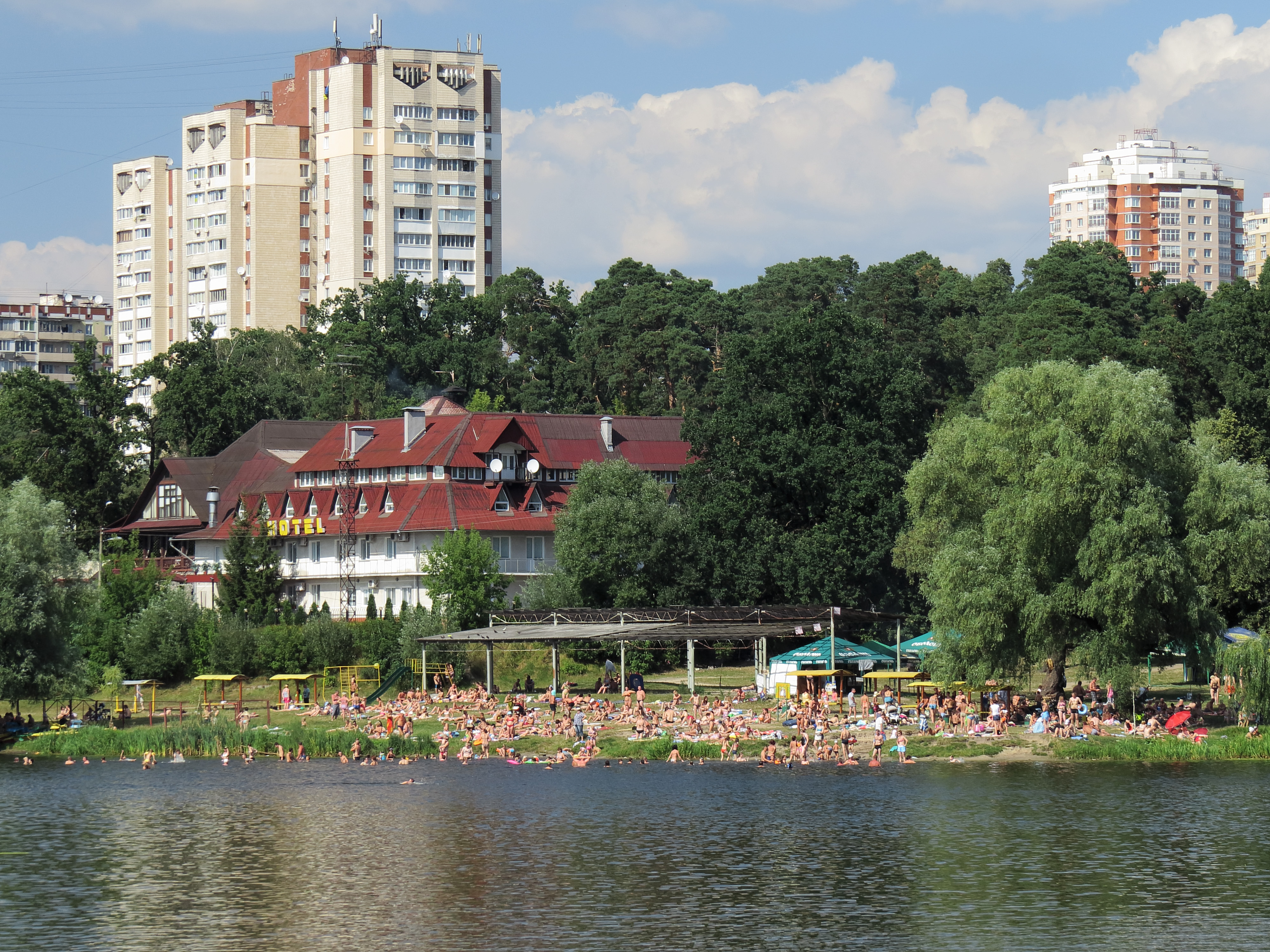
The hotel and restaurant Verkhovyna at Sviatoshyn Pond, 2014

As a result of the Ukrainian–Soviet War (1917–1921) and the Polish–Soviet War (1919–1921), Kyiv and its suburbs were captured by the Red Army. In 1921, the Bolsheviks conducted an administrative subdivision reform and Kyiv was divided into 5 raions (districts). Sviatoshyn was included into the City Council area permanently.

The Bolshevik government conducted the nationalisation policy so that many dacha villas would be expropriated. The best villas were transferred to the state and became trade union sanatoriums, boarding schools and Young Pioneer camps. Other villas and cottages were converted to communal apartments.

In the 1930s, Sviatoshyn's St. Nicholas Eastern Orthodox church was demolished. However, on the south-west edge of Sviatoshyn, the Roman Catholic parish of the Exaltation of the Holy Cross remained intact while under Communist rule and became the only refuge for Roman Catholics in the Kyiv region.

In 1941, during the Second World War, the general staff of the Kyiv Fortified Region was situated in present-day Kyiv secondary school No. 140. There is a complex of monuments located near Soviet soldiers' graves who were killed in the Battle of Kyiv in 1943 at the Sviatoshyn Cemetery.

At the end of the 1940s, the ownership of Sviatoshyn Airfield was passed over to an aircraft serial production plant that since 1952 has been headquarters of the state-owned Antonovcompany. In 1988, the company produced the largest aircraft in the world, the Antonov An-225 Mriya. Together with the aircraft factory, a new development named Aviamistechko (Aviation town in Ukrainian) began being built next to the north-east edge of Sviatoshyn. This locality is also known as Novosviatoshyn (New Sviatoshyn).

In 1947 the clothing factory Kashtan ("Chestnut") was launched; it was one of the biggest producer of male shirts in the USSR.

In the late 1950s, the new housing estate Akademmistechko was built north of Sviatoshyn. Besides residential buildings, there have been numerous research institutes belonging to the Ukrainian Academy of Sciences located in the town. Therefore, the suburb got the name Akademmistechko (Ukrainian: Академістечко, lit. 'Academic town').

In 1971, the Sviatoshyn station of the Kyiv Metro opened on the eastern edge of neighbourhood.

In 1982, due to the increasing traffic on Brest-Litovsky Highway, the Sviatoshyn tram line was dismantled. To replace the trams, trolleybuses were launched in the neighbourhood.

== Memorial to Chernobyl disaster victims ==
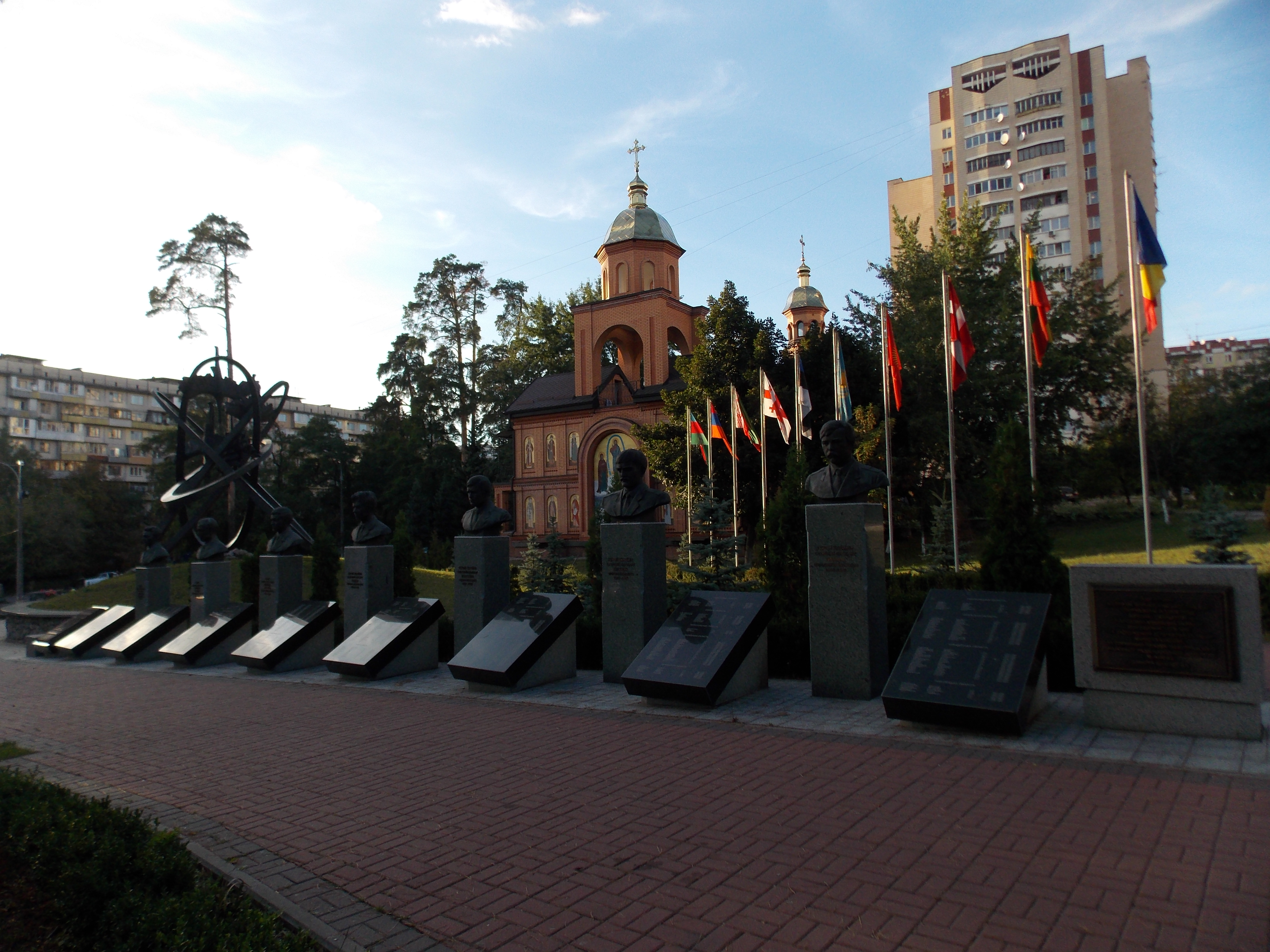
Memorial to victims of the Chernobyl tragedy

The memorial to Chernobyl disaster victims is located in a landscape park at the intersection of Chornobylska Street and Peremohy Avenue. The memorial is devoted to people who were killed or injured as a result of the Chernobyl disaster in 1986.

The monument to victims of that tragedy was erected at the initiative of the Chernobyl Disabled Union on 26 April 1994, with funds of the local budget and private donations. The monument was made by sculptor Volodymyr Chepelyk and architect Mykola Kyslyi.

In 2001, the St Theodosius of Chernihiv church and in 2002 the bell tower museum were built at the monument.

In 2011, the memorial avenue "Heroes of Chernobyl" was created at the initiative of "Chernobyl Fire-fighters" NGO. There were erected seven busts of firemen, heroes of Ukraine and the Soviet Union and installed eight memorial plates in memory of died Chernobyl disaster liquidators.

== Vasyl Stus Garden Square ==
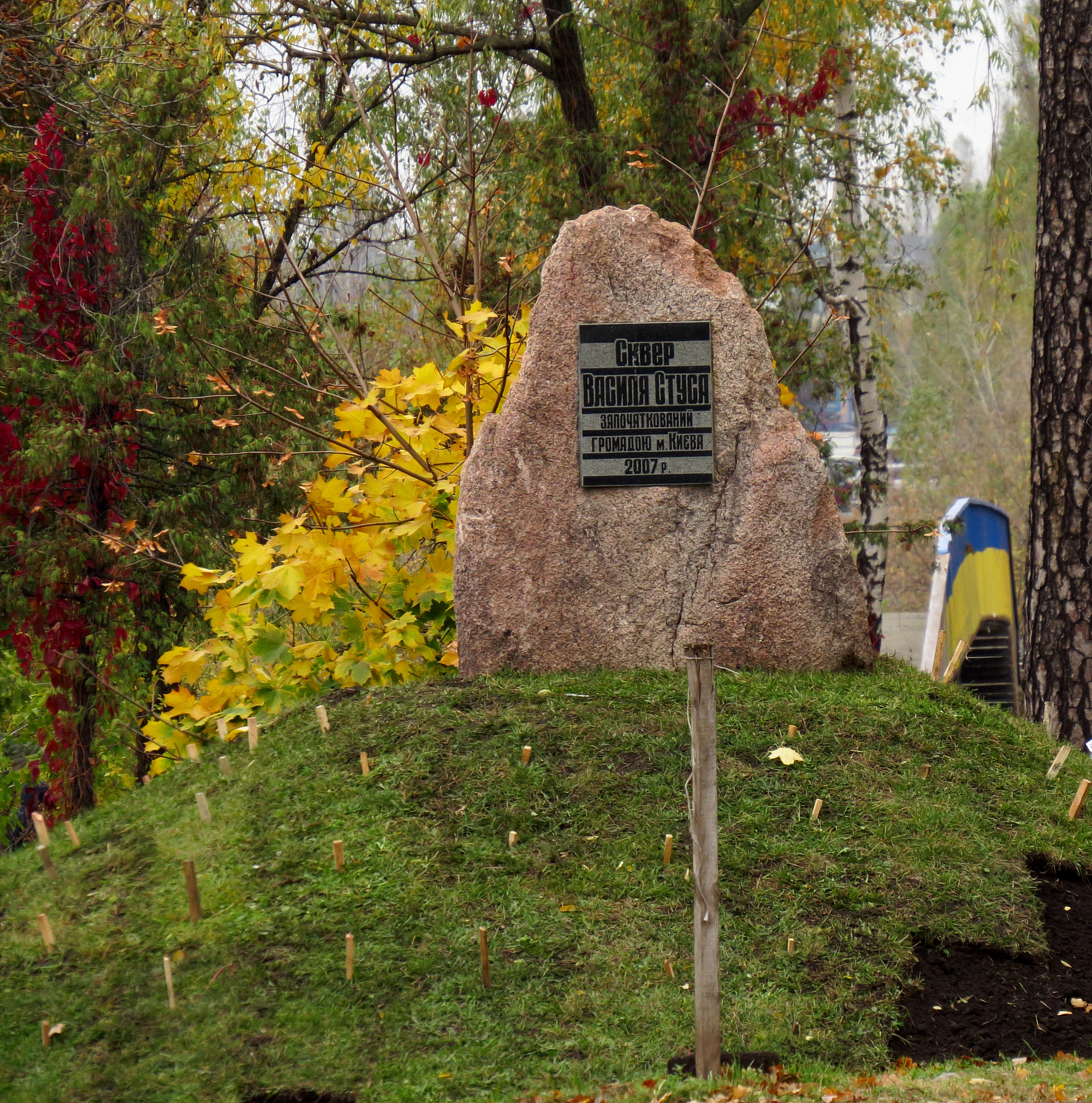
Vasyl Stus Garden Square

Vasyl Stus Garden Square is located at the corner of Academician Palladin Avenue and Peremohy Avenue. It is named after the poet and political prisoner Vasyl Stus, who was one of the most significant members of the Ukrainian cultural movement of the sixtiers. He was living close by at 62 Lvivska Street from his marriage in 1965 to his first arrest in 1972. The house was demolished in 1979 due to a road interchange being built there.

In 2006, at the initiative of the Ukrainian People's Party and Green World, Vasyl Stus garden square was built. The initiative coordinator was Viktor Tkachenko. However, in 2008, the Kyiv City State Administration gave a building permit for the construction of a shopping centre there. The building developer cut down more than 100 trees, including oaks older than 120 years and pines older than 150 years. Litigations began between both parties.

In 2010, the Kyiv City Council assigned the name Vasyl Stus to the plot. The garden square was opened on Kyiv Day 2015 by the mayor of Kyiv Vitali Klitschko. Vasyl Stus's widow, sister, granddaughter, friends, public activists, and local community residents attended the ceremony.

== Transport ==
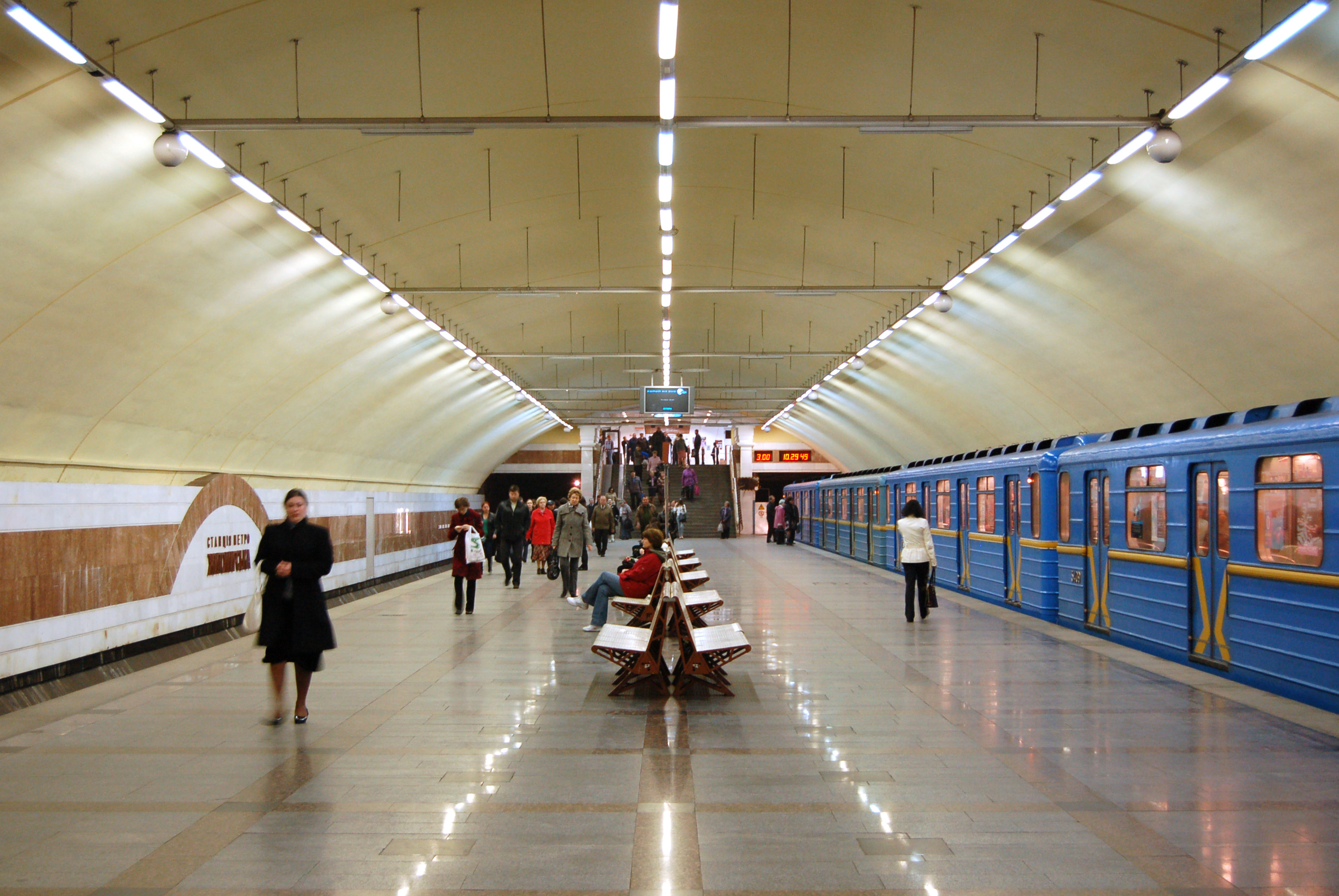
Zhytomyrska metro station

All electric multiple unit trains go through Sviatoshyn Railway Station when traveling from Kyiv northwest. Some passenger trains that are traveling to Western Ukraine stop at the station as well.

The bus station Dachna is located at 142a Peremohy Avenue.

The Sviatoshynsko-Brovarska Line of the Kyiv Metro is laid underground. Zhytomyrska metro station, which opened on 24 May 2003, is situated in the centre of Sviatoshyn.

The suburb is connected to other neighborhoods by Kyiv's municipal buses and trolleybuses.
