= Borshchahivka =

Neighborhood located to the west and south-west of Kyiv

Coordinates: 50°25′35″N 30°22′25″E

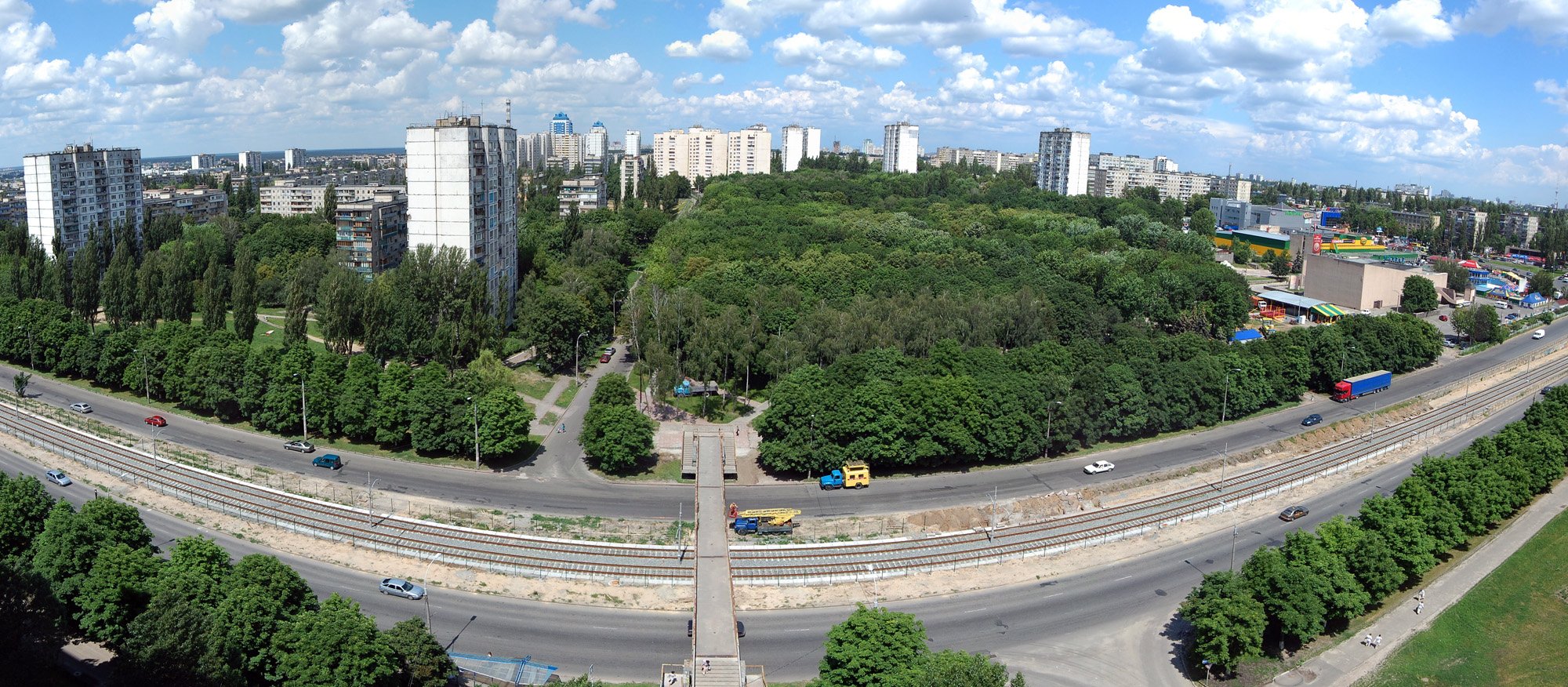
Panoramic view of the neighborhood

Borshchahivka (Ukrainian: Борщагівка, Russian: Борщаговка) is a neighborhood located in the west and south-west of Kyiv, the capital of Ukraine. It is part of the city's Sviatoshynskyi District and suburban Bucha Raion. The eponymous Borshchahivka River flows through the neighborhood.

The neighborhood is named after a large village that was founded at the site. The contemporary urban look comes from the 1960s and 1970s. The neighborhood is divided into four sections: Mykilska, Mykhailivska, Bratska, and Pivdenna (South) Borshchahivka. The first three are former villages incorporated into Kyiv, while the last section was built in 1980s in place of northern Bratska Borshchahivka. Two villages named Petropavlivska Borshchahivka and Sofiivska Borshchahivka also exist nearby, but they do not belong to Kyiv.

A light rail line connects Borshchahivka with Kyiv's central railway station.

== History ==
The settlement was first mentioned in 1497. The name, according to one version, comes from the herb hogweed (борщівник). Borschahivka consisted of several villages that belonged to Kyiv monasteries. From each of them, these villages acquired their corresponding name. On Guillaume de Beauplan's General map of Ukraine in 1648, it is listed as Borsciowka and is located within the Kyiv Voivodeship of the Polish-Lithuanian Commonwealth to the west of Kyiv, on the right bank of the Repyn River and the northern edge of the Bilogrud Forest.

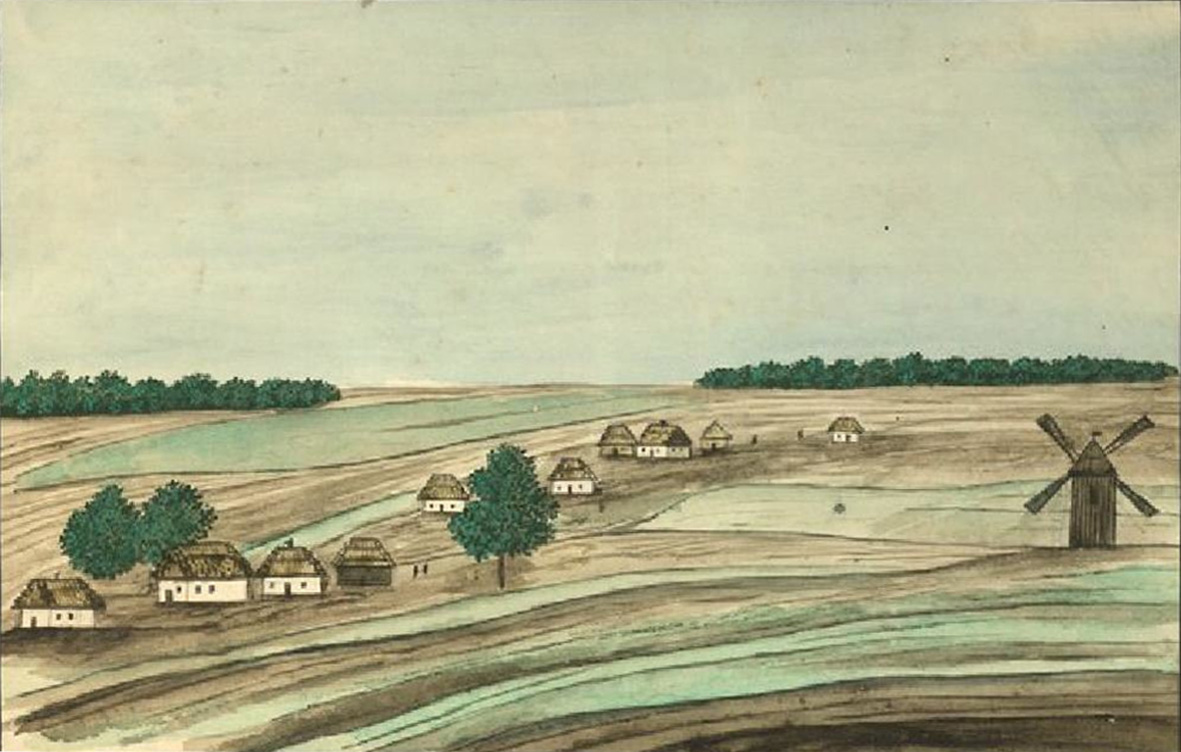
Mykilska Borshchahivka by Dominique de la Flise, 1854

In Polish Geographic Dictionary (Slownik geograficzny), there is a mention of a locality named Borzakowszczyzna near Pyrohiv (Pirogow), which at the time was a property of Kyiv Pechersk Lavra. The locality was named after the monastic scribe Vasyl Borzakiv. At the same time, the dictionary has another term "Borszczhowka" which is described as an old urban place from the old princely Ruthenia belonging to Witold Svidrigiello and later the House of Olelkovych. This Borszczahowka is stretching from the mouth of river Horohuvatka towards Ros River, on the administrative border between the counties of Skvyra and Tarashcha.

In the description of 1686, most of the villages by the name of Borshchahivka, are mentioned as "empty villages", probably devastated after the wars in Ukraine in the 2nd half of the 17th century. At the beginning 18th century there were only 22 households in all of Borshchahivka. The population was mainly engaged in horticulture, to a lesser extent in agriculture, sowing rye, oats, millet and breeding small livestock. There were no industries. After the secularization of church lands in 1786, the settlements and its peasants became the property of the state. After the abolition of serfdom in the Russian Empire the population grew rapidly. In 1787, there were 558 inhabitants, in 1885 - 2,223, in 1890 - 3,512, in 1896 - 4,218 and in 1913 - 5,702.

During the Ukrainian War of Independence, in 1918-1919 Borshchahivka was a site of numerous battles over control of Kyiv, fought by Ukrainian army and rebel forces against the Bolsheviks, Hetmanate and the Russian Volunteer Army. In 1932, there were 1,242 households and 6,719 inhabitants, five agricultural and dairy state farms. During the famine of 1932-1933, up to 1,000 people died in Borshchahivka and Bilychi.

=== Urbanization ===
The villages of Mykilska, Bratska and Mykhailivska Borshchahivka were officially included within the city limits on 30 August 1971.

In the early 1960s, the Kyivproject Institute developed a number of projects of new residential estates in Kyiv, the largest of which was Mykilska Borshchahivka. It was planned to build 890 thousand sq.m. of housing for 100 thousand people. For the first time in Kyiv, an area with such a large population was planned, with newspapers comparing it to a medium-sized city. The initial plans called for the construction of eight microdistricts within the neighborhood, a large community center with a park, pedestrian zone, theater, stadium, and shopping centers was planned. Later, the number of microdistricts was increased to 12. The construction of a residential area on the site of the village took place in 1966-1977.

According to the plans of 1962-1963, it was planned to extend the metro line after the Bolshevik station here, a suburban railway station was also planned to be built at the site of the contemporary Borshchahivka railway platform. Starting in 1965, the extension of the metro line was being planned towards Svyatoshyn instead, where the Akademmistechko would soon be built. Instead of the metro, a light rail line was built to Borshchahivka, which would be put into operation in 1978.

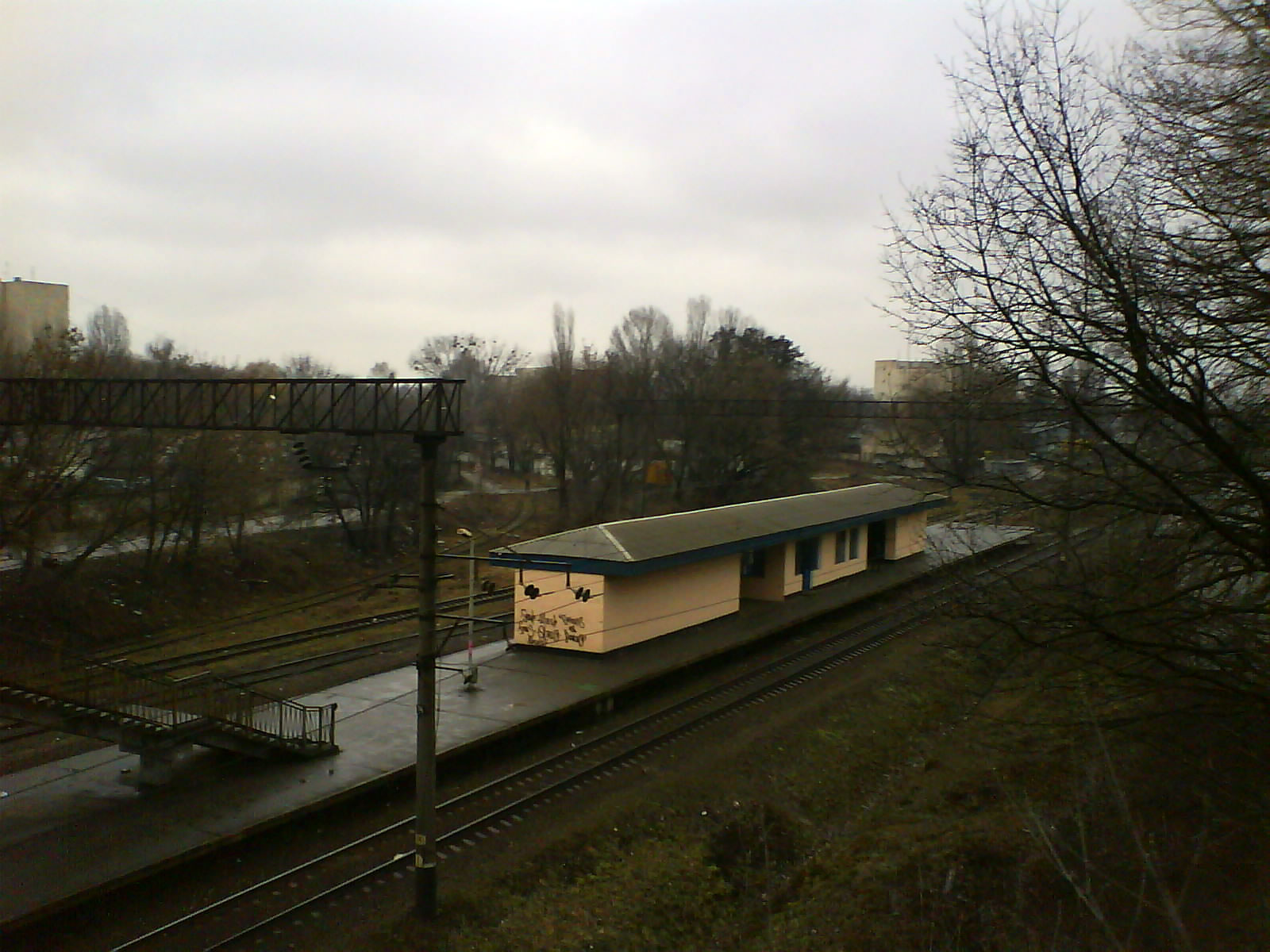
Borshchahivka station, which serves Kyiv Urban Electric Train and suburban trains

Construction of the estate began in 1966, when the area was still outside the city limits at the time. From 1967 to 1972, approximately 180 residential buildings were completed here, with almost 40 houses built per year for three consecutive years, from 1968 to 1970: 19 in 1967, 37 in 1968, 38 in 1969, 38 in 1970, 30 in 1971, and 17 in 1972. Since the early 1970s, 5-story buildings in the development have been replaced by 9-story buildings. The last of the Mykilska Borshchahivka microdistricts to be built was No. 2, bounded by Yakuba Kolasa, Kiprianova, Heroiv Kosmosu, and Zhmerynska streets. Its construction, which included only 9-story and 16-story buildings, took place in 1984-1987.

Unlike Mykilska Borshchahivka, which was built on vacant land, neighboring Pivdenna Borshchahivka was built on the site of the villages of Bratska Borshchahivka and Mykilska Borshchahivka. The latter was "cut" by the Ring Road, part of the village became part of Kyiv and was demolished for the construction of the neighborhood, while the other part was annexed to Sofiivska Borshchahivka. In 1980, construction of a residential area consisting of six neighborhoods began on the site of the villages. Its main thoroughfare is Symyrenko Street. The southern part of Bratska Borschagivka has survived to this day as a single-family development.

The initial plans saw the settlement of the estate by workers from the surrounding factories, in particular the Electronmash plant. However, over the past 50 years, the situation has changed: a large number of industrial enterprises have ceased to exist, and a significant part of the residents work in other areas of the city.

=== Russo-Ukrainian war ===
On 29 March 2022, during the Russian invasion of Ukraine, as a result of a missile attack, a local resident was killed and residential buildings were damaged. The neighborhood was also damaged during the Battle of Kyiv.

== See also ==
- Saltivka
