= Sviatoshyn (Kyiv Metro) =

Kyiv Metro Station

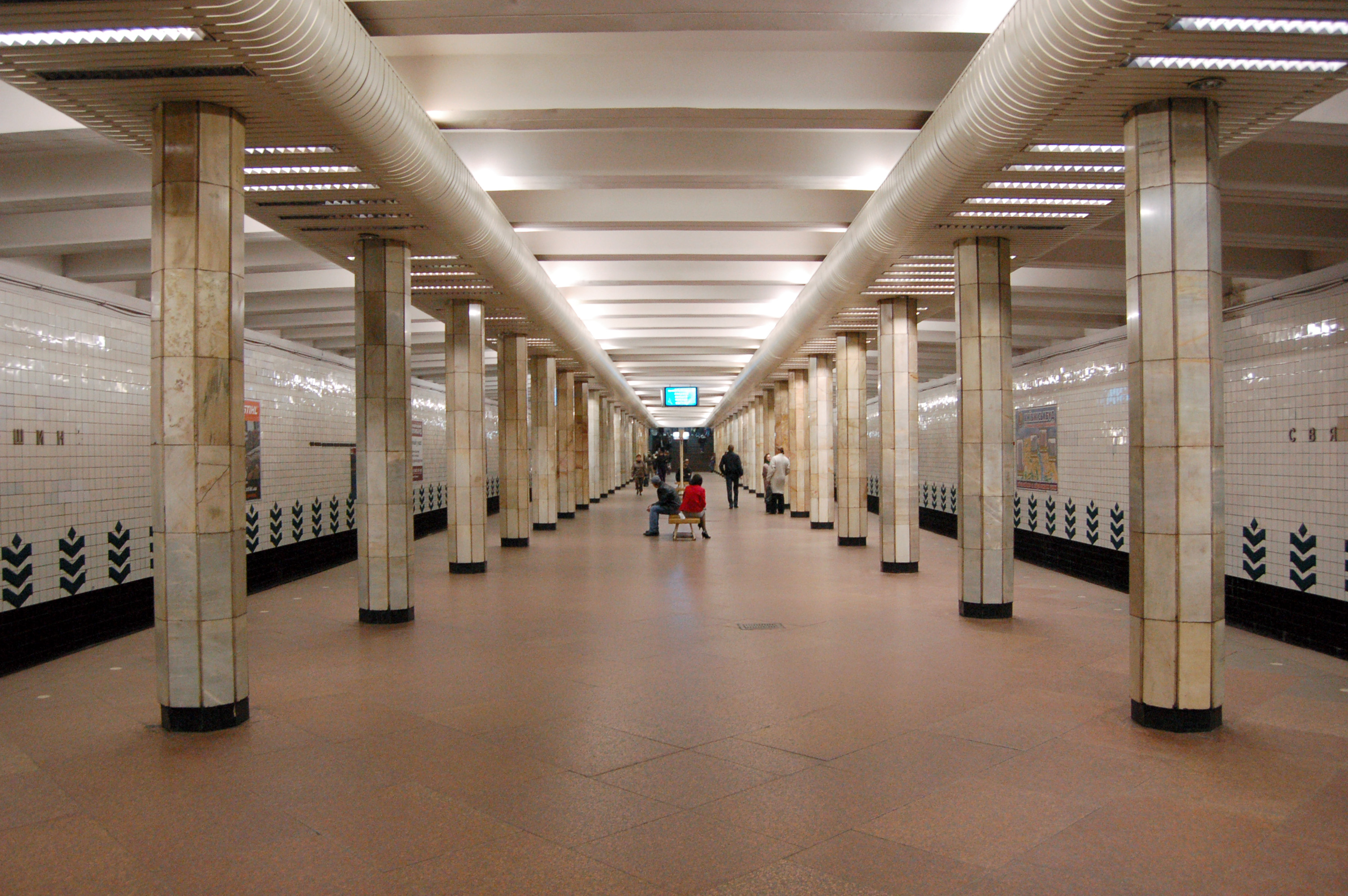
- The Station Hall

General information
- Location: Sviatoshynskyi District; Kyiv; Ukraine
- Coordinates: 50°27′27″N 30°23′31″E
- System: Kyiv Metro station
- Owner: Kyiv Metro
- Line: Sviatoshynsko–Brovarska line
- Platforms: 1
- Tracks: 2

Construction
- Structure type: underground
- Depth: 12 m (39 ft)
- Platform levels: 1

Other information
- Station code: 112

History
- Opened: 5 November 1971
- Former names: Sviatoshyno

Services
Preceding station	Kyiv Metro	Following station
Zhytomyrska towards Akademmistechko	Sviatoshynsko–Brovarska line	Nyvky towards Lisova
Location

Sviatoshyn (Ukrainian: Святошин,) is a station on the Sviatoshynsko-Brovarska Line of the Kyiv Metro system that serves Kyiv, the capital city of Ukraine. The station was opened on 5 November 1971, and is named after Kyiv's Sviatoshyn neighborhood. It was designed by H.V. Holovko, N.S. Kolomiiets, and M.M. Syrkin. The station was formerly known as Sviatoshyno (Ukrainian: Святошино).

The station is shallow underground, along with the Beresteiska and the Nyvky stations, which are the first stations of the Kyiv Metro system that are not lain deep underground. The station consists of a central hall with rows of circular columns near the platforms. On the tiled walls along the tracks is an "abstract" motif. The entrance to the station is connected with passenger tunnels on both ends of the station, passing under the Prospect Beresteiskyi (Brest Avenue). The western exit is connected to the Sviatoshyn railway station.
