= Nikolai Krasnov (pilot) =

Soviet World War II flying ace

- Николай Фёдорович Краснов
- Born: 9 December 1914; Knyazhichi village, Vladimir Governorate, Russian Empire
- Died: 29 January 1945 (aged 30) near Budapest, Hungary
- Military career
- Allegiance: Soviet Union
- Branch: Soviet Air Force
- Service years: 1930—1934, 1941—1945
- Rank: Major
- Conflicts: World War II
- Awards: Hero of the Soviet Union

Nikolai Fyodorovich Krasnov (Russian: Николай Фёдорович Краснов; 9 December 1914 — 29 January 1945) was a Soviet fighter pilot during World War II. Wounded six times in the war before his in crash, he totaled over 40 solo shootdowns during the conflict, making him one of the top Soviet aces of the conflict. Earlier in the war on 4 February 1944 he was awarded the title Hero of the Soviet Union for his initial victories.

== Early life ==
Krasnov was born on 9 December 1914 to a Russian family in Knyazhichi village. A high school graduate, he enlisted in the Red Army in 1930 and went on to graduate from the Tambov Military Aviation School of Pilots in 1934 before being assigned to the Dnieper squadron. Subsequently in 1936 he was sent to work as a test pilot at an aircraft plant in Berdyansk, where he tested new propeller models. He then relocated to Perm in 1938, where he tested engines at OKB-19 and Plant No.19, which eventually became Perm Airlines.

== World War II ==
Immediately after the start of German invasion of the Soviet Union, Krasnov was on the frontlines of war; for the first few months he served as a pilot in the 402nd Special-purpose Fighter Aviation Regiment before sustaining a serious injury on 6 October during an aerial battle that confined him to a hospital for several months. Nevertheless, during that brief amount of time in combat during the difficult days of the German advance, he managed to tally one shared and three solo aerial victories, piloting the MiG-3.

Shortly after returning to combat in March 1942 as a navigator in the 31st Fighter Aviation Regiment, his LaGG-33 was shot down over enemy territory on 31 May, leaving him with a wounded leg. Due to the gravity of the situation, he burned the wreckage of his aircraft to prevent it from being used by the enemy, and then made his way through the forest to Soviet-controlled territory, and nine days later he returned. Later that April he returned to flying, and on 31 May he scored what would be his only aerial victory for 1942 when he shot down a Bf 110 over a Kursk airfield.

Later on in the war in June 1943 he was transferred to the 116th Fighter Aviation Regiment, where he mastered the new La-5 fighter. There, he flourished, first tallying seven shootdowns in the month of July and many more in the following months, including shooting down three Bf 109 in a single battle on 6 September. Later that year in December, when he had already reached the position of squadron commander and the rank of captain, he was nominated for the title Hero of the Soviet Union for his accomplishments, which consisted of flying 279 combat sorties, engaging in 85 aerial battles, and tallying 30 solo shootdowns (plus a shared one) at the time.

In February 1944 he was formally awarded the title Hero of the Soviet Union and returned to the 31st Fighter Aviation Regiment, where he served until briefly going back to the 116th Fighter Regiment in August. However, he soon transferred to a different regiment again, this time to the 530th Fighter Aviation Regiment in October, where he remained for the rest of his life. On 29 January 1945 he was killed in a crash landing after suffering engine failure while returning from a combat mission and unsuccessfully attempting to make an emergency landing away from his airfield. His remains were buried at the walk of fame at the Monument to the Unknown Sailor in Odessa. Throughout the war he flew over 400 sorties, engaged in over 100 aerial battles, and totaled 41 solo shootdowns plus the one shared kill.

== Awards ==
- Hero of the Soviet Union (4 February 1944)
- Order of Lenin (4 February 1944)
- Two Order of the Red Banner (27 November 1941 and 30 July 1943)
- Order of Alexander Nevsky (6 March 1944)
- Order of the Patriotic War 1st class (5 November 1942 and 14 February 1945)
- campaign medals
