= Zhytomyrska (Kyiv Metro) =

Kyiv Metro Station

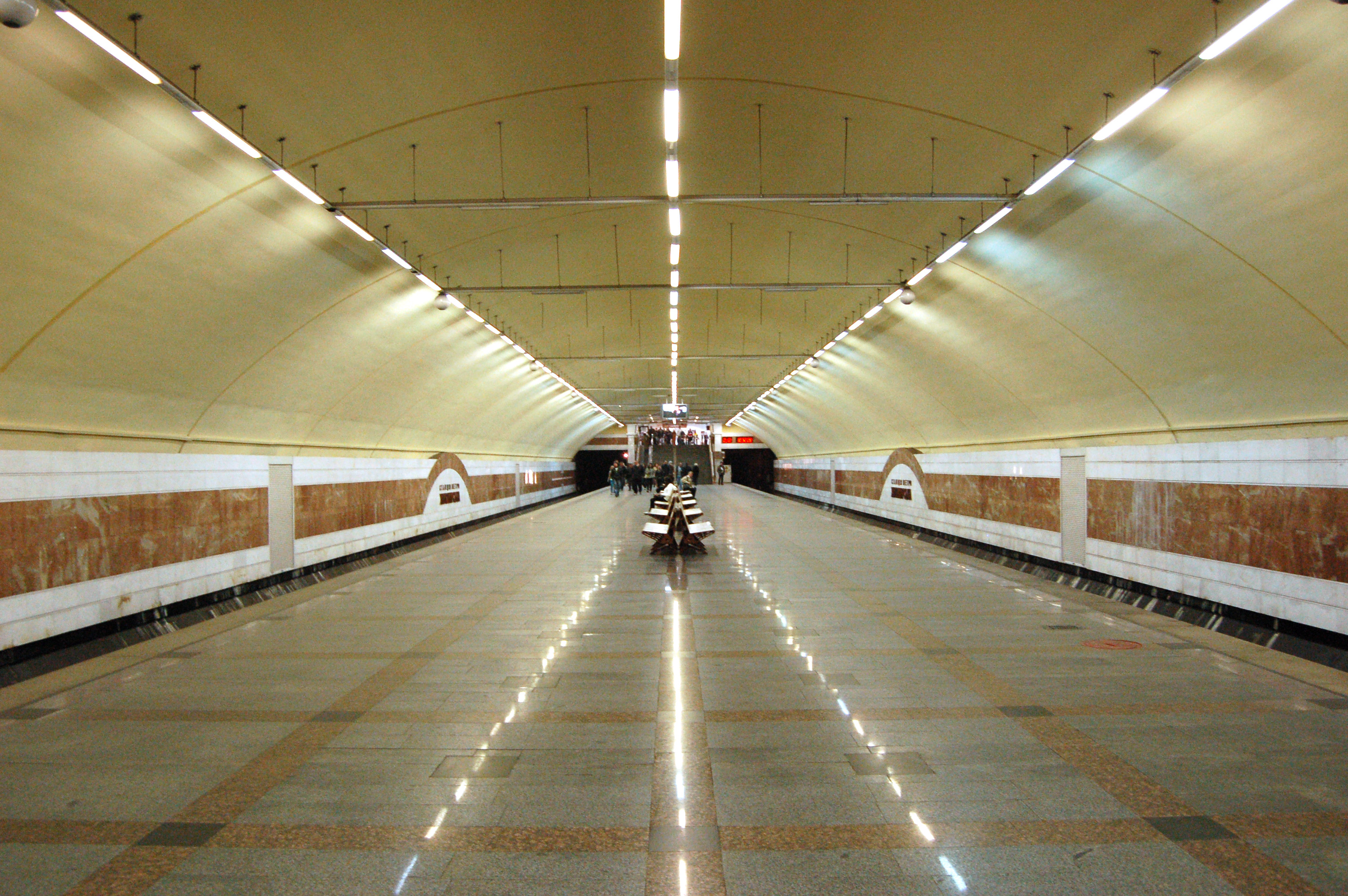

General information
- Location: Sviatoshynskyi District; Kyiv; Ukraine
- Coordinates: 50°27′21″N 30°21′51″E
- System: Kyiv Metro station
- Owner: Kyiv Metro
- Line: Sviatoshynsko–Brovarska line
- Platforms: 1
- Tracks: 2

Construction
- Structure type: underground
- Depth: 10 m (33 ft)
- Platform levels: 1

Other information
- Station code: 111

History
- Opened: 24 May 2003

Services
Preceding station	Kyiv Metro	Following station
Akademmistechko Terminus	Sviatoshynsko–Brovarska line	Sviatoshyn towards Lisova
Location

Zhytomyrska (Ukrainian: Житомирська,) is a station on the Sviatoshynsko-Brovarska Line of the Kyiv Metro system that serves Kyiv, the capital city of Ukraine. The station was opened on 24 May 2003 as part of the westward extension of the Sviatoshynsky radius along with its neighbour Akademmistechko.

Designed by the architects V. Gnevyshev, T. Tselikovskaya and N. Aleshkin, the station was the first on the line to be built to a single-vault design "walls in earth", i.e. where the walls of the station pit are incorporated into the design, and the main vault rests on top of them, thus saving time and resources for construction.

In its decoration, marble is used on the walls (white and red) and on the floor. Lighting comes from suspended fluorescent tubes, and the station features catamaran-style rises on the walls where the station name is displayed.

Presently the station is the most westwards on the main Peremohy Avenue, and is only a few kilometres from Kyiv's circular motorway separating the city and Kyiv Oblast. The avenue then becomes the M17 (E40) intercity motorway and continues westwards into Western Ukraine including the city of Zhytomyr (for which the station is named). As a result, it receives a moderate passenger traffic from the regional areas.

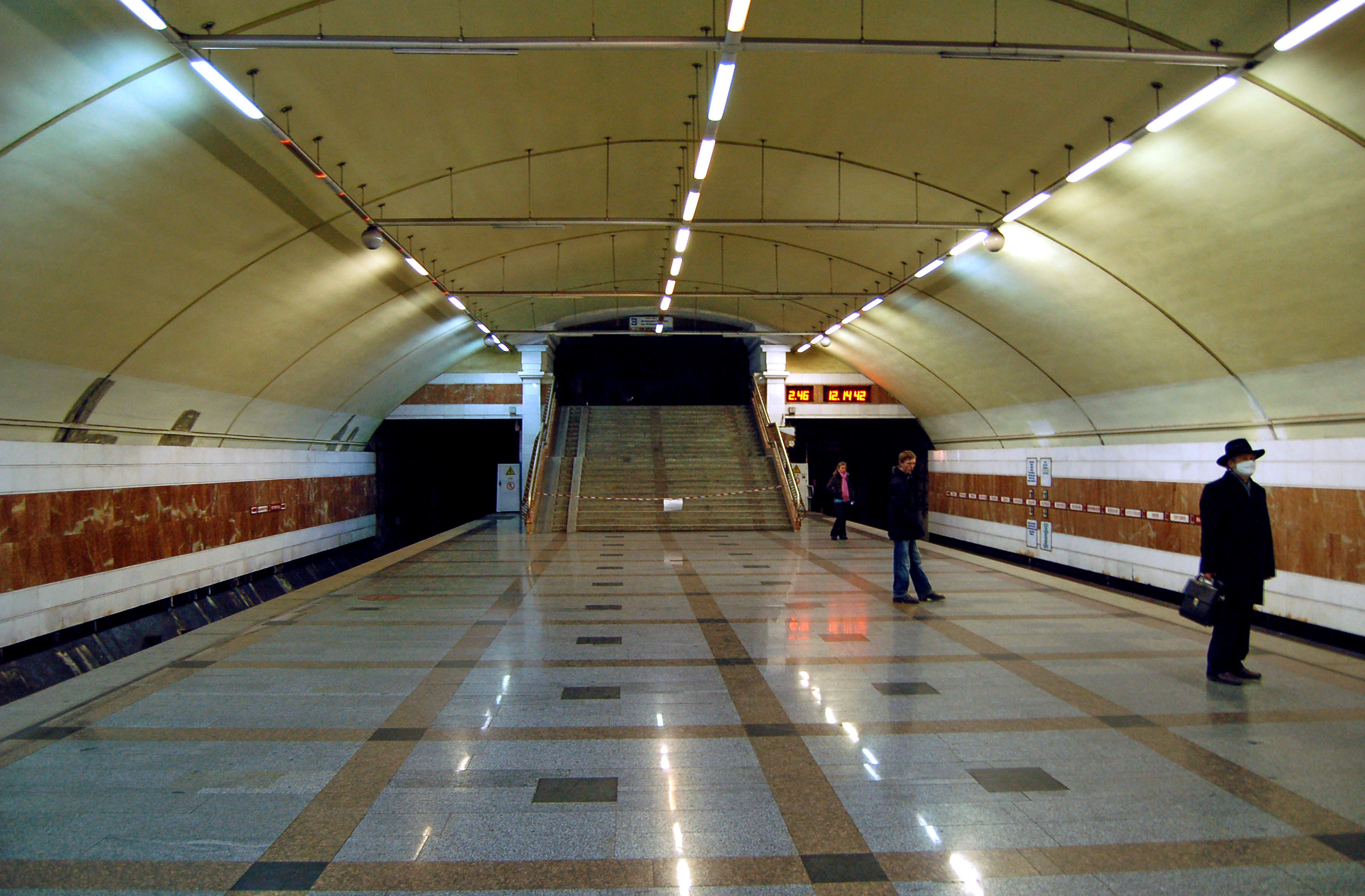
Full view

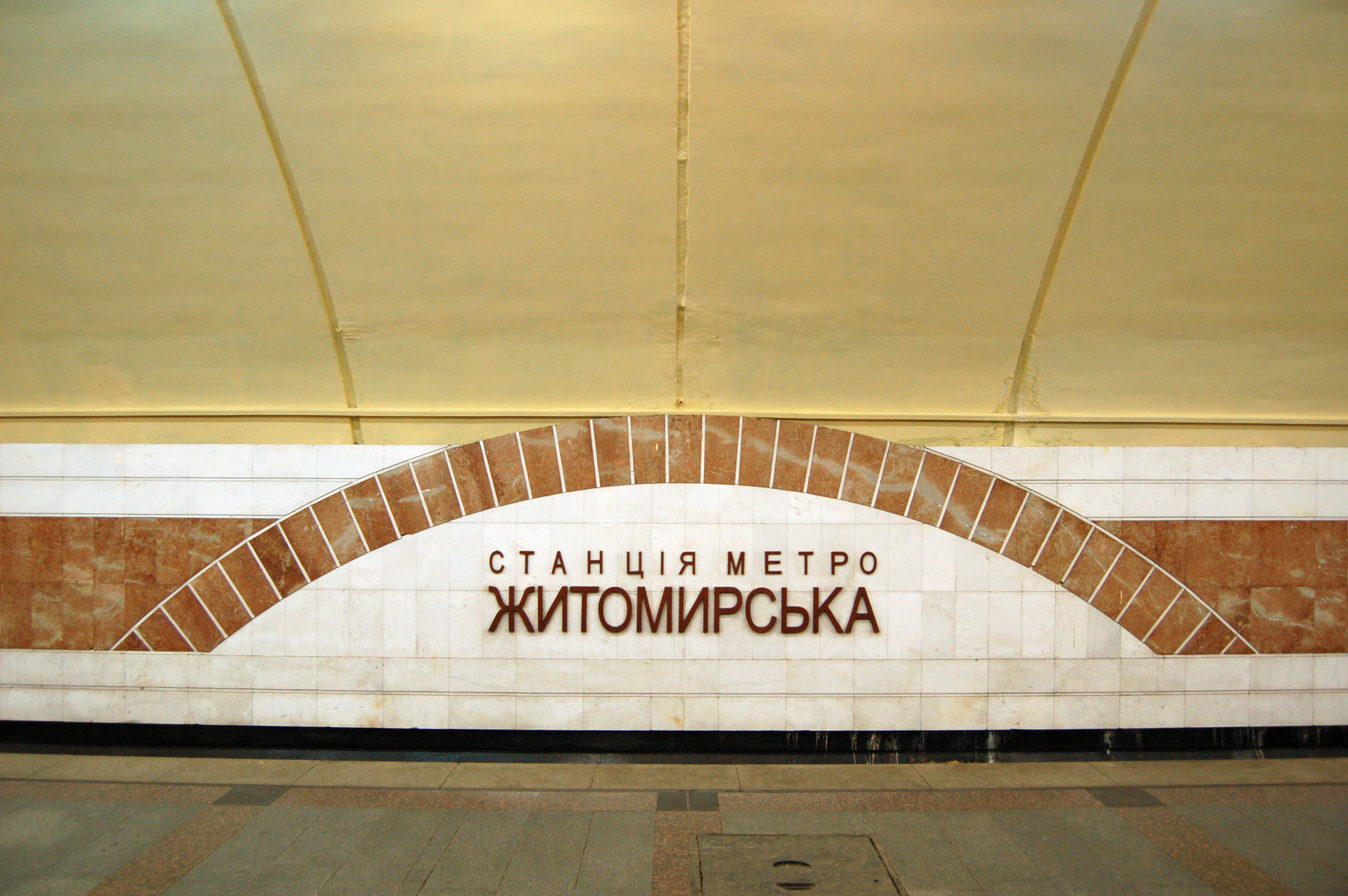
Station name

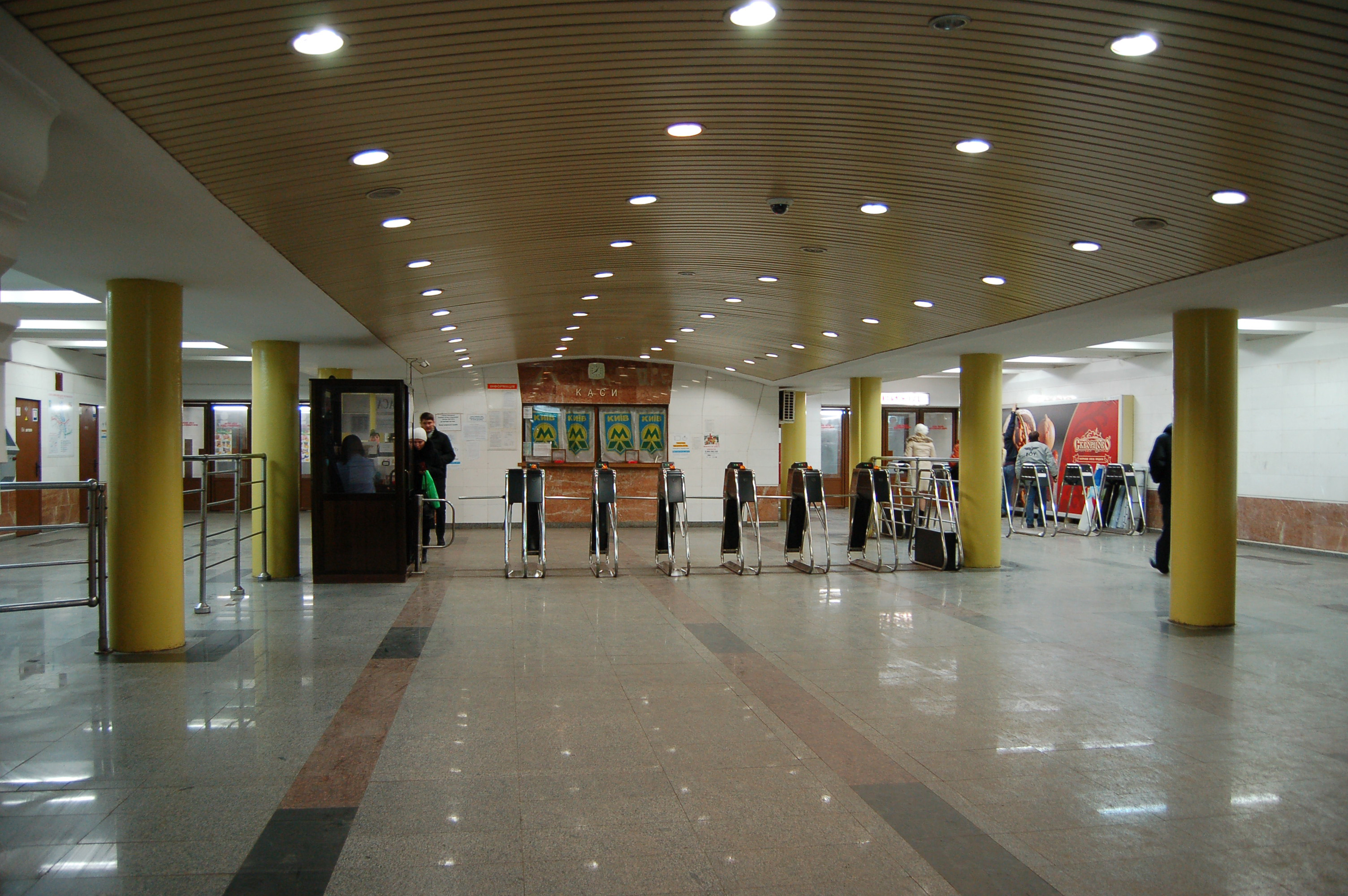
Entrance hall
