= Borshchahivka (river) =

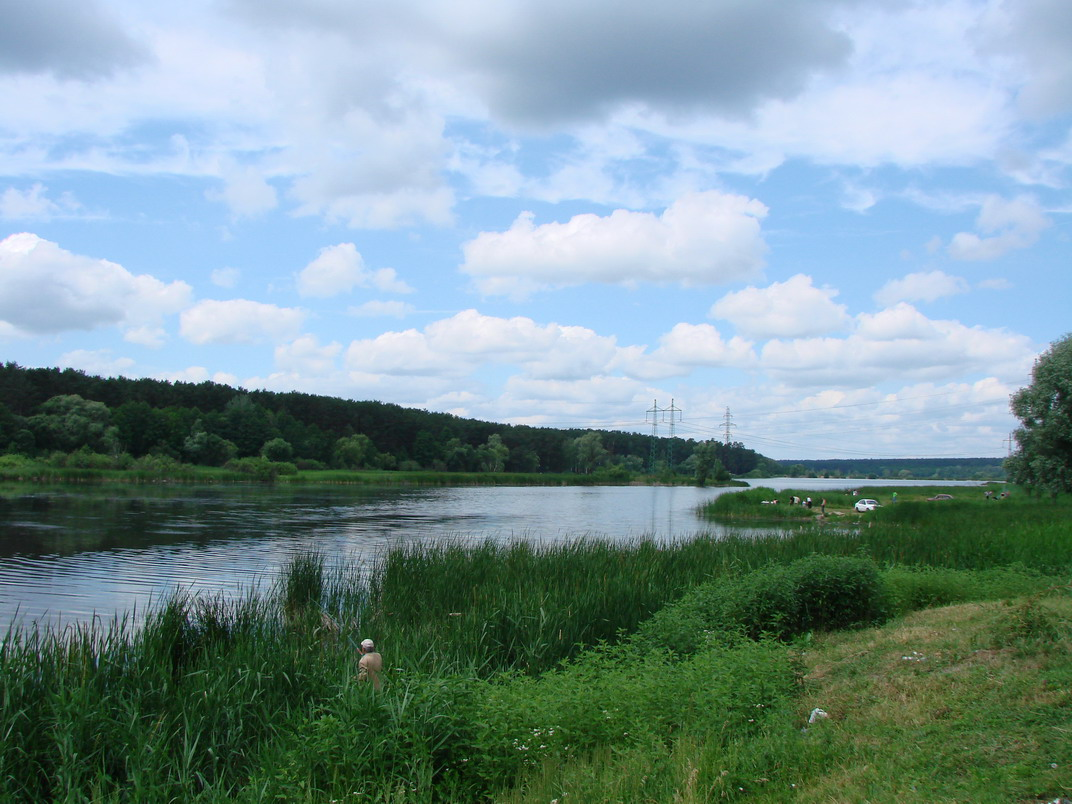
- Native name: Борщагівка (Ukrainian)

Location
- Country: Ukraine
- Region: Kyiv Oblast

Physical characteristics
- Source
  - location: Holosiivskyi District
  - coordinates: 50°22′18″N 30°27′48″E
- Mouth
  - location: Irpin
  - coordinates: 50°28′3″N 30°14′54″E
- Length: 20 km (12 mi)
- Basin size: 94 km^{2} (36 sq mi)

Basin features
- Progression: Irpin→ Dnieper→ Dnieper–Bug estuary→ Black Sea

The Borshchahivka is a river in Ukraine, flowing through the city of Kyiv and suburban Bucha Raion of Kyiv Oblast. It is a right tributary of the Irpin in the Dnieper basin.

== Names ==
- Borshchahivka – the modern name.
- Zhelian – mentioned in Hypatian Codex.
- Nyvka – variant of the name.
- Nova Hreblia – old name; mentioned on old maps.
