= Sviatoshynskyi District =

Coordinates: 50°27′18″N 30°22′05″E

Sviatoshynskyi District Святошинський район
- Urban district in Kyiv
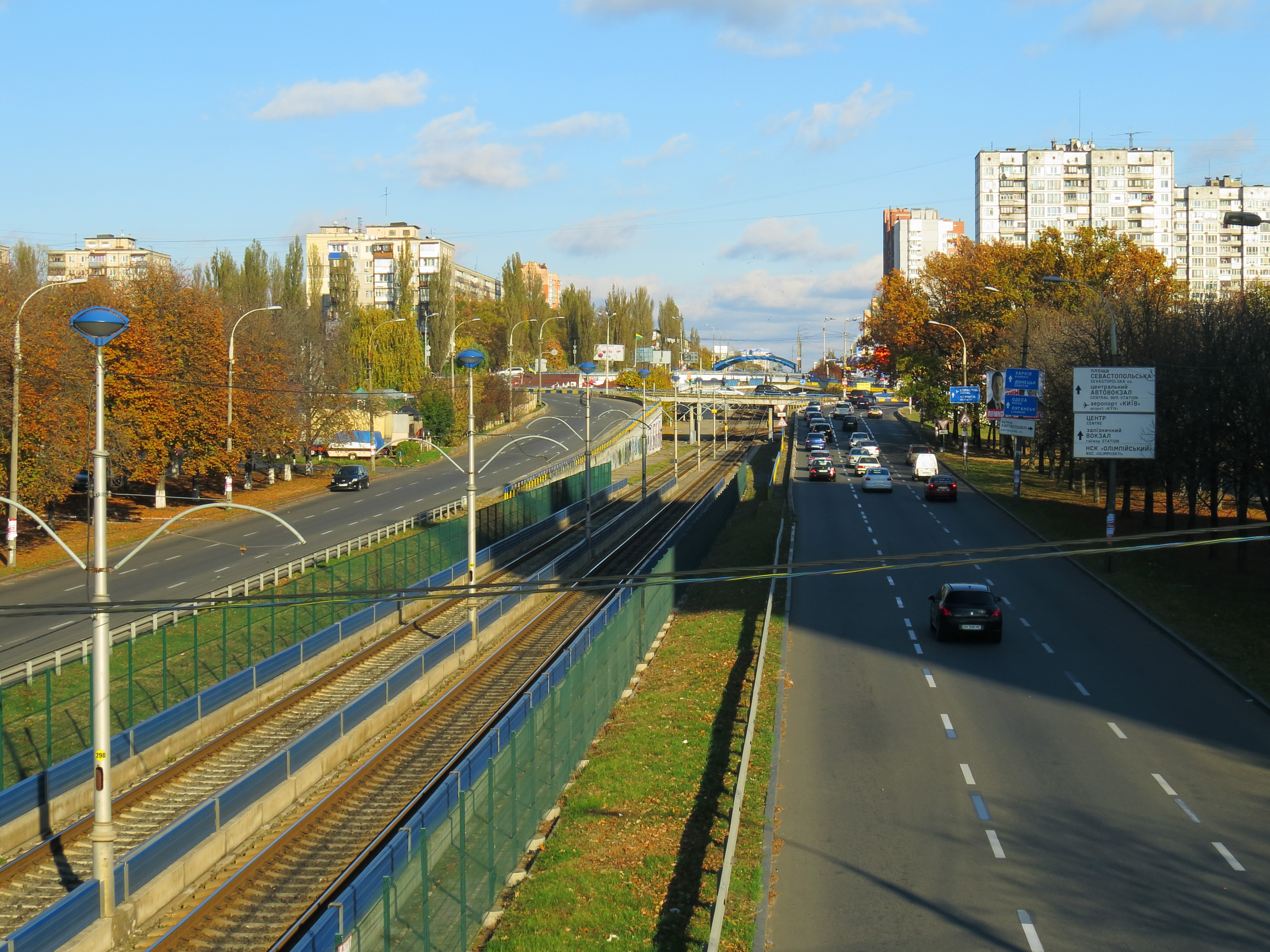
- Les Kurbas Avenue

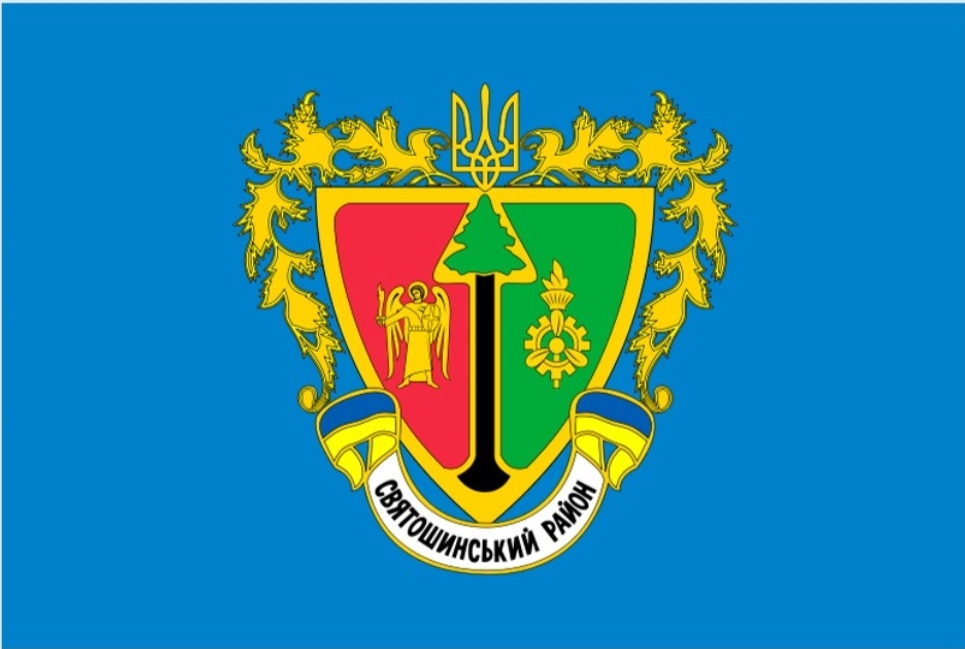
- Flag Coat of arms

- Country: Ukraine
- Oblast: Kyiv City Municipality

Area
  - Total: 110 km^{2} (42 sq mi)

Population
  - Total: 318,400
  - Density: 2,894/km^{2} (7,500/sq mi)
- Time zone: UTC+2 (EET)
  - Summer (DST): UTC+3 (EEST)
- Metro stations: Akademmistechko, Zhytomyrska, Sviatoshyn
- Website: svyat.kyivcity.gov.ua

Sviatoshynskyi District (Note: Ukrainian: Святошинський район, romanized: Sviatoshynskyi raion) is an urban district in the city of Kyiv located at the western part of city. The district was created in 2001 after renaming the former Leningrad District. It borders four other districts in Kyiv such as Podilskyi District, Obolonskyi District, Solomianskyi District, Shevchenkivskyi District as well as Bucha Raion that administratively is part of Kyiv Oblast. It takes its name from the historical neighbourhood of Sviatoshyn, named for the 12th century Prince Mykola Sviatosha..

== Historical neighborhoods ==
The district includes number of neighborhoods: Sviatoshyn, Borshchahivka, Akademmistechko, Aviamistechko, Bilychi, Bratska Borshchahivka, Berkovets, Nyvky 4, Bilychi, Novobilichi, Katerynivka, Zhovtneve, Mykilska Borshchahivka, Pivdenna Borshchahivka, Mykhailivska Borshchahivka, Peremoha and Galagany.

== Kyiv-Sviatoshyn Raion ==
Historically the district was referred to as Leninhradskyi and was renamed on 27 April 2001 after one of its neighbourhoods that commemorate. Its length is over 12 km, with a total area of 65.75 hectares and includes 5 parks. The governing bodies of adjacent Kyiv-Sviatoshyn Raion of Kyiv Oblast, until it was abolished in 2020, were situated in the Sviatoshyn District of Kyiv as the former oblast raion was purely suburban and lacked a distinctive center settlement.

== Demographics ==
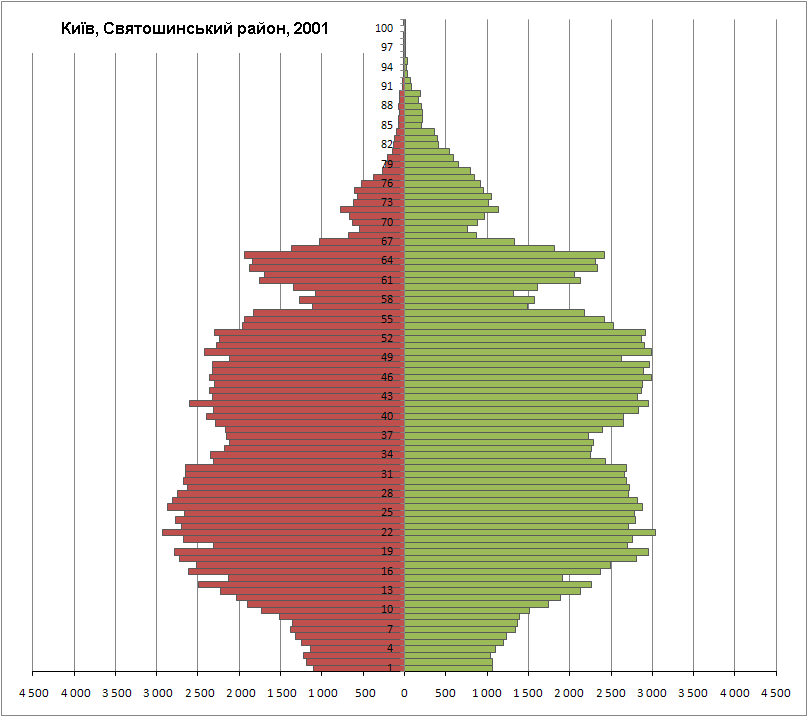
Gender and age pyramid of the population of Sviatoshynskyi district in 2001

Population of the district: 2001 – 315,410; 2008 – 327,970; 2020 – 342,544.

=== Language ===
Distribution of the population by native language according to the 2001 census:

Language	Number	Percentage
Ukrainian	239 970	77.16%
Russian	66 903	21.51%
Other (Note: Those who did not indicate their native language or indicated a language that was native to less than 1% of the local population.)	4 132	1.33%
Total	311 005	100.00%

== Sports and health care ==
There are 5 adult and 5 children's polyclinics, a children's clinical hospital, a maternity hospital, 5 hospitals and dispensaries in the district. The residents of the district have at their disposal 5 stadiums, the Nauka sports complex, 4 children's sports schools, and numerous sports clubs. There is a sanatorium for war and labor veterans and a geriatric boarding house in the district.

The main sports center of the district is the TEMP Stadium Sports Complex (10A Generala Vitruka Street). Reconstruction of the complex began in 2017 at the initiative of the district authorities. As of June 2019, 4 additional fields have been built at the stadium.

In 2016–2018, 25 football fields with artificial turf systems were built in educational institutions in the district.

== Enclave on territory of district ==
Sviatoshynskyi district is the only administrative-territorial unit of the capital of Ukraine, on the territory of which the village of Kotsiubynske is located, which is an enclave of the city of Irpin, Kyiv Oblast.

== See also ==
- Subdivisions of Kyiv
