= International Exhibition Centre =

Exhibition centre in Kyiv, Ukraine

- Exterior view of the complex (2006)
- Interactive map of International Exhibition Centre
- Address: Brovarskyi Avenue 15
- Location: Kyiv, Ukraine
- Coordinates: 50°27′08″N 30°35′29″E
- Public transit: Livoberezhna

Construction
- Built: 1999–2002
- Opened: October 2002
- Expanded: 2005, 2018
- Architect: Janusz Wig

Website
- mvc-expo.com.ua

The International Exhibition Centre (Ukrainian: Міжнародний виставковий центр, romanized: Mizhnarodnyi vystavkovyi tsentr) in Kyiv is the largest exhibition centre in Ukraine. Located in the western portion of Livoberezhnyi microdistrict, the center was opened in October 2002, and the head of the center since its construction was Anatoliy Tkachenko.

In May 2017 IEC was the host venue of the Eurovision Song Contest 2017.

== History ==
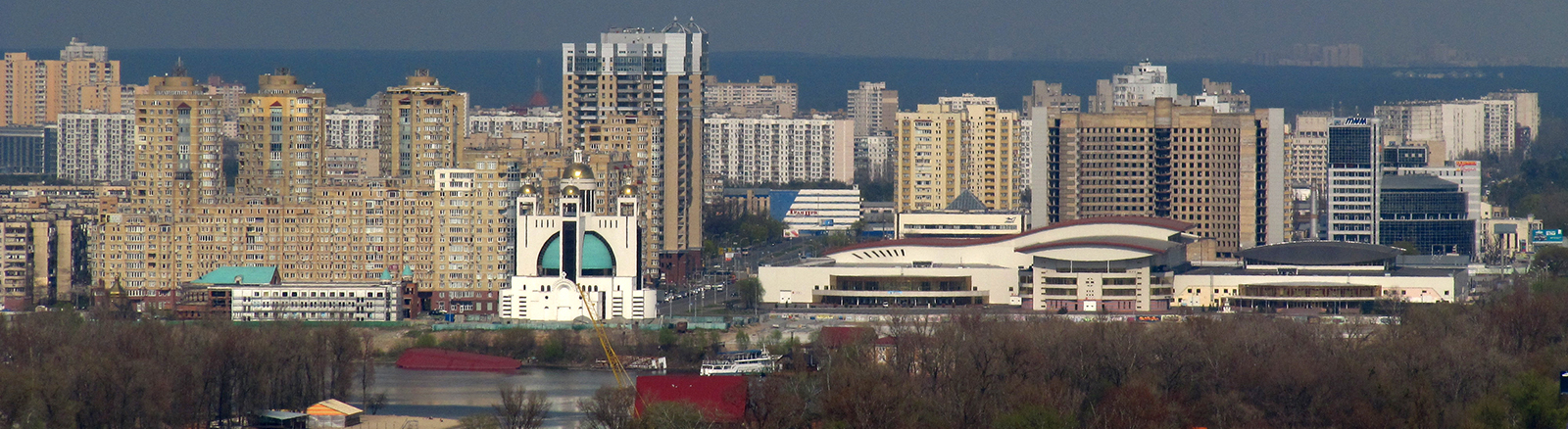
Cathedral of the Resurrection of Christ next to IEC (right) in April 2011

The location for future construction at the left bank of Kyiv was formerly a Mykilska Slobidka settlement. In the times of Soviet Union it was demolished to build Livoberezhnyi microdistrict, near the Metro Bridge which was connecting the area to the right bank of Dnieper it was planned to build a futuristic public center, but the project was never completed in its full scale.

The idea of building the International Exhibition Centre was from Viktor Tkachenko, then director of the Palace of Sports. Hungaro-Ukrainian architect Janusz Wig designed the complex, and Eduard Safronov was the head of its construction. The first pavillon of the exhibition center was built between 1999 and 2002; it was opened in October 2002. The IEC was built according to the modern standards and became one of the leaders of forum organizers, holding almost fifty events in 2003. Throughout 2004–2005 two new pavillons were built, resulting in the exhibition centre now being able to hold more than 100 events per year.

In 2013, the centre held the 20th OSCE Ministerial Council, getting the OSCE Certificate for a high quality organization.

In 2015 International Exhibition Centre announced the plans of expanding the building with 2-level parking at the area of 8.93 ha.

28 December 2016 National Television Company of Ukraine rented the IEC for ₴35,1 million to host the Eurovision Song Contest 2017. The surrounding area has been repaired and the contest took place 11-13 May.

Following the Eurovision the expansion of the complex began. The project included new exhibition halls, underground parking, concert hall and a 13-storey hotel. In 2017–2018 the fourth hall was built but the rest of the project hadn't been built.

During the COVID-19 pandemic in 2020 it was briefly planned to use IEC as a hospital, setting over 900 beds inside but the idea didn't go any further. 29 May 2021 a vaccination center has been opened in the complex.

In 2021 it was planned to hold an investment contest to build a multistorey parking for IEC.

== Architecture ==
The center combines in a single architectural ensemble three pavilions with a total area of 58,000 sqm, of which 28,018 m² are for exhibitions. The complex has a congress hall and fourteen conference rooms with a capacity of 90-600 seats, meeting rooms, rooms for storing valuables and weapons, cafes and fast food restaurants, bathrooms, toilets and air conditioning.

== Gallery ==
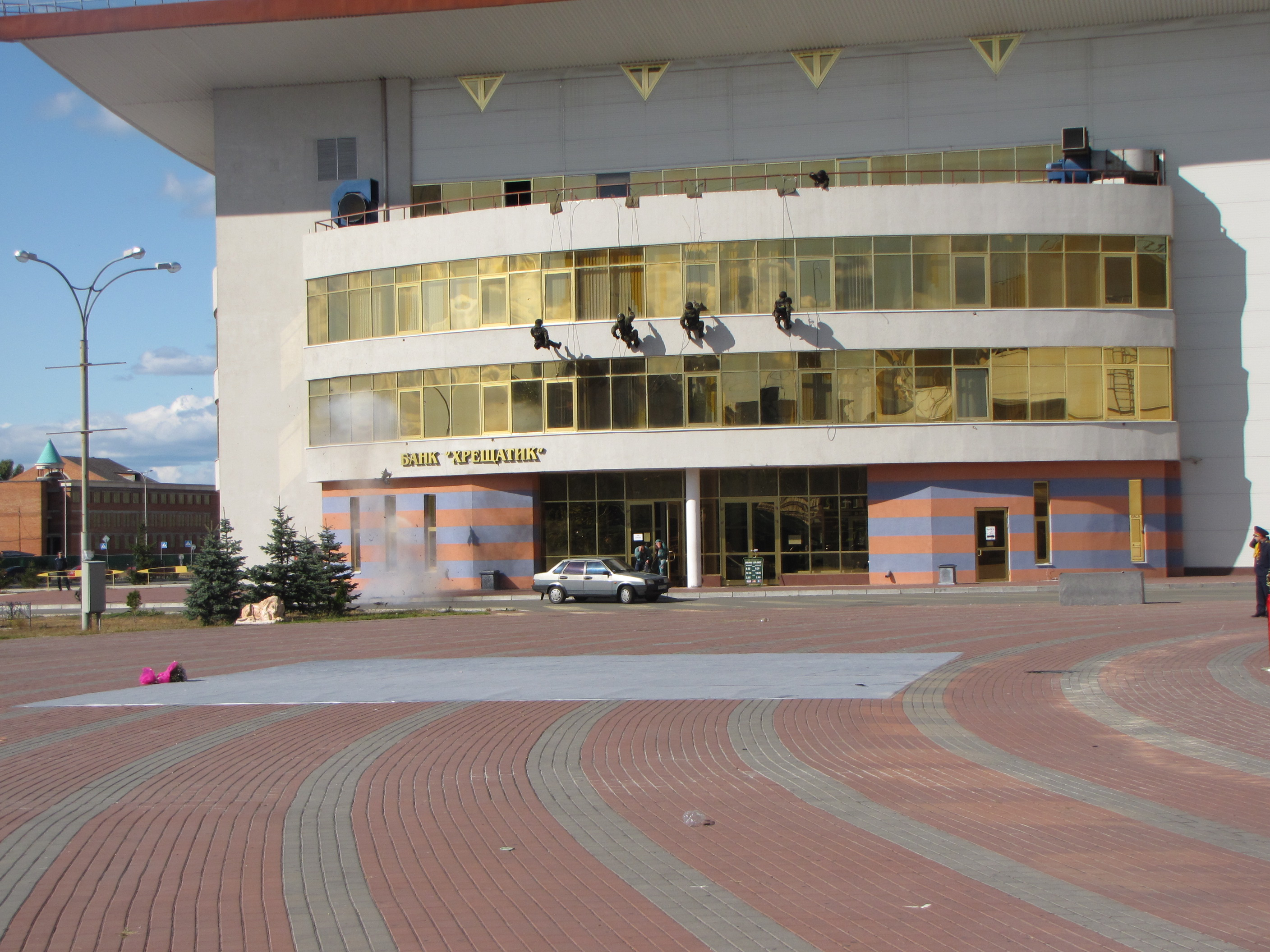
Special forces training at the complex

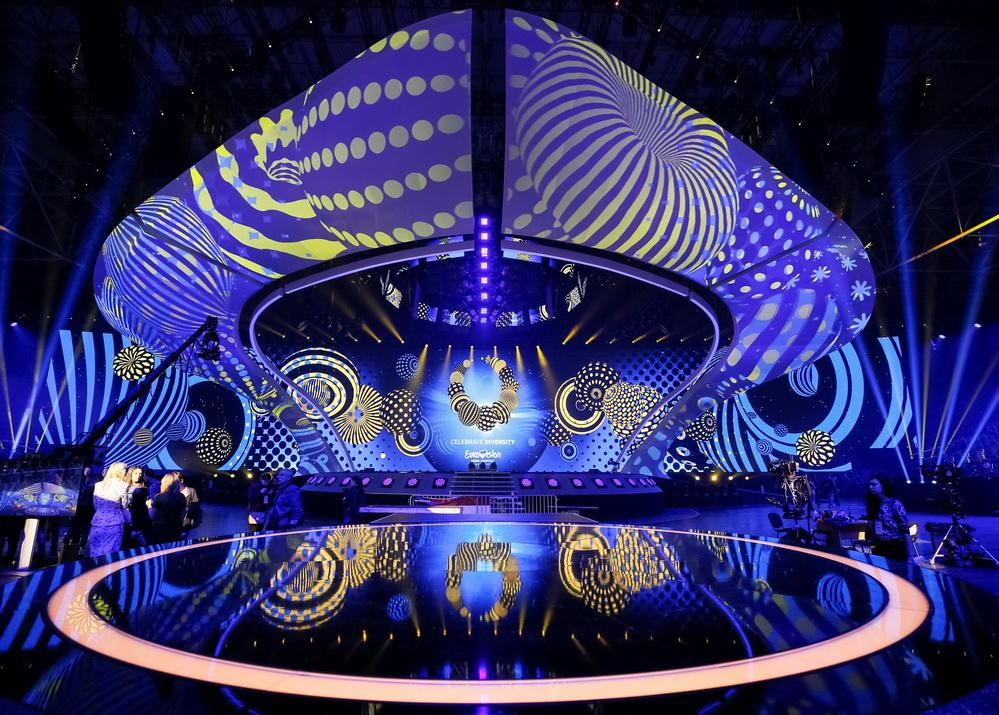
The stage of Eurovision Song Contest 2017

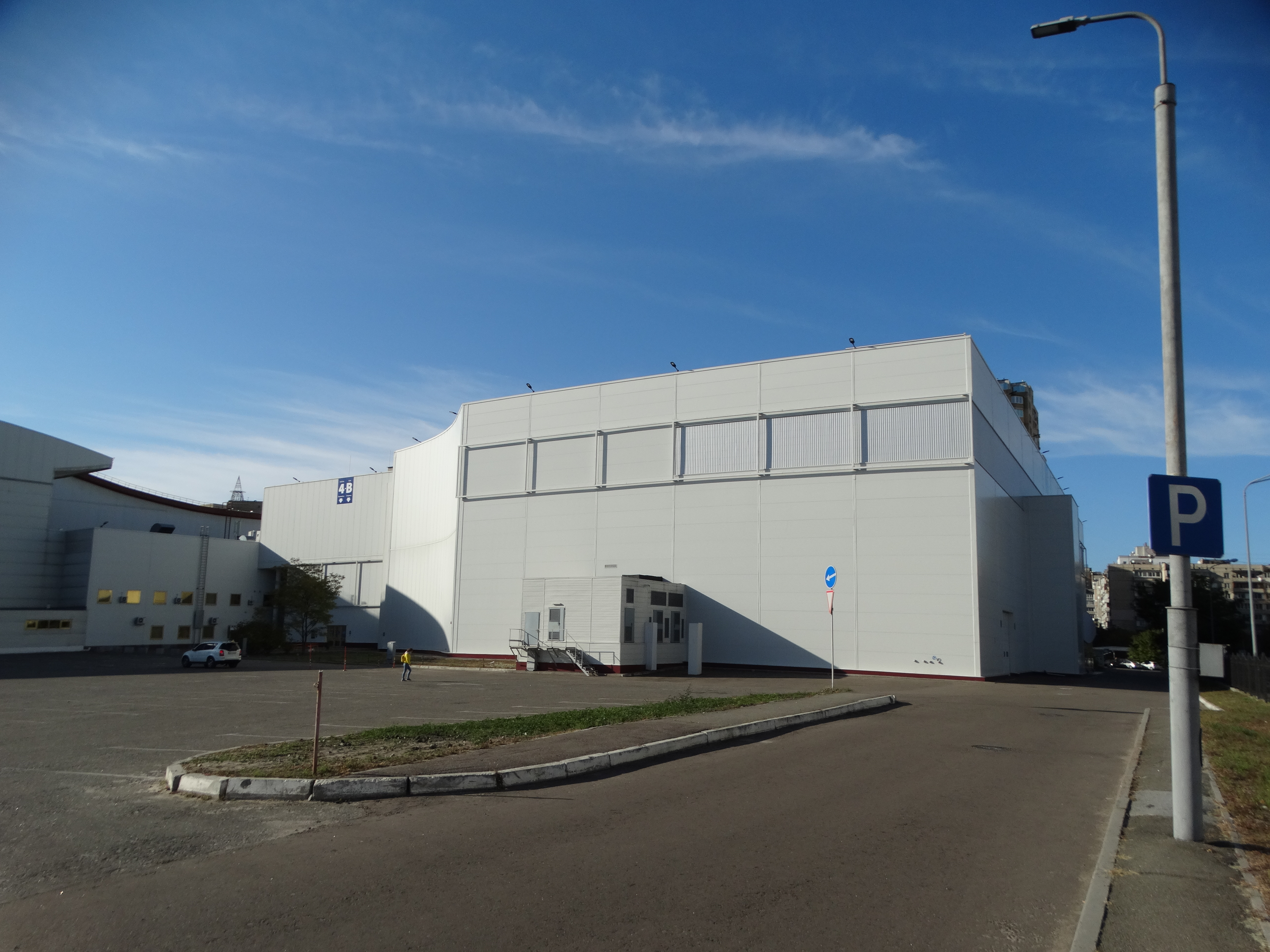
Fourth hall of the complex

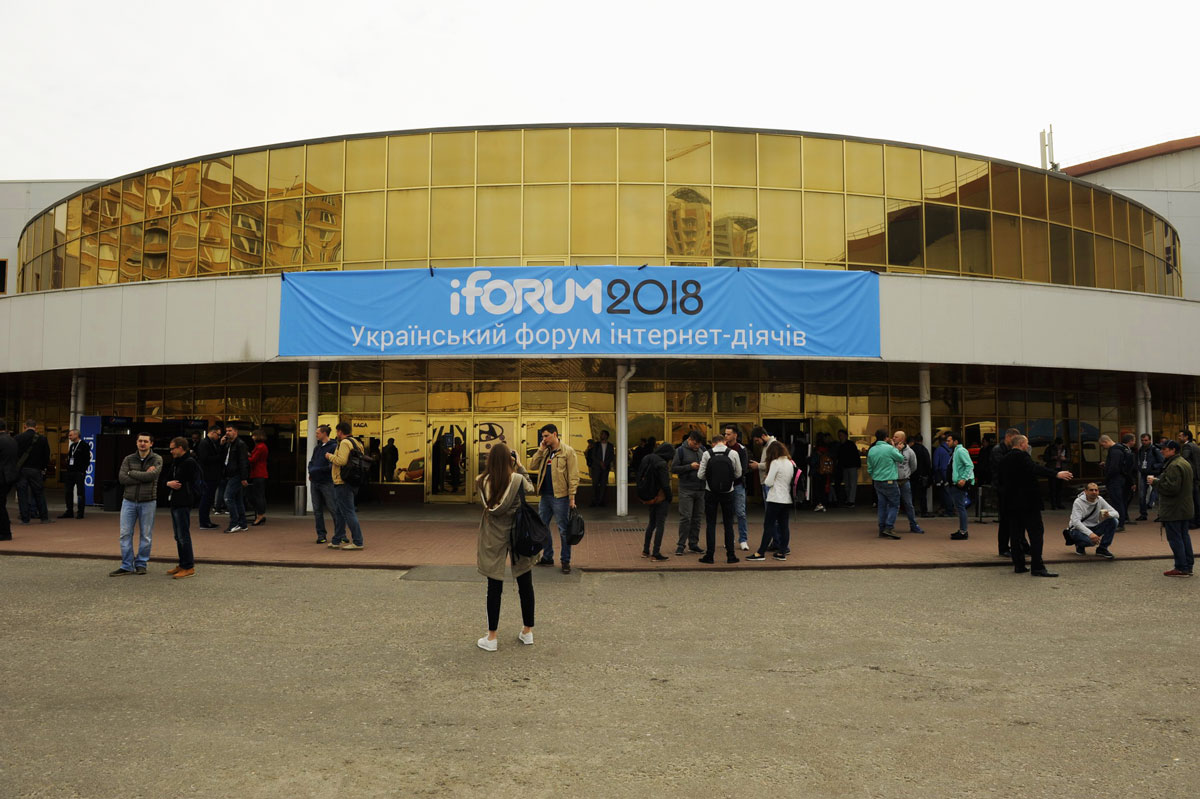
Entrance to the IEC

== See also ==
- List of convention and exhibition centers

Preceded by Globe Arena; Stockholm	Eurovision Song Contest; Venue; 2017	Succeeded by Altice Arena; Lisbon
