= Levoberezhny =

Levoberezhny (masculine), Levoberezhnaya (feminine), or Levoberezhnoye (neuter) may refer to:

- Levoberezhny District, several districts and city districts in Russia
- Levoberezhny (rural locality) (Levoberezhnaya, Levoberezhnoye), several rural localities in Russia

== See also ==
- Livoberezhna (disambiguation)
- Pravoberezhny (disambiguation)
