= Livoberezhnyi =

Livoberezhnyi or livoberezhna (masculine and feminine, Ukrainian: Лівобережний, Лівобережна; literally: "left-bank") may refer to one of the following:

== Geography ==
- Livoberezhnyi Masyv, a neighbourhood of Kyiv, Ukraine
- Livoberezhnyi neighborhood, Dnipro, a microdistrict of Dnipro, Ukraine
- Left-bank Ukraine, a historic name of the part of Ukraine on the left (East) bank of the Dnieper River

== Transport ==
- Livoberezhna (Kyiv Metro), a station on the Kyiv Metro
- Livoberezhna line (Kyiv Metro), a proposed rapid transit line of the Kyiv Metro
- Livoberezhna line (Kyiv Light Rail), a rapid transit line of the Kyiv Light Rail
