= Cathedral of the Resurrection of Christ, Kyiv =

Ukrainian Greek Catholic Church in Ukraine

Coordinates: 50°27′8.64″N 30°35′13.2″E

View of the cathedral

The Cathedral of the Resurrection of Christ (Ukrainian: Патріа́рший собо́р Воскресі́ння Христо́вого УГКЦ, romanized: Patriarshyi sobor Voskresinnia Khrystovoho UHKTs, literally Patriarchal Cathedral of the Resurrection of Christ) is the main cathedral of the Ukrainian Greek Catholic Church, located in Kyiv, the capital of Ukraine. The church was opened on March 27, 2011. While the locally used term "patriarchal" reflects Ukrainian Greek Catholic desire to have their major archbishop recognized as a "patriarch," the Catholic Church does not officially regard this sui iuris church as a "patriarchate".

== History ==
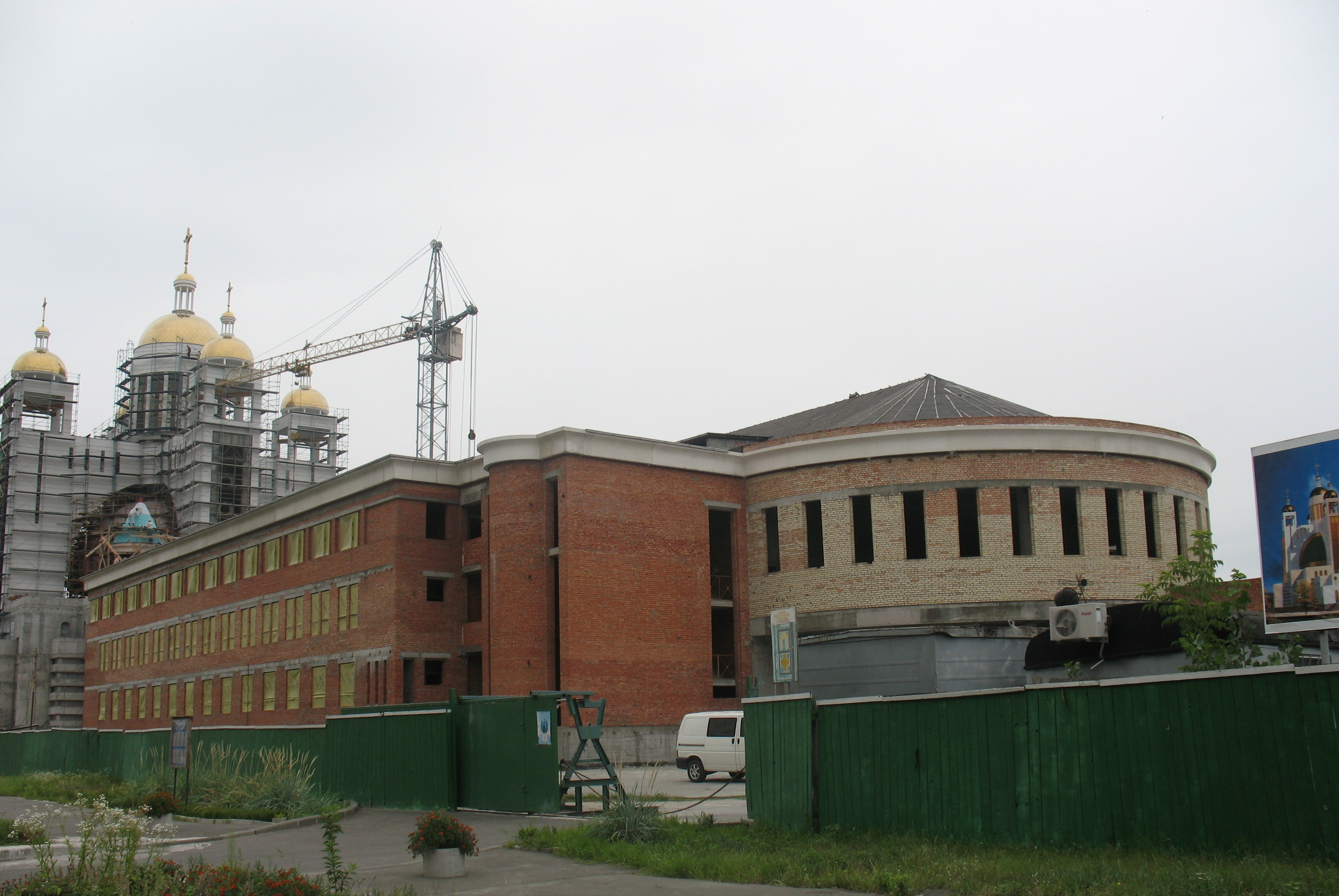
Construction of Patriarchal Cathedral of the Resurrection of Christ in Kyiv, 30 July 2009

The project of the cathedral of architect Mykola Levchuk won the first prize at the All-Ukrainian review-competition of the National Union of Architects of Ukraine for the best architectural work of the last three years in the nomination "Projects of 2000" [1] [October 27, 2002, bishops of the UGCC. Construction of the complex began on September 9, 2002. By June 2003, the basement (zero) floor of the Patriarchal Cathedral was built and the construction of the administrative building began. By the end of 2004, the walls were erected, first to the 13.2 m mark, and later to the pylon (level of the central vault of the church) part of the cathedral.

On October 10, 2004, five crosses of the cathedral were consecrated and erected. All bishops of the UGCC on four continents of the world took part in the consecration. The largest cross on the central dome was raised and erected that day.

At the end of 2005, the installation of the metal frame of the central vault of the church began. This metal structure, which has a diameter of 20 m, was transported to the construction site in parts. It was lifted in segments (only four) and then connected. The work was completed only in early summer 2006. The first service in the church was held on January 19, 2006, on the feast of the Epiphany. Held in the basement of the cathedral.

Funds for the construction of the church were provided not only by believers from Ukraine, but also by Ukrainian Greek Catholics from Poland, Germany, USA, Canada and Argentina.

On June 5, 2017, on the Day of the Holy Spirit in the crypt of the Patriarchal Cathedral of the Resurrection of Christ of the UGCC in Kyiv, the body of the head of the Ukrainian Greek Catholic Church in 2001–2011 of the Supreme Archbishop of Kyiv-Halych (2005–2011) Lubomyr Husar died. The funeral took place with a large crowd, with the participation of the most honorable bishops of the UGCC, representatives of other denominations, the diplomatic corps

== Consecration of the cathedral ==
Interior

Major archbishop Sviatoslav Shevchuk consecrated the cathedral on August 18, 2013, on the occasion of the 1025th anniversary of the Baptism of Ukraine by the Head of the Ukrainian Greek Catholic Church. More than 20,000 pilgrims (according to other sources from 30 to 50,000) and more than 700 priests came to the pilgrimage on the occasion of the consecration of the cathedral.

Sviatoslav placed the relics of the Holy Apostles Peter and Paul and Andrew the First-Called, Pope Clement and Martin who perished in Ukraine, the Holy Martyr Josaphat Kuntsevich, the Blessed Martyrs of the 20th century Mykola Charnetsky and Josaphat Kotsylov on the throne of the newly built church.

Together with members of the Synod, Papal Nuncio Edward Thomas Galikson, Cardinal Ayudris Yuzas Bachkis, Papal Envoy, and Roman Catholic bishops, the head of the UGCC celebrated Divine Liturgy.

The cathedral is located in the Livoberezhnyi Masyv on the left-bank of the Dnieper River (Dnipro), being one of the few major churches of Kyiv that are not located on the right-bank.

The Patriarchal Council together with the administrative building form the Patriarchal Center of the UGCC are located at st. Mykilsko-Slobidska, 5 (metro station Livoberezhna), with an area of 1.72 hectares.

== Bibliography ==
Cathedral at night (2018)

- "Patriarchal cathedral". Ukrainian Greek Catholic Church (in Ukrainian).
- "The Patriarchal Cathedral of the Resurrection of Jesus in Kyiv may become the main church". Ukrainian Greek Catholic Church (in Ukrainian). Archived from the original on 2007-07-07.
- Gudzyk, Klara (November 11, 2003). "The Cathedral of the Resurrection of Christ of the Ukrainian Greek Catholic Church is under construction in Kyiv". Den'.
- "200 hryvnias are collected by the Stryi community for the construction of the Cathedral of the Resurrection of Jesus of the UGCC in Kyiv". zik.com.ua (in Ukrainian). August 9, 2006.
