= Levoberezhny (rural locality) =

Levoberezhny (Russian: Левобере́жный; masculine), Levoberezhnaya (Левобере́жная; feminine), or Levoberezhnoye (Левобере́жное; neuter) is the name of several rural localities in Russia:

- Levoberezhny, Omsk Oblast, a crossing loop in Bogoslovsky Rural Okrug of Omsky District in Omsk Oblast; 55°01′N 73°32′E
- Levoberezhny, Rostov Oblast, a khutor in Zadonskoye Rural Settlement of Azovsky District in Rostov Oblast; 46°57′N 39°38′E
- Levoberezhny, Stavropol Krai, a settlement in Pokoynensky Selsoviet of Budyonnovsky District in Stavropol Krai
- Levoberezhny, Vologda Oblast, a settlement in Osinovsky Selsoviet of Nikolsky District in Vologda Oblast
- Levoberezhnoye, Chechen Republic, a selo in Levoberezhnenskaya Rural Administration of Naursky District in the Chechen Republic
- Levoberezhnoye, Kaliningrad Oblast, a settlement in Yasnovsky Rural Okrug of Slavsky District in Kaliningrad Oblast
- Levoberezhnoye, Krasnoyarsk Krai, a selo in Filimonovsky Selsoviet of Kansky District in Krasnoyarsk Krai
- Levoberezhnaya, a village in Kablukovskoye Rural Settlement of Kalininsky District in Tver Oblast
