= Levoberezhny District =

Levoberezhny District is the name of several administrative and municipal districts in Russia. The name literally means "located on the left bank".

== Districts of the federal subjects ==
Location of Moscow in Russia

- Levoberezhny District, Moscow, a district in Northern Administrative Okrug of Moscow

== City divisions ==
- Levoberezhny Territorial Okrug, a city okrug of Lipetsk, the administrative center of Lipetsk Oblast
- Levoberezhny City District, Voronezh, a city district of Voronezh, the administrative center of Voronezh Oblast
Cities in Russia with a city division called "Levoberezhny"

== See also ==
- Levoberezhny (disambiguation)
