= Pravoberezhny =

Pravoberezhny (masculine), Pravoberezhnaya (feminine), or Pravoberezhnoye (neuter) may refer to:

- Pravoberezhny District, several districts and city districts in Russia
- Pravoberezhny Municipal Okrug, a municipal okrug of Nevsky District in the federal city of St. Petersburg, Russia
- Pravoberezhny (rural locality) (Pravoberezhnaya, Pravoberezhnoye), several rural localities in Russia
- Pravoberezhnaya line, alternative name of Line 4 of the Saint Petersburg Metro, Saint Petersburg, Russia
- Right-bank Ukraine (Pravoberezhna Ukraina), a historic name of the part of Ukraine on the right (West) bank of the Dnieper River
- Pravoberezhna line of the Kyiv Light Rail, Kyiv, Ukraine
