= Pravoberezhny District =

Pravoberezhny District is the name of several administrative and municipal districts in Russia. The name literally means "located on the right bank".

== Districts of the federal subjects ==
- Pravoberezhny District, Republic of North Ossetia–Alania, an administrative and municipal district of the Republic of North Ossetia–Alania

== City divisions ==
- Pravoberezhny City District, Bratsk, a city district of Bratsk, a city in Irkutsk Oblast
- Pravoberezhny Territorial Okrug, a city okrug of Lipetsk, the administrative center of Lipetsk Oblast
- Pravoberezhny City District, Magnitogorsk, a city district of Magnitogorsk, a city in Chelyabinsk Oblast
Cities in Russia with a city division called "Pravoberezhny"

== See also ==
- Pravoberezhny (disambiguation)
