= Levoberezhny, Vologda Oblast =

Levoberezhny Левобережный
- Settlement
- Location within Vologda Oblast Location within Russia
- Coordinates: 59°28′N 45°26′E
- Country: Russia
- Region: Vologda Oblast
- District: Nikolsky District
- Time zone: UTC+3:00

Levoberezhny (Russian: Левобережный) is a rural locality (a settlement) in Krasnopolyanskoye Rural Settlement, Nikolsky District, Vologda Oblast, Russia. The population was 262 as of 2010. There are 8 streets.

== Geography ==
Levoberezhny is located 11 km southwest of Nikolsk (the district's administrative centre) by road. Osinovo is the nearest rural locality.
