= Pravoberezhny (rural locality) =

Pravoberezhny (Russian: Правобере́жный; masculine), Pravoberezhnaya (Правобере́жная; feminine), or Pravoberezhnoye (Правобере́жное; neuter) is the name of several rural localities in Russia:

- Pravoberezhny, Orenburg Oblast, a settlement in Novocherkassky Selsoviet of Saraktashsky District of Orenburg Oblast
- Pravoberezhny, Rostov Oblast, a settlement in Volochayevskoye Rural Settlement of Orlovsky District of Rostov Oblast
- Pravoberezhny, Budyonnovsky District, Stavropol Krai, a settlement in Budyonnovsky District of Stavropol Krai
- Pravoberezhny, Kursky District, Stavropol Krai, a settlement in Kursky District of Stavropol Krai
