= Livoberezhnyi Masyv =

Kyiv neighbourhood

Coordinates: 50°26′51″N 30°35′48″E

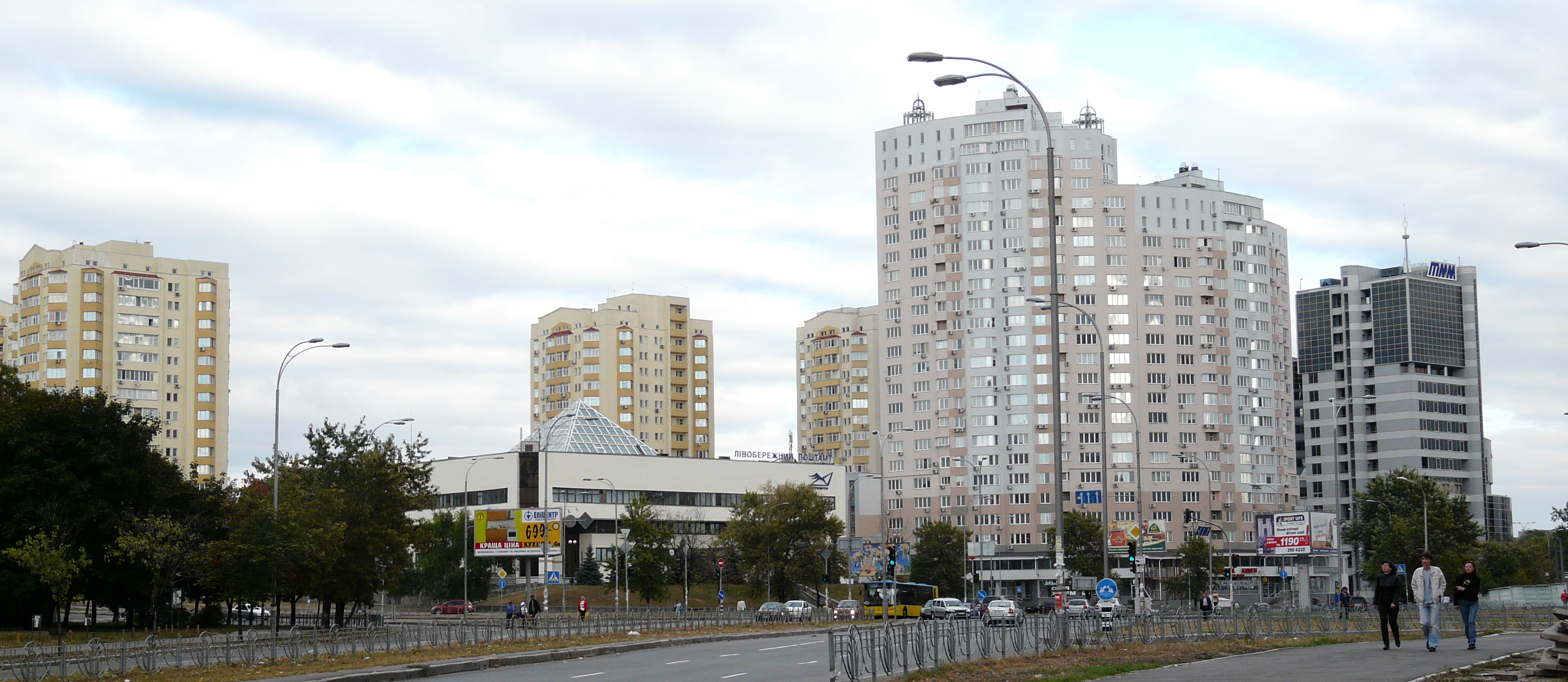
Livoberezhka's high-rise residential buildings near the metro station.

The Livoberezhnyi Masyv (Ukrainian: Лівобережний масив), commonly known as Livoberezhka (Ukrainian: Лівобережка) is a residential neighbourhood of the Ukrainian capital Kyiv. The neighbourhood is administratively a part of the Dnipro Raion, and is located on the city's left bank (which it is named for).

The neighbourhood is surrounded by the Dnipro River to its west, Darnytsia to its north and east, Berezniaky to its southeast, and Rusanivka to its south. It was created in the 1960s-1970s on the territory of the Mykilska Slobidka, a former settlement on the outskirts of Kyiv.

== Transport ==
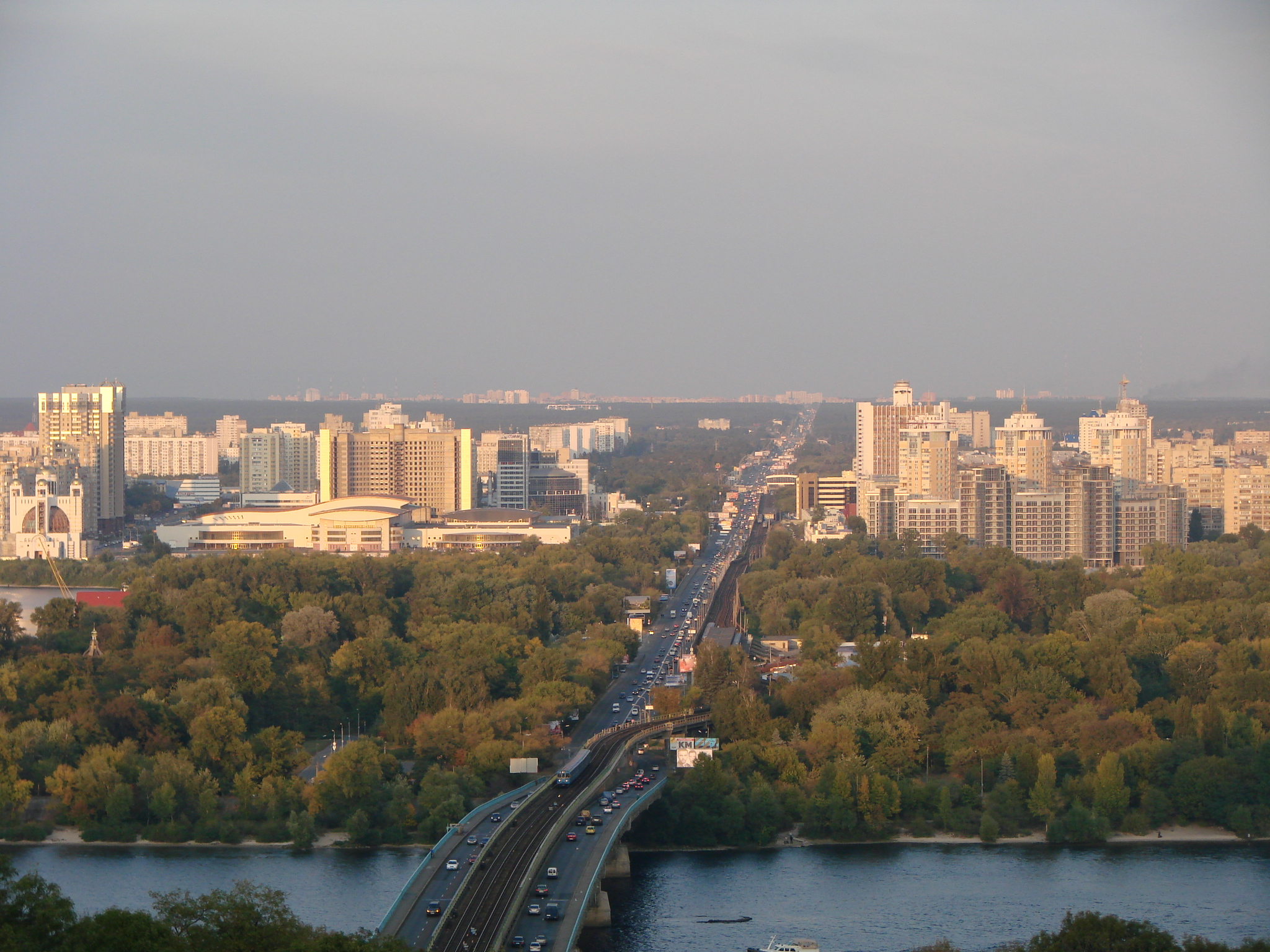
View of Livoberehzka from the city's right-bank. The Kyiv Metro Bridge is seen in the center.

The Livoberezhnyi neighbourhood is serviced by the Livoberezhna station of the Kyiv Metro's Sviatoshynsko–Brovarska line, where a number of city buses and marshrutkas connect. In addition, the Kyiv Urban Electric Train has a flag stop located in walking distance from the metro station.

Through the neighbourhood passes highway-like Brovarskyi prospect that continues on towards Brovary.

== Attractions ==
The International Exhibition Centre, Ukraine's largest expo building, is located on the neighbourhood's western portion. In addition, the 27-story "Tourist" Hotel is located in the neighbourhood in direct proximity to the metro station. The Ukrainian Greek Catholic Church's main patriarchal cathedral is also located in the neighbourhood.

== Gallery ==
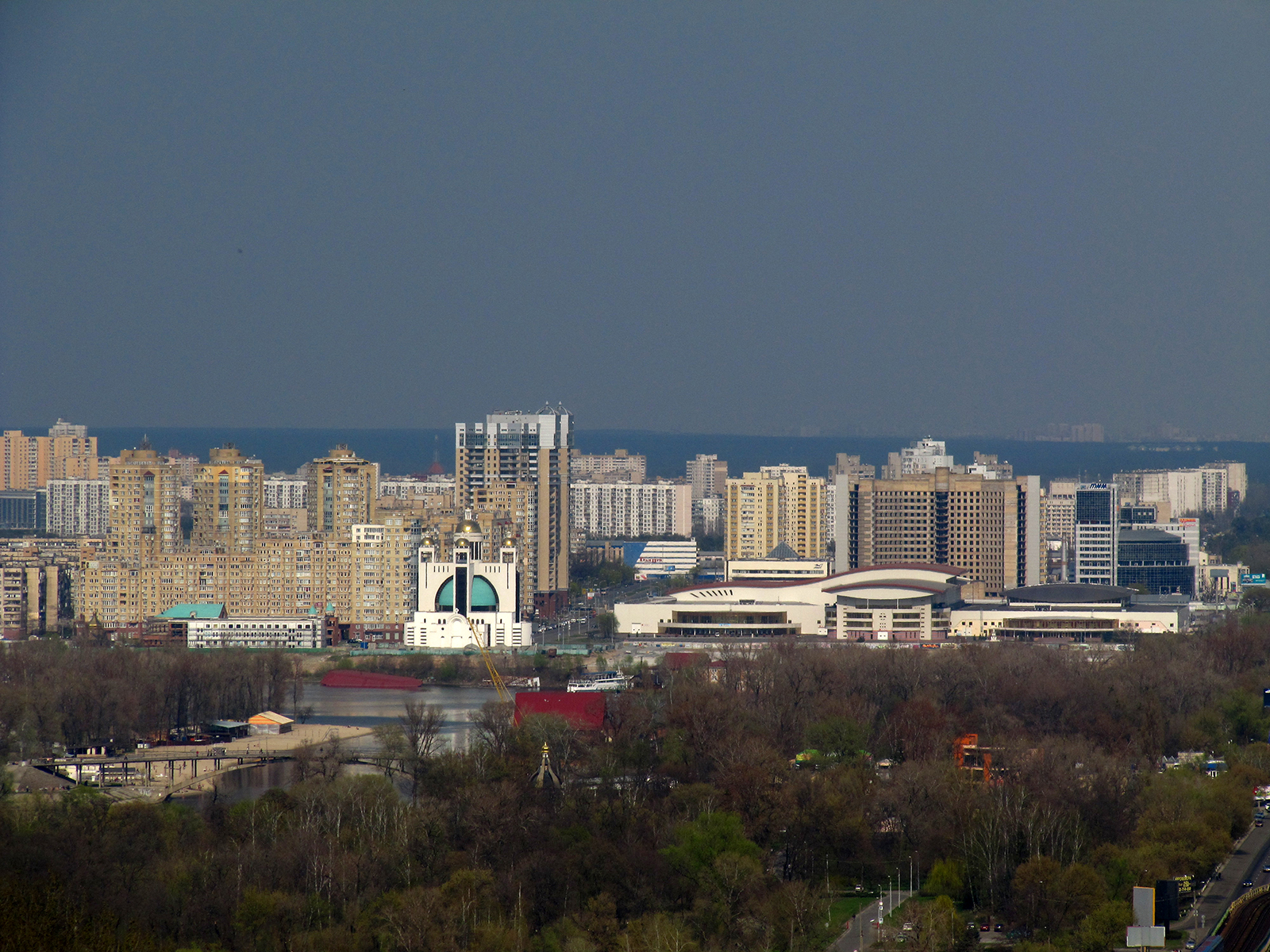
View on the Patriarchal cathedral (left) and International Exhibition Centre (right)
