= Mykilska Slobidka =

Coordinates: 50°26′51″N 30°35′48″E

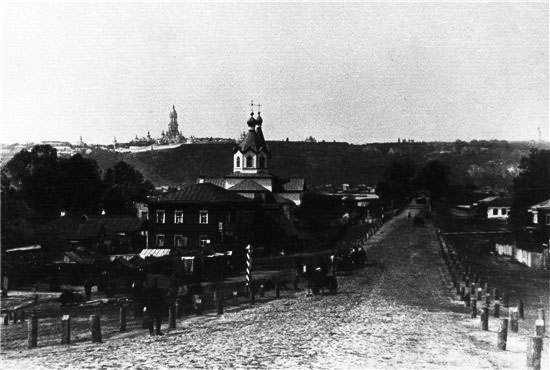
View of the St. Nicholas Church in the Mykilska Slobidka with the Kyiv Pechersk Lavra seen in the background, ca. 1880s

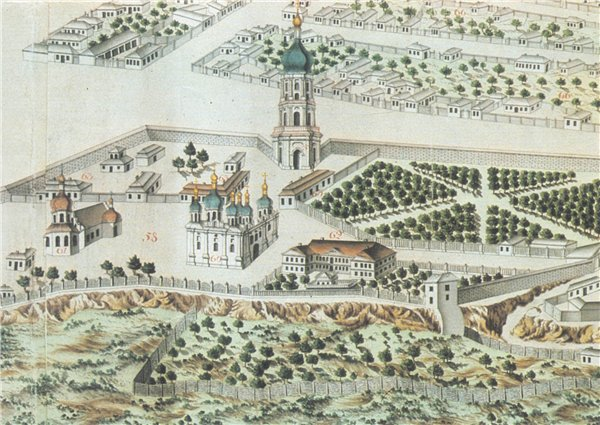
Pustyno-Mykilsky Monastery, 18th century

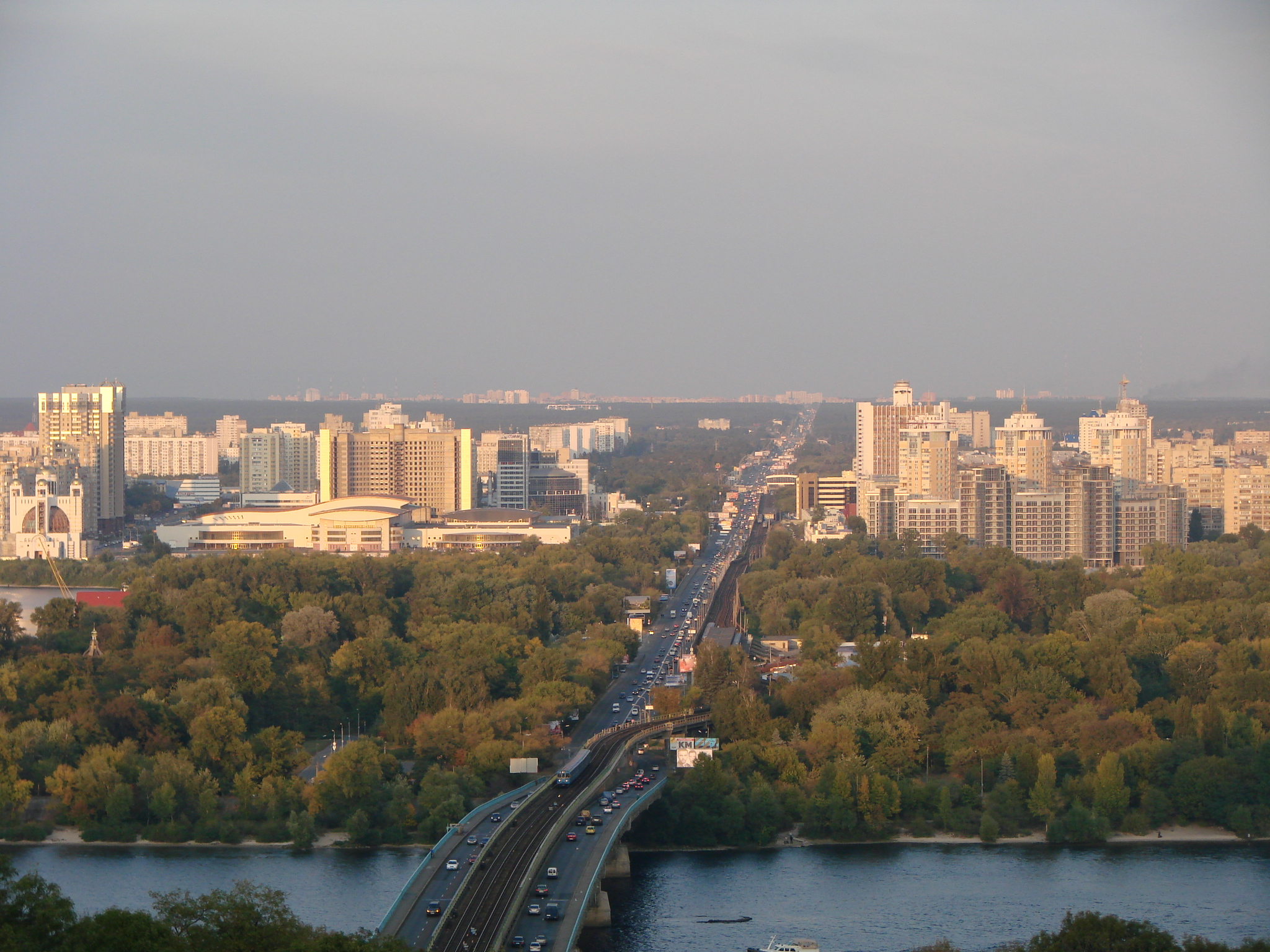
View of the territory of the Mykilska Slobidka today, as seen from the city's right bank

The Mykilska Slobidka (Ukrainian: Микільська слобідка; Russian: Никольская слободка, Nicholas village) was a former sloboda (settlement) located on the left-bank of Dnieper and outskirts of Bykivnia Forest. It was connected with Kyiv by Nicholas Chain Bridge. Today, the settlement is now part of Livoberezhnyi Masyv of the Dnipro Raion (district) of Kyiv.

== History ==
In the 18th century, the remains of the Mesolithic Dnieper–Donets culture were found on the territory of the Mykilska Slobidka. In 1508, the territory belonged to the Pustyno-Mykilskyi Monastery, from which the settlement received its name.

In the 18th century, the settlement was inhabited by the Kyiv Arsenal workers. From 1802 to 1902, the settlement was part of the Brovary Volost. In 1858, the settlement consisted of 76 residences, 350 residents, and the St. Nicholas Church. Famed Russian poets Anna Akhmatova and Nikolay Gumilev were married in this church in 1910. The settlement had a small lake named Sviatysche located to its north, and a small settlement exclave named Buhry to the lake's north.

From 1903 to 1923, the settlement was the administrative center of the Mykilsko-Slobidska Volost, in the Oster Povit of the Chernihiv Governorate. In the early 1910s, the settlement was home to the city's tram depot, located in between three tram routes which ran through the settlement. It is particularly notable since the city's two banks were then administratively part of other governorates (Kyiv and Chernihiv, respectively).

When Kiev's city limits were expanded to the left bank in 1923, the settlement became a part of the city. In the 1930s, Soviet authorities closed the functioning church and monastery down, and repressed the local archimandrite. In 1935, the monastery and belltower were demolished, and a new park and street were built in its place. During the 1960s to 1970s, the territory of the Mykilska Slobidka was demolished to make way for the Livoberezhnyi neighborhood; nothing remains of the original settlement except for one pre-revolutionary building.

== See also ==
- Sloboda Ukraine
