= Livoberezhna (Kyiv Metro) =

Kyiv Metro Station

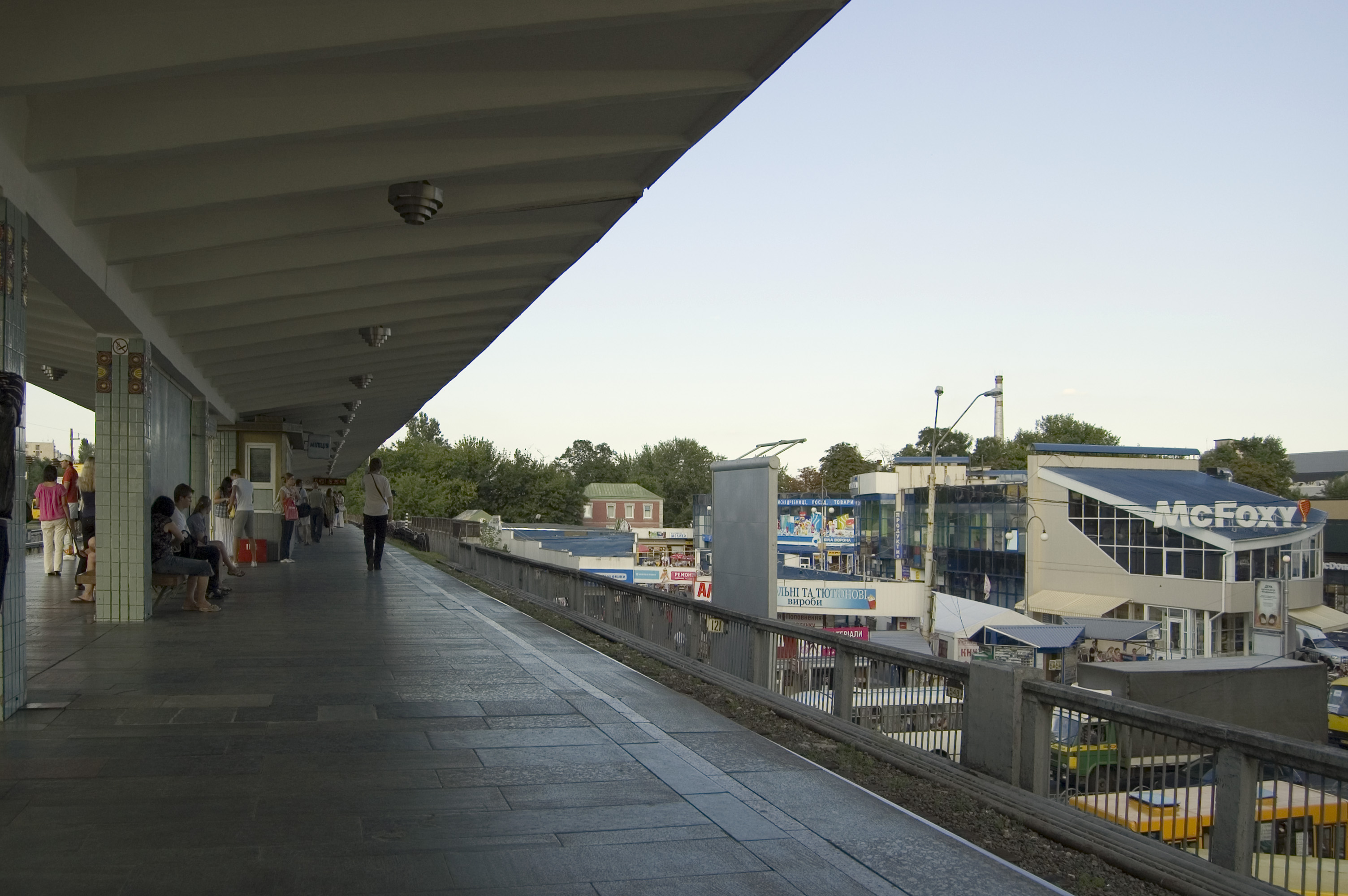
- Station platform

General information
- Location: Dniprovskyi District; Kyiv; Ukraine
- Coordinates: 50°27′07″N 30°35′54″E
- System: Kyiv Metro station
- Owner: Kyiv Metro
- Line: Sviatoshynsko–Brovarska line
- Platforms: 1
- Tracks: 2

Construction
- Structure type: bridge
- Platform levels: 1

Other information
- Station code: 124

History
- Opened: 5 November 1965

Services
Preceding station	Kyiv Metro	Following station
Hidropark towards Akademmistechko	Sviatoshynsko–Brovarska line	Darnytsia towards Lisova
Location

Livoberezhna (Ukrainian: Лівобережна,) is a station on the Sviatoshynsko-Brovarska Line of the Kyiv Metro system that serves Kyiv, the capital of Ukraine.The station was opened on 5 November 1965, as part of the eastward expansion of the Brovary radius and is the first one to be fully on the left bank of the Dnieper River (hence its name).

The station is situated at a junction between the Brovary Avenue and the Rayisa Okipna Street, and is actually above ground level with the platform being on the flyover. Two vestibules are on ground level with exits on the southern side of the station. Thereby passengers have to ascend to reach the Metro.

Designed by architects I. Maslenkov, and V. Bogdanovsky, the station features a standard Kyivan surface level design that is almost identical to both of its neighbours and is fully reminiscent of the 1960s policy on Soviet public architecture—a single platform with one hinged concrete roof supported by light blue tiled pillars, with decorative flower ceramics at the top.

The station serves the Livoberezhna microdistrict, as well as many of the northern adjacent districts, commuters from which use urban transport to arrive.

== Eurovision Song Contest 2017 ==
On 17 February 2017, one of the entrances to the station was temporarily closed for repairs and to make the station look aesthetically pleasing for the 2017 Eurovision Song Contest, which took place in Kyiv. On 23 March, the renovated eastern vestibule was opened, which was radically different from the earlier sketches. Many Kyivans were dissatisfied with the repairs carried out. The finally restored station was opened on 5 May.

== Gallery ==
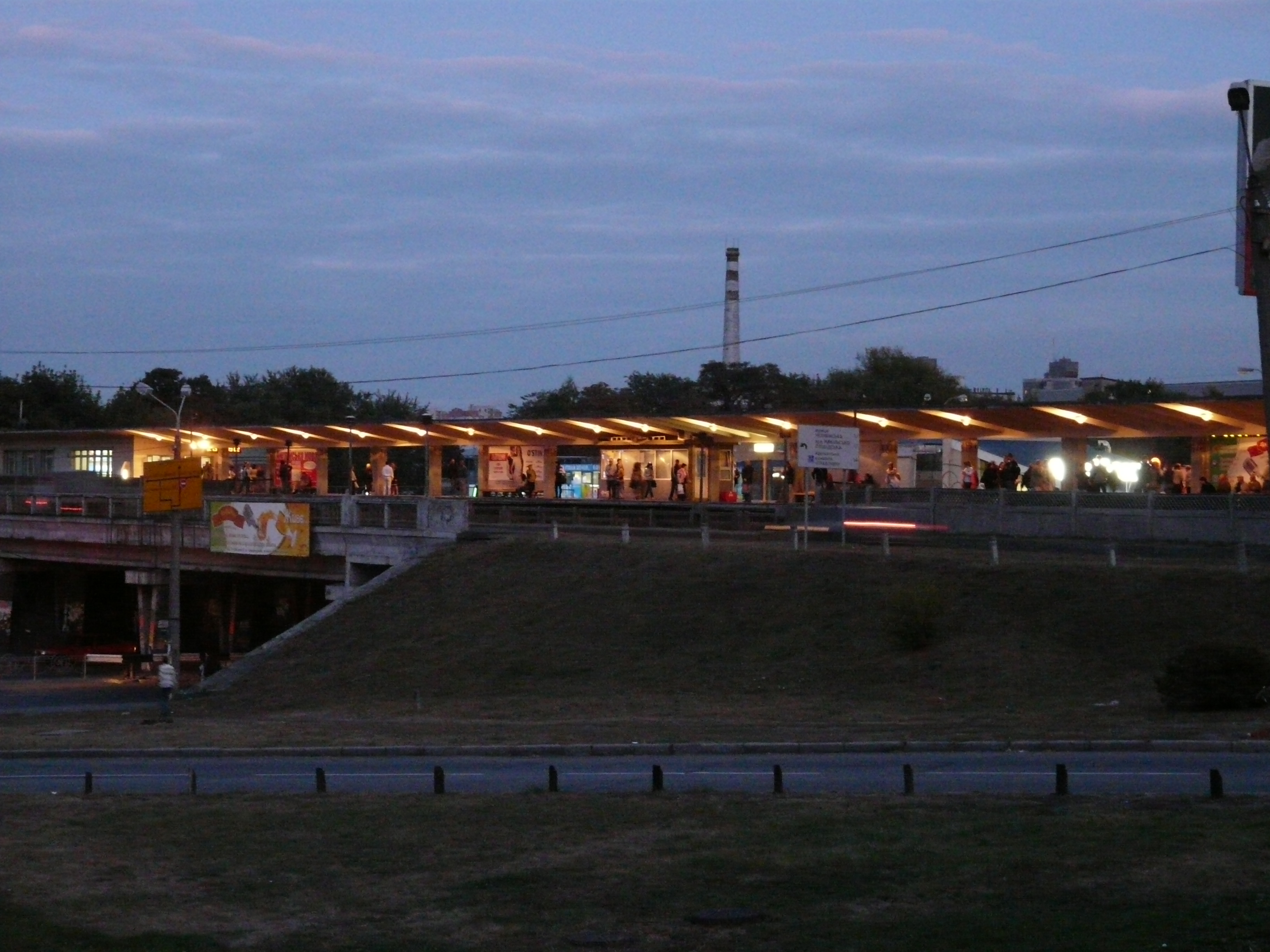

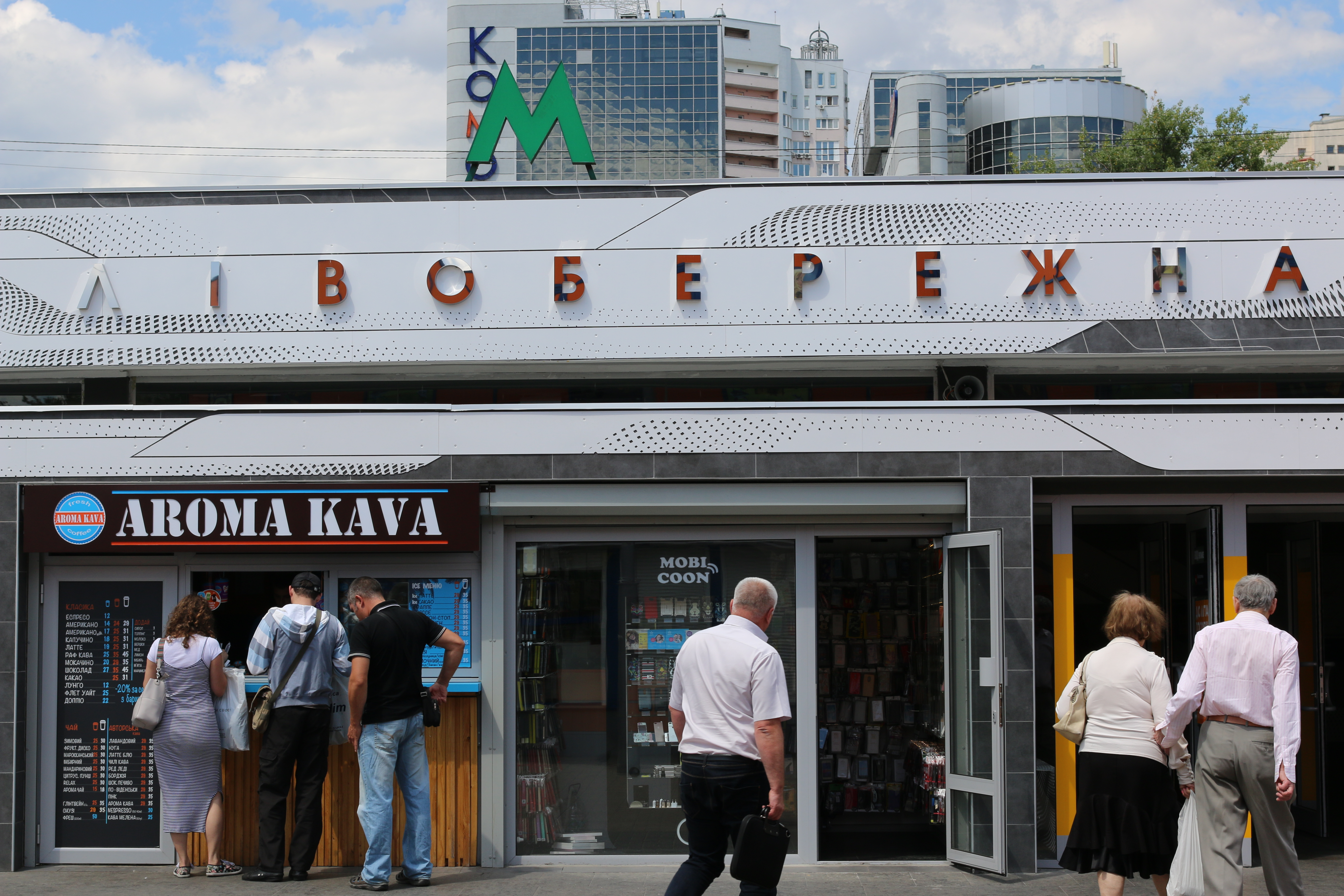
One of the entrances to the station

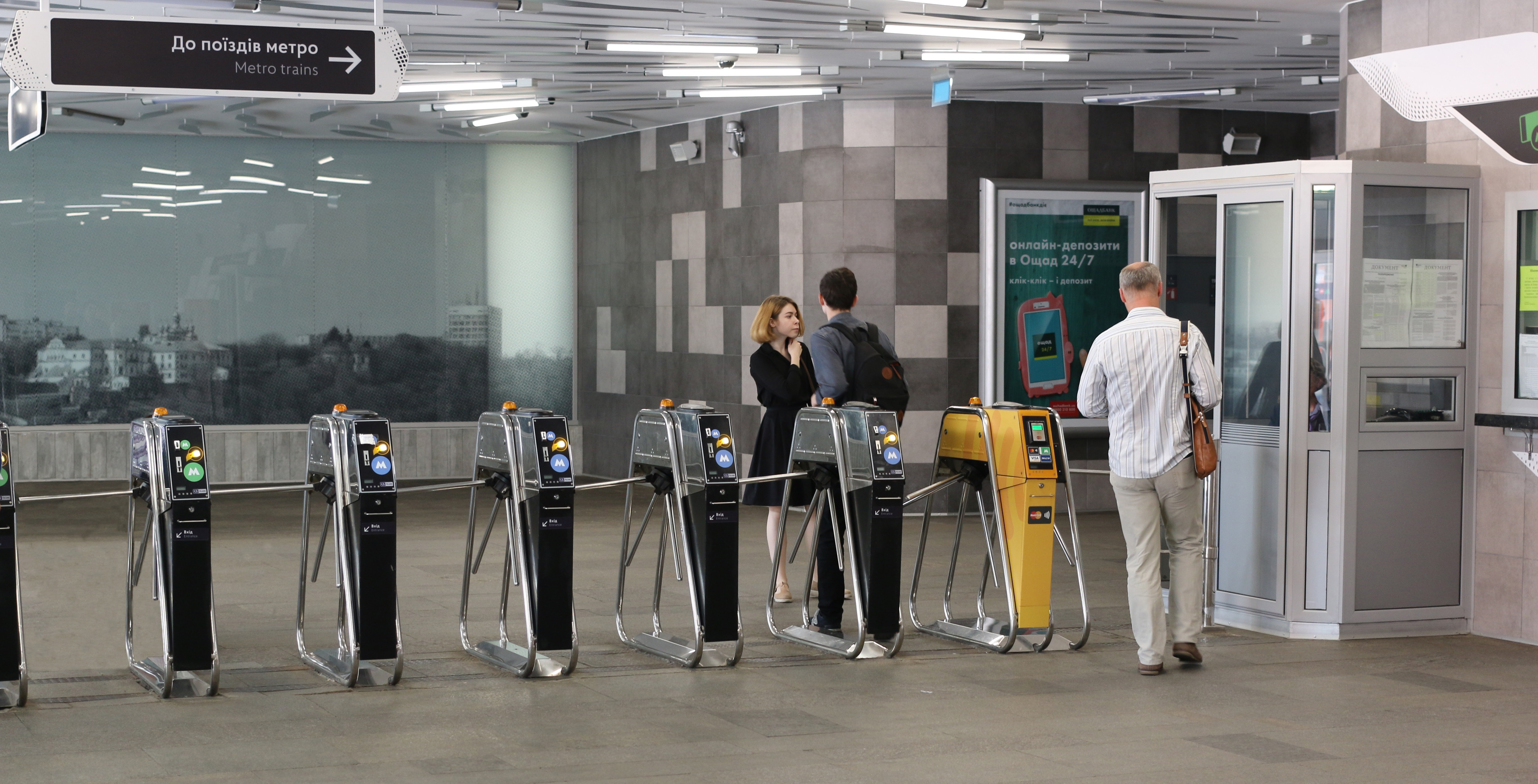
Vestibule

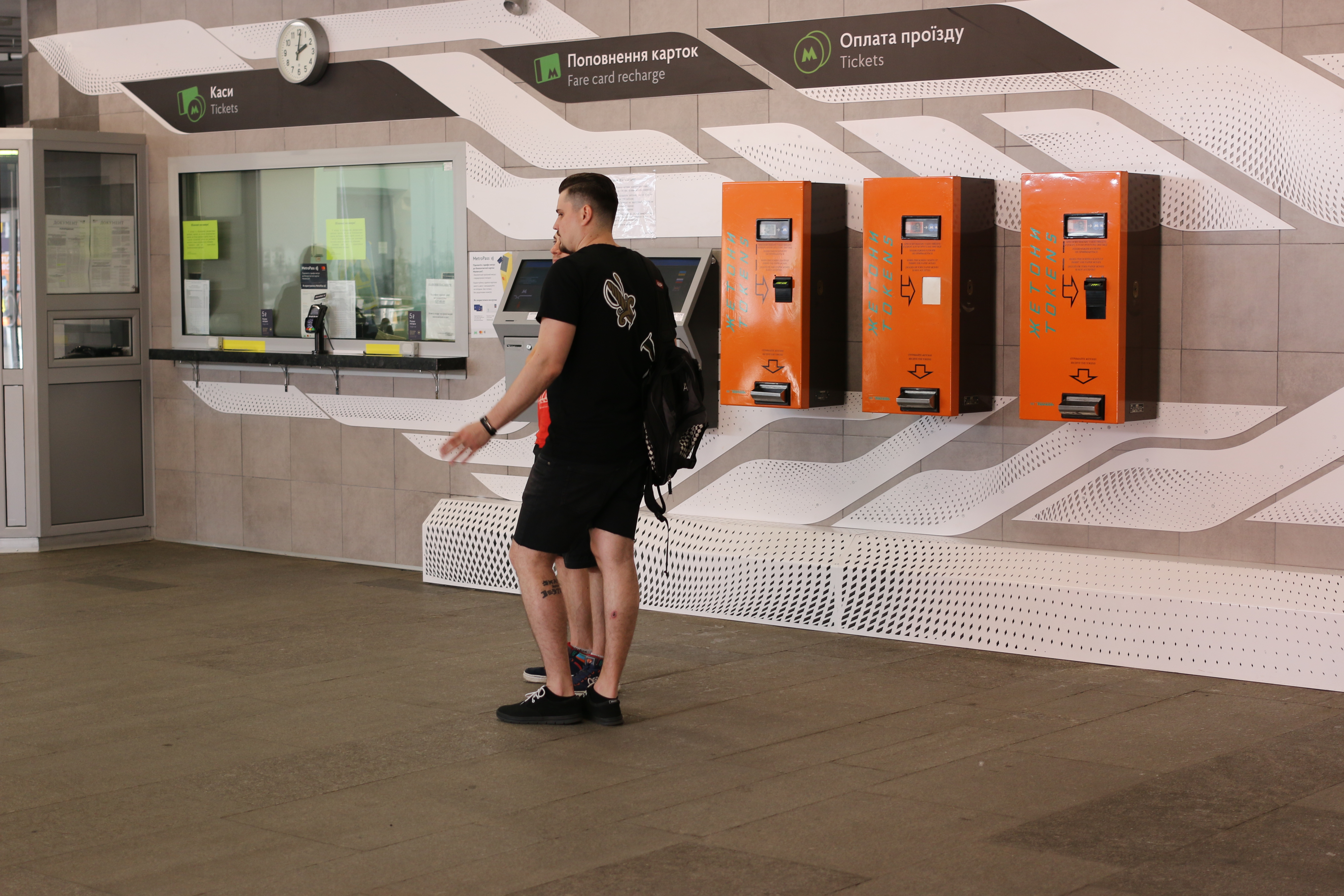
Ticket windows

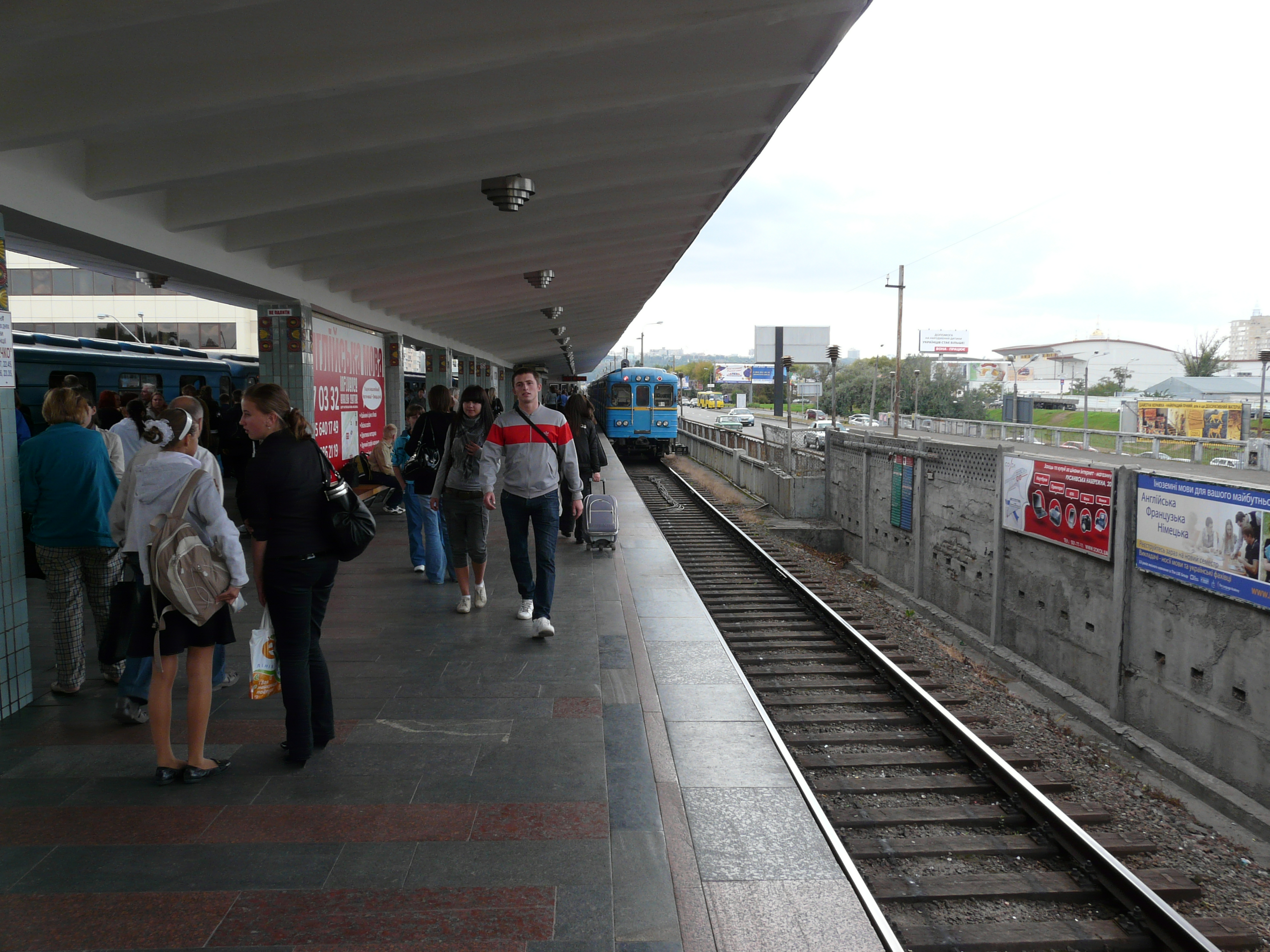
Station platform

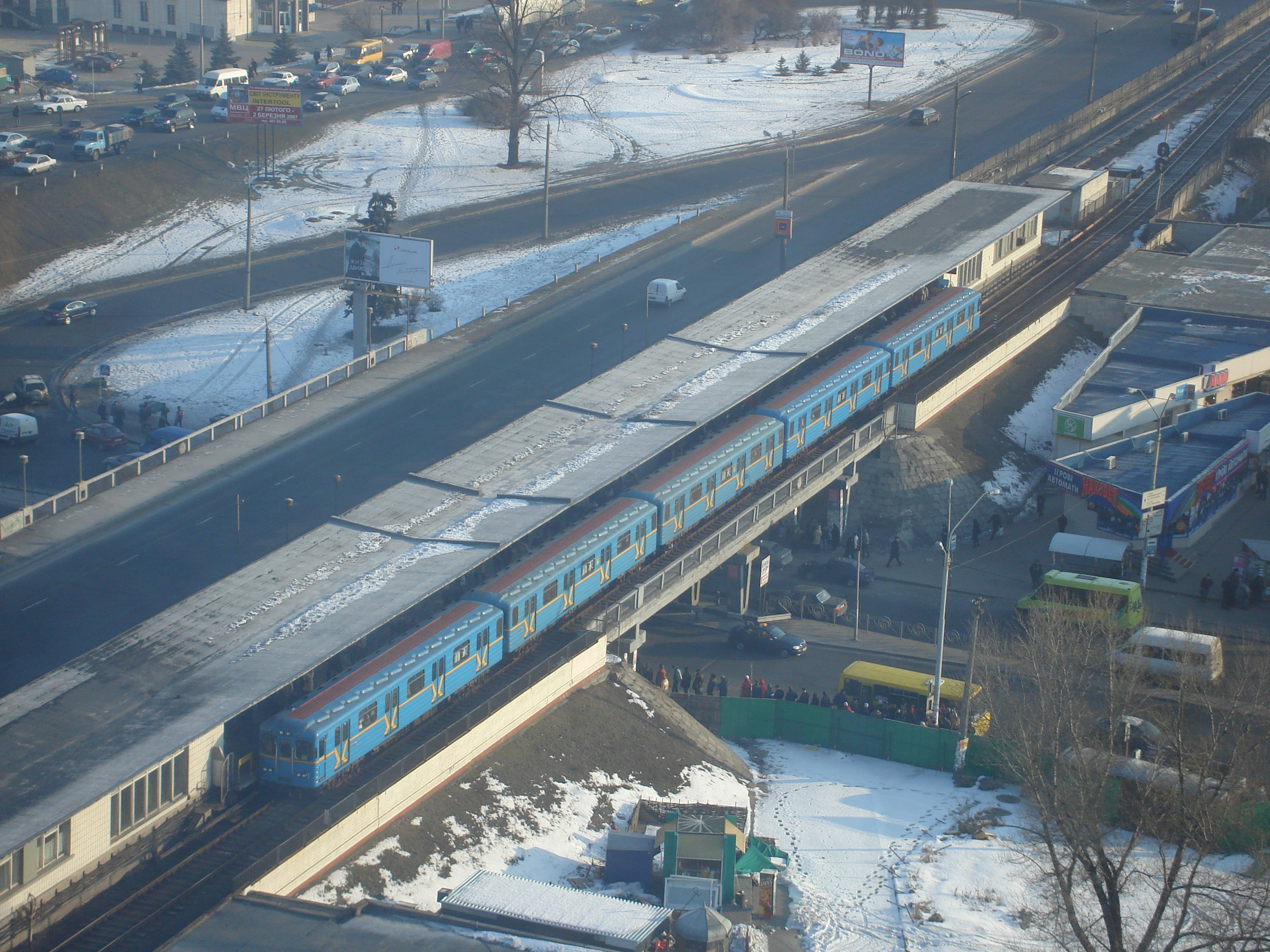
The Livoberezhna as seen from a nearby hotel

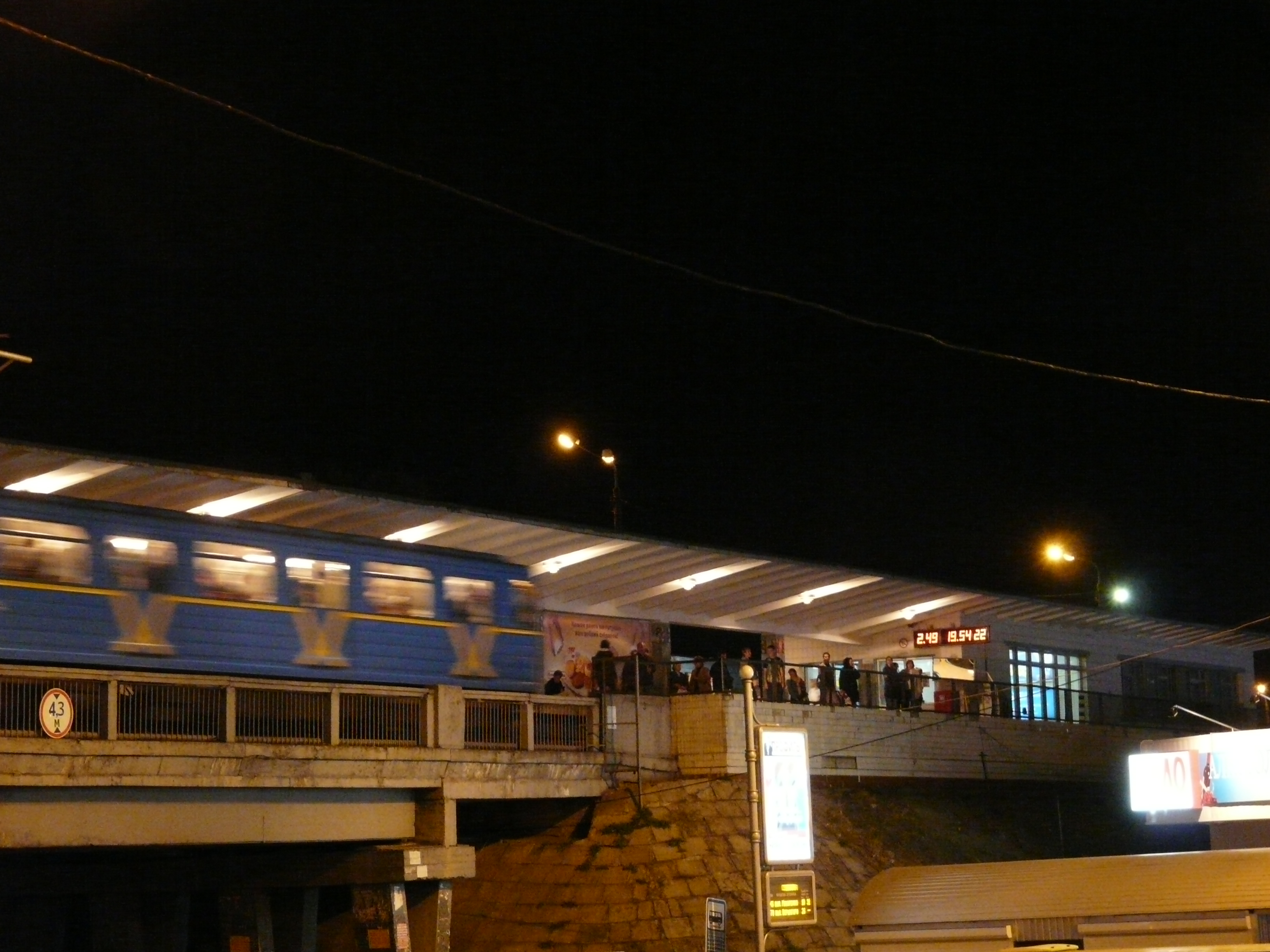
