= Poshtova Ploshcha (Kyiv Metro) =

Kyiv Metro Station

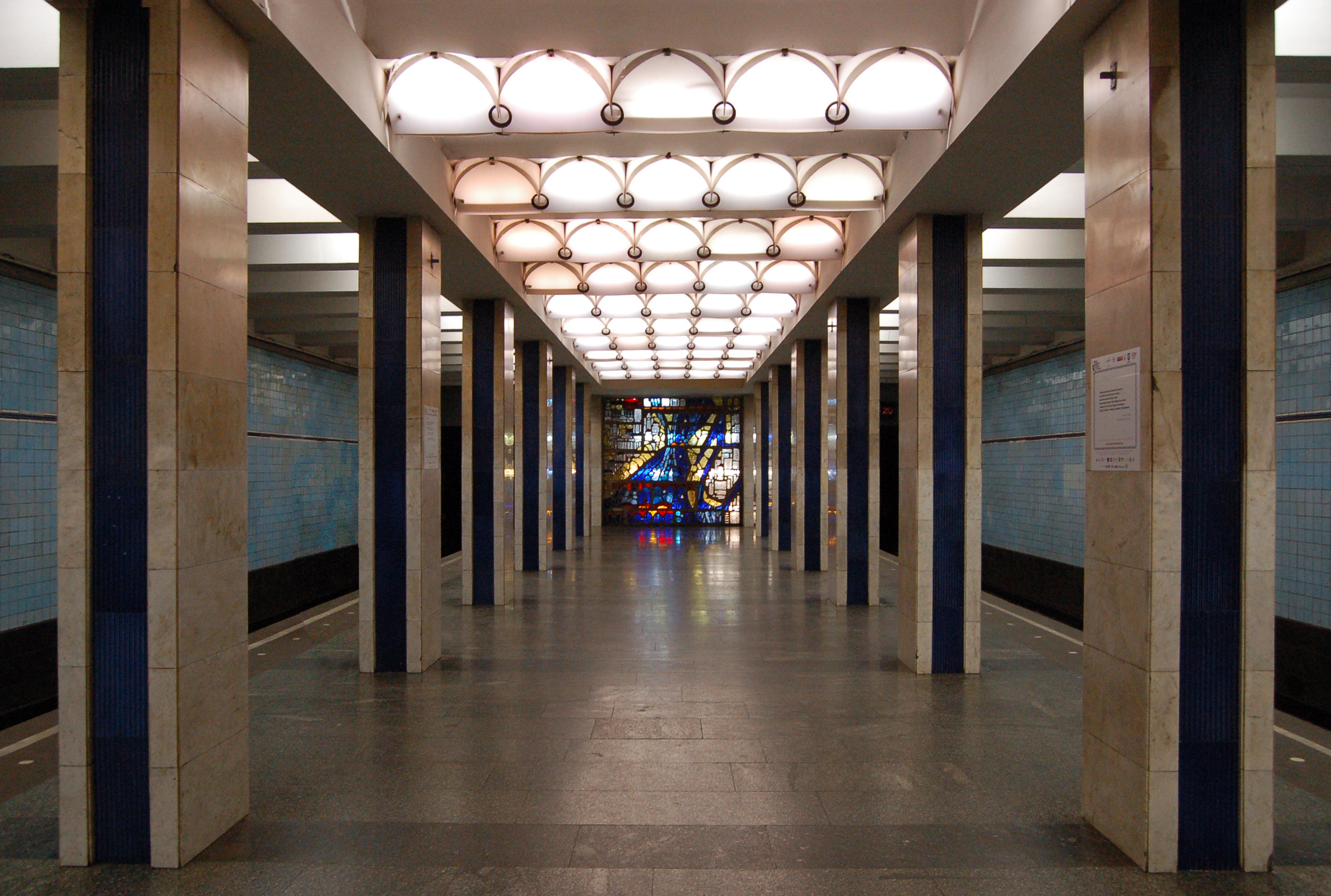
- The Station Hall

General information
- Location: Podilskyi District; Kyiv; Ukraine
- Coordinates: 50°27′33″N 30°31′30″E
- System: Kyiv Metro station
- Owner: Kyiv Metro
- Line: Obolonsko–Teremkivska line
- Platforms: 1
- Tracks: 2

Construction
- Structure type: underground
- Platform levels: 1

Other information
- Station code: 216

History
- Opened: 17 December 1976

Services
Preceding station	Kyiv Metro	Following station
Kontraktova Ploshcha towards Heroiv Dnipra	Obolonsko–Teremkivska line	Maidan Nezalezhnosti towards Teremky
Location

Poshtova Ploshcha (Ukrainian: Поштова площа, pronounced [poʃˈtɔwɐ ˈplɔʃtʃɐ]) is a station on Kyiv Metro's Obolonsko–Teremkivska Line in Kyiv, the capital of Ukraine. The station was opened on 17 December 1976, and is named after Kyiv's Poshtova Square (Post Square) near the Dnieper's embankment in the historic Podil neighbourhood. It was designed by A.S. Krushynskyi, T.A. Tselykovska, I.L. Maslenkov, and V.S. Bohdanovskyi.

The station is located shallow underground and consists of a central hall with columns. At the end of the station's hall, there is a stained glass decorative window. The station is accessible by passenger tunnels leading from the Saint Volodymyr Descent and the Poshtova Square. Near the station, the Kyiv Funicular is located, providing a main access to the station from the central part of Kyiv.
