= Postal Square =

Historic square in Kyiv, Ukraine

Coordinates: 50°27′32.5″N 30°31′34.7″E

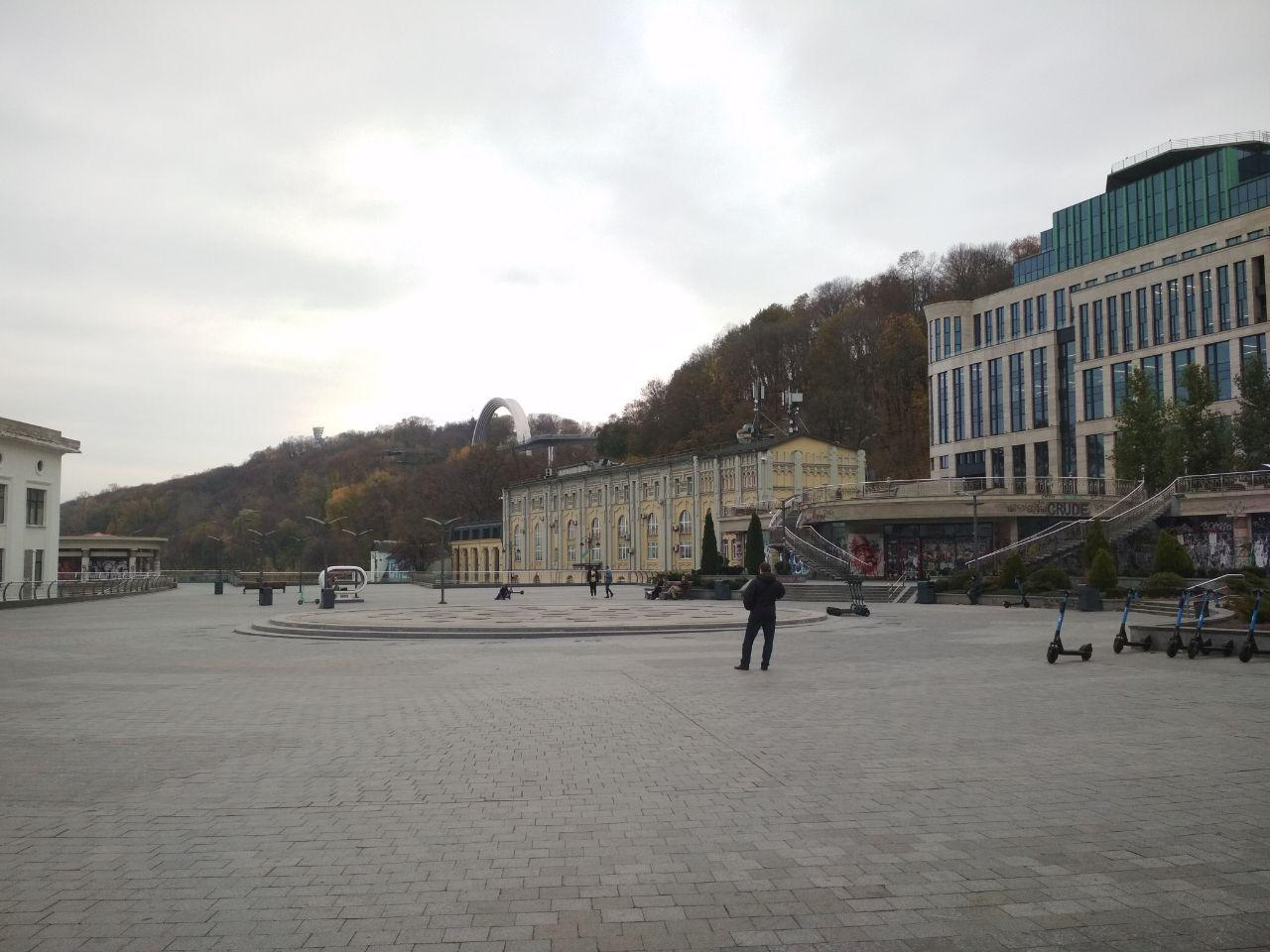
- Postal Square, October 2021, southeastward view with the Arch of Freedom of the Ukrainian People in the background.
- Native name: Депутатська вулиця (Ukrainian)
- Type: square
- Location: Podilskyi District; Kyiv, Ukraine
- Postal code: 04070

Poshtova Square (Ukrainian: Поштова площа, romanized: Poshtova Ploshcha, pronounced [poʃˈtɔwɐ ˈplɔʃtʃɐ], lit. 'Postal Square') is one of the oldest historic squares of Kyiv, the capital of Ukraine. Archaeological findings are dated back to the 4th century.

== History ==
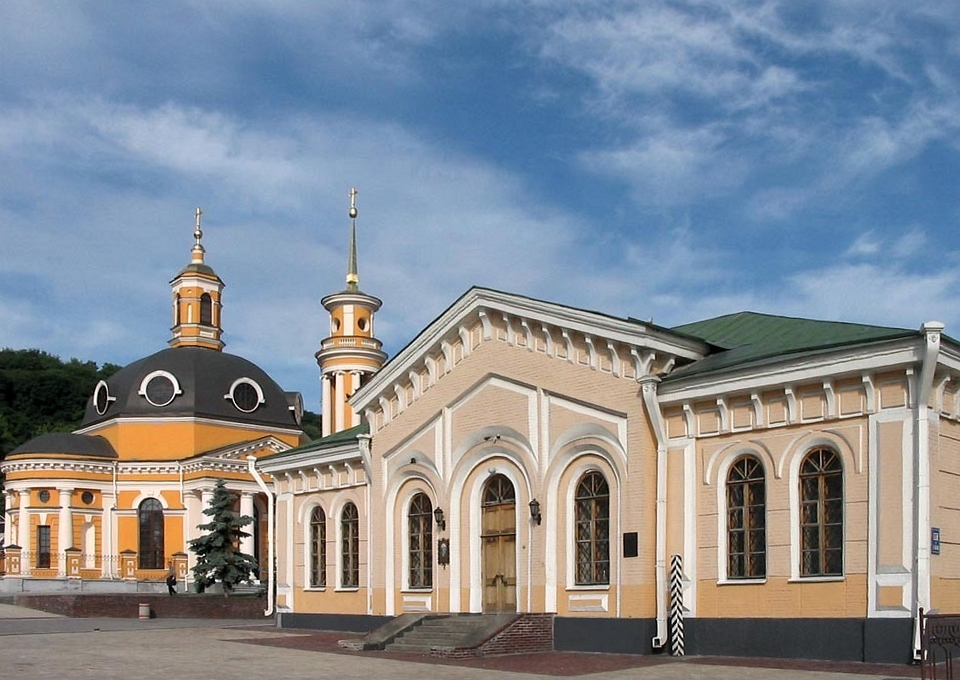
Northwestward view of Poshtova Square with the Post Office building and the Church of Nativity (2005)

The square is located at the Dnipro riverfront right next to the Kyiv River Port. It is a crossing of several historic streets such as Saint Volodymyr Descent, Borychiv Descent and Sahaydachny Street.

The square received its name from Podil post station that was opened there in 1846. The square was also known under an alternative name as the Nativity Square (Ukrainian: площа Різдва, romanized: ploshcha Rizdva), from the Nativity Church (built in 1810–1814, destroyed by Soviets in 1936 and rebuilt in 2004). The square underwent significant reconstruction in the 1970s when the Kurenivsko-Chervonoarmiyska (today Obolonsko–Teremkivska Metro line) was built and only the post station was preserved. Currently, the post station is used as a small art gallery.

In the mid-2010s, a new automobile tunnel was constructed under the square. During the excavations, many archaeologically valuable artefacts dating back to Kyivan Rus' times were found. Since 2018, the square has been a protected heritage site, and is planned to hold at some point in the future a museum dedicated to medieval Kyiv.

== Public transport ==
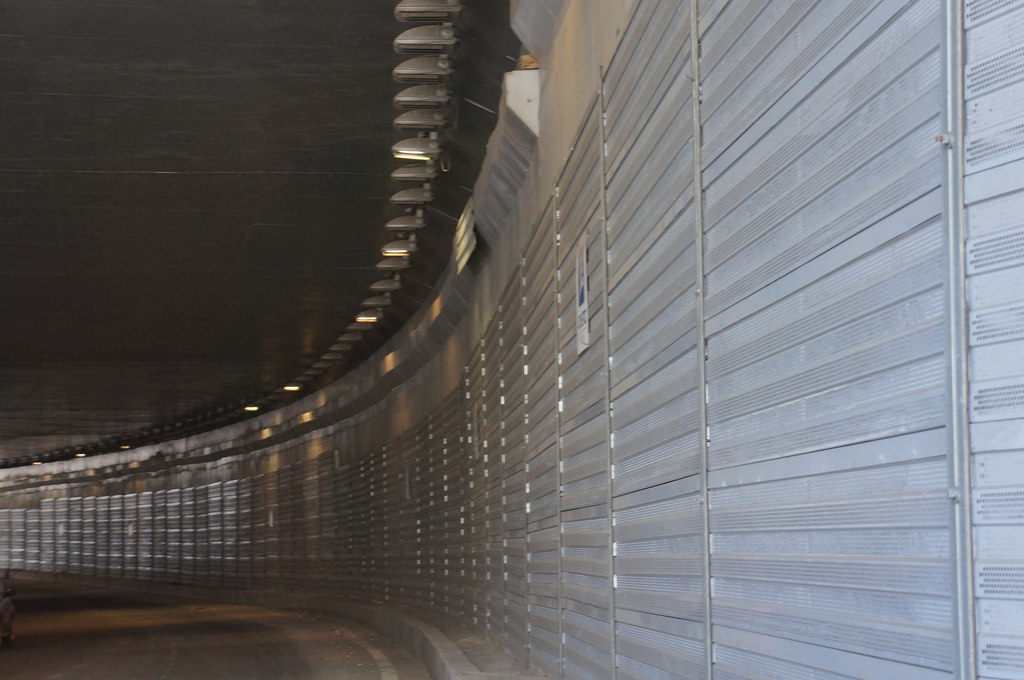
New automobile tunnel under Poshtova Square (2015)

The square is served by the metro (the Poshtova Ploshcha station), the funicular, and buses.

The Kyiv tram has had historically significant routes through the square in past, however, on February 23, 2011, the last tram service through the square (line 5) was closed, without any clear plans for reopening in future.
