= Podilskyi District =

Coordinates: 50°28′03″N 30°30′52″E

Podilskyi District Подільський район
- Urban district in Kyiv
- Flag Coat of arms

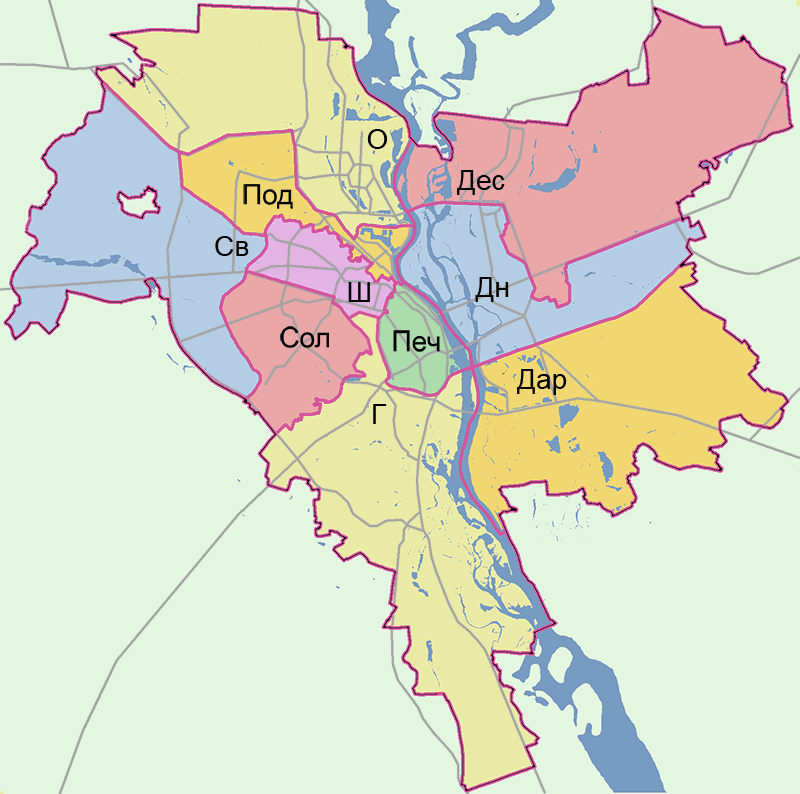
- Country: Ukraine
- City: Kyiv
- Established: 1921

Government

Area
  - Total: 34.04 km^{2} (13.14 sq mi)

Population (2001)
  - Total: 177,563
  - Density: 5,216/km^{2} (13,510/sq mi)
- Time zone: UTC+2 (EET)
  - Summer (DST): UTC+3 (EEST)
- Area code: 380-44
- Website: podil.kyivcity.gov.ua

The Podilskyi District (Note: Ukrainian: Подільський район, romanized: Podilskyi raion) is an urban district of Kyiv, the capital of Ukraine. Its population was 177,563 at the 2001 census. The district takes its name from the historic Podil neighborhood which it includes within its boundaries.

The Podilskyi District as an administrative entity was formed in 1921 on one of the largest historical neighborhoods in Kyiv. In May 2001 the Podilskyi District celebrated the 80th anniversary of its foundation. The district remains one of the main business, transport, and industrial areas of Kyiv.

There are currently 50 large industrial organizations based here. Although most of the industrial sites are phased out of the region, they dominate the adjacent neighborhoods to the north, named today "Podilsko-Kurenivskiy promraion".

== Population ==
=== Language ===
Distribution of the population by native language according to the 2001 census:

Language	Number	Percentage
Ukrainian	131 287	73.94%
Russian	44 446	25.03%
Other (Note: Those who did not indicate their native language or indicated a language that was native to less than 1% of the local population.)	1 830	1.03%
Total	177 563	100.00%

== Neighborhoods ==
The Podilskyi District includes the following historical neighborhoods of Kyiv within its boundaries:

- Podil
- Vynohradar
- Kurenivka
- Petrivka (Pochaina)
- Nyvky
- Rybalskyi Peninsula
- Mostytskyi Masyv

== Transport ==
The Podilskyi District is connected to the city's metro system by three stations on the Obolonsko–Teremkivska Line: Tarasa Shevchenka, Kontraktova Ploshcha (named after Kontraktova (Contracts) Square), and Poshtova Ploshcha (named after Poshtova (Postal) Square).

== Tourist attractions ==
- Ukrainian National Chernobyl Museum - museum dedicated to the Chernobyl disaster
- National Museum of the History of Ukraine - museum dedicated to the History of Ukraine

== Universities ==
- National University of Kyiv-Mohyla Academy
