= Podil =

Neighborhood in Kyiv

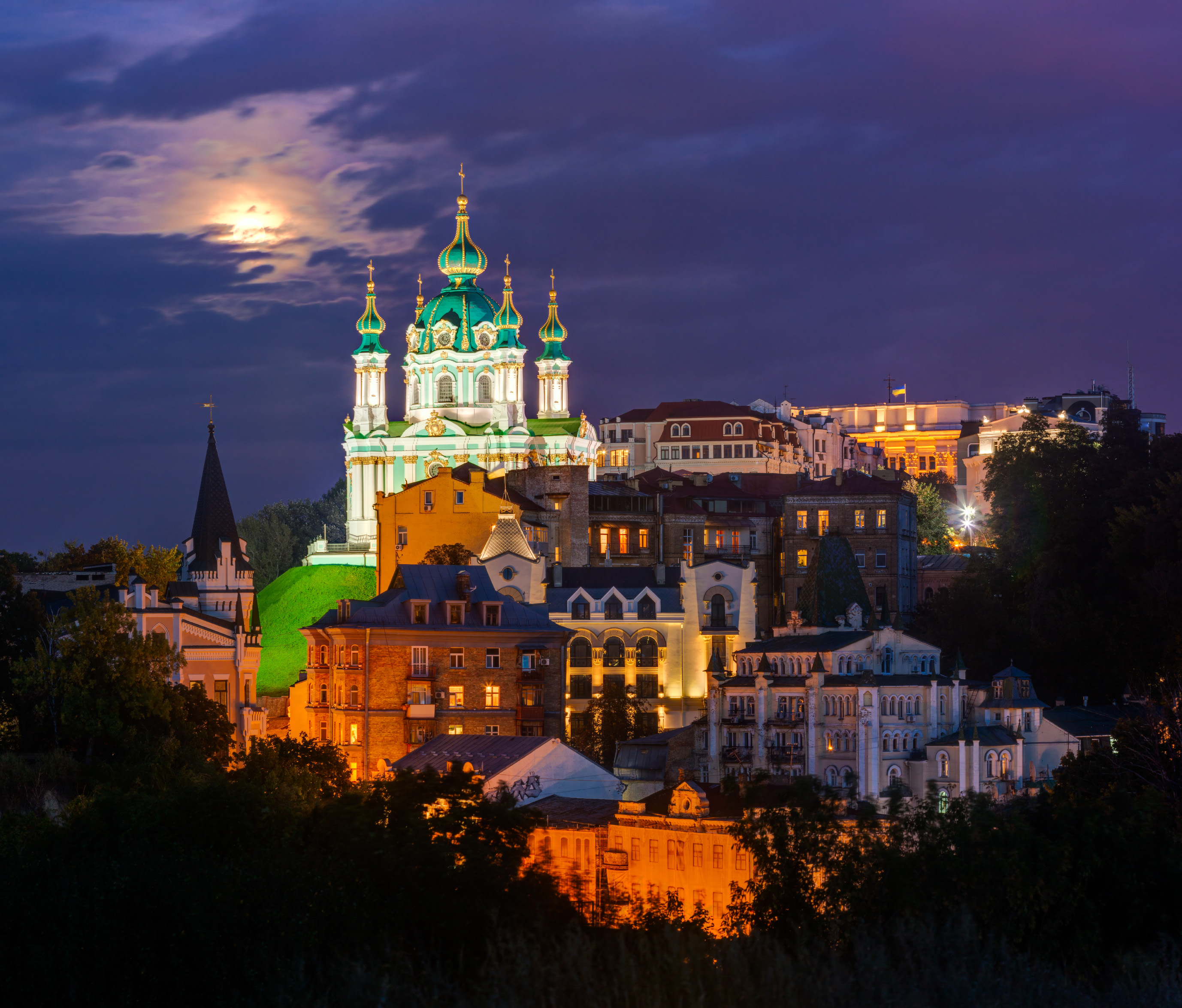
General view of Andrew's Descent with the Saint Andrew's Church in the background.

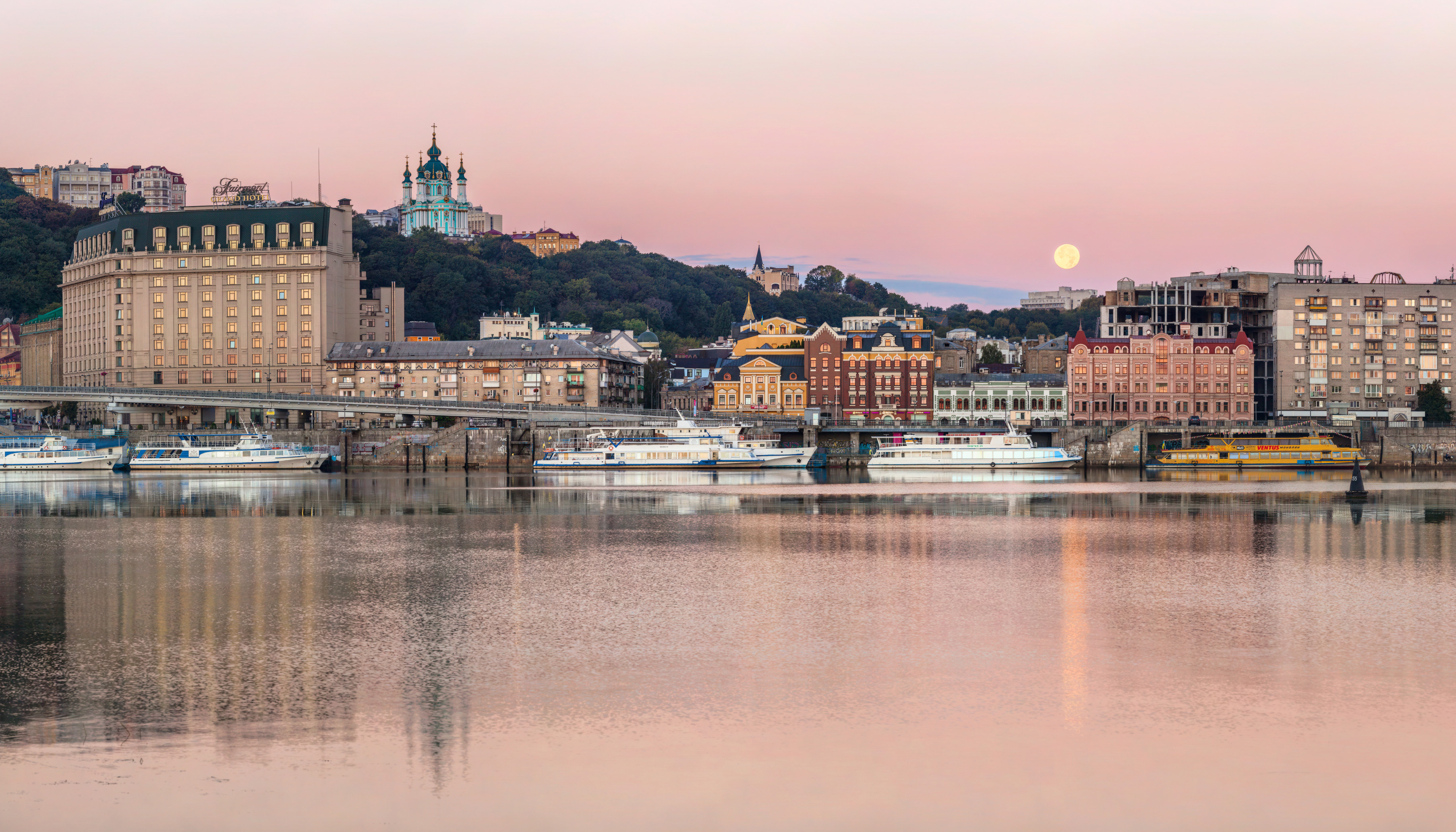
A view of the modern Podil neighborhood, in a center is a river port in front of the Fairmont Grand Hotel

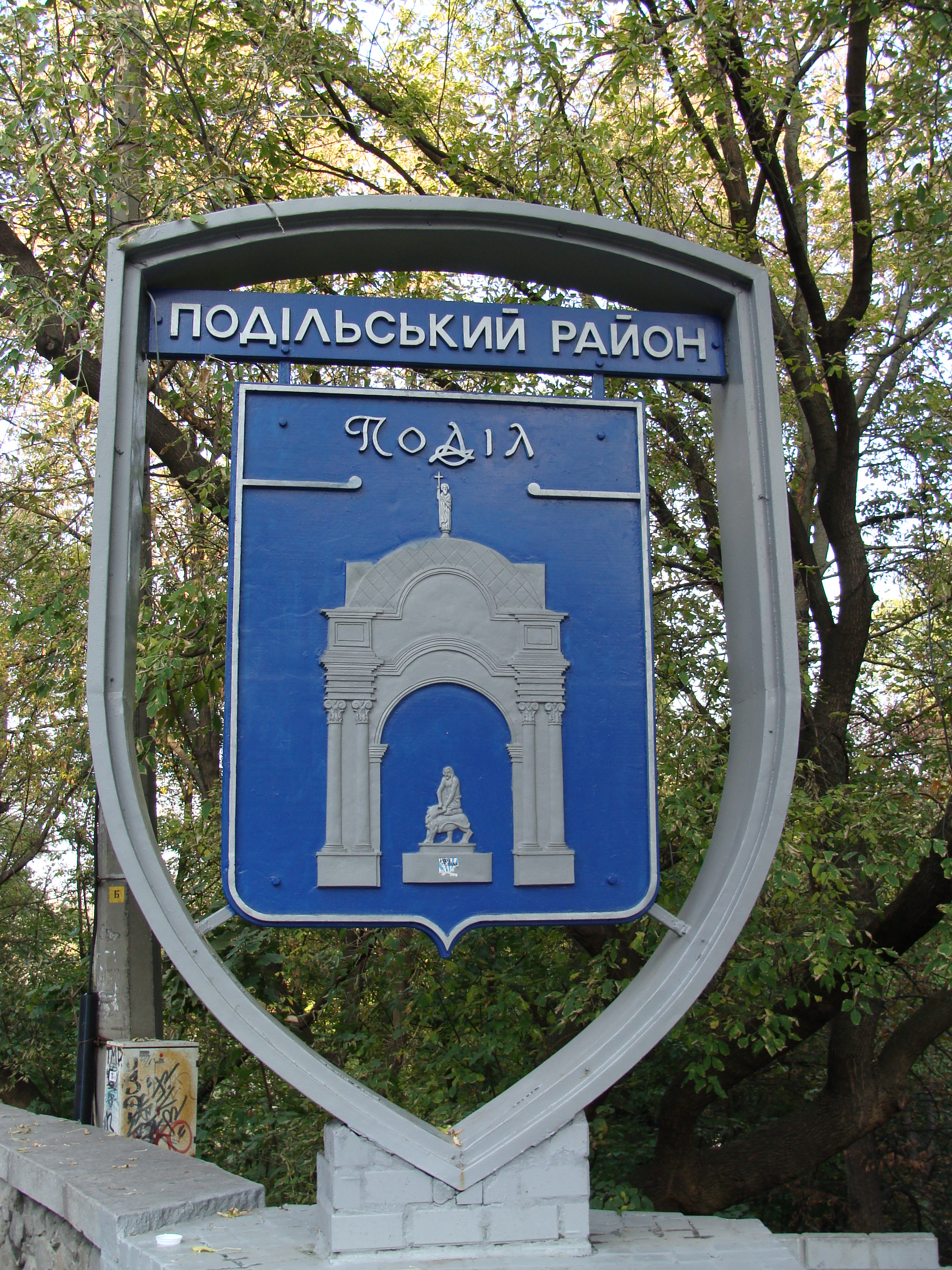
Welcome sign of the Podilskyi District (not the coat of arms) with the Fountain of Samson as its centerpiece

Podil (Ukrainian: Поділ [poˈd⁽ʲ⁾il]) or Podol (Russian: Подол [pɐˈdol]), also known in English as the Lower City, is a historic neighborhood in Kyiv, the capital of Ukraine. It is located on a floodplain terrace over the Dnieper between the Kyiv Hills and the lower stream of Pochaina River. Podil is one of the oldest neighborhoods of Kyiv, and the birthplace of the city's trade, commerce and industry. After the Mongol invasion of Rus' and destruction of Kyiv, it served as a city center until the 19th century. Here the city administration (magistrate) and the main university were located, and later the city's port and shipyard were established here.

Podil contains many architectural and historical landmarks, and new archaeological sites are still being revealed. It is a part of the city's larger administrative Podilskyi District.

== History ==
=== Antiquity and Medieval era ===
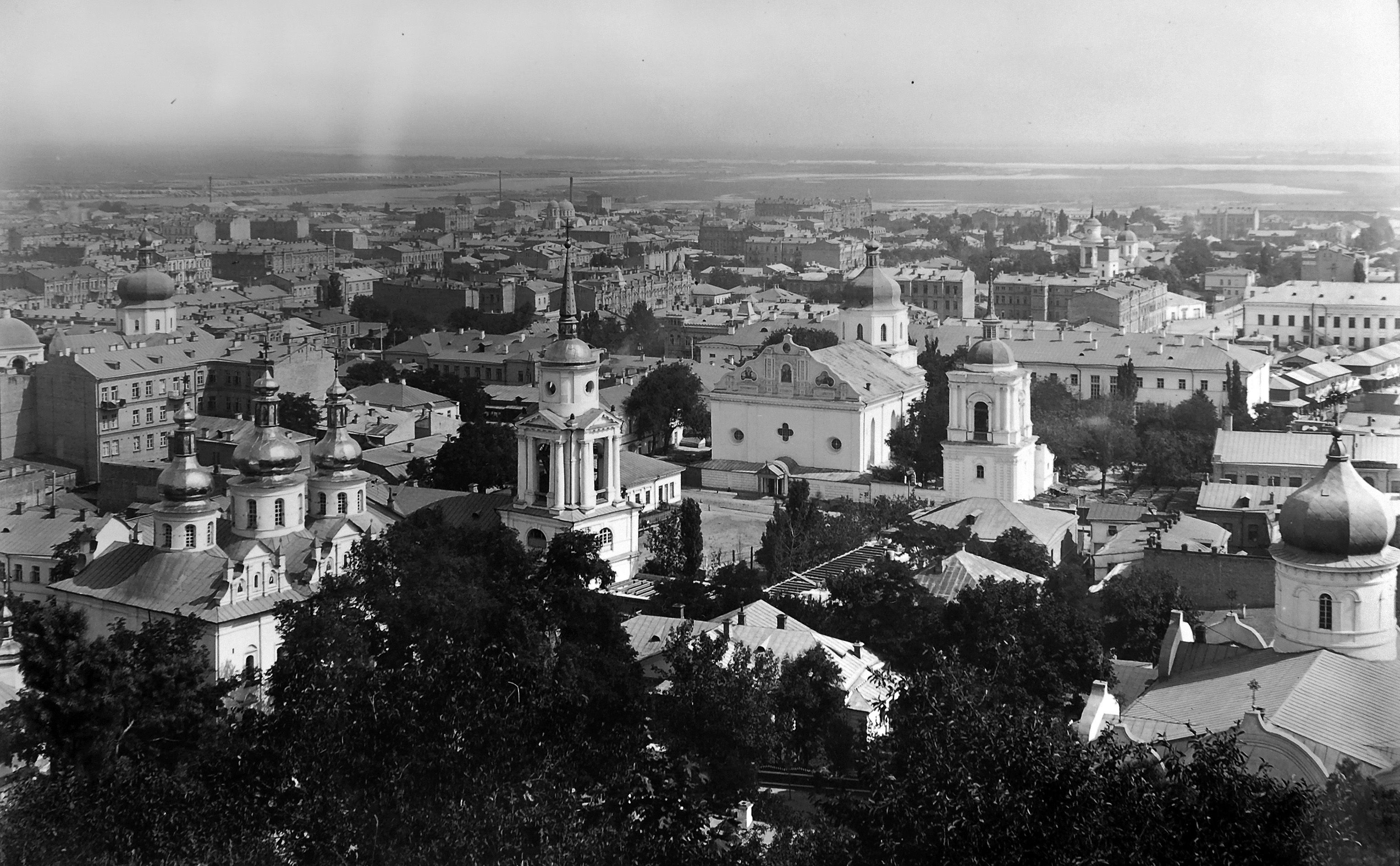
View of the Podil in the late 19th century.

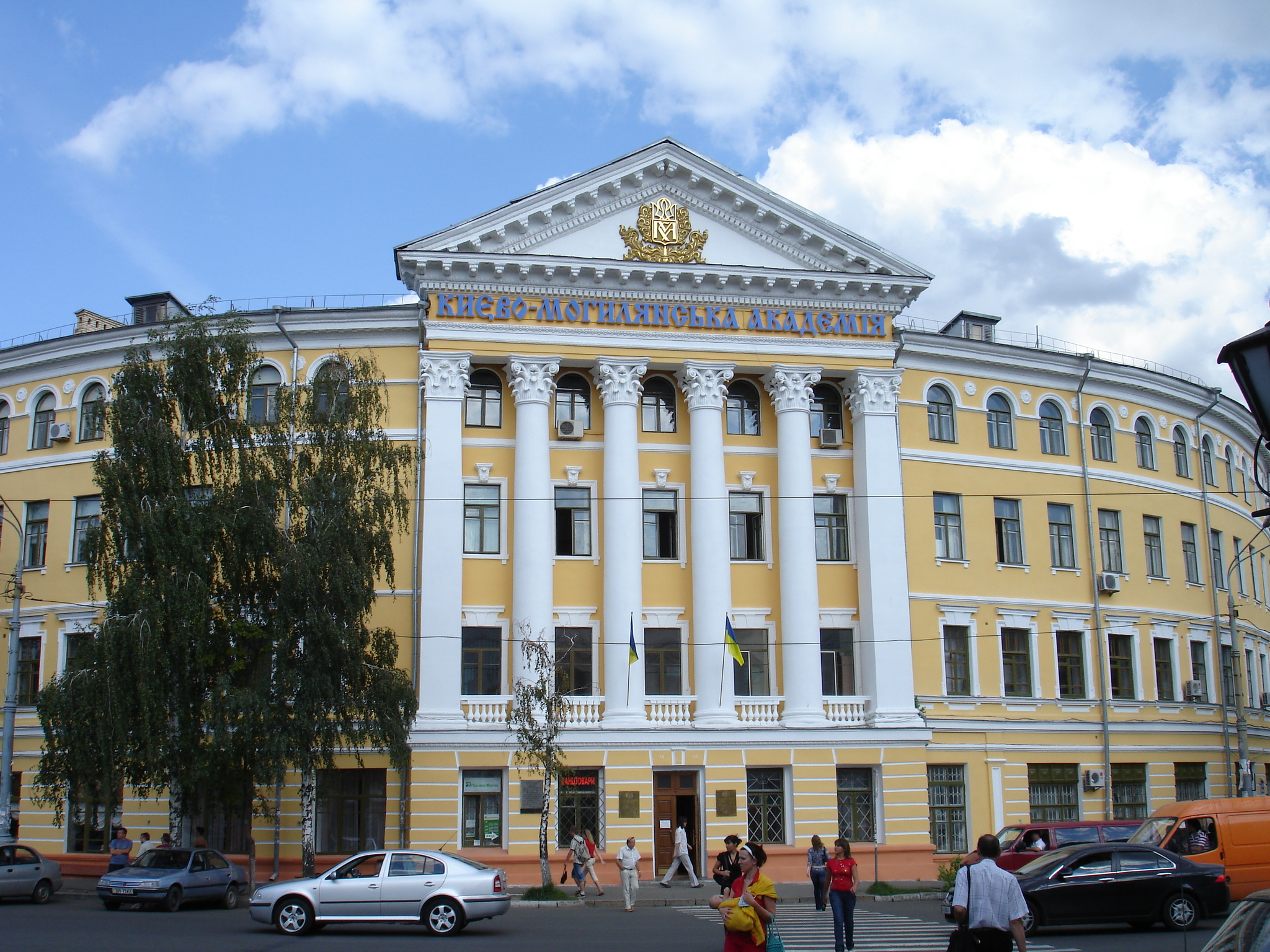
Kyiv Mohyla Academy façade

The name “Podil” means something that is situated downwards. This area used to be the trading and crafting center of Kyiv. The names of some Podil neighborhoods reflect this fact: "Dehtyari" (those who work with tar), "Honchari" (potters), "Kozhemyaki" (craftsmen working with leather). On the territory of Podil ancient constructions were found. Some of them date back to the first half of the first millennium BC. It is first mentioned, however, in chronicles around 945. At times of Ancient Rus, Podil served as the main city's posad which was connected with the Upper city (Old Kyiv Hill) by Borychiv Descent. According to archaeological data, Podil appeared at the end of the 9th century. In 12-13th centuries its total area was reaching 200 ha (490 acres). In documentary sources there is mention of "Stolpiye" (wooden fortifications) that protected Podil from northwest, Fairgrounds (later Zhytniy Fairgrounds, main city market), Church of Saint Elijah (the oldest Christian temple mentioned in 945), and Pyrohoshcha Church. Probably, the legendary churches of Turov and Novgorod also existed at Podil. The Soviet "Outline of Ancient History of the Ukrainian SSR" of 1957 (Ukrainian: Нариси стародавньої історії УРСР) mentions that the Novgorod traders had own church in Kyiv. The Pochaina River served the city's harbour.

Podil has accumulated a cultural layer built up of 6–12 metres (20–39 feet) saturated with a great abundance of artefacts of 9–18th centuries. Its uniqueness consists of the fact that in its lower strata due to high soil moisture are well-preserved objects of organic matter such as wooden structures. There were researched residential and commercial buildings (predominantly above-ground blockhouses), craftsman shops, port warehouses, burial grounds, segments of streets. There were discovered remnants of five masonry temples of the 12th century. It was established that Podil had built-up manors with consistent courtyard limits. Each resident's manor that had area of 300–400 m^{2} (3,200–4,300 sq ft) consisted of 2-3 buildings.

=== Early Modern era ===
After the Mongol invasion of Rus' and destruction of Kyiv, Podil transformed into the main and the most populated part of the city. However, the area of Podil shrank, in 16-17th centuries its northwestern border served the Hlybochytsia River that used to drain into Pochaina (today Hlybochytsia in the underground collector).

Upon obtaining its Magdeburg rights in the 15th century, in Kyiv was built a rathaus, later Kyiv magistrate. The center of Podil became the market square later known as Mahistratska and Konstraktova where stood a rathaus and the city's cathedral Pyrohoshcha Church. The first "hostynnyi dvir" (trading courtyard) is known as early as the mid 16th century. In the 15th century there was established the Convent of St Florus. At the beginning of the 17th century, there was established Epiphany Monastery of the Kyiv Orthodox Brotherhood, which also later contained the Kyiv Mohyla Academy. Until middle of the 17th century there was an Armenian community in Podil with its own Church of the Nativity of the Virgin. Also during the first half of the 17th century two Roman Catholic places of worship were built in stone, the cathedral church that was destroyed in the 1660s and its remnants found during archaeological excavations and a cathedral of the Dominican Monastery of St Nicholas that existed in 1400s-1649 and at end of the 17th century became the Orthodox cathedral of the Monastery of Sts Peter and Paul.

In 1667 under the Truce of Andrusovo, Kyiv was officially ceded to the Tsardom of Muscovy. Intensive building within Podil took place in the 17th century. An annual fair was held from 1797 to 1929 at the Kontraktova Square (Square of Contracts). Before the building of the Contract House, the Kontraktova Square was known as Mahistratska Square. At the western end of the square was the Pyrohoshcha Church mentioned in the 12th century epic poem The Tale of Igor's Campaign. Following traditions of medieval cities, in the 18th century a rotunda was built along with a fountain of the Roman goddess Felicitas in front of the magistracy was built. In 19th century the fountain was reattributed to Samson. The fountain became the first hydro-engineering structure at Podil. Not far from Kontraktova Square at Podil were the Zhytniy (Rye) Fairgrounds that existed at least since the 15th century where the main Roman Catholic cathedral Kosciol of Virgin Mary was located.

=== Modern period ===
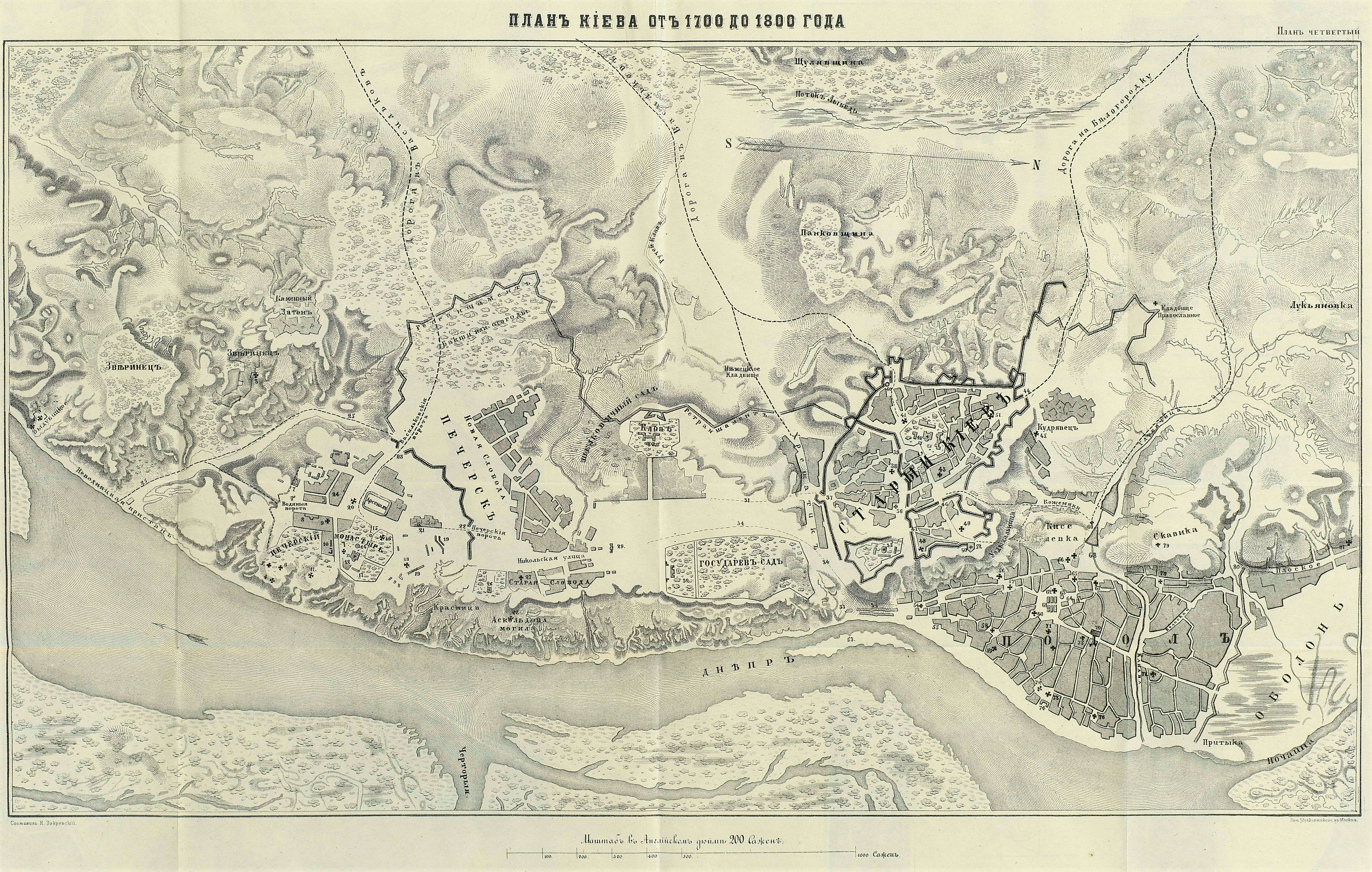
Zakrevsky 's map of Kyiv during the 18th century with Podil on the lower right

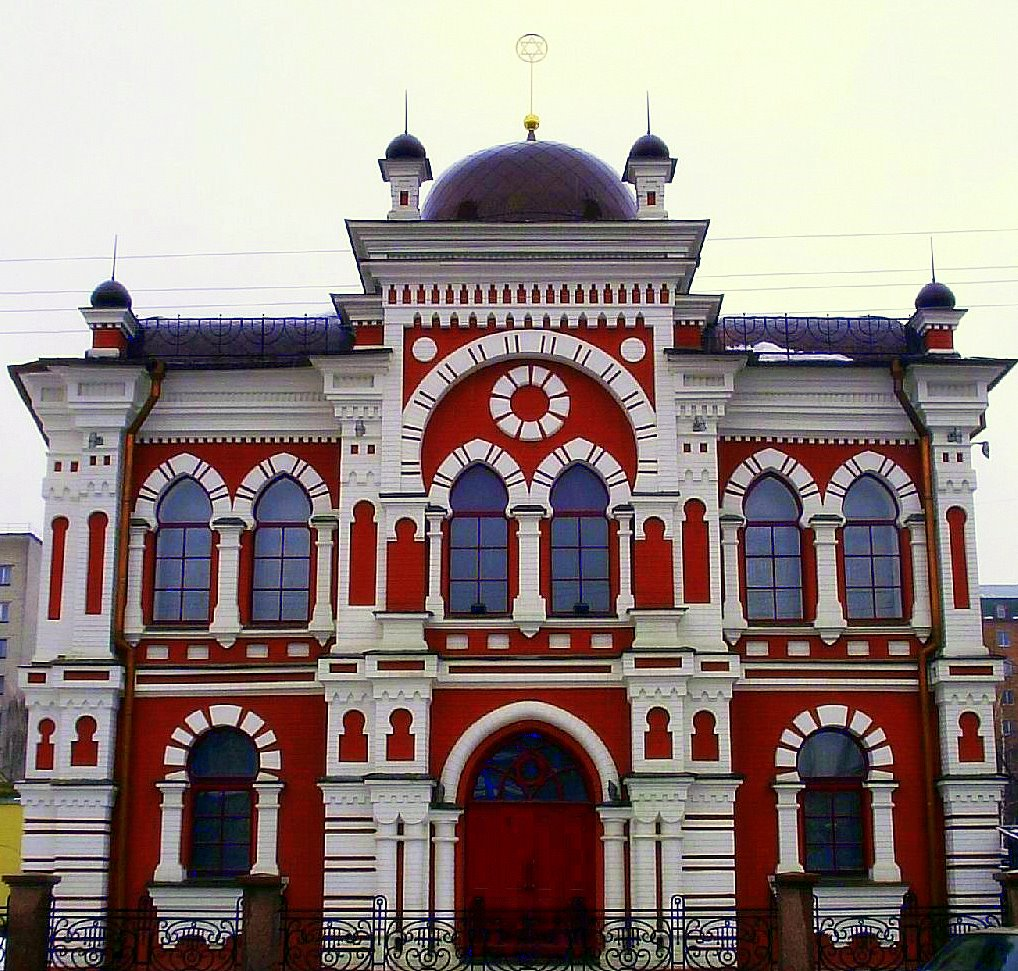
Great Choral Synagogue in the historical Jewish quarter of Podil

Before the Great Podil fire of 1811 it was the most populous neighborhood of the city with 2,068 houses out of 3,672 dwellings in all of Kyiv. The fire damaged the neighborhood extensively and changed the appearance of Podil dramatically. After the fire, Podil was reconstructed and a large number of new streets appeared, planned by Scottish architect William Heste and Russian architect Andrey Melensky, which still exist today. At this time such buildings as the Contract's House (1817), the Hostynnyi Dvir covered market and other buildings were constructed. The Contracts House was built in 1817. Contracts and treaties were signed on the ground floor; on the floor above there was a concert hall.

In 1835 the Kyiv magistracy was demolished and the bricks were used to finish building the Hostynnyi Dvir and Contracts House. A small park was established on the magistracy site. In 1938 a British Mark V tank was put in the park. It had been taken as a trophy from the Russian White Guards during the Russian Civil War. The tank remained in the park for a few years after World War II. In 1977 the Hryhoriy Skovoroda monument was built in the park.

The Kyiv tramway was among the first in the Russian Empire. The tram commuting started at Podil among the first in Kyiv in 1896. It originally was connecting Kontraktova Square and Poshtova Square and later stretched to Kurenivka and then Pushcha-Vodytsia.

Until World War II, the section just north of Nyzhniy Val street was called Ploska chast or Ploskaya sloboda. It was home to many poor Jews who lived there in wretched conditions. The Great Choral Synagogue, built in the 19th century, still functions in the area.

== Landmarks (attractions) ==
Numerous tourist attractions (also officially designated as landmarks) of Podil particularly include:

- Frolivsky Convent
- National University of Kyiv-Mohyla Academy
- House of Ivan Mazepa
- House of Peter the Great
- Fountain of Samson
- Zamkova Hora hill (Castle Hill)
- Hostynnyi Dvir (Hosting courtyard)
- Pyrohoshcha Church

=== Lost landmarks ===
- House of the Kyiv magistrate (the Kyiv Rathaus)
- Kyiv Brotherhood Monastery Epiphany Cathedral
- Church of Nicholas the Good
- Church of the Resurrection
- Church of the Saint Boris and Gleb (Borys and Hlib)
- Church of the Apostles Peter and Paul
- Church of the Saint Constantine and Yelena (Kostiantyn and Olena)
- Greek Church of the Saint Catherine

== Transport ==
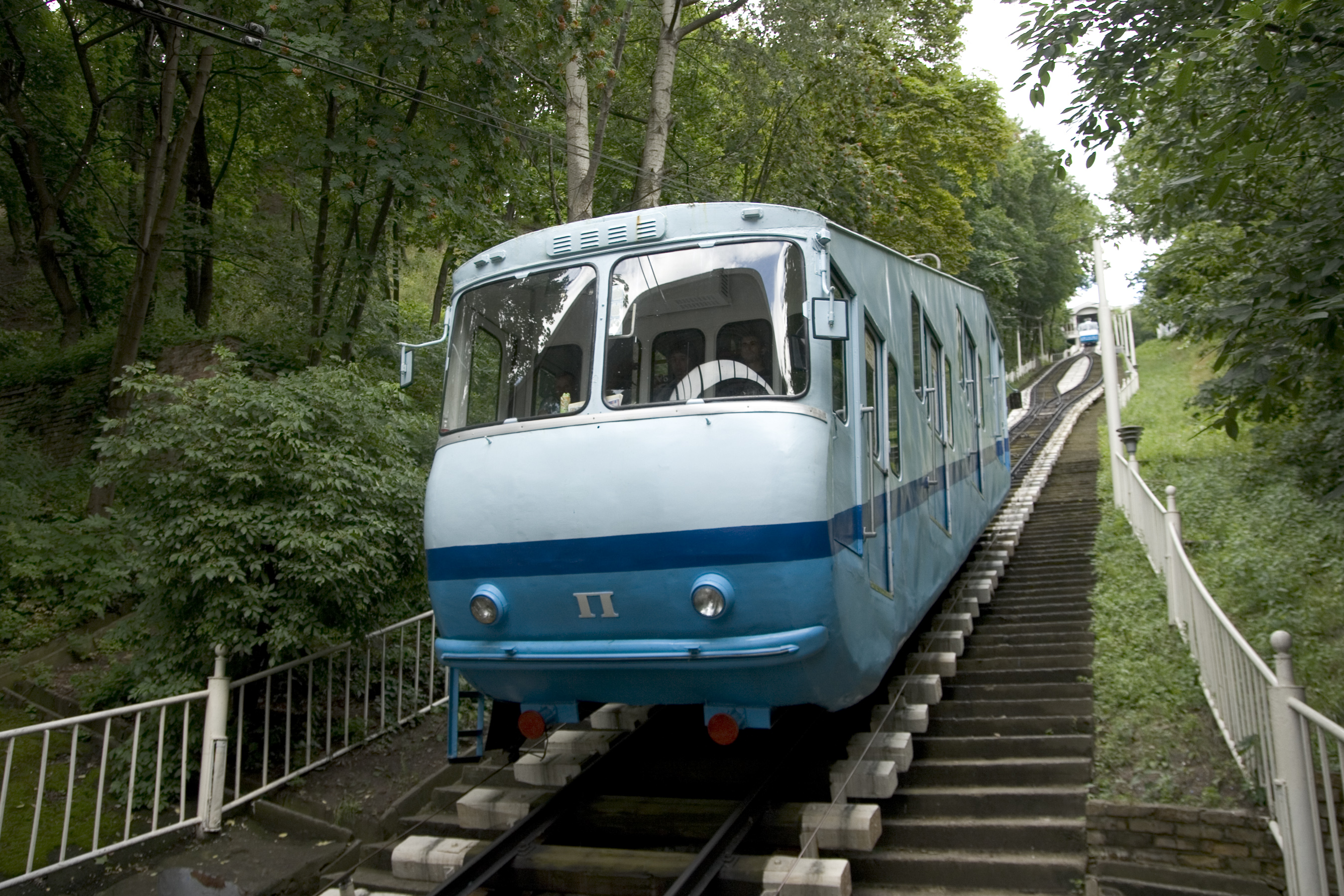
The "right" carriage of the Kyiv Funicular.

Podil is connected to the city's metro system by the following three stations on the Obolonsko–Teremkivska line: Tarasa Shevchenka, Kontraktova Ploshcha (named after the Kontraktova Square) and Poshtova Ploshcha (named after the Poshtova Square).

The Kyiv Funicular provides passenger traffic between Podil and the city's historic Uppertown neighborhood, today it is mostly used by tourists. Some time ago, the Kyiv River Port served passenger traffic on the Dnipro River, but only tourists' excursion boats are available there nowadays.

=== Streets and squares ===
- Andriyivskyy Descent
- Borychiv Descent
- Poshtova Square
- Kontraktova Square

== See also ==
- Monument to the Magdeburg Rights (Kyiv)
