= Zamkova Hora (Kyiv) =

Combined natural monument in Kyiv, Ukraine

Coordinates: 50°27′45″N 30°30′39″E

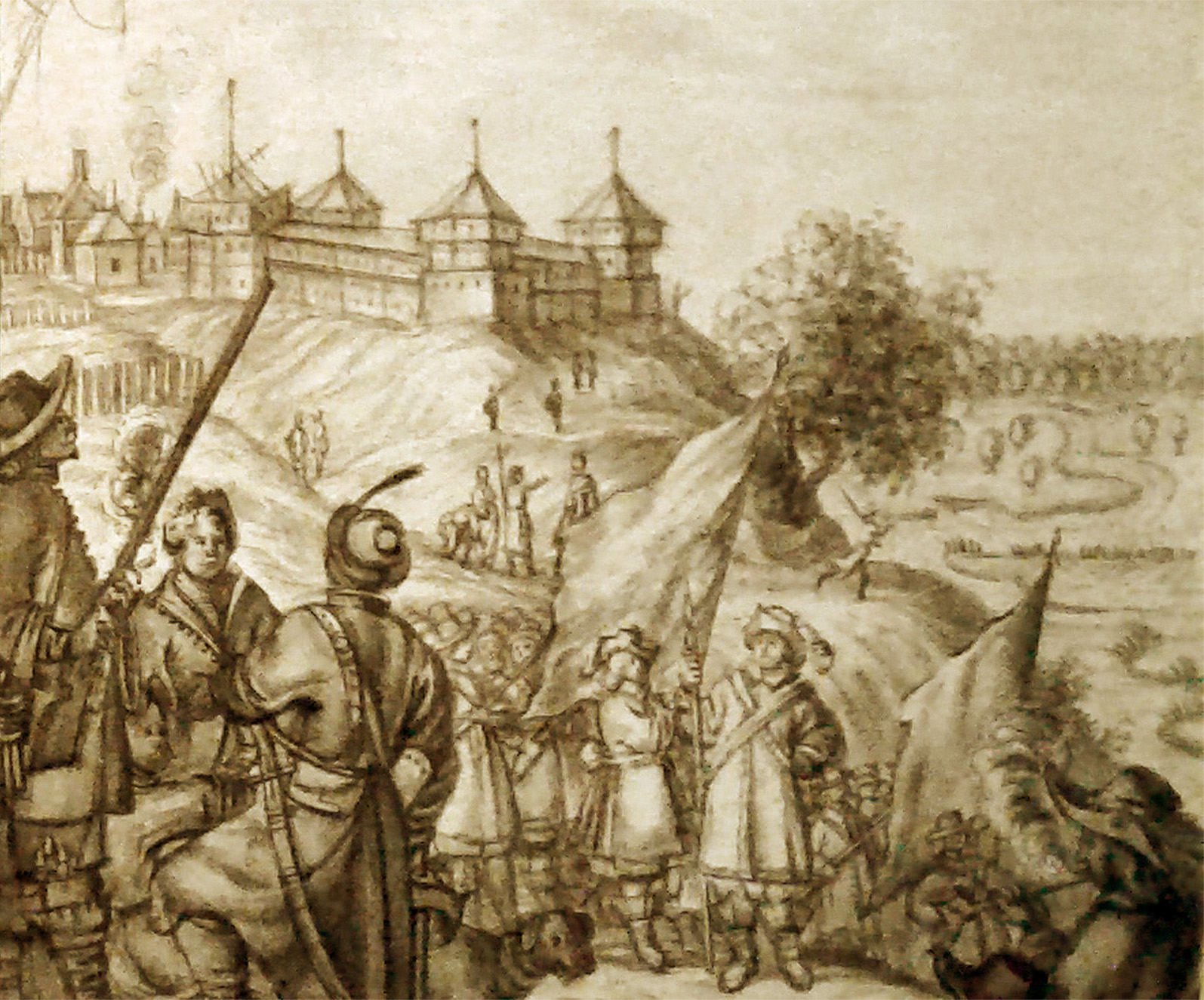
Kyiv Castle on Zamkova Hora by Abraham van Westerveld, 1651

Zamkova Hora (Ukrainian: Замкова Гора, literally Castle Hill) in Kyiv, Ukraine is a historical landmark in the center of the city. It is part of the city's geographic relief complex known as Kyiv Mountains (or Kyiv Hills). The place is called "Zamkova" because Vytautas the Great had his castle here. The Lithuanian castle had 18 towers. Other names: Khorevytsya, Kyselivka, Frolovska, Lysa Hora. Some important events of Ukrainian history took place on the hill.

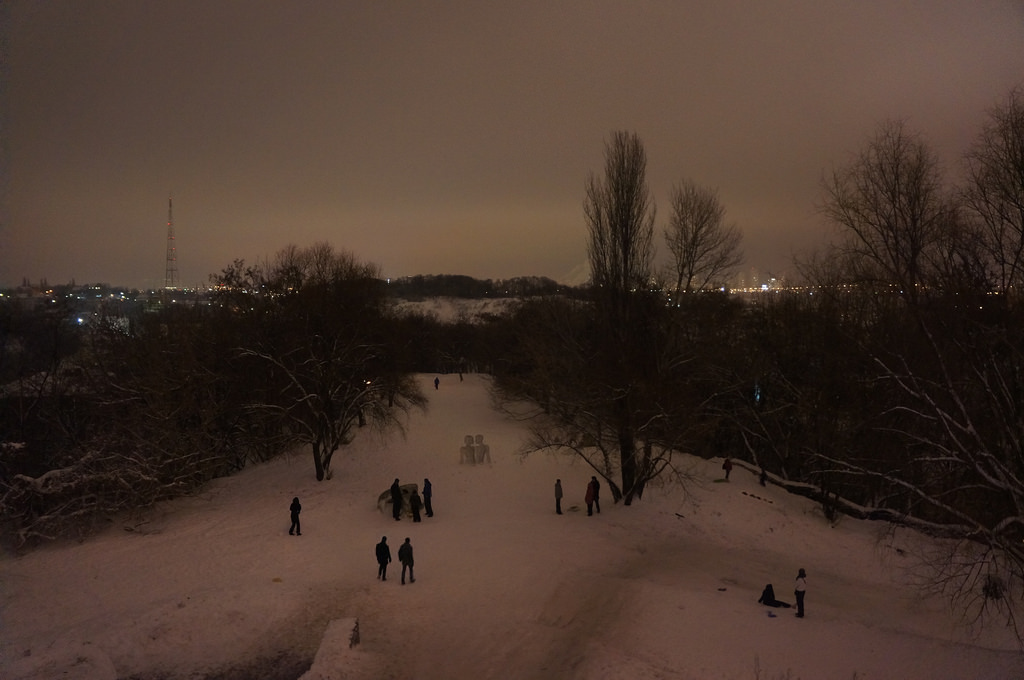
View towards Podil district with Castle Hill in the background

According to some researchers, Zamkova Hora also has a mystical prehistory, supposedly being one of the lysi hory ("bald mountains") - the sites of the witch gatherings. Geographically, it is really "bald" (lacking trees) from several sides.

In the 18th century a cemetery was established on the hill (now abandoned).

It is now a small landscape park in Podil Raion still containing interesting grave monuments. Zamkova Hora is also one of two hills that border the Andriyivskyy Descent.

Reclaiming the mystical essence of the hill, local satanist groups have conducted their ceremonies there since late 1980s. Small ritual structures were covertly built on site. Castle Hill has a unique fauna. The old trees provide hiding places for rare species of bats and attract a large number of birds, including owls (gray and eared). Fruit trees attract the Syrian woodpecker and the rare gray woodpecker. On the territory of the mountain, there are also Marmots. Common copperhead, common white-toothed, hedgehogs, and a nimble lizard are common. The insect world of the tract is also diverse.

== See also ==
- Lysa Hora (Kyiv)
- Florovsky Convent
