= Ascension Convent (Kyiv) =

Eastern Orthodox monasteries in Ukraine

- Ukrainian: Флорівський Вознесенський монастир
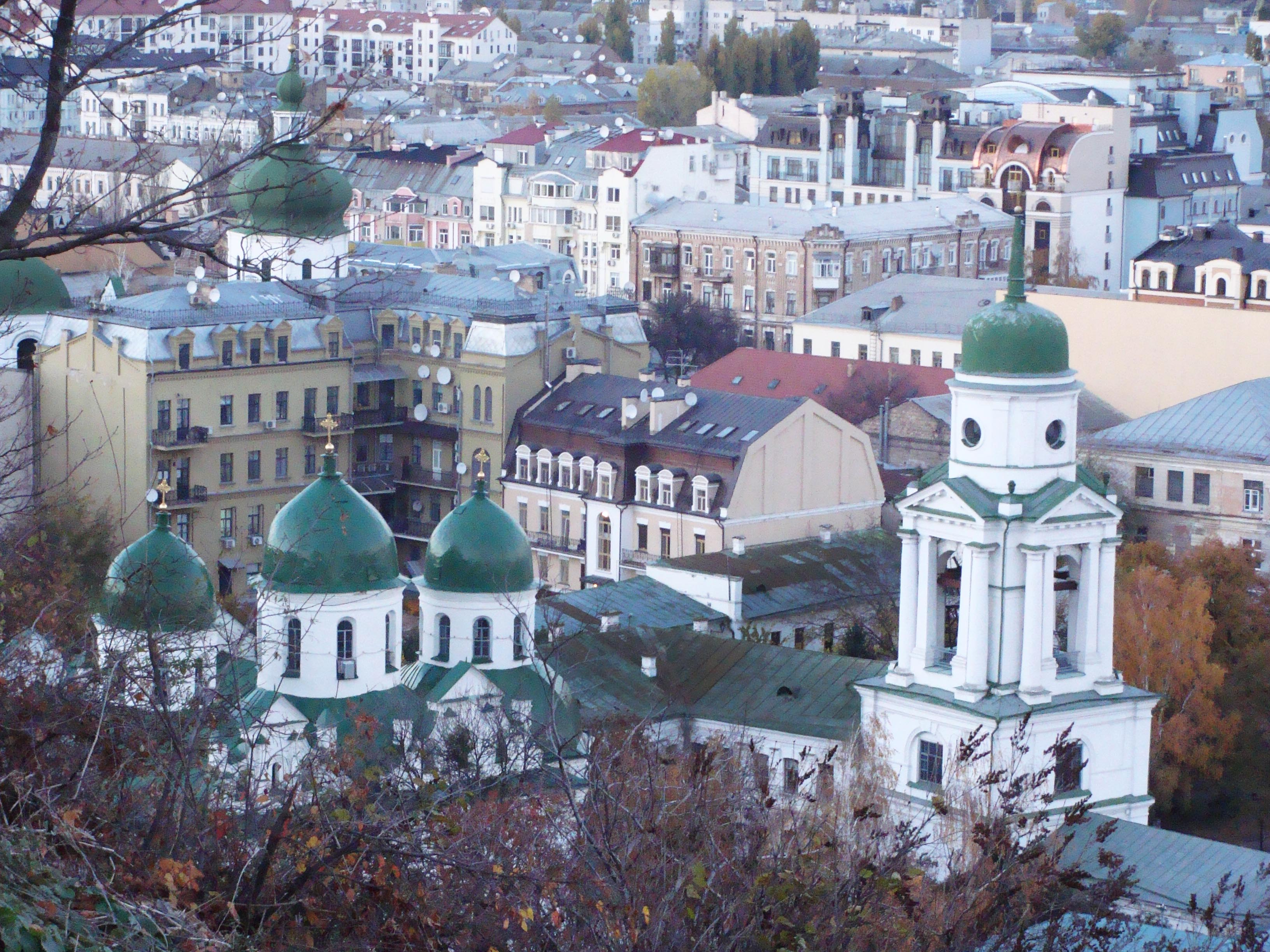
- The katholikon and bell tower

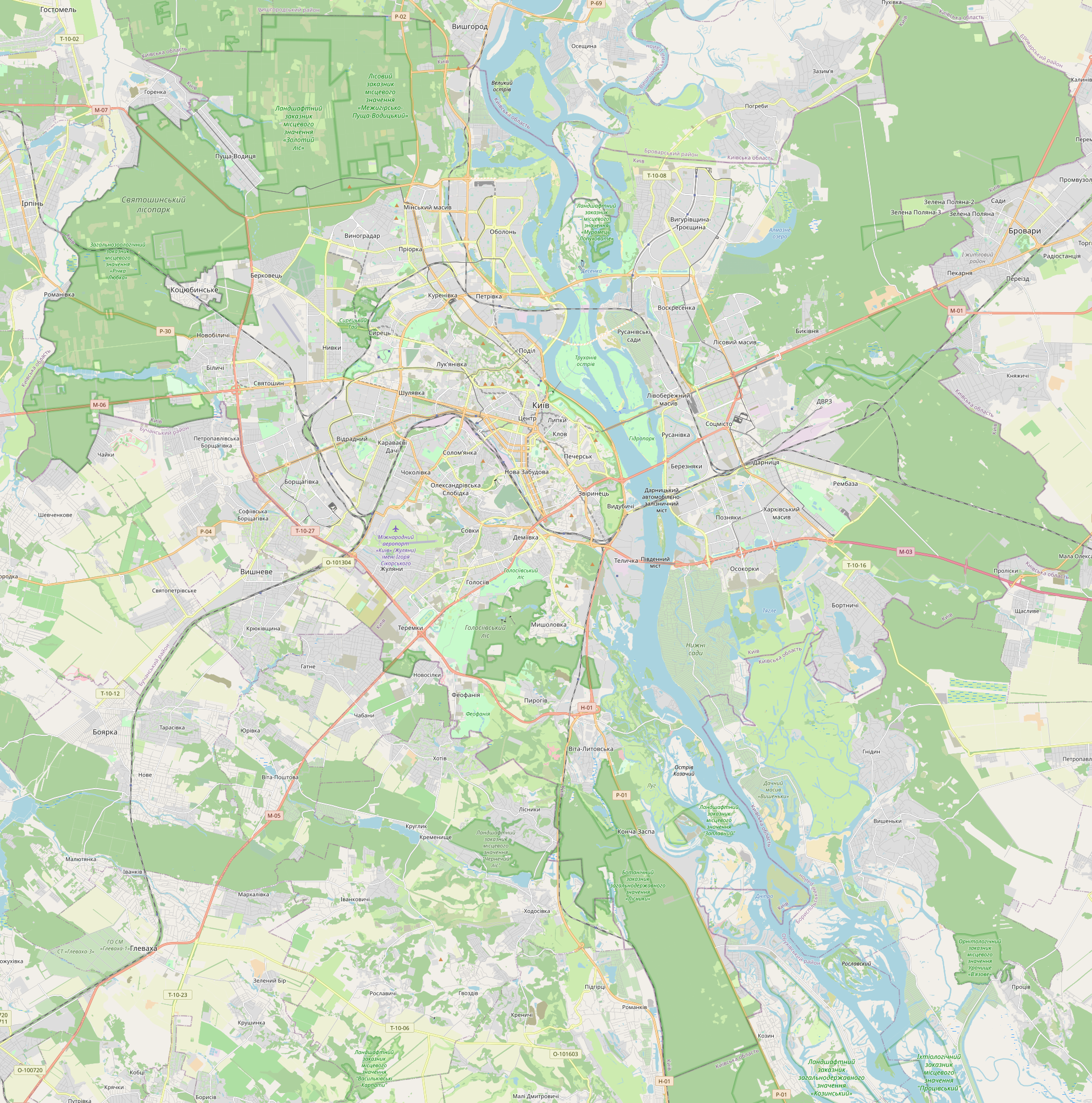
- Location within Ukraine Kyiv Ascension Convent (Kyiv Oblast) Ascension Convent (Ukraine)
- Interactive map of the Ascension Convent area

General information
- Location: Kyiv, Ukraine, Ukraine
- Coordinates: 50.46240°N 30.51471°E
- Construction started: 1732
- Owner: Ukrainian Orthodox Church (Moscow Patriarchate)

Immovable Monument of National Significance of Ukraine
- Official name: Флорівський монастир (St. Florus Monastery)
- Type: Architecture
- Reference no.: 260143

The Ascension Convent, also known as Saint Florus (Ukrainian: Флорівський монастир, Florivskyi monastyr) in a monastery located at 8 Frolivska street in the historic Podil district of Kyiv, Ukraine. It originated in the 16th century as the wooden church of Sts. Florus and Laurus. Its buildings occupy the slopes of the Zamkova Hora.

== History ==
The convent greatly expanded at the time of the Great Northern War, when Peter the Great ordered the relocation of the old Ascension Convent on Pechersk Hill with the aim of building an arsenal there. When run by Ivan Mazepa's mother, the older convent had amassed much property. Its riches and nuns were transferred to the Florovsky Convent.

The main church, or katholikon, is a notable example of Ukrainian Baroque architecture. Its first stone was laid in 1722. Ten years later, the three-domed building was dedicated to the feast of the Ascension of Christ. Its Neoclassical bell-tower is of later construction.

The wooden buildings of the monastery were entirely destroyed by fire in 1811. Only the katholikon and a 17th-century refectory were left standing amid the ashes. It was Andrey Melensky, a Neoclassical architect from Moscow, who was in charge of the convent's reconstruction.

The convent's notable residents included Princess Natalia Dolgorukova, one of the first Russian women writers. It was closed in 1929 by the Bolsheviks but reopened after the Germans entered the city in 1941. Several buildings have since been taken over by Soviet industrial enterprises.

In the fall of 2019, the Artynov House in the Podil district of Kyiv was demolished to build cells. It was built in 1809-1811 and is a monument of urban planning and architecture number 18/13. In early June 2020, a coronavirus outbreak was reported in the monastery, and the institution was quarantined.

== Spiritual life ==
The monastery was known for its charitable and educational activities in the late nineteenth century (a school and a hospital for the poor were in operation).

In the XVII-XVIII centuries, the abbesses of the monastery were Princess Kateryna Miloslavska, Countess Apraksina, and Princess Shakhovska. Princess Natalia Dolgorukova was its novice.

The abbess of the Florivsky Monastery, Smaragda, wrote a book known among Orthodox believers, "Reverent Christian Reflections." Oleksandra Melgunova, founder of the Seraphim and Dives Monastery, took her vows at the Florovsky Monastery. Services are performed by the clergy of the Ukrainian Orthodox Church.
