= Borychiv Descent =

Descent in Kyiv, Ukraine

Coordinates: 50.458814°N 30.523319°E

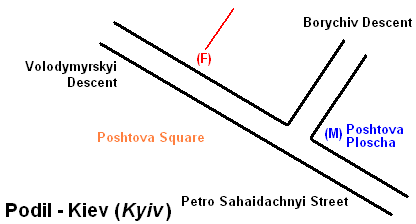
A scheme of the area surrounding the Borychiv Descent in the historic and merchant quarter of Kyiv, Podil.

Borychiv Descent (Ukrainian: Боричів узвіз, translit.: Borychiv uzviz) is a historic descent in the historical and merchant quarter of Kyiv, the Podil (Podol) neighbourhood. It is located near the Poshtova Square.

Its legendary name, Borichev Descent, is derived from either the name of a wealthy Kyivan who lived there at the turn of the 19th century, or from the word borych/biruch (Ukrainian: борич/бірюч), which means a herald and customs officer serving the Kyiv Prince in the Middle Ages. Some scholars believe that today's Borychiv Descent corresponds to the legendary one mentioned in the 12th century poem, The Tale of Igor's Campaign (Slovo o polku Ihorevim); others state that the ancient Borychev Descent is actually today's Andriyivskyi Descent. Borichev Descent is also mentioned in the Primary Chronicle where it talks about the creation of Kyiv city.

Several houses from the first part of the 19th century have been preserved on the nearby Borychiv Tik (Ukrainian: Боричів Тік, translit.: Borychiv Tik), which starts from the Borychiv Descent. This street is popularized by its usage as a set in many historical movies.
