= Kyiv Funicular =

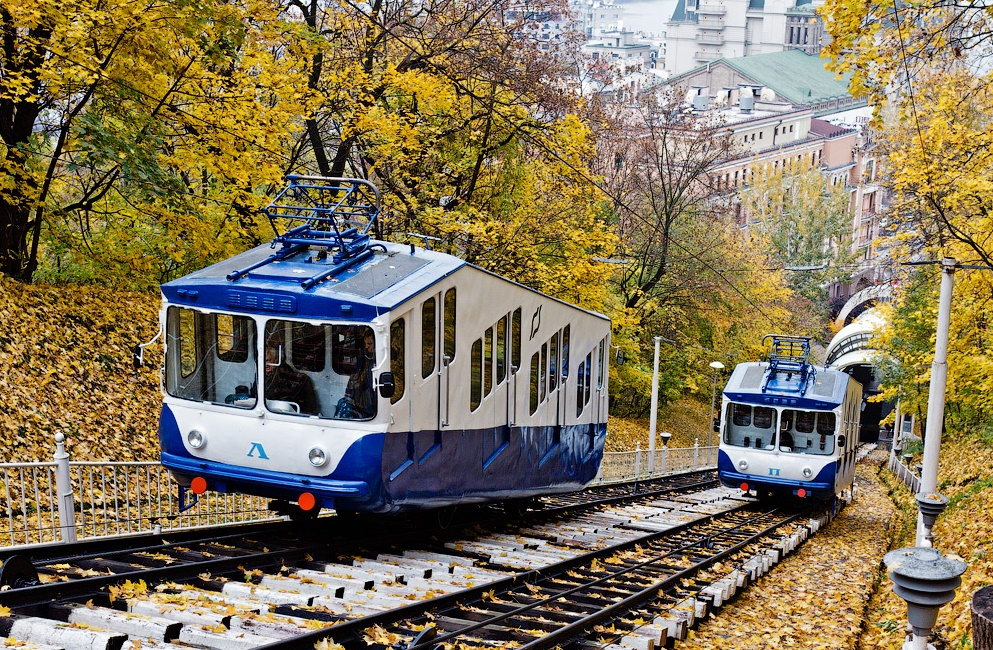
- Looking from the top station, two Kyiv funicular wagons approach each other, where they will finally pass each other on the system's two track sidings

Overview
- Native name: Київський фунікулер
- Locale: Kyiv, Ukraine
- Coordinates: 50°27′28″N 30°31′25″E
- Termini: Poshtova (lower station); Mykhailivska (upper station)
- Stations: 2

Service
- Type: Funicular
- Operator: Kyivpastrans

History
- Opened: 1905

Technical
- Line length: 238 metres (781 ft)
- Track gauge: 1,200 mm (3 ft 11 1/4 in)
- Electrification: 100 kW
- Maximum incline: 36%

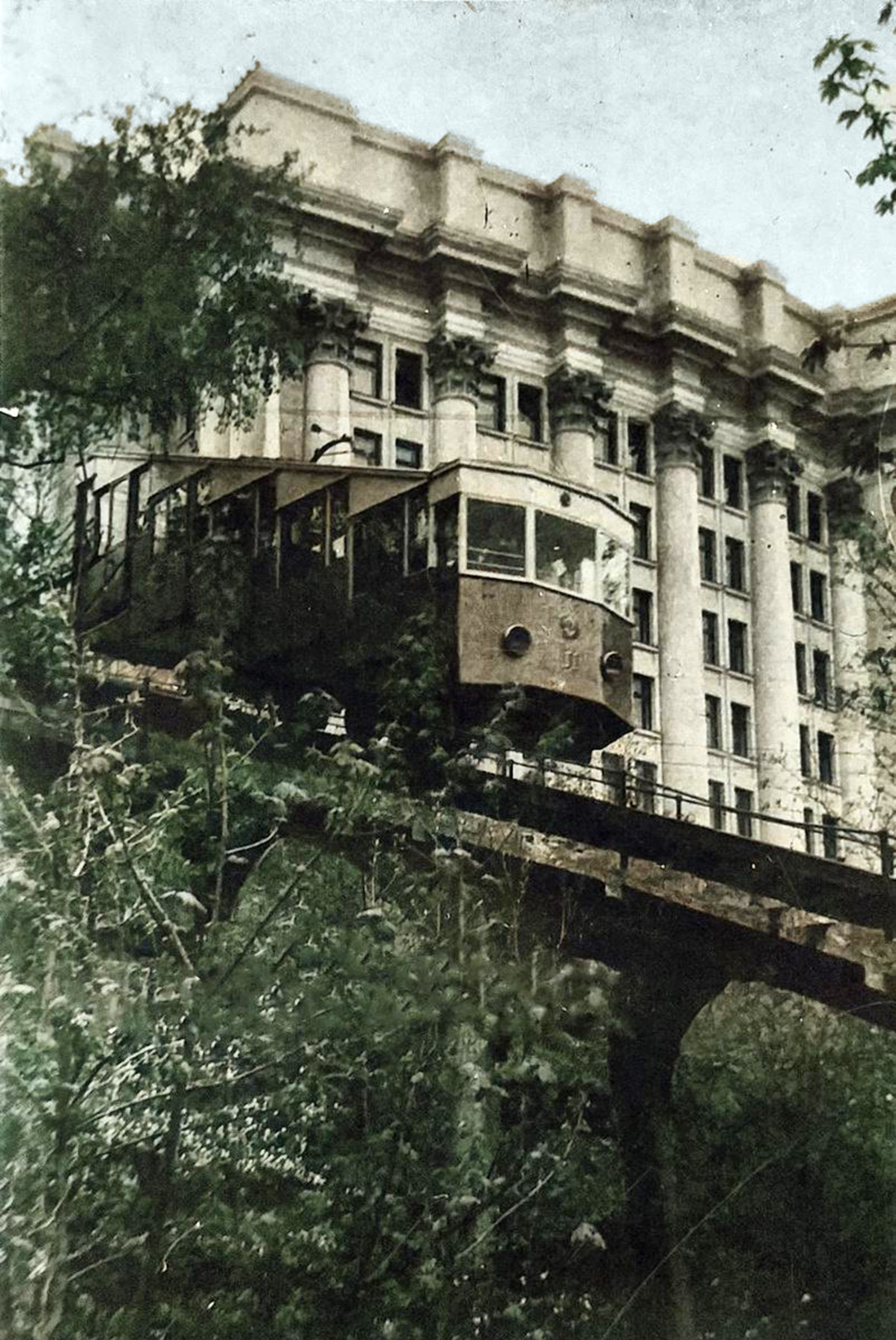
The Л or left funicular wagon as seen in pre-WWII Kyiv, ca. 1939.

The Kyiv Funicular (Ukrainian: Київський фунікулер [ˈkɪjiu̯sʲkɪj fʊn⁽ʲ⁾ikʊˈlɛr]) is a steep slope railroad on Kyiv Hills that serves the city of Kyiv, connecting the historic Uppertown, and the lower commercial neighborhood of Podil through the steep Volodymyrska Hill overseeing the Dnieper River. The line consists of only two stations and is operated by the Kyiv city community enterprise Kyivpastrans.

== History ==
The funicular was constructed during 1902–1905, and was first opened to the public on 20 May [O.S. 7 May] 1905. The construction cost, about 230,000 rubles, was covered by a Belgian owner of the Kyiv trams. The funicular was the project of Arthur Abrahamson, who received professional training on railroad engineering in Zürich, Switzerland and Saint Petersburg, Russia. The station vestibules were initially developed by N. Pyatnitskiy, and the railway structure was designed by N. Baryshnikov.

Due to its proximity to the St. Michael's Cathedral, it was once named the Mykhailivskyi Mekhanichnyi Pidyom (Ukrainian: Михайлівський механічний підйом, literally St. Michael's Mechanical Lift). After the cathedral was destroyed by the Soviet authorities in 1935–1936, the name of the funicular was changed.

In 1984 the lower station changed its outlook. It was redeveloped by architects Janos Vig, Valentine Yezhov, and others.

== Technical details ==
The funicular uses the two rail and passing-loop system. The two cars are designated with the Cyrillic letters Λ (Ukrainian: Лівий, lit. 'left') and П (Ukrainian: Правий, lit. 'right') which stand for left and right cars. The funicular was renovated three times: in 1928, 1958, and 1984.

Track gauge: 1,200 mm (3 ft 11 1/4 in). Total track length: 238 meters (781 ft). The total gradient of the slope on which the funicular runs on is 36%. The cable cars are powered by an electric motor which is located inside the upper station and in tram type.

The travel time between the stations is approximately 3 minutes. The route is from the Mykhailivska Square in the Uptown to the Poshtova Square in the Podil. The ticket price is much like for the other city-owned public transportation methods, ₴8 (approx. US$0.3 as of July 2018). The funicular provides daily service to 10,000-15,000 passengers, and annually to 2.8 million passengers.

Since the funicular was originally built to extend the tram network up an otherwise impossible gradient, monthly tickets that are otherwise only valid on the tramway continue to include it.

The funicular was closed on September 25, 2006, for restoration, which is usually conducted every year. The total cost of the restoration was expected to be ₴455,400 (about US$90,500).

== Accidents and incidents ==
On 7 April 2024 a teenager suffered fatal injuries after crashing through a glass panel at the funicular's upper station. According to witnesses, the victim had been pushed by another passenger after a verbal conflict. In September 2025 the suspect was sentenced to life imprisonment on accusation of murder.

== Gallery ==
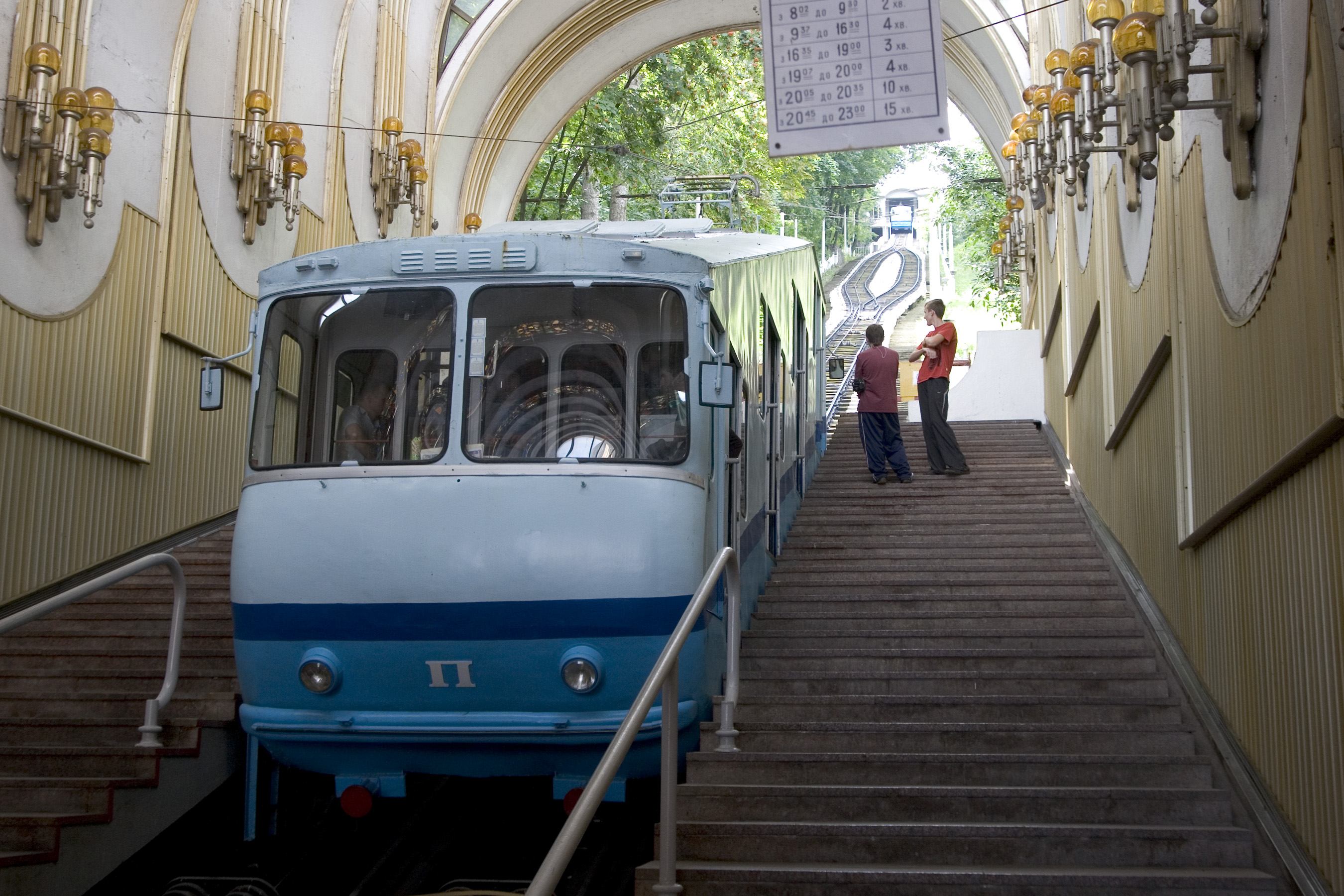
Lower station

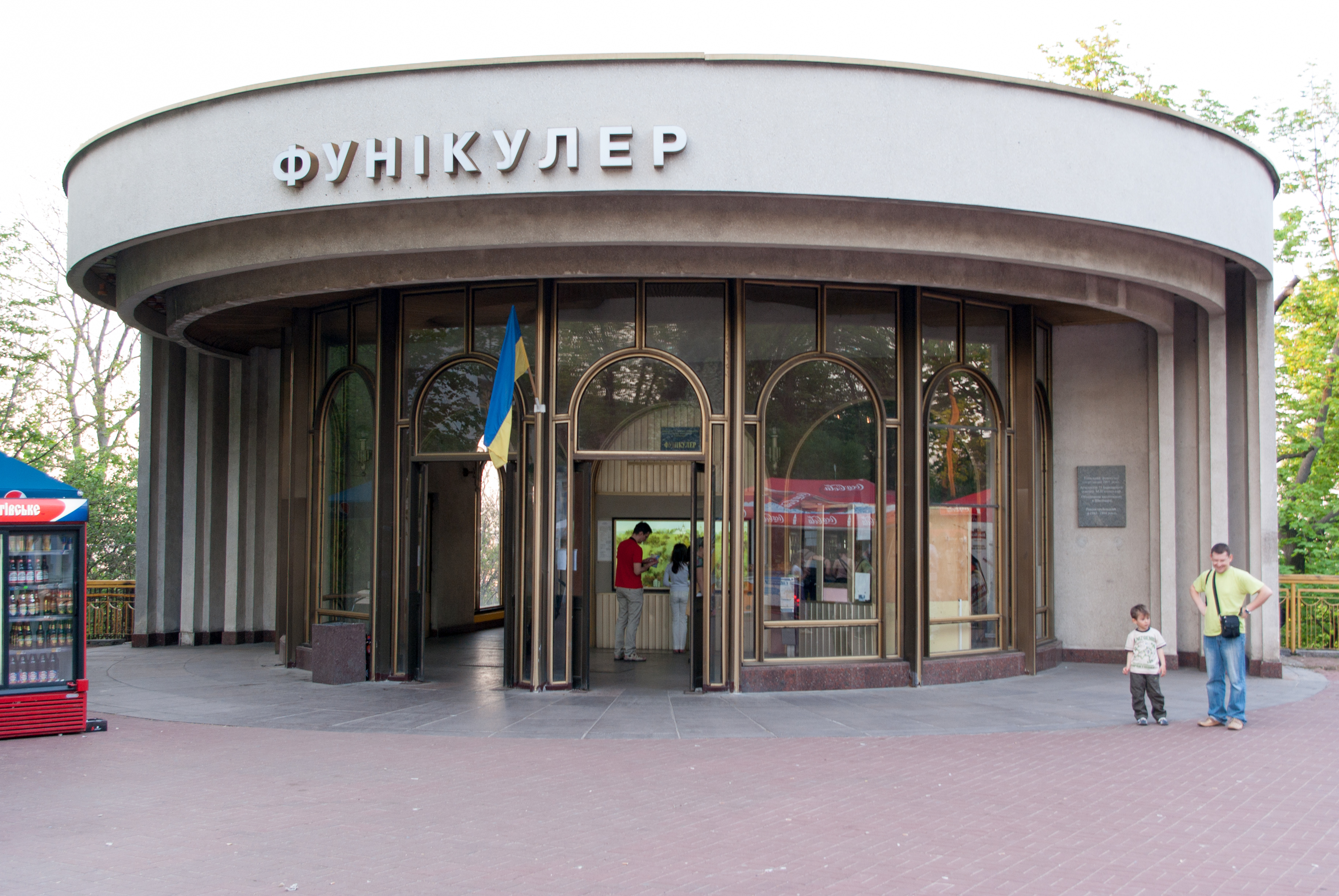
Upper station

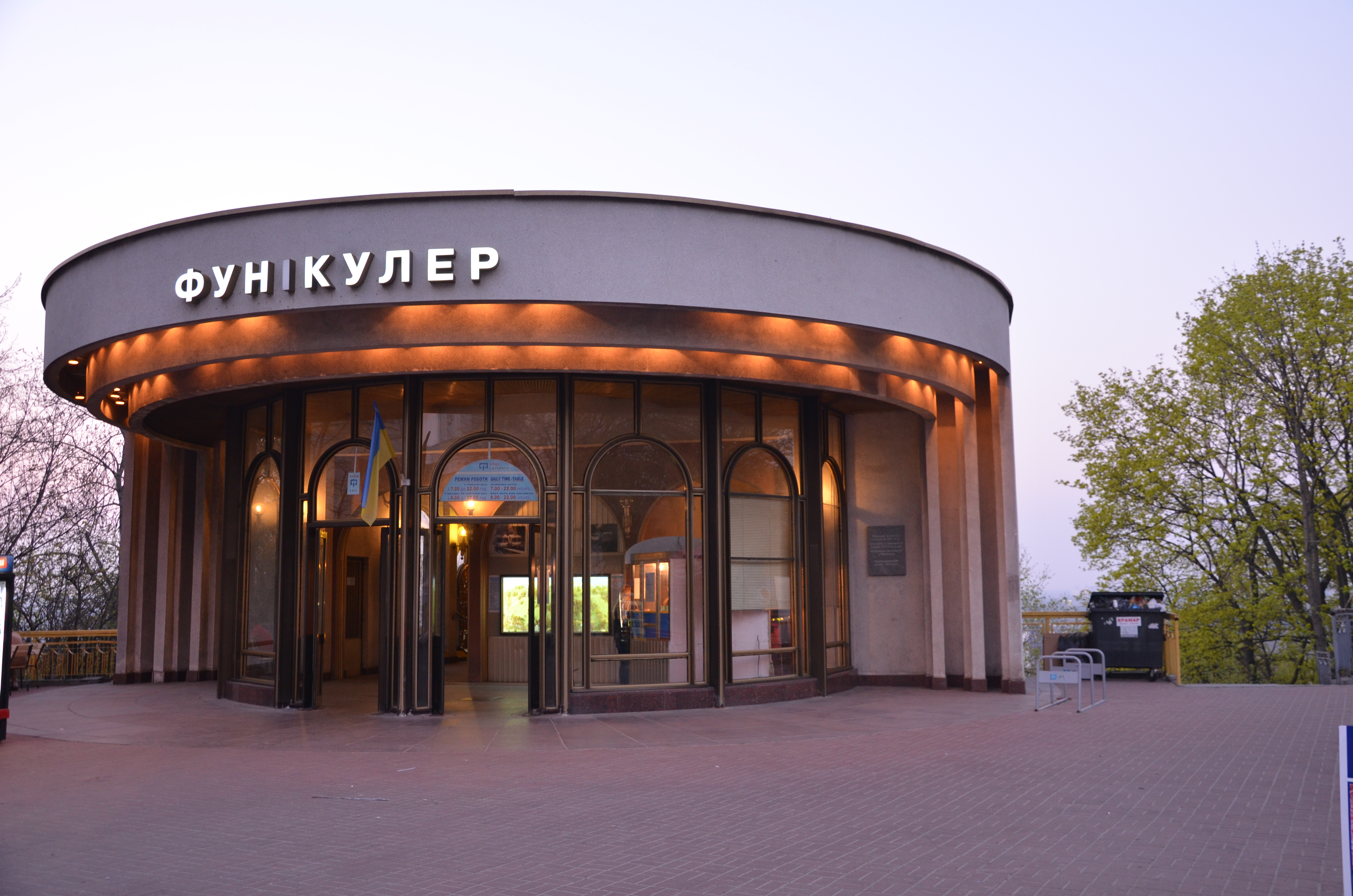
Upper station with night illumination

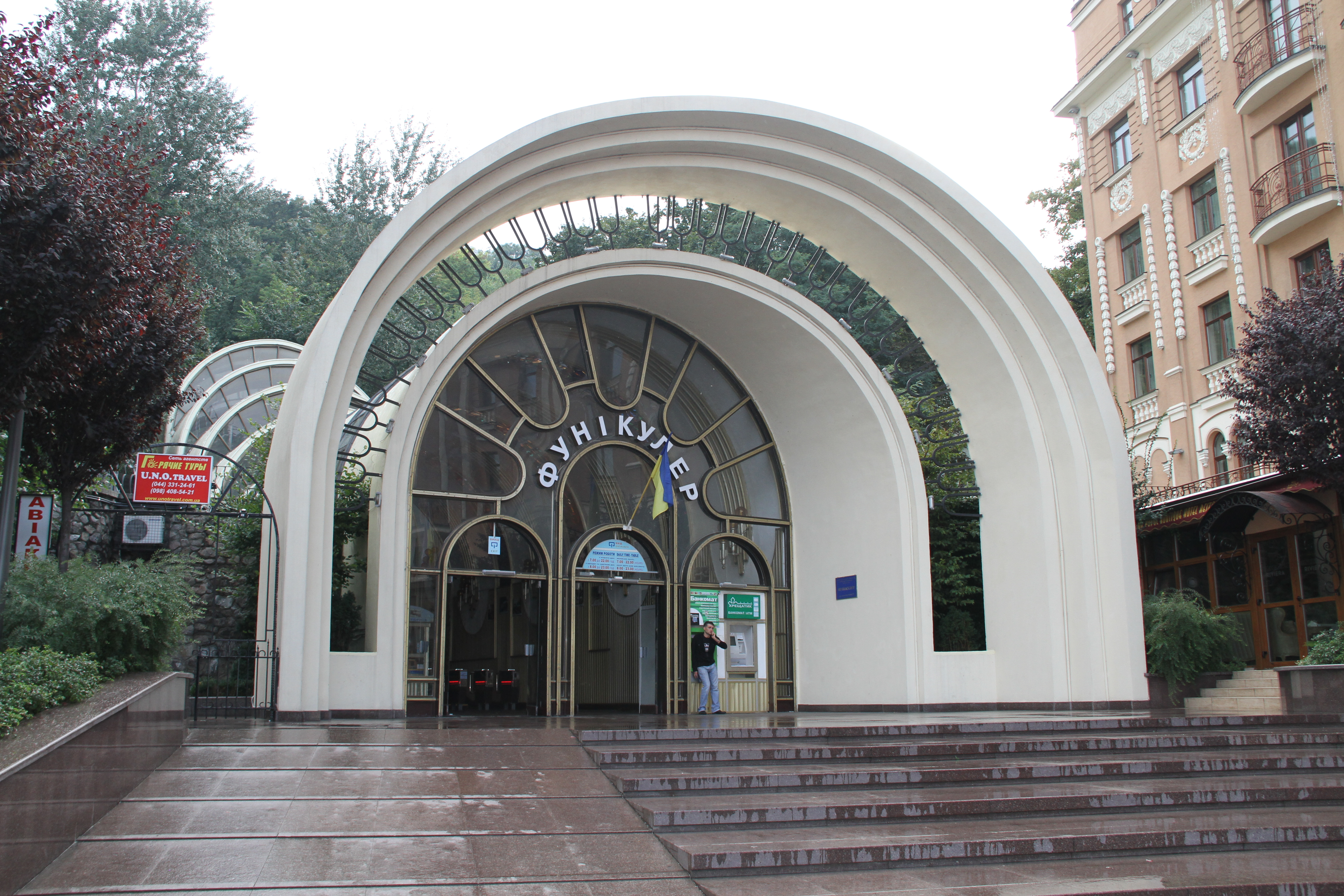
Lower station

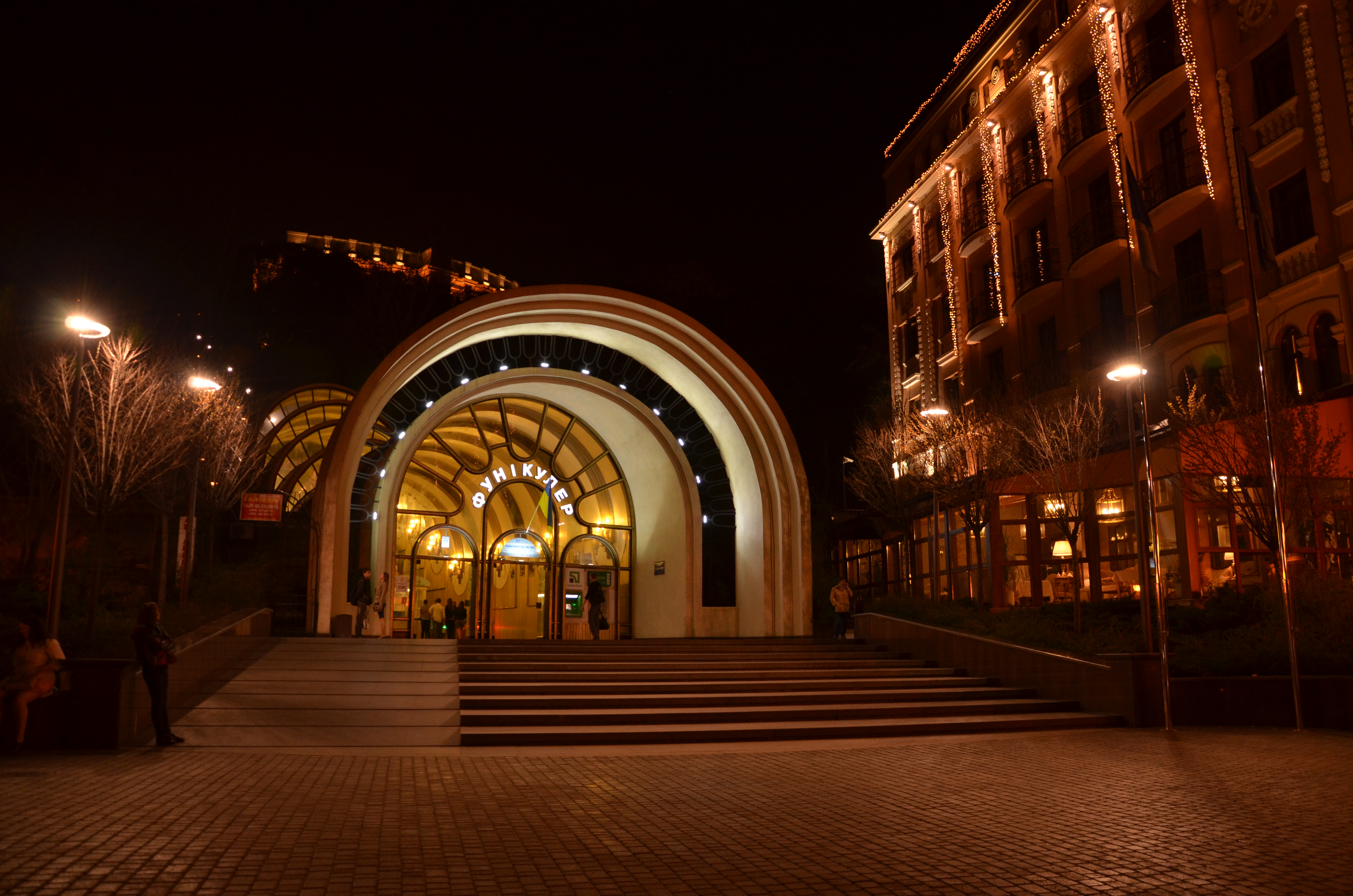
Lower station with night illumination

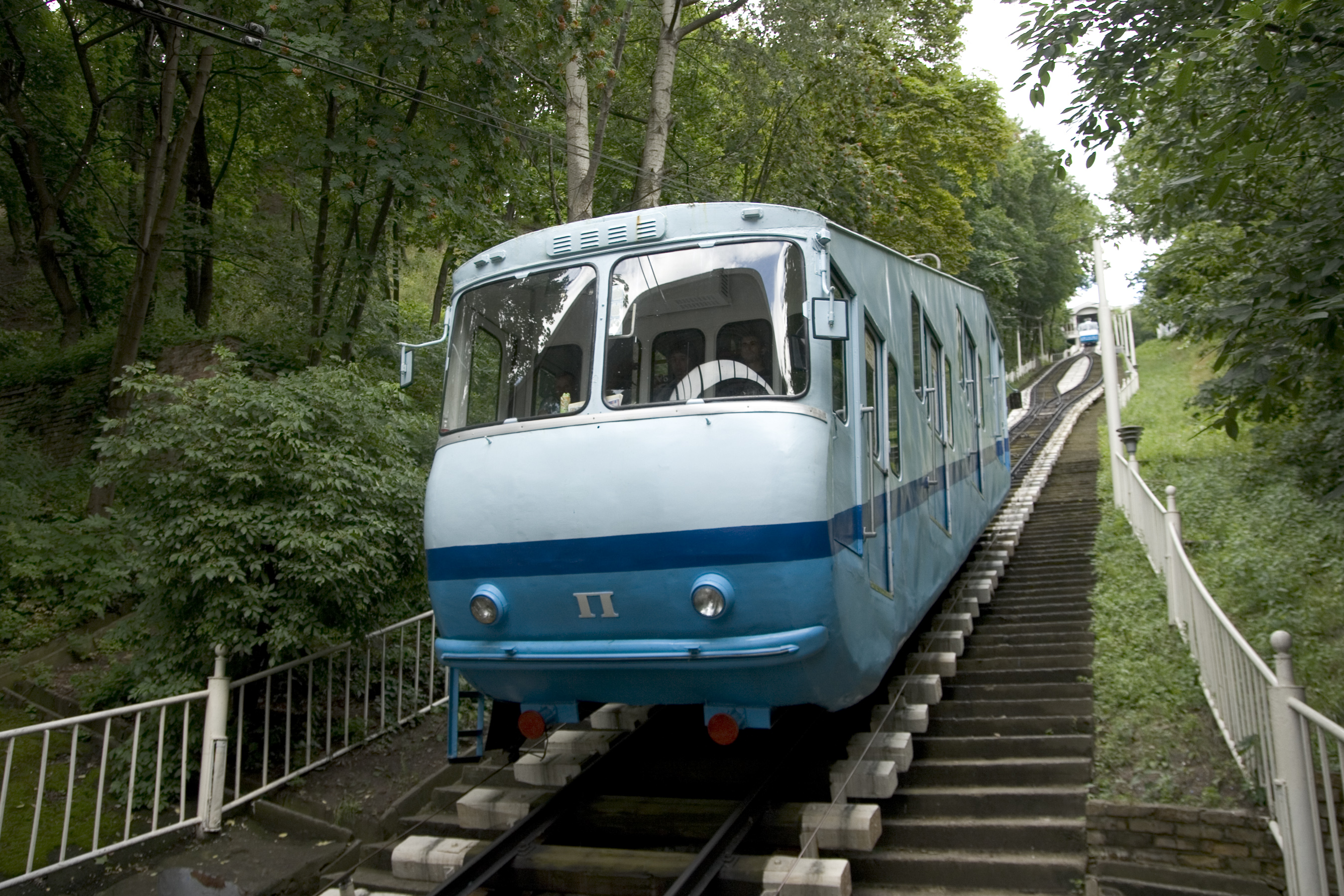
Carriage

== See also ==
- Odesa Funicular
- List of funicular railways
