= Ancient Kyiv =

Ancient Kyiv (Ukrainian: Стародавній Київ, romanized: Starodavnii Kyiv [stɐroˈdɑu̯n⁽ʲ⁾ij ˈkɪjiu̯]) is a historic reserve of the city of Kyiv, Ukraine. The preserve is a complex of landmarks located mostly in the area of the Kyiv city Podil district and stretching onto part of the Upper city known as Honchari-Kozhumiaky.

Created in 1987, the borders of the preserve were established by the Kyiv City Administration (Executive Committee) in 1988. All its components were official registered in the Register of National Monuments.

The preserve covers an area of 175 ha (430 acres) and includes 74 landmarks of architecture, 15 history, 22 archaeology, ant two landmarks of monumental art.

== List of landmarks ==
- Ensemble of the Saint Elijah (Illia) Church (17th - 18th century)
  - Church building
  - Belfry
  - Gate and walls
  - Minor Seminary
- Ensemble of the Brotherhood Monastery (17th - 19th century)
  - Old Academic Building
  - New Academic Building
  - Refectory with the Church of Holy Spirit
  - Sundial
  - Kitchen with cells
  - Cells
  - Prosphora factory
  - Hegumen building
  - Seminary
- Ensemble of the Florivskyi Convent
  - Church of the Ascension
  - Belfry
  - Refectory Church
  - Hegumen building
- Church of Nicholas the Embankment
- Church of Nicholas the Impressive
- Belfry of Nicholas the Good Church
- Academy of Visual Art and Architecture building (former Theological Seminary)
- Building of a Postal Station
- Old Building of Contracts
- Building of Contracts
- Magdeburg Right Column
- Prince Vladimir the Great monument
- six residential buildings (various locations)
- Store
- Granary
- College
- Intercession Church
- Intercession Monastery
  - St Nicholas Cathedral
  - Temple of the Intercession
- Refectory of the Michael's Golden-Domed Monastery

=== Rebuilt landmarks of architecture ===
- St. Michael's Golden-Domed Monastery
  - Michael's Golden-Domed Cathedral
  - Belfry
- Church Assumption of Our Lady Pyrohoshcha
- Fountain of Samson
- Church of the Nativity

== Gallery ==
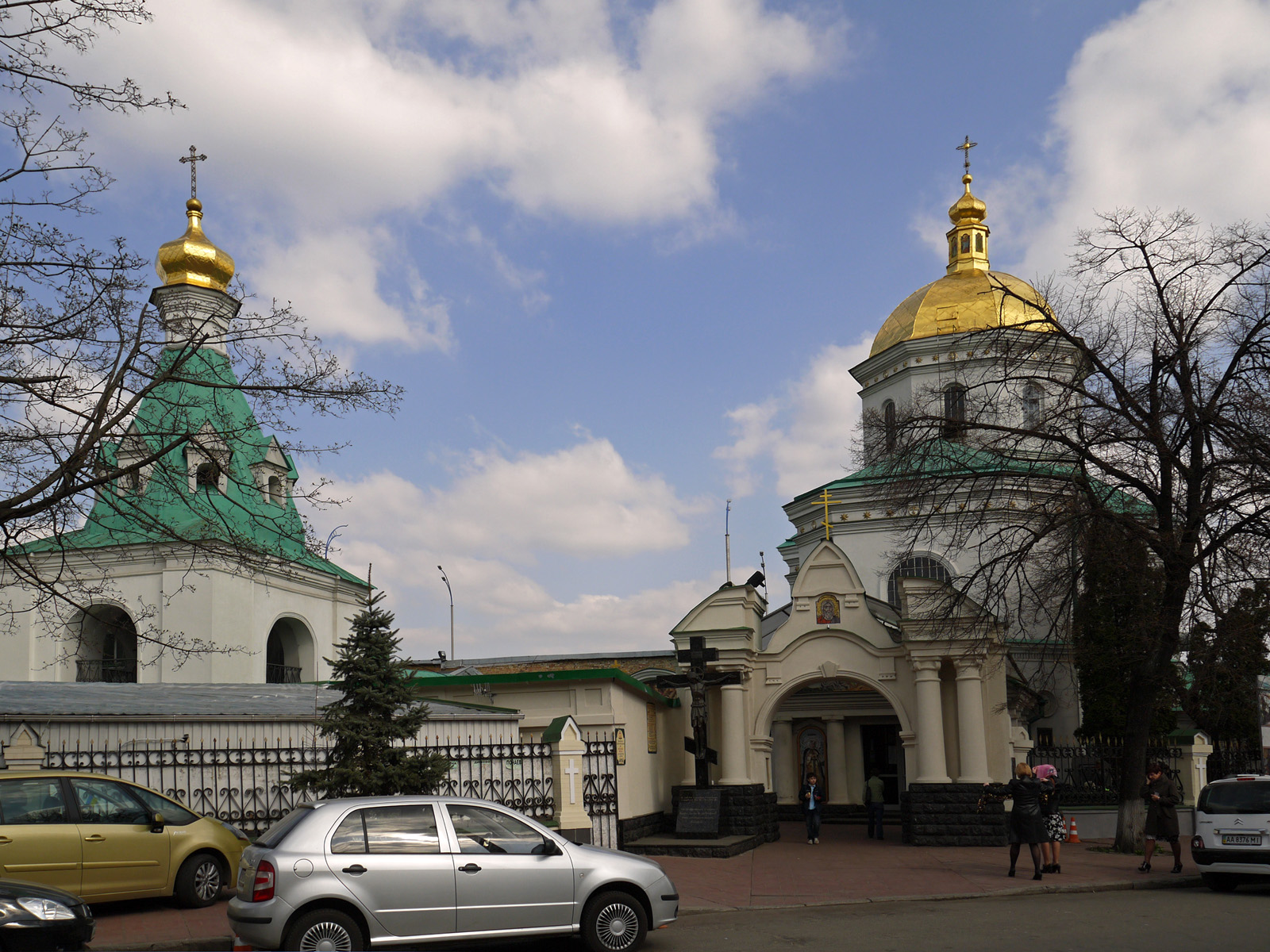
St. Elijah Church

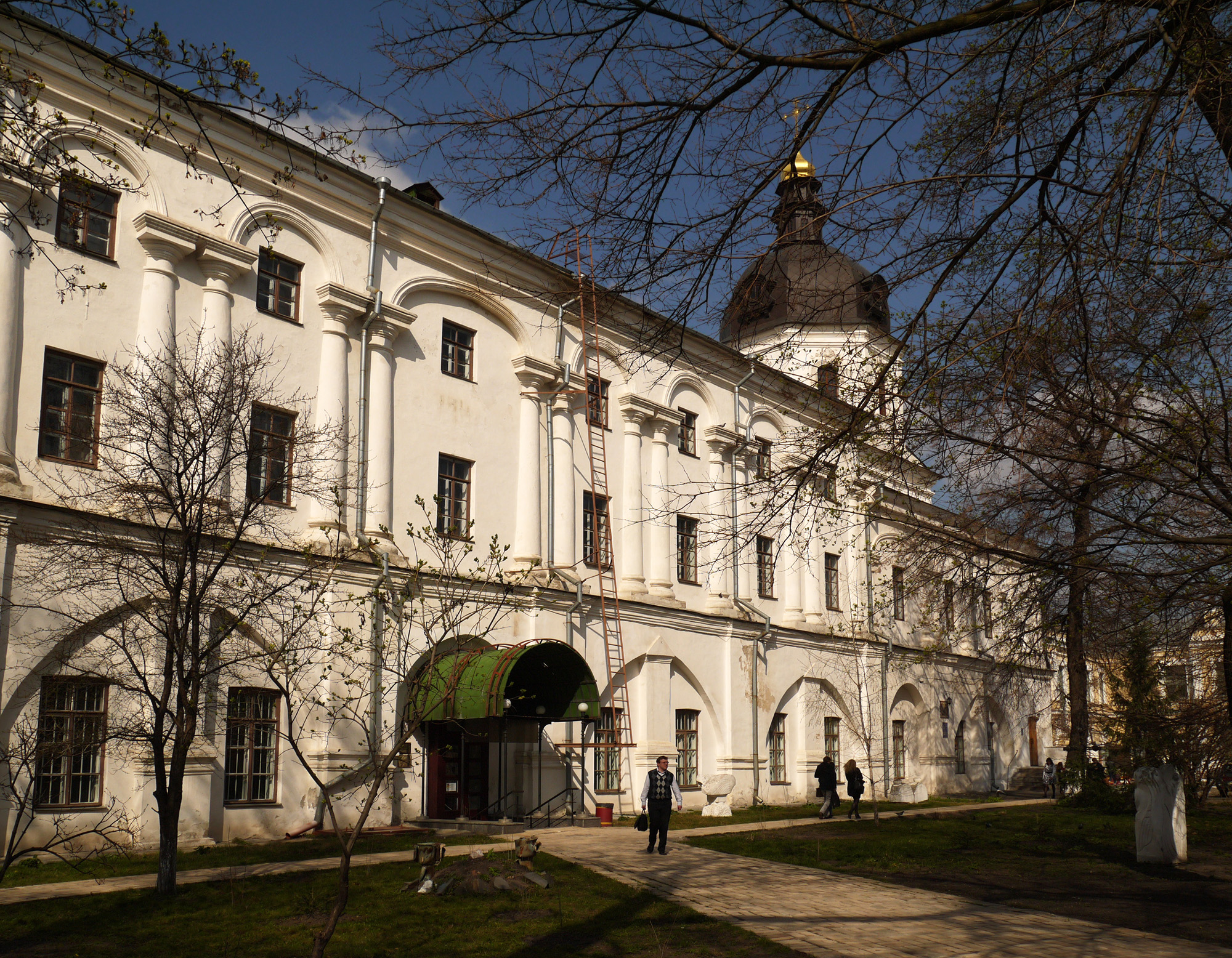
Old Academic Building

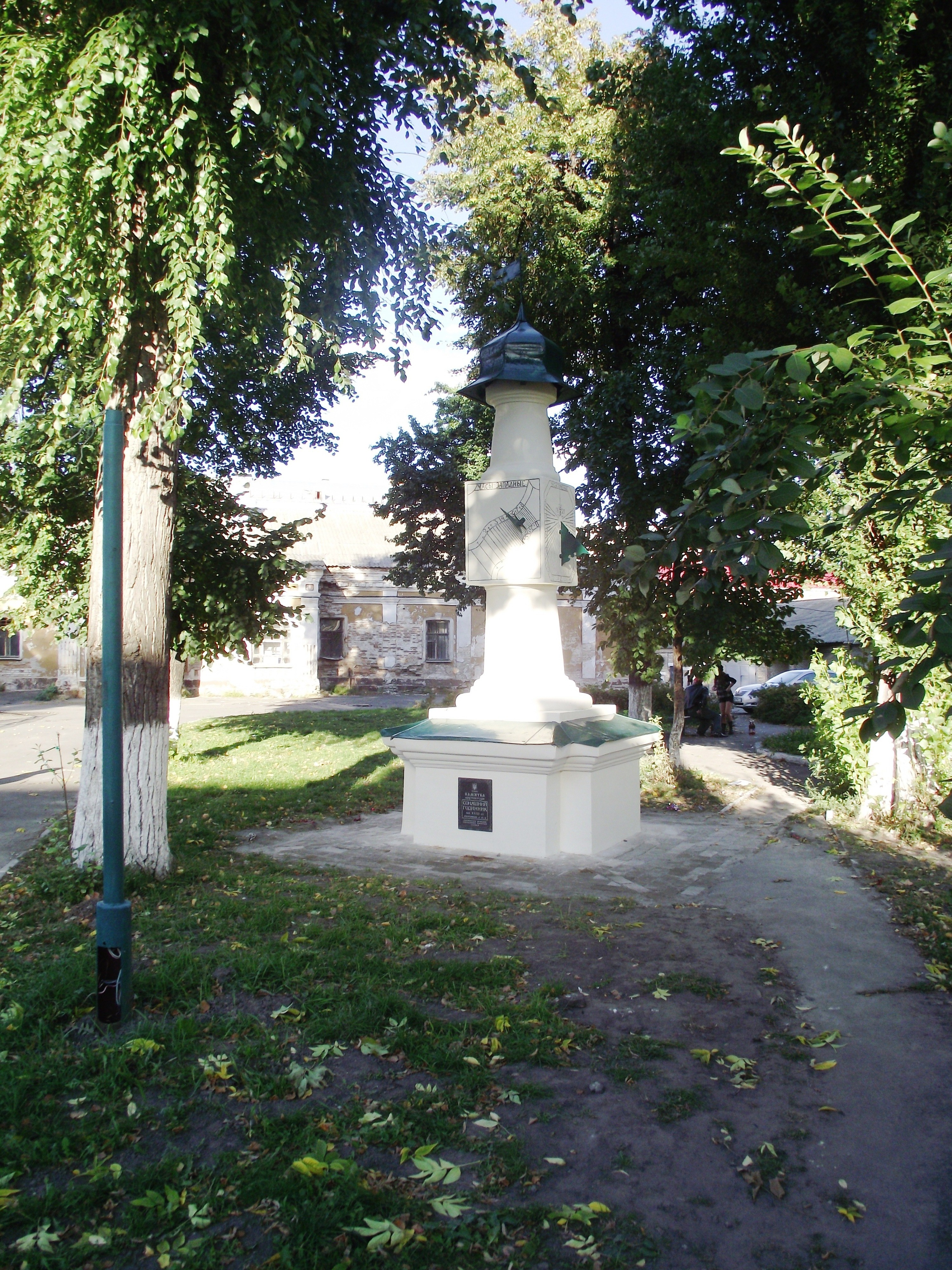
Sundial of Kyiv-Mohyla Academy

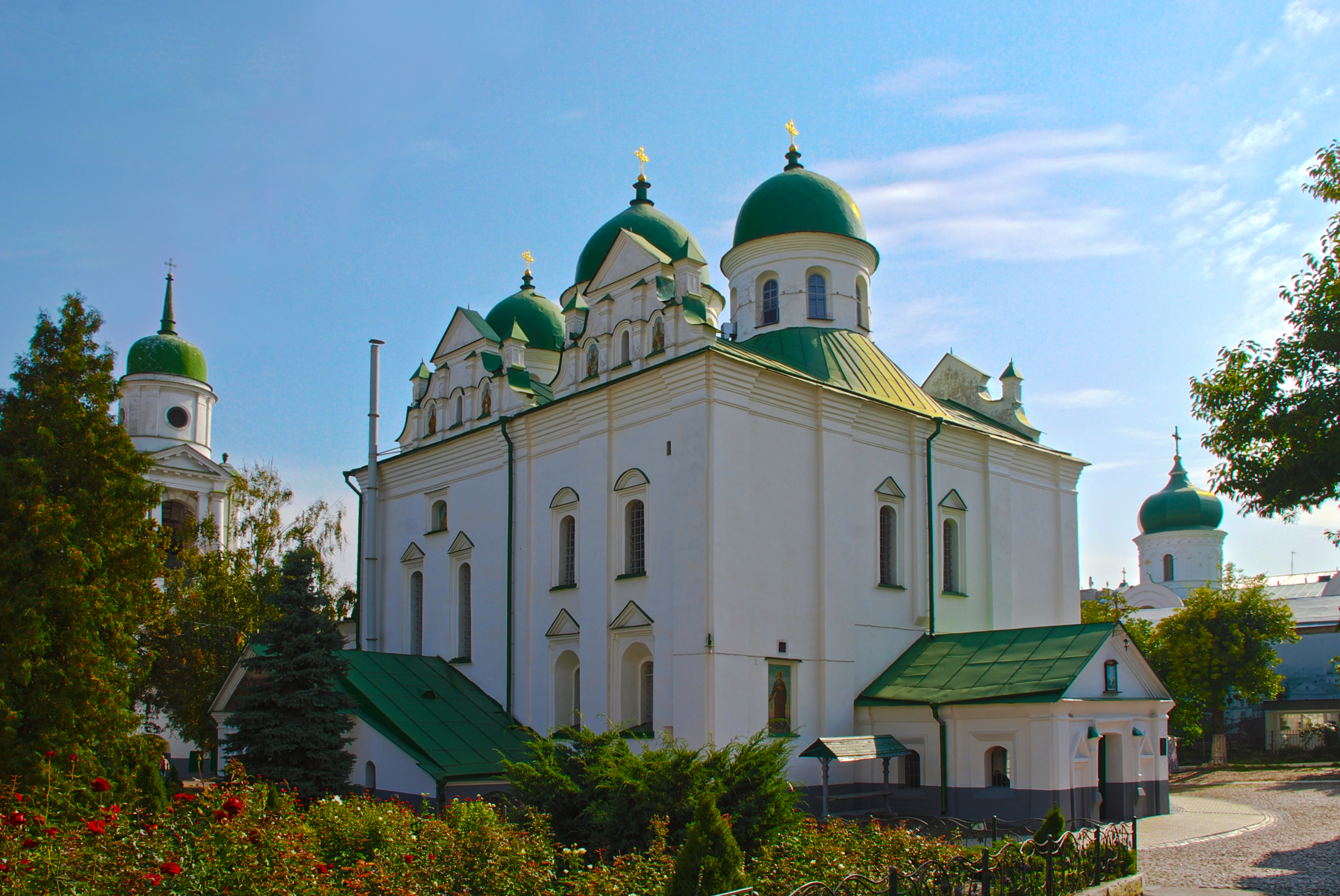
Church of the Assumption at Florivskyi Convent

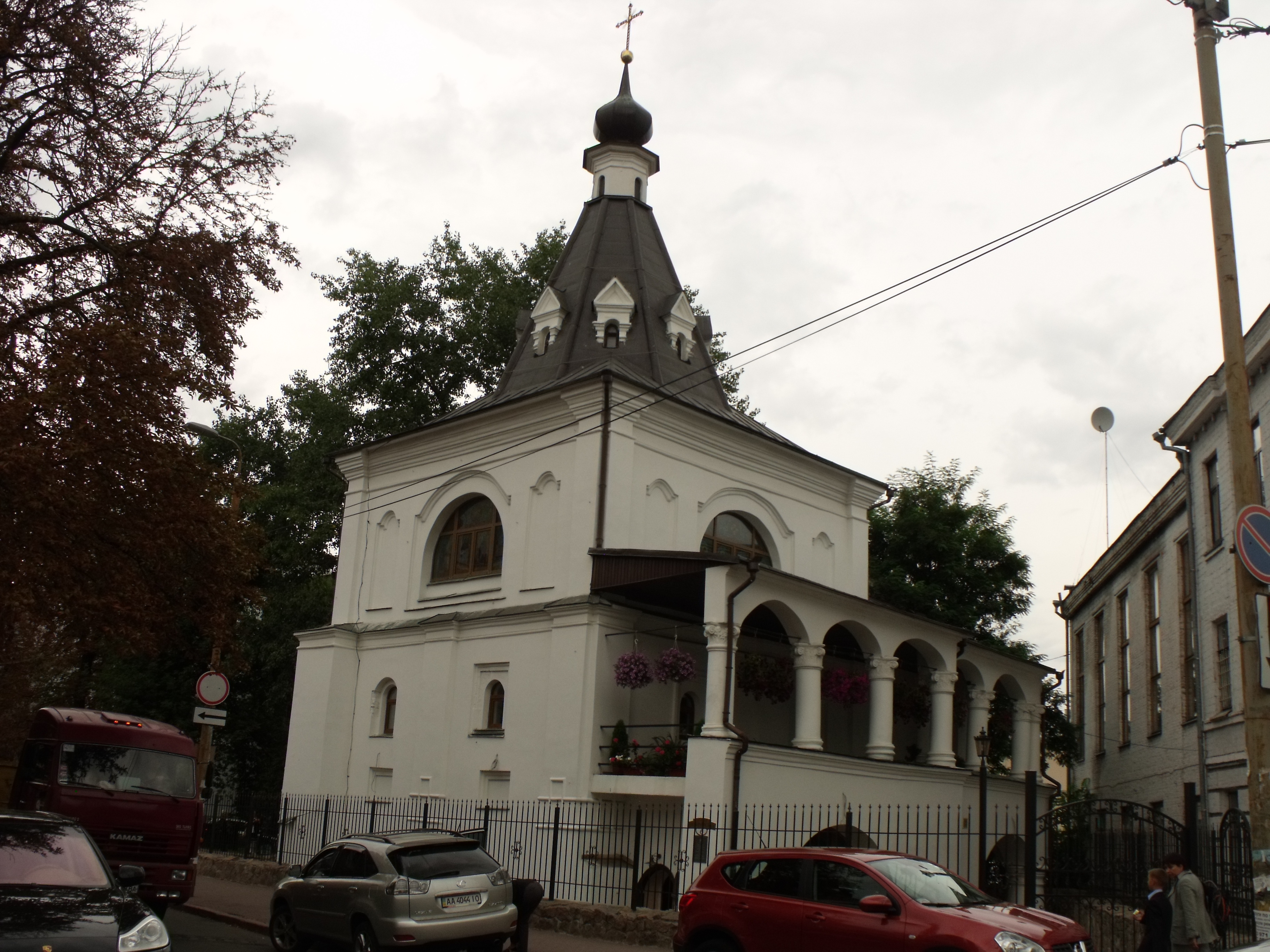
Belltower of St. Nicholas the Good Church

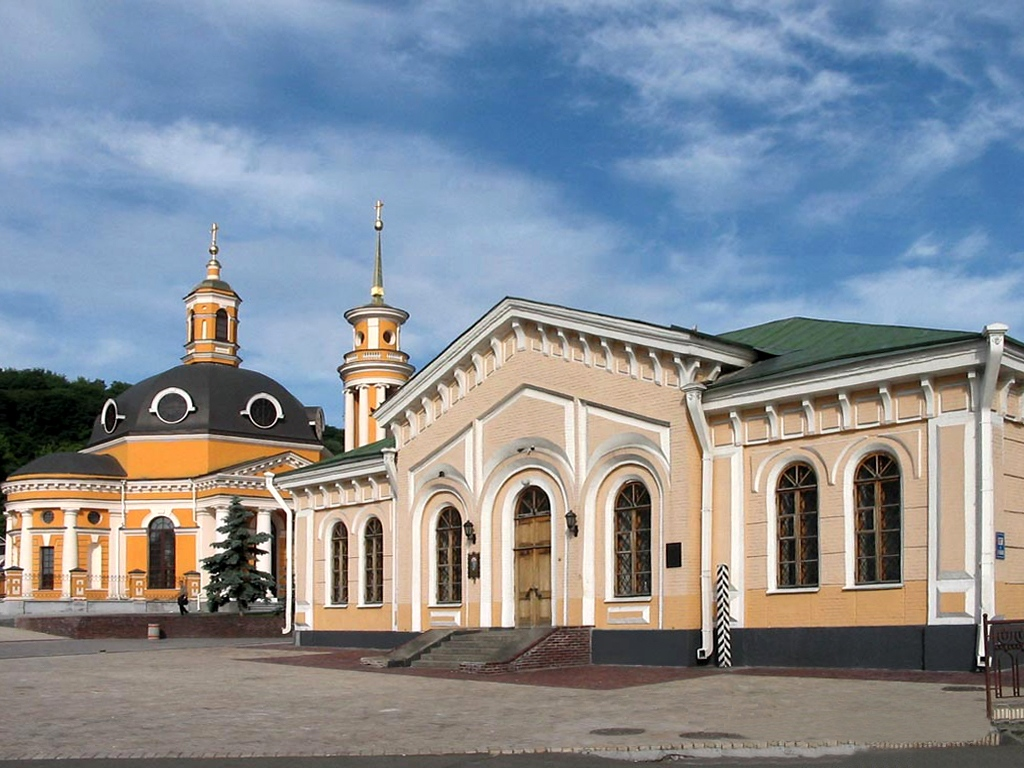
Postal Station and Church of Nativity

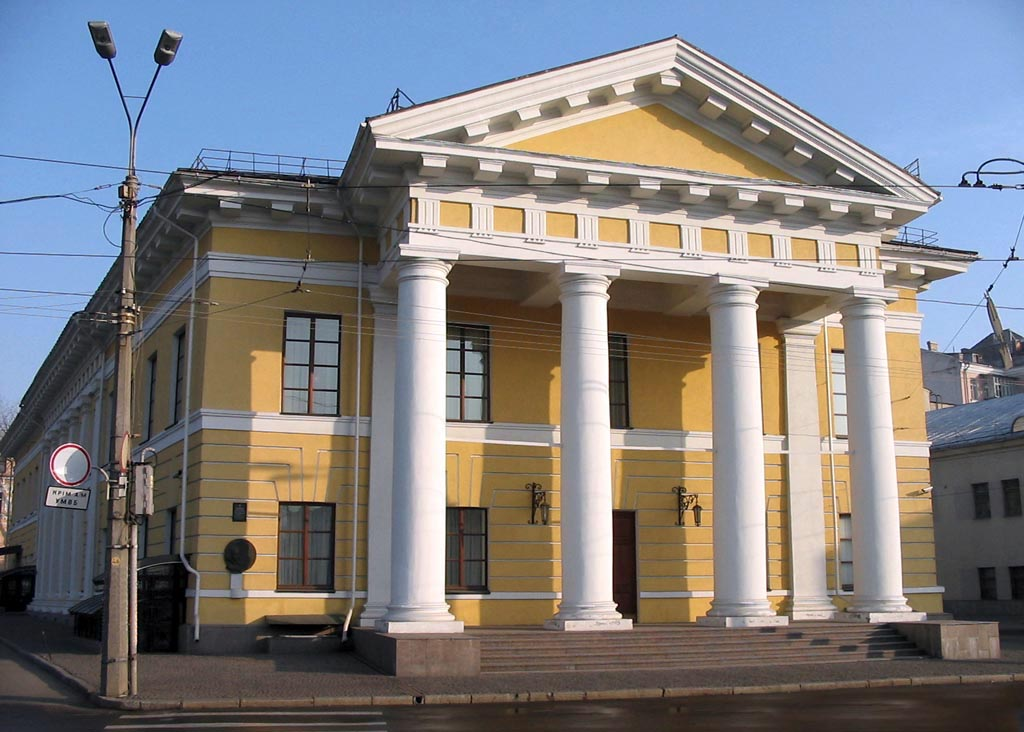
Contracts House

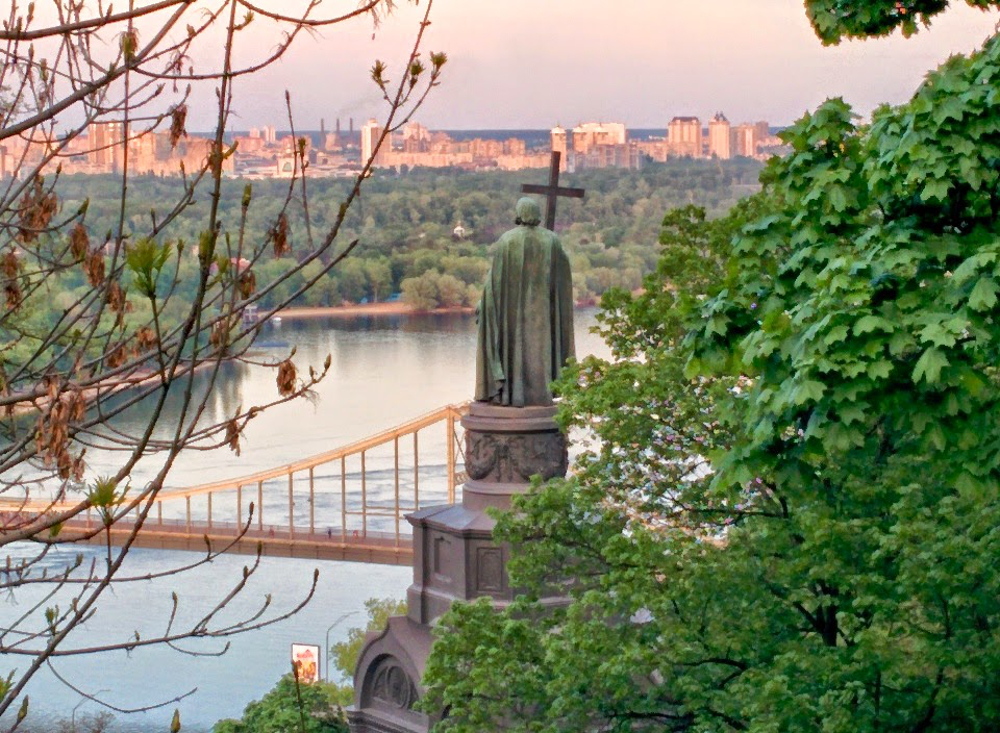
Monument to Vladimir the Great

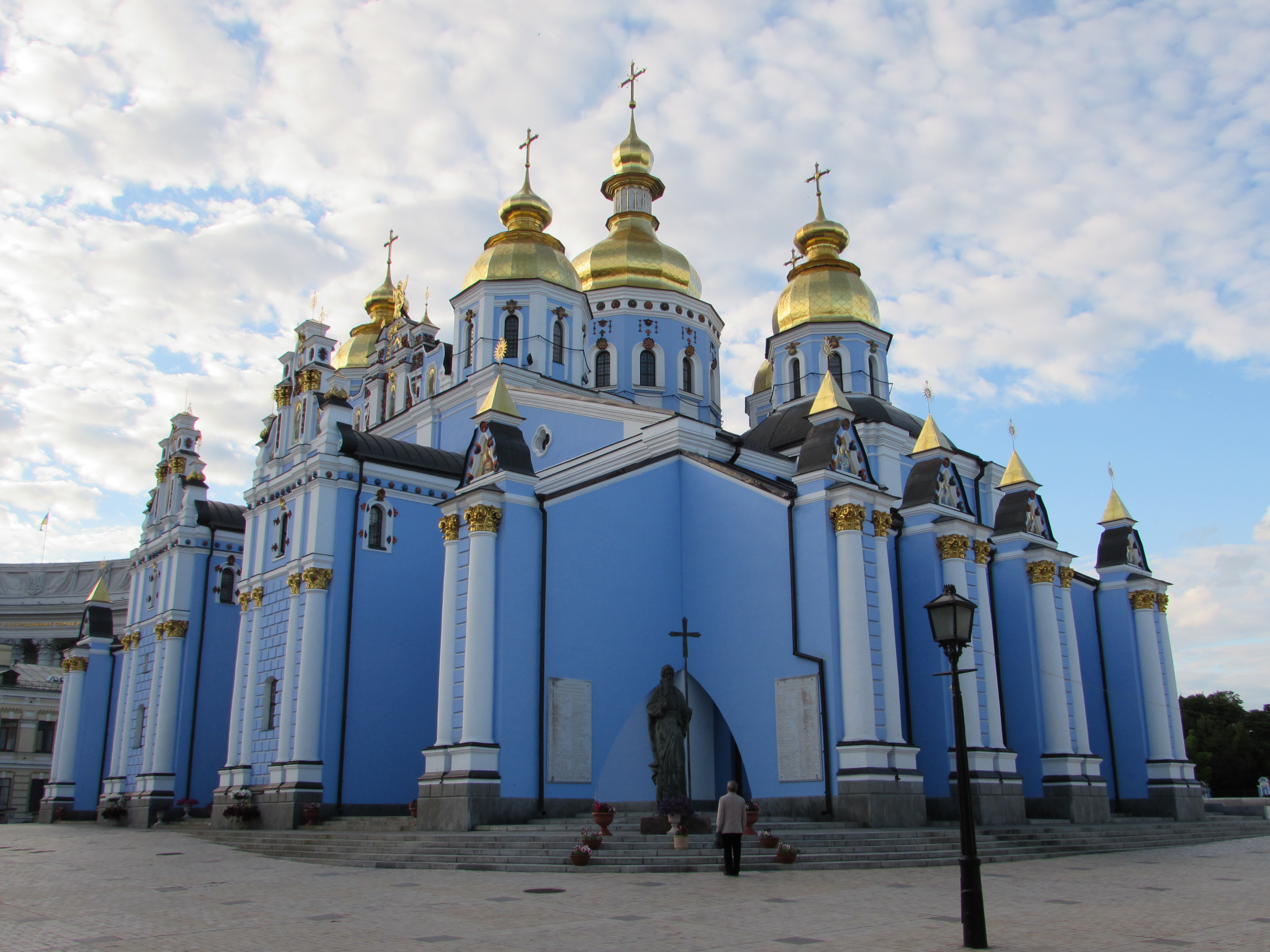
St. Michael's Golden-Domed Cathedral

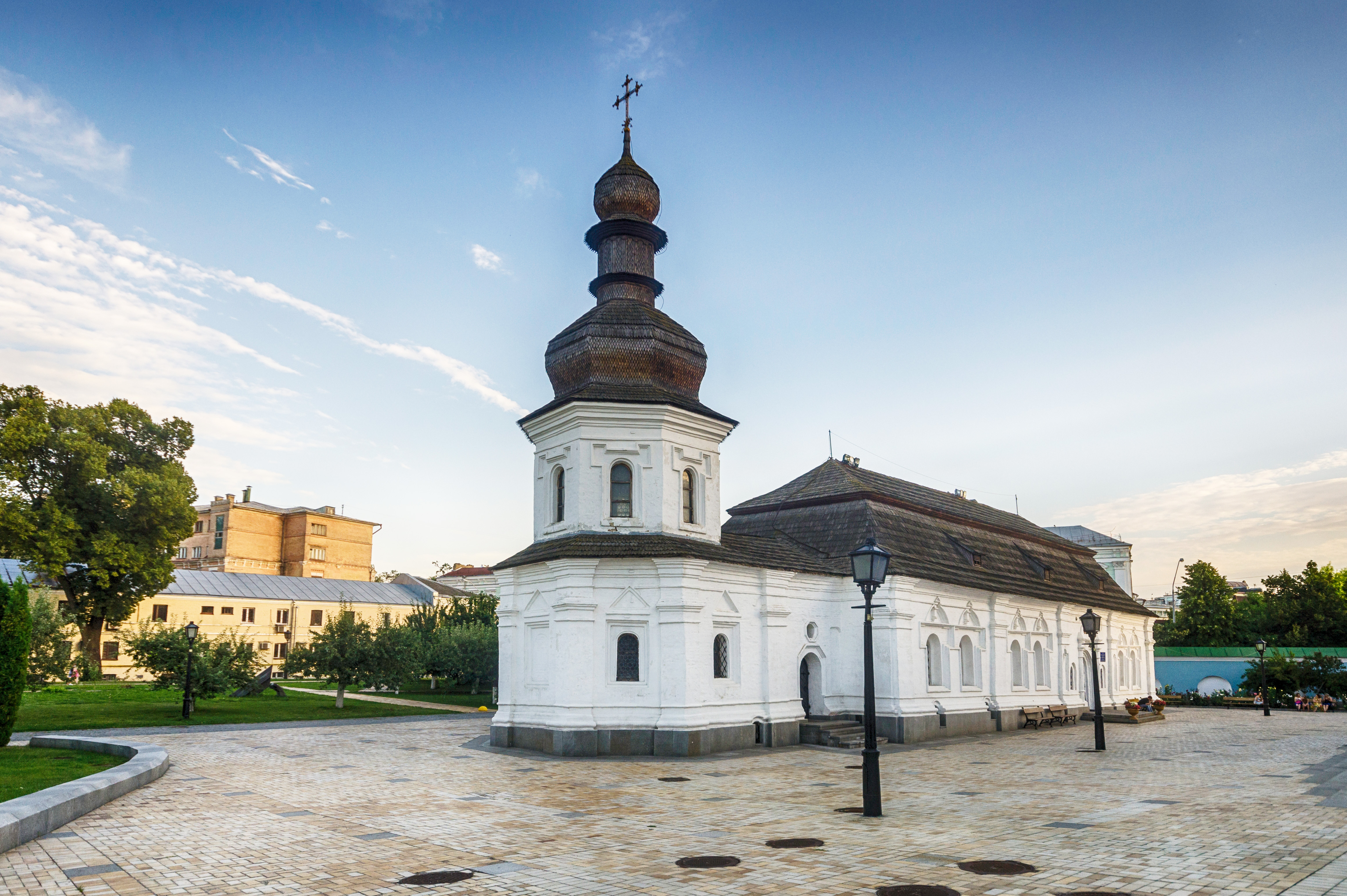
Refectory of St. Michael's Monastery

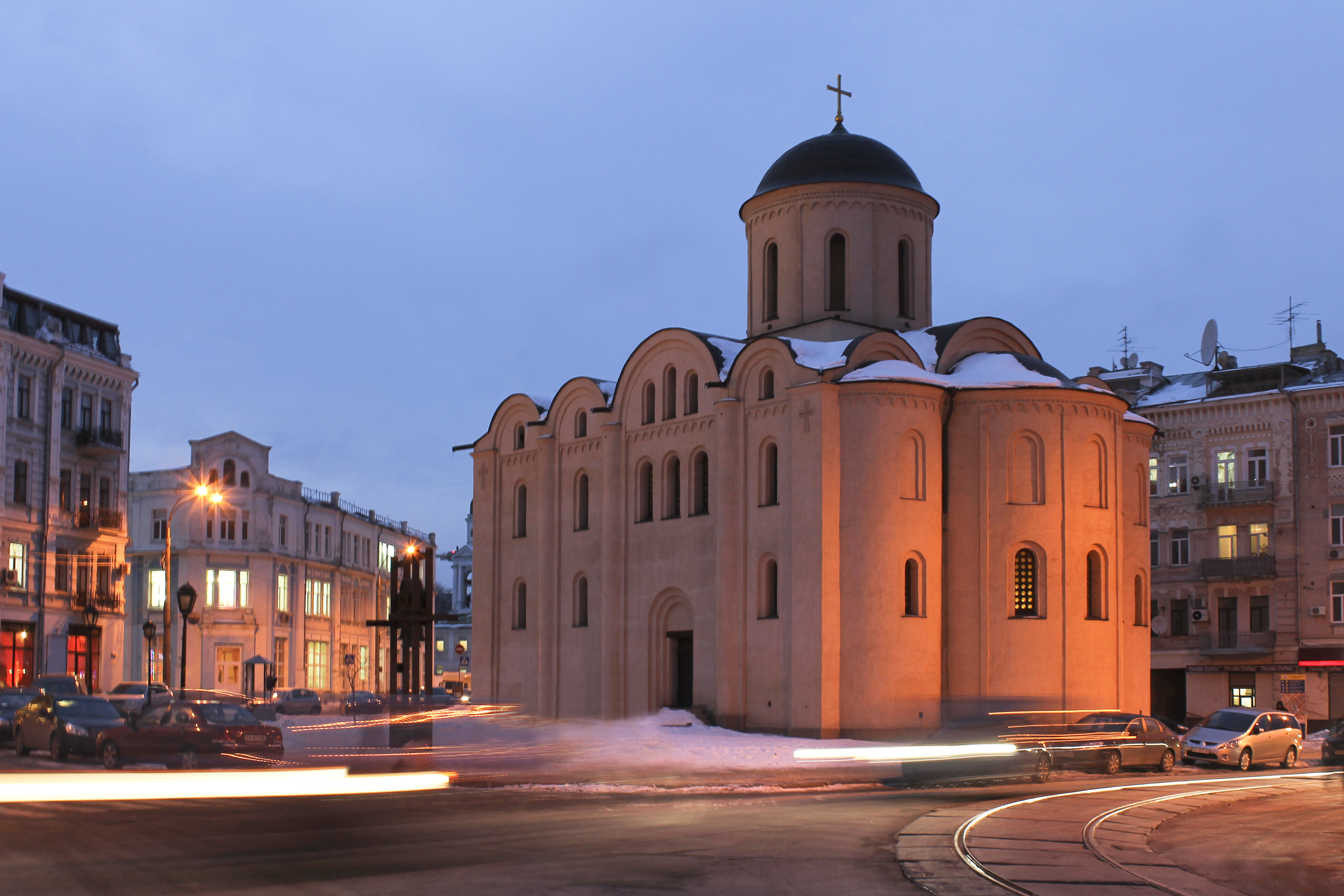
Pyrohoshcha Dormition of the Mother of God Church

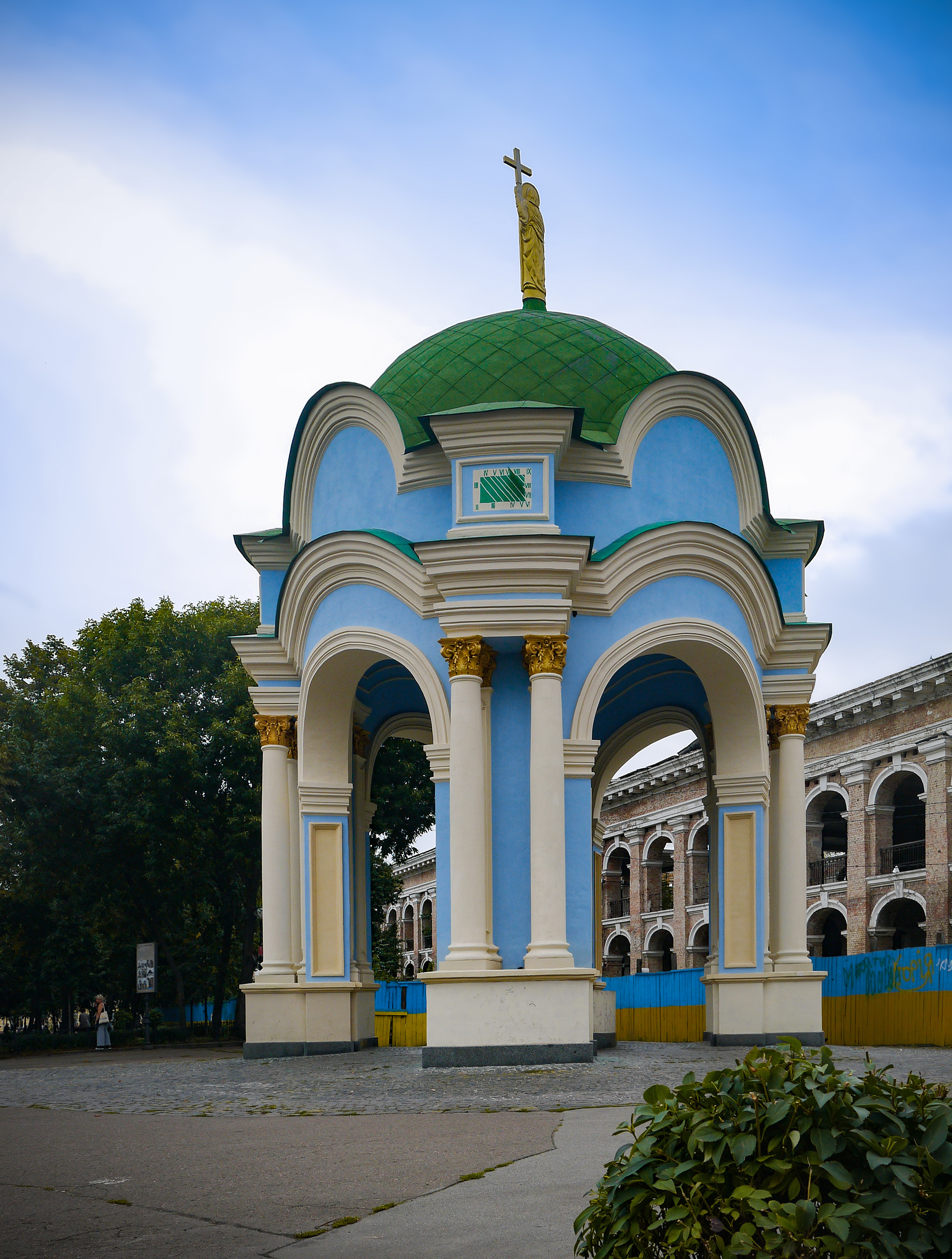
Fountain of Samson

== See also ==
- Kyiv Pechersk Lavra
- National Sanctuary "Sophia of Kyiv"
- List of historic reserves in Ukraine
- Ancient Chernihiv
- Ancient Halych
