= Square of Contracts (Kyiv) =

Square in Kyiv, Ukraine

Coordinates: 50°27′50″N 30°31′5″E

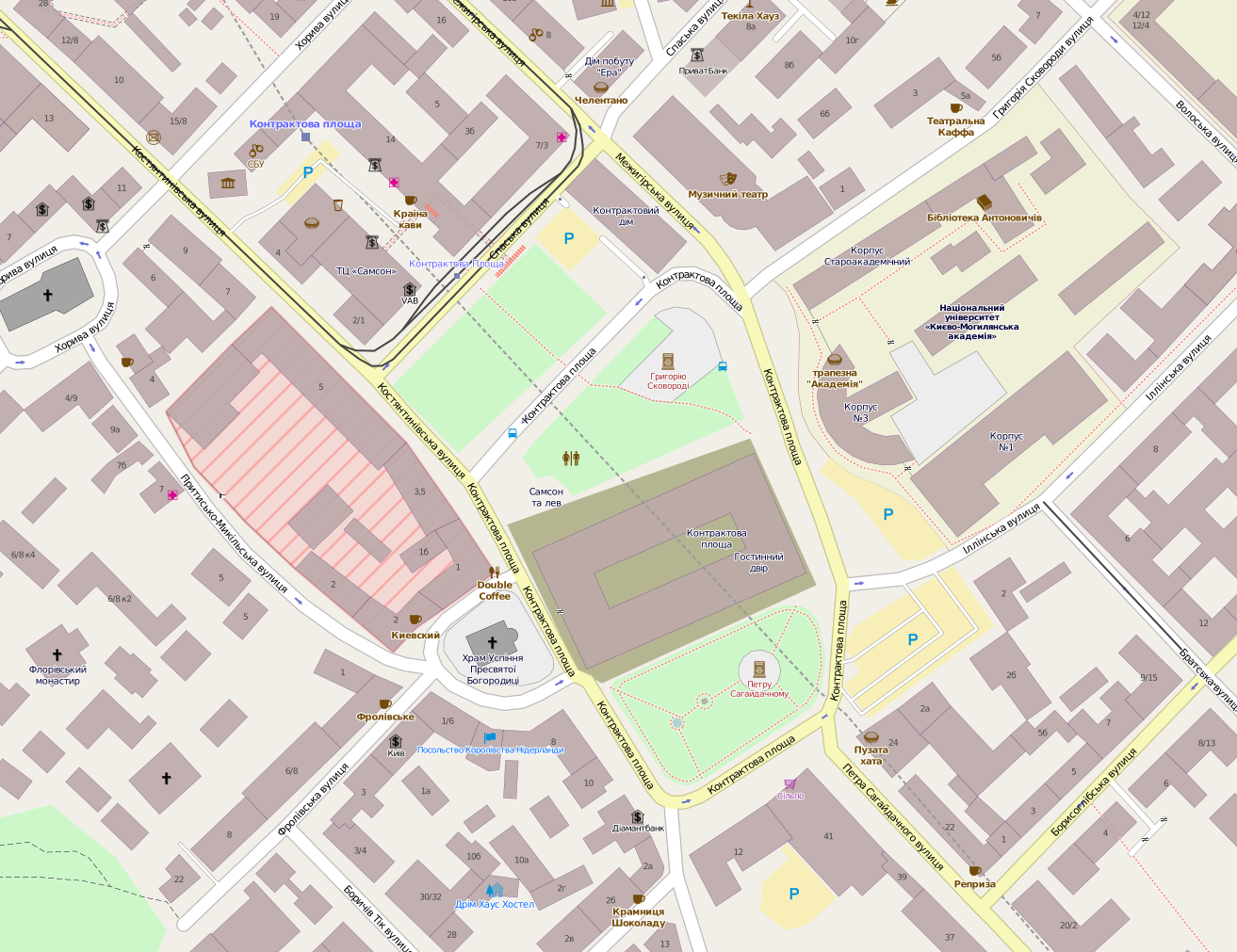
- Map of the Contracts Square in Kyiv
- Interactive map of Square of Contracts
- Type: Square
- Location: Kyiv, Ukraine

Immovable Monument of National Significance of Ukraine
- Official name: Комплекс споруд Контрактової площі (Complex of buildings in the Square of Contracts)
- Type: Urban Planning, Architecture
- Reference no.: 260097-Н

Square of Contracts or Contract Square (Ukrainian: Контрактова площа, romanized: Kontraktova ploshcha, IPA: [kontrɐkˈtɔwɐ ˈplɔʃtʃɐ]) is a square in the historic Podil neighborhood of Kyiv, the capital of Ukraine. The square is an important economic, cultural, and transport center of Podil, containing numerous architectural and historical monuments.

== History ==
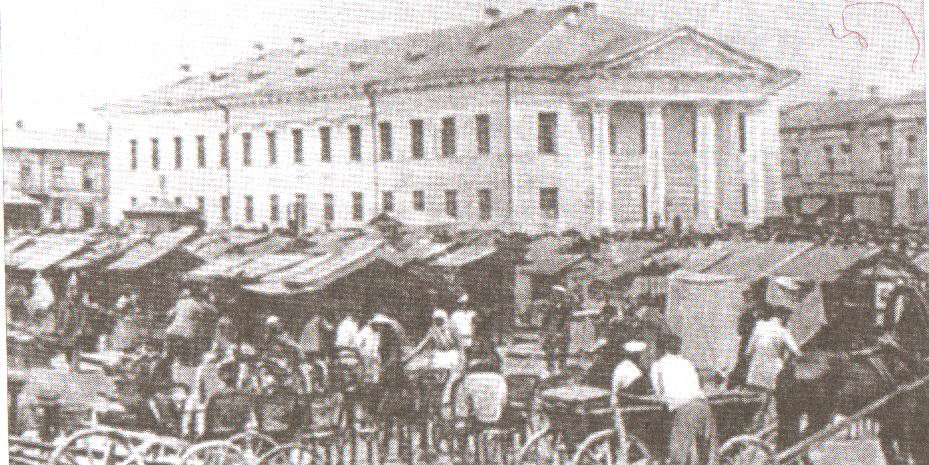
Kyiv Contracts fair during the late 19th century

Contract Square is known since the Kyivan Rus' times as an important part of the Podil merchant neighborhood. The square lies surrounded by the Andriivskyi Descent, Sahaidachny, Pokrovska, Florivska, Prytisko-Mykilska, Kostiantynivska, Mezhyhirska, Spaska, Skovorody and Ilynska streets.

During 1748-1749, the Fountain of Samson was built to repair the water distribution system of the area to a design by Ukrainian architect Ivan Hryhorovych-Barskyi. The compound of the National University of Kyiv-Mohyla Academy, one of Ukraine's leading universities dating back to 16th century, adjoins the square.

The annual trade fair, known as "Contracts", originally took place in Dubno, but was moved to Kyiv in 1798 according to a decree of Paul I of Russia. The trading activities were initially organized in the second half of January, around the time of Epiphany feast, but starting from mid-19th century that period was moved to February, and became known as "Candlemas fair". The square received its current name in 1817, after the construction of the Contracts House, a permanent trading center where contracts were signed.

The Contracts Fair was the biggest such event in Ukraine, and attracted merchants and noblemen from many surrounding areas and countries. The main commodity sold at the fair was grain, although starting from the 1840s sugar also became a popular article. Additionally, participants of the fair could sign various deals and agreements concerning sale or rent of estates, hiring of servants, supply of materials, creation of companies etc. Many balls, concerts and theatrical plays were organized as part of the event, frequently involving foreign guests as performers. During the 1850s, a daily newspaper was issued during the period of Contracts.

After reaching its peak during the 1820s, starting from the late 1830s the annual fair gradually lost its importance due to competition from Kharkiv and Odesa. Other factors in its decline were the opening of a stock exchange in Kyiv and the introduction of railways. Following the establishment of Soviet rule, the fair became obsolete, resulting in its abolition in 1927.

In the 1970s, archaeological works conducted by the Institute of Archaeology of the Ukrainian SSR were done on the square, as well as reconstructions of the square's main constructions.

The square was renamed several times during its history: in 1869-1919 the square was named Alexander Square in honour of the Russian emperor Alexander II; in 1919-1944 it was named Red Square, dedicated to Communism; between 1945 and the 1950s, it was renamed back to Contracts, although Red continued to be widely used among elder people; in 1990, the original name was re-established.

== Modern square ==
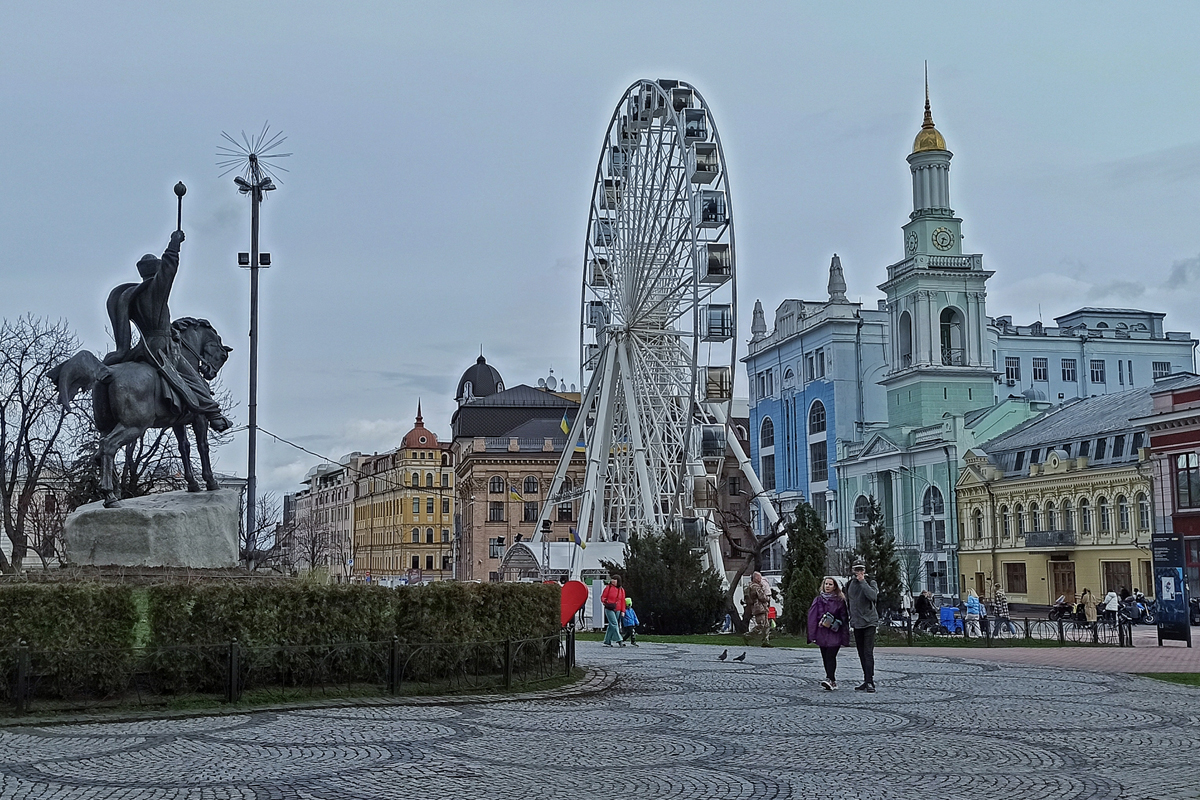
Modern view of the square's southeastern side with the monument to Petro Sahaidachnyi on the left

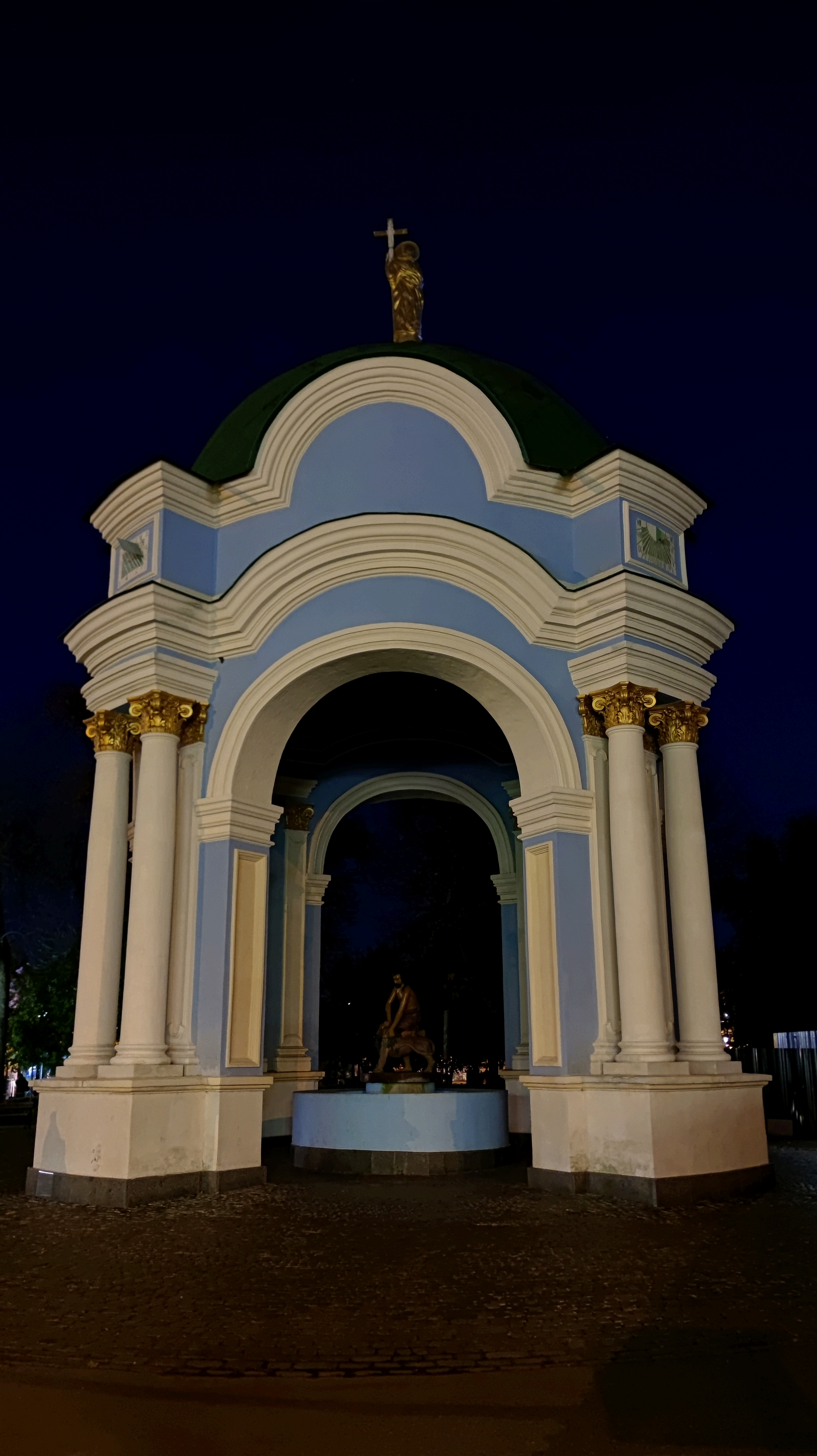
Fountain of Samson

Today, the Contracts Square is an important center of the Podil neighborhood, and also a recreational, cultural and transportation point of the city.

The square is often used for various outdoor public festivities, including music concerts and fairs. The Petro Sahaidachnyi Street which leads to the square is limited to pedestrians on weekends.

=== Buildings and structures ===
Listed clockwise from the Sahaidachnyi Street:

- Monument to Petro Konashevych-Sahaidachny, a Cossack Hetman;
- Hosting Court building of the 19th century and the main feature of the town square;
- Contracts House, where contracts were signed;
- Fountain of Samson, reconstructed architectural monument;
- Children's Musical Theater;
- Monument to Hryhoriy Skovoroda, a poet, philosopher, and composer;
- Compound of the Kyiv-Mohyla Academy (including Soros Center for Contemporary Art in the corner building);
- Building of the National Bank's city branch (formerly the "Greek Monastery");
- Church of the Mother of God Pyrohoshcha.

=== Transportation center ===
Contracts Square is one of the largest and oldest transport hub of the Kyiv tram system, end stop for several tram routes. However, tram lines crossing the square are being gradually phased out since the 1980s.

Most importantly, Contracts Square adjoins the Kyiv Metro Kontraktova Ploshcha Station ( Obolonsko–Teremkivska line), thus forming a multi-modal passenger knot with the tram and minibus lines. The station has a sub-surface design with four entrances, two of them being outside the square.

== Gallery ==
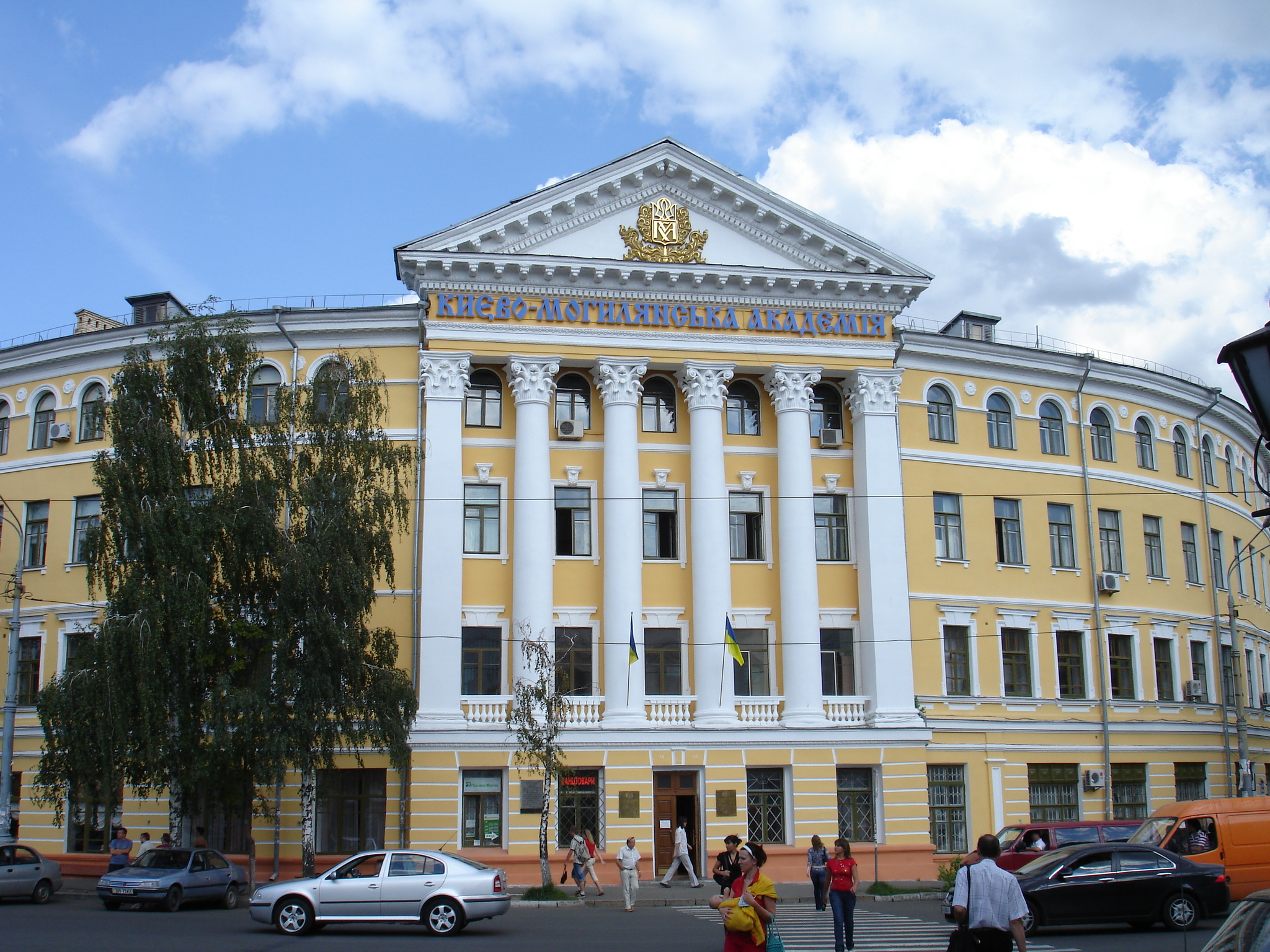
Main entrance to the National University of Kyiv-Mohyla Academy.

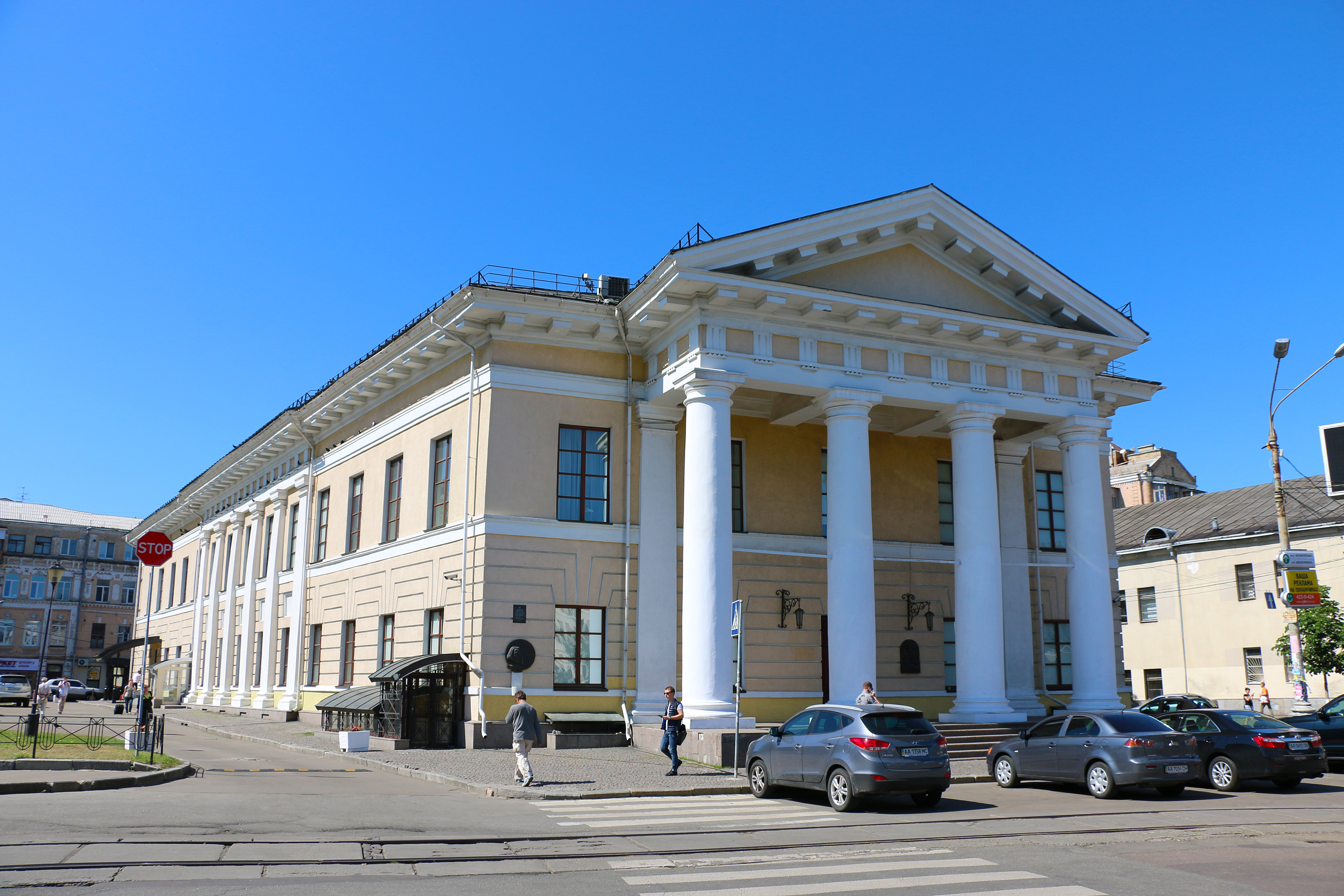
Contracts House

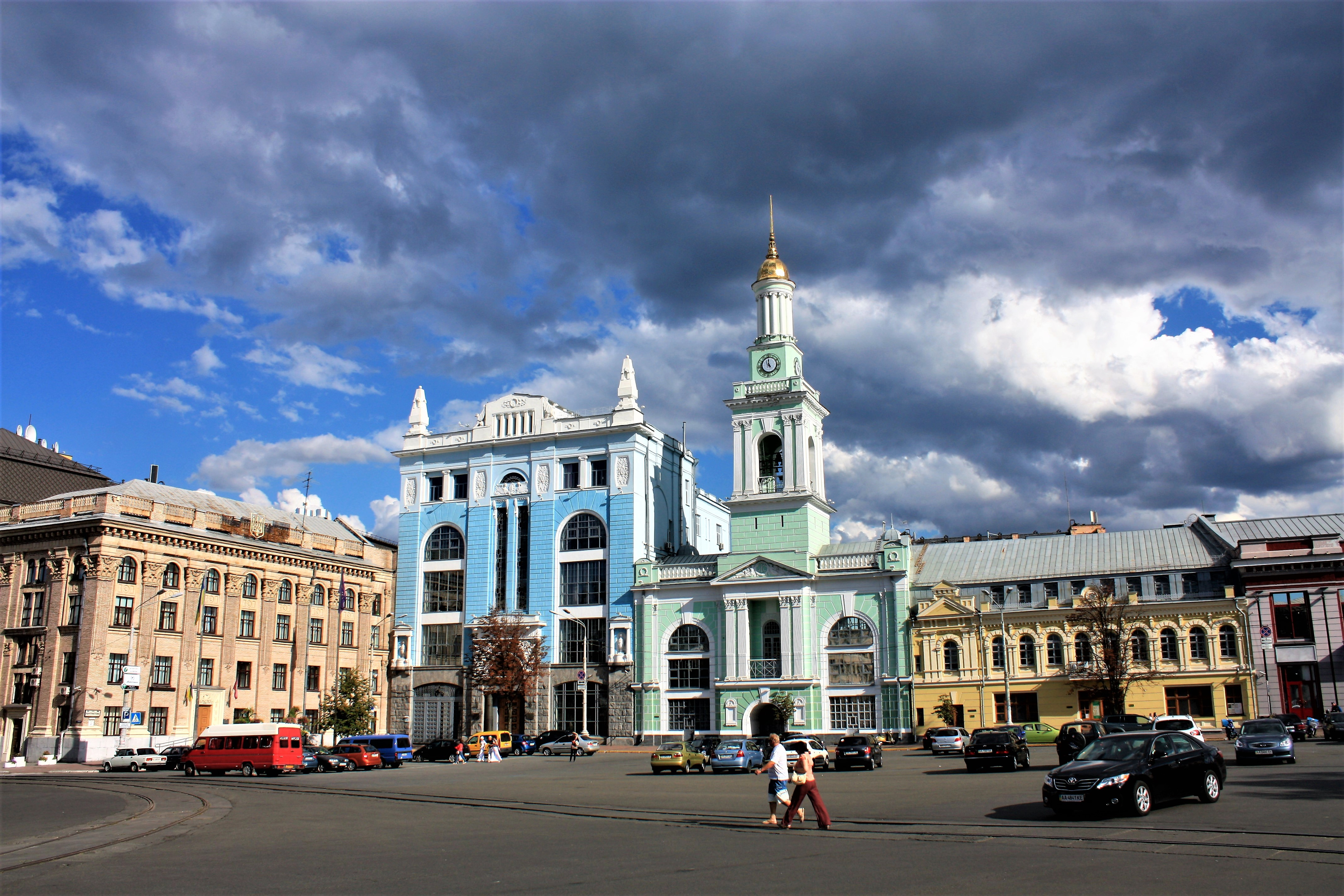
The former Greek Monastery on the square (center). The building currently hosts the city branch of the National Bank.

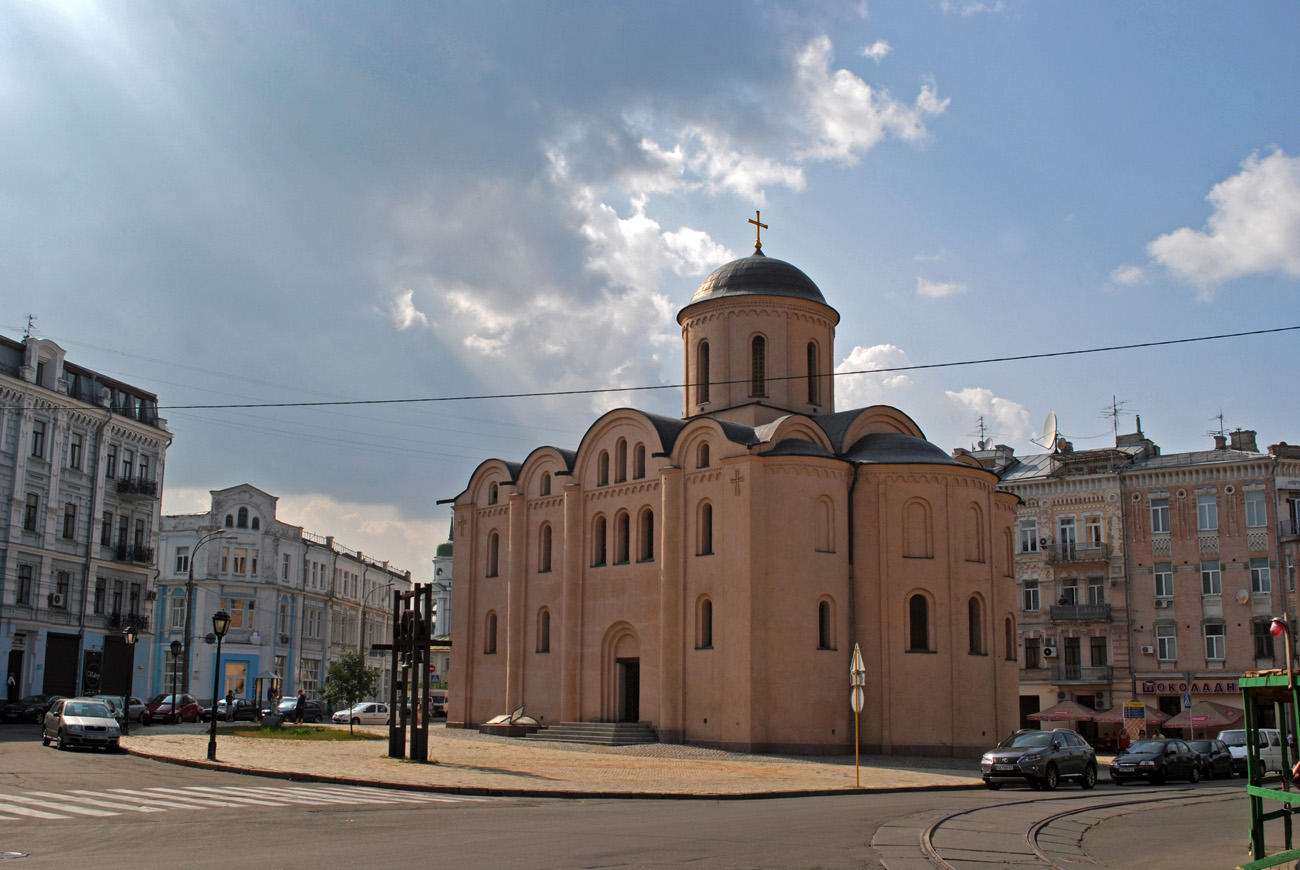
The central church of Podil - The Pyrohoshcha Dormition of the Mother of God Church, 1132, ruined by the Soviets in 1935, rebuilt in 1998

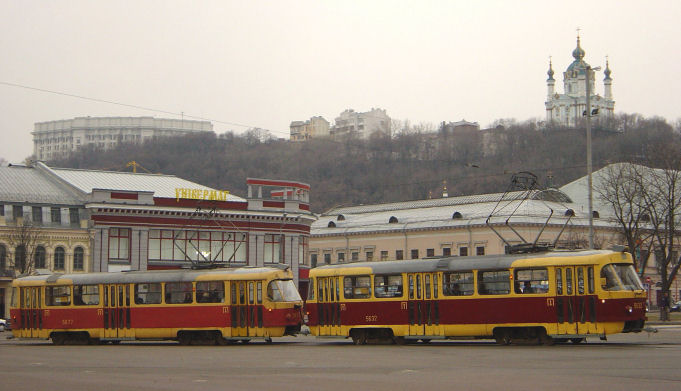
Two Kyiv tram cars on the square, seen with the roofs of the St. Andrew's Church in the background.

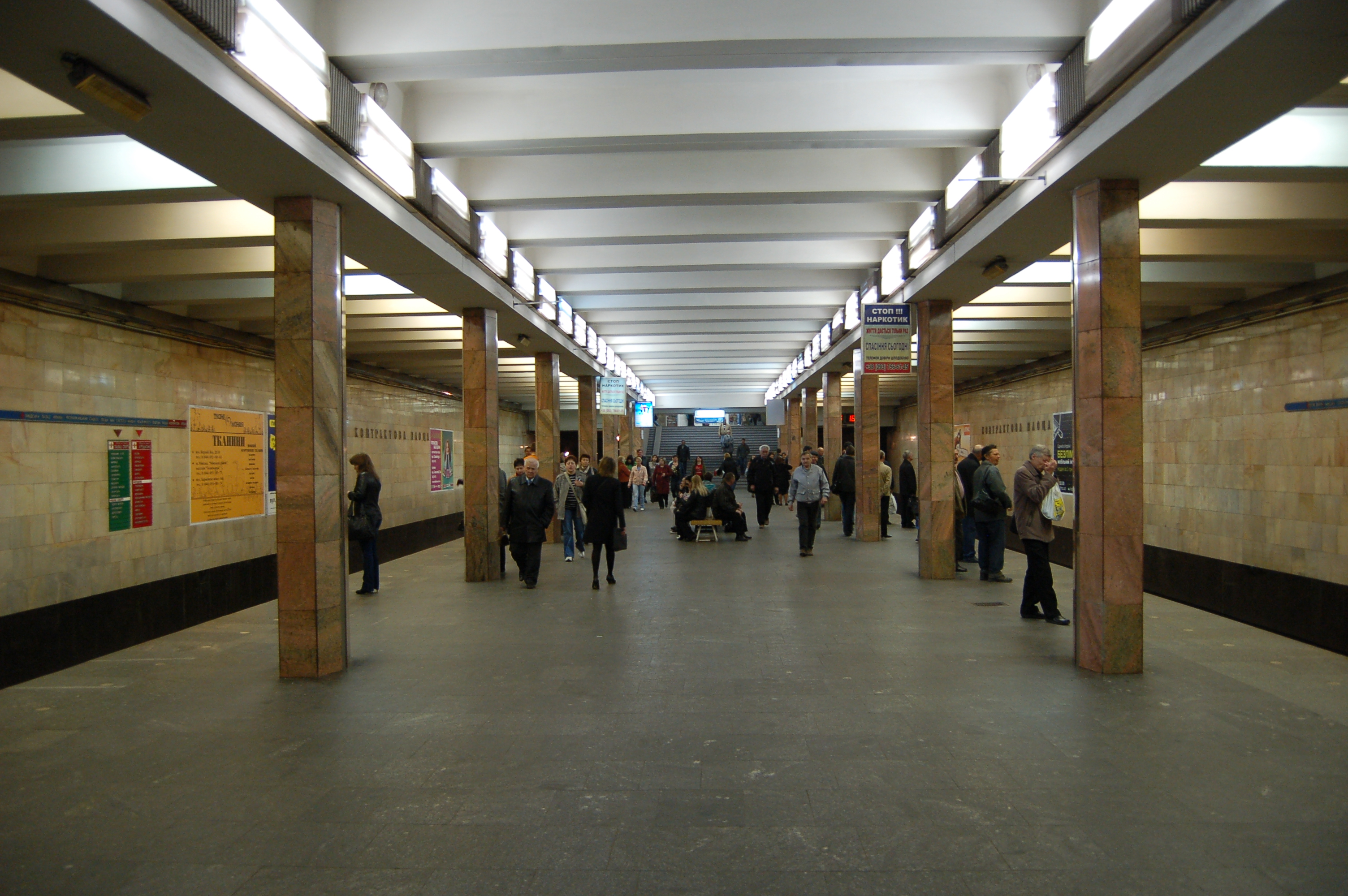
Inside the Kontraktova Ploshcha Metro Station.

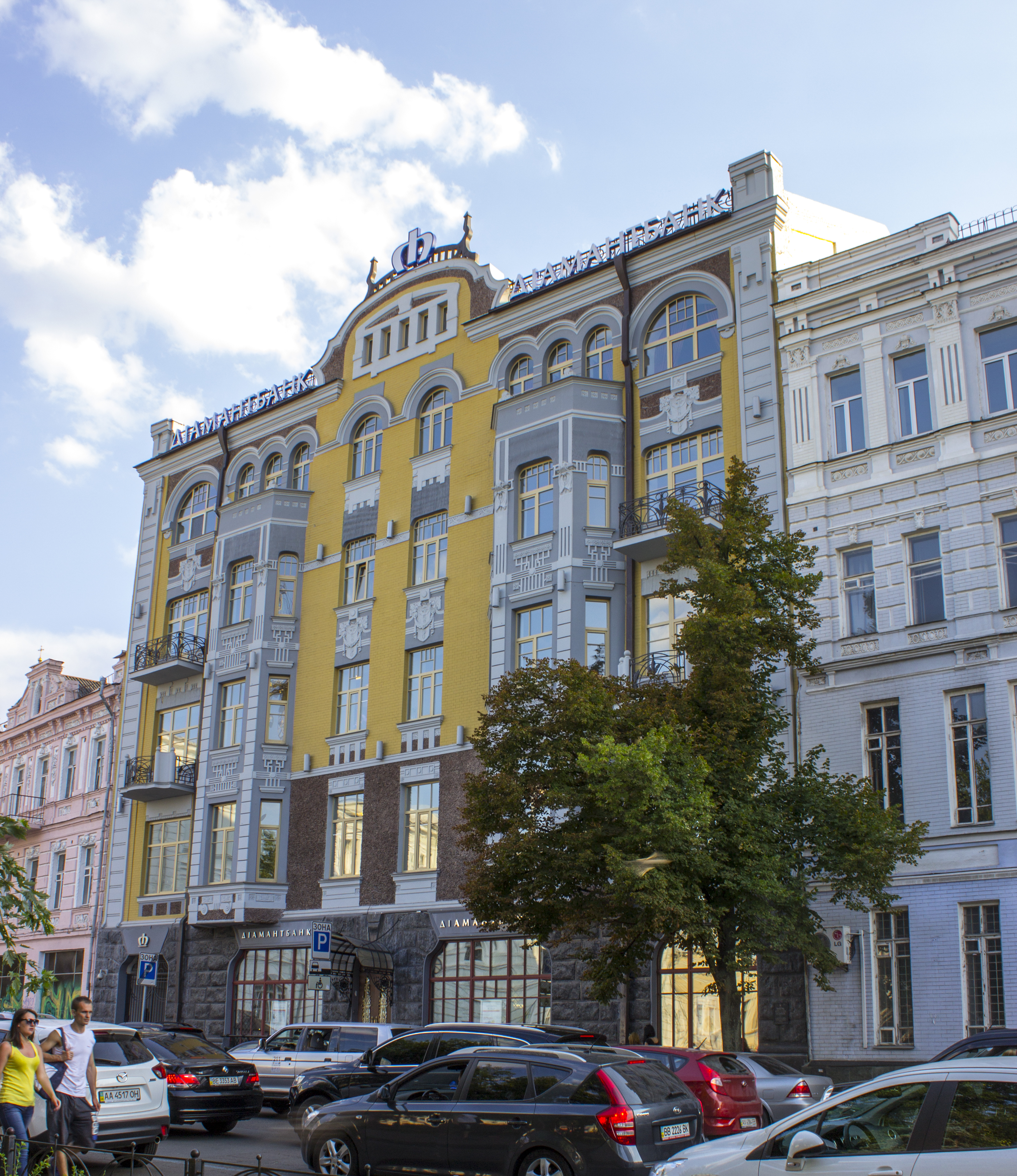
One of the revenue houses in the square

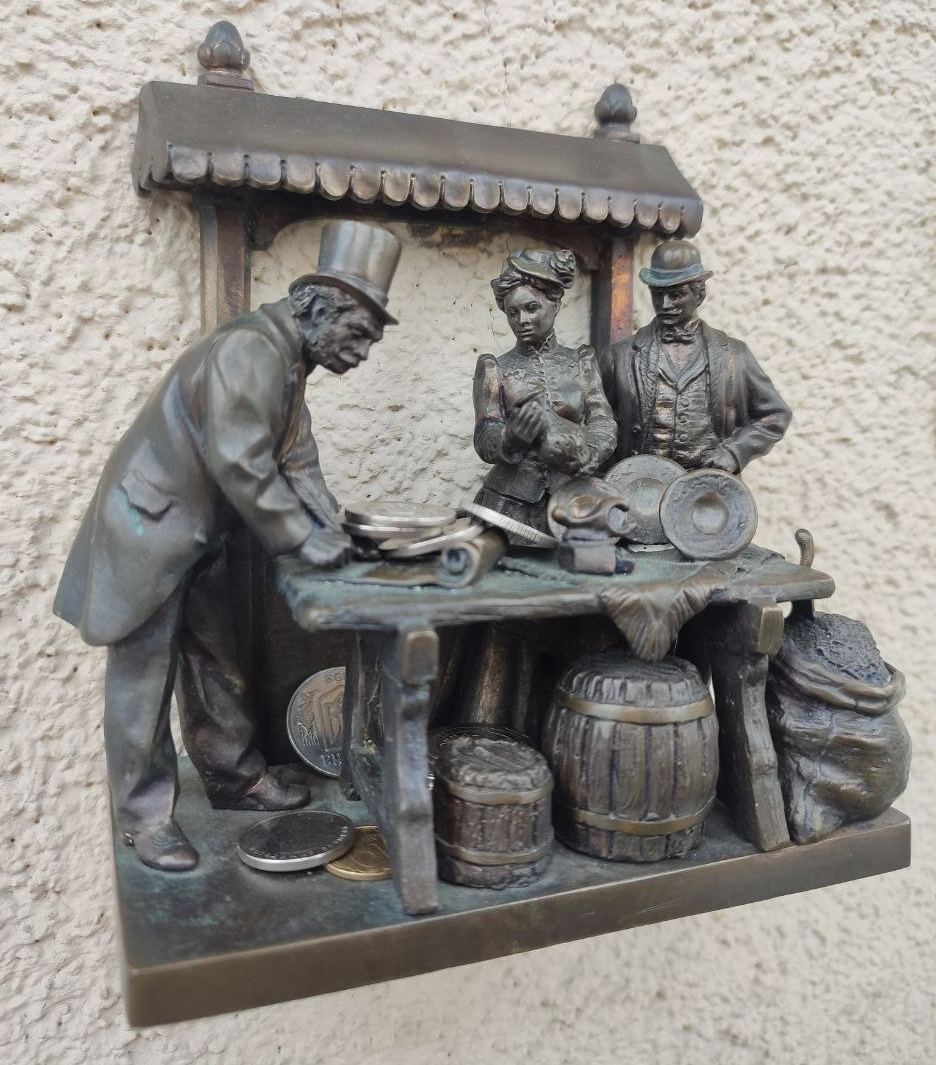
A miniature sculpture commemorating the Contracts fair in the square
