= Vasil Grigorovich-Barsky =

Ukrainian Orthodox monk (1701–1747)

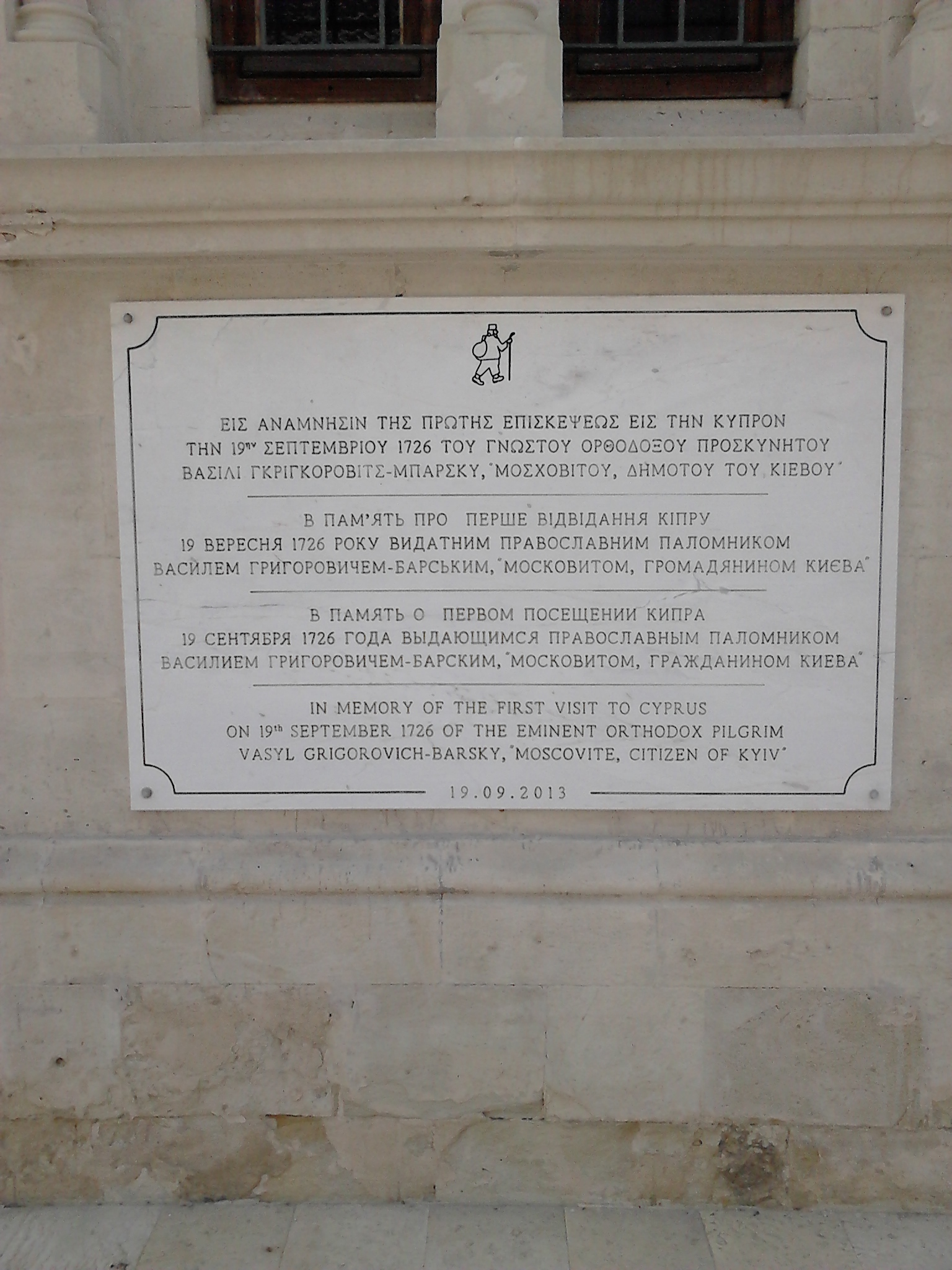
Plaque commemorating Vasyl Grigorovich-Barsky's visit to Cyprus, Agia Napa Cathedral, Limassol.

Vasil Grigorievich Grigorovich-Barsky (Ukrainian: Василь Григорович Григорович-Барський, romanized: Vasyl Hryhorovych Hryhorovych-Barsky; Russian: Василий Григорьевич Григорович-Барский; born 1 (N.S. 12) January 1701 - died 7 (18) October 1747) was an Eastern Orthodox monk and traveller from Kiev. He spent more than 20 years travelling around Southern Europe and the Middle East, leaving an autobiographic account of his journeys.

He is best remembered as a scholar who stayed at Hilandar twice, in 1725 and 1744. From the scholarly perspective, the more important was his second visit, when he wrote a detailed description of Hilandar and its antiquities.

His first name may be romanized as Basil, Vasili, Vasyl or Vasil.

== Biography ==
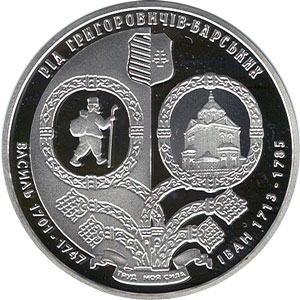
Vasyl Grigorovich-Barsky (left) depicted on a Ukrainian coin

Grigorovich-Barsky was born in Kiev or in Litky near Kiev, then part of the Russian Empire. He came from a rich merchant family originally from the town of Bar in Podillia. Vasyl's younger brother Ivan Grihorovich-Barsky became a well-known architect. Before 1710, the family moved to Kyiv, where Vasyl's father served as a prefect of Pyrohoshcha Church. Against his father's will, Vasyl enlisted in the Kyiv-Mohyla Academy. However, in 1723 he had to leave the studies due to ill health and traveled to Lviv (then part of the Polish–Lithuanian Commonwealth) to seek medical advice. There Grigorovich-Barsky, disguised as a Uniate, became a student in a Jesuit academy.

In 1724, after a conflict at the academy, Grigorovich-Barsky left Lviv and started his journey, during which he visited Pest, Vienna, Bari, Rome, Venice, Corfu, Mount Athos, Palestine, Egypt and Cyprus. In Alexandria Grigorovich-Barsky lived at the court of the Patriarch. In 1729–1731 he stayed in Tripoli, learning Greek. In 1734, in Damascus, he was tonsured a monk with the name Basil and ordained a subdeacon by Patriarch Sylvester of Antioch. From October 1734 to April 1735, at the request of the Archbishop Philotheos of Cyprus, he taught Latin in a local school in Cyprus and lived in the archbishop's farmstead.

From 1736 to 1743 he lived on the island of Patmos, where he continued to study language, logic and metaphysics and at the same time taught Latin at a local school. In 1743 he was appointed a priest at the Russian embassy in Constantinople by empress Yelizaveta Petrovna, and for the next two years studied documents in the libraries of Mount Athos.

Vasyl Grigorovich-Barsky was in Athos, Athens and Crete from 1744 to 1746. He returned to Constantinople in 1746, where he had a conflict with the new Russian diplomat, Adrian Ivanovich Neplyuev, who accused him for Philhellenism and betrayal of national interests. Vasyl was afraid to be arrested and wanted to prove the injustice of accusation against him. He returned to Kiev in the 2d of October 1747 through Bulgaria, Wallachia and Poland. As he was severe ill at that time, he died a month later.

His image is described by his brother and placed in the preface to the first edition of his notes: “There is no portrait of this father Vasily, but he was of the following signs: he is tall, the hair on his head and beard is black without any gray hair, his face is dark, his body is portly, his eyebrows are black, high, large and almost together converged, eyes are sharp, brown, nose is short; both in dress, and in the pronunciation of speeches and posture, he looked like a Greek; why his own mother, upon his return to the house after 24 years of travel, could not find out even after an hour in conversations; in other things, he had a cheerful and playful disposition, was curious about all kinds of sciences and arts, and especially to drawing, and from childhood he had a desire to see foreign countries, and he did it by the very deed".

A detailed biography of V. Grigorovich-Barsky is set out in the preface to the full edition of his book by the publisher N.P. Barsukov, which was also published as a separate book.

== History of the publication of the book by Vasily Grigorovich-Barsky ==
For the first time, an excerpt from the book by V. Grigorovich-Barsky was published by Vasily Ruban in the magazine Parnassian Haberdasher (Russian: Парнасский щепетильник) in 1770.

In 1778, Vasily Ruban, on behalf of Count Potemkin, published the book in his own edition under the title "The Pedestrian Vasily Grigorovich-Barsky-Plaka-Albov, a native of Kiev, a monk of Antioch, Journey to the Holy Places in Europe, Asia and Africa: undertaken in 1723, and completed in 1747."

Over the course of half a century, Vasily Ruban's edition was republished in whole or in parts, and at the end of the 19th century Nikolai Barsukov prepared a complete scholarly edition for the Imperial Orthodox Palestine Society, entitled "The Wanderings of Vasily Grigorovich Barsky in the Holy Places of the East from 1723 to 1747" (Published in 1885-1887).

In 1989, the edition "Barsky's Cyprus revisited, 1726-1989" was published in Cyprus, containing an English translation of Vasily Grigorovich-Barsky's text on Cyprus. It was prepared by Ian Meadows and Ionia Evthyvoulou.

In post-Soviet Russia, several reprint editions of "Wanderings" were published.

In Ukraine in 2000, a translation of the book into Ukrainian by Petro Bilous was published, "Trips to the Holy Places from 1723 to 1747".

In 2009, the publication "Βασίλι Γκρηγκόροβιτς Μπάρσκι Τα ταξίδια του στο Άγιον Όρος: 1725-1726, 1744-1745 / Με τη φροντίδα και τα σχόλια του ακαδημαϊκού Παύλου Mυλωνά", was published in Greece containing a translation into Greek of the text by V. Grigorovich-Barsky about his travels around Athos.

In France in 2019, a translation into French was published: Vassili GRIGOROVITCH-BARSKI. Pérégrinations (1723-1747) / Traduit du russe par Myriam Odayski.

In Russia in 2024-2025, two parts of the "Wanderings" were presented in a translation into modern Russian, made by the physician Leonid Bulanov for the Imperial Orthodox Palestine Society.
