= Hostynnyi Dvir (Kyiv) =

Coordinates: 50.463917°N 30.518056°E

- Гостинний двір
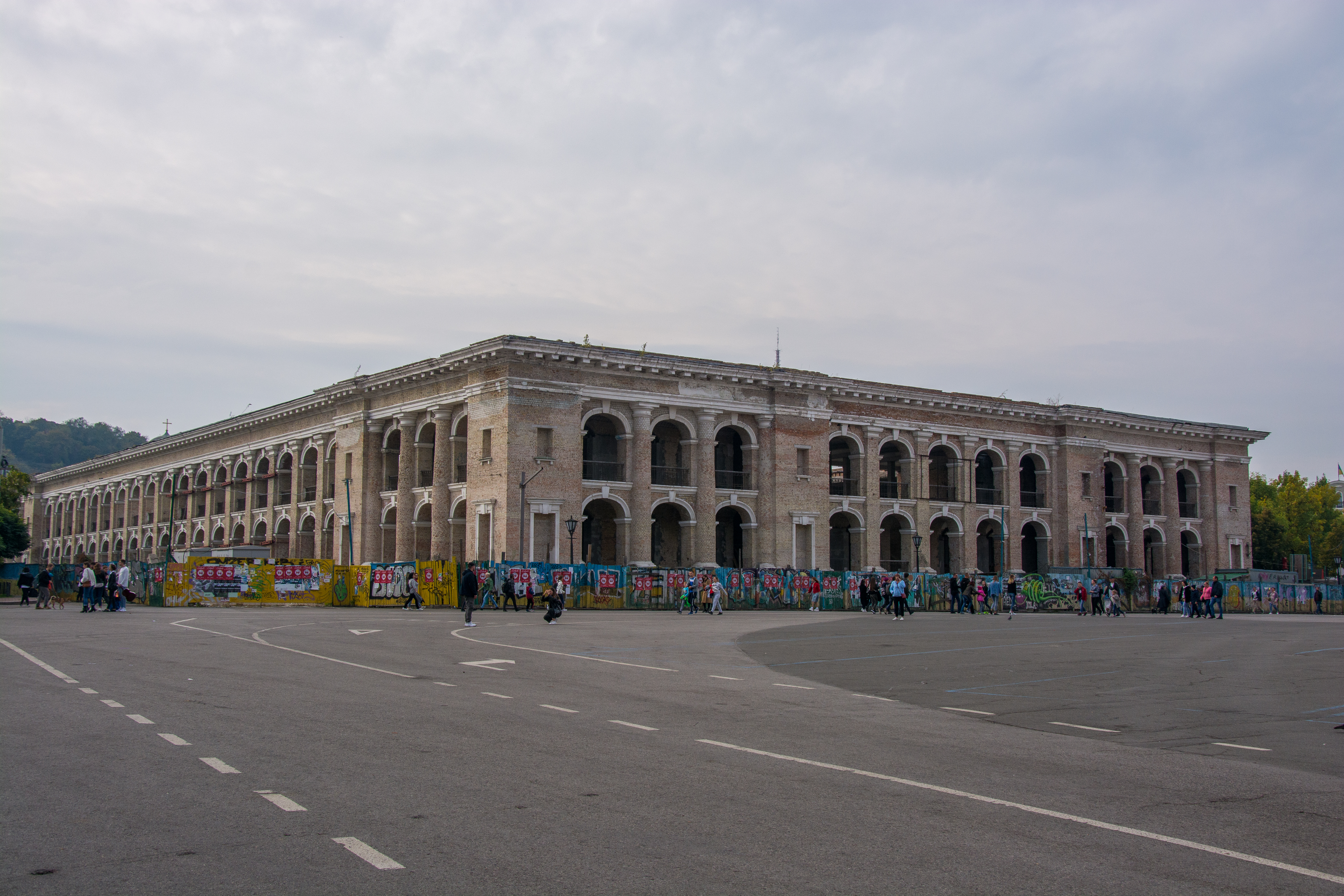
- Hostynnyi Dvir in 2019
- Interactive map of the Hostynnyi Dvir area

General information
- Status: under reconstruction
- Architectural style: neoclassicism
- Location: Kontraktova Square 4
- Construction started: 1809
- Completed: 1813
- Renovated: 1828–1833; 1983–1990; 2013–present
- Owner: Ministry of Culture and Strategic Communications

Design and construction
- Architects: Luigi Rusca; Andrey Melensky; Valentyna Shevchenko; Andriy Myrhorodskyi

Immovable Monument of Local Significance of Ukraine
- Official name: Гостинний двір (за проектними матеріалами ар. Л.Руска, 1809 р.) (Hostynnyi Dvir (according to project material by arch. L. Rusca, 1809))
- Type: Architecture, Urban Planning
- Reference no.: 947-Кв

Hostynnyi Dvir (Ukrainian: Гостинний двір [ɦoˈstɪnːɪj ˈd⁽ʲ⁾wir]; Russian: Гостиный двор, Gostiny dvor) is a trade complex (hosting court) built in Kyiv, Ukraine (at the time part of the Russian Empire) back in 1813 by Luigi Rusca.

The interpretation of name in two languages is different due to semantics of both. Literally in the Russian language the word means a goods court, while in the Ukrainian language⁣ — a welcome court. The complex was built as part of many complexes that were built in cities of the Russian Empire.

Located at the Kontraktova Ploshcha (Contracts Square), in the historical neighborhood of Podil, the building is the central piece of the squares architectural ensemble, many buildings of which are also included in the Historical-Architectural Reserve "Ancient Kyiv".

== History ==
=== Background ===
The original merchant house type complex in Kyiv was built in the 1760s at Podil by the project of Ivan Hryhorovych-Barskyi, but with time it became too small due to increase of trading, so in the 1790s it was decided to organize an additional marketplace on a square nearby. Due to contract fairs it had been called Kontraktova Ploshcha (Contracts Square).

21 November 1808 the market was completely destroyed by fire and the merchants society had to ask a civil governor to approve a construction of a stone merchant house. Neoclassical architect Luigi Rusca was chosen to develop a new two-storey trade complex to be located on the square. The construction was planned to be controlled by the construction expedition.

=== Construction by the original project ===
10 August 1809 the project of Luigi Rusca was approved and 18 September the foundation was laid. A mistake made while building a foundation caused the subsidence and cracks on the walls. The mistake was fixed in 1811.

In July 1811 there was a fire at Podil which firefighters could not extinguish quickly and due to neighborhood mostly consisting of wooden buildings and a windy season it had turned into a a three-day-long disaster. Because of that, the building's construction of was stopped. Only one storey was built at the time, so in 1813 it was covered by a roof. Despite being unfinished Hostynnyi Dvir was opened and had started working.

=== First reconstruction ===
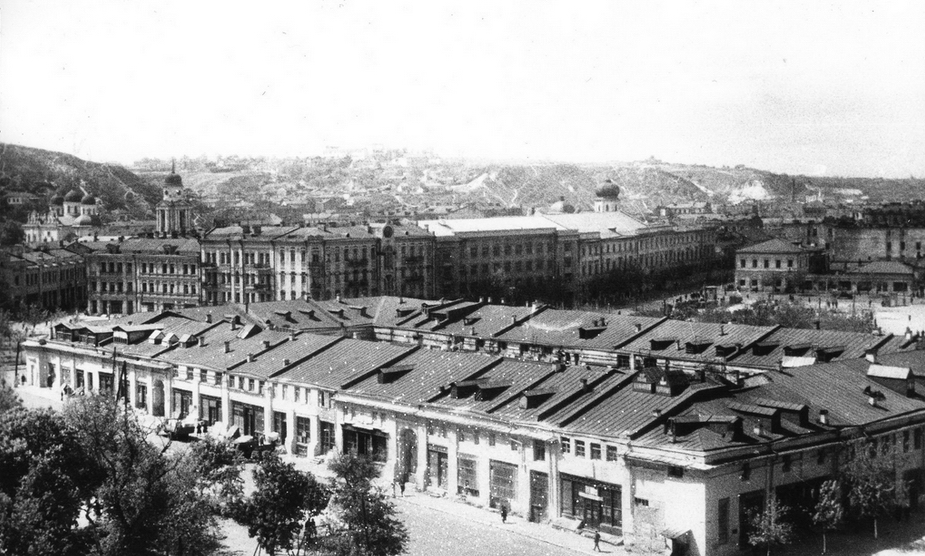
Hostynnyi Dvir in 1920

As of 1820s the building was in a bad state and needed a reconstruction. New project was developed by Andrey Melensky, it featured an empire architecture and a second floor. The project was very different from the original, it was made in 1825 and after some modifications was approved in 1826.

The reconstruction had started in 1829 when Melensky left his job due to illness. Industrialists from merchant court were supplying the construction materials. It was planned to end the reconstruction in 1830, but for various reasons it lasted until 1833. After being opened, some parts of the building were modified in the next years. In the beginning of XX century the second floor was enlarged by lowering the first one, it was made to increase the space for trade.

During the Soviet era, the building was heavily modified, losing its original facade. During World War II Hostynnyi Dvir was abandoned and in a 1947 city master plan it was planned to be demolished, however the building was saved and continued to work. In 70s the metro line was built to Podil and due to underground work the merchant court got a subsidence.

=== Renovation ===
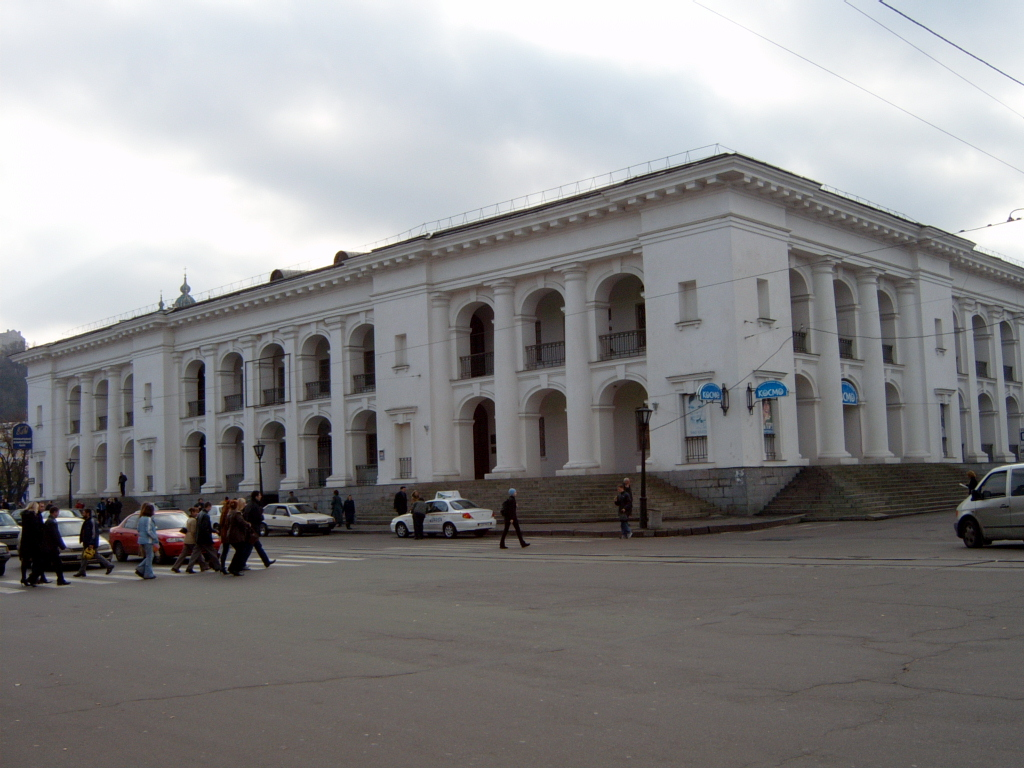
Rebuilt Hostynnyi Dvir in 2012

It was planned to restore the building, but nobody wanted to work on it since it was in a dangerous state. Valentyna Shevchenko and Yurii Losytskyi developed a reconstruction project based on Luigi Rusca's original one found in the archive. In 1979 Hostynnyi Dvir became a part of an architectural heritage. However, it couldn't be easily repaired due to damage, so it was decided to demolish the old building and build a new one using the original project.

The renovation had started in 1983, one half of a building was demolished and in 1985 it was rebuilt, becoming a home for the Zabolotny Library of Architecture. Next year's Chernobyl disaster caused the money redirection, so the work on Hostynnyi Dvir had to slow down. In 1987 the remaining parts of the old building were destroyed, and the renovation was completed in 1990. Despite being newly built, the merchant court retained its status of an architectural heritage.

In 1994, a music video of the People's Artist of Ukraine Pavlo Zibrov «Білий цвіт на калині» was filmed in Hostynnyi Dvir with the participation of People's Artists of Ukraine: Ivo Bobul, Lilia Sandulesu, Vitaly Bilonozhko and Svitlana Bilonozhko.

=== Illegal privatization and a second reconstruction ===
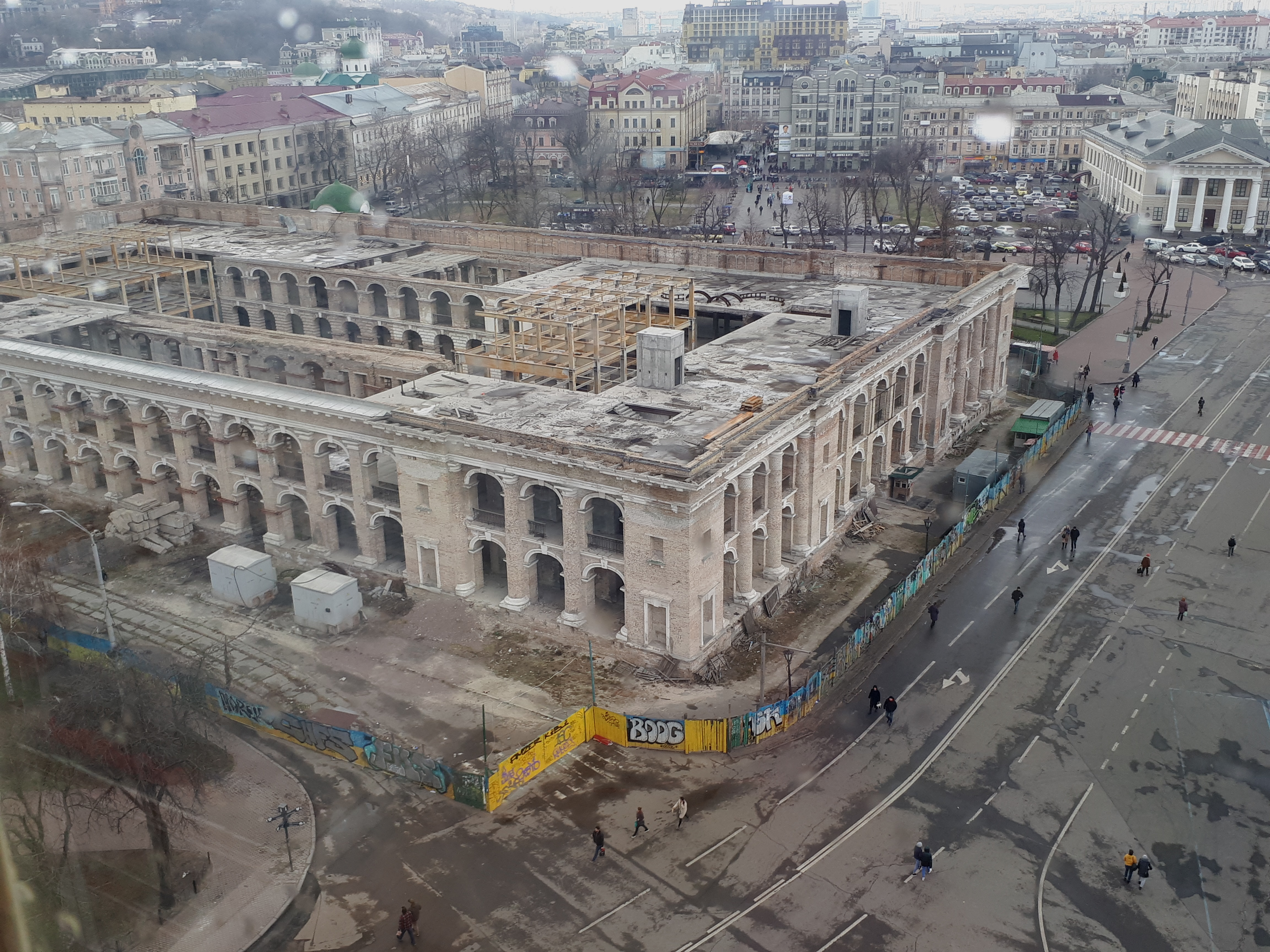
Abandoned Hostynnyi Dvir without roof in 2019

In 1994 the building was leased to Ukrrestavratsiia company, that promised to keep the building in a good state, but in fact planned to open a shopping mall in it.

In 2011, it was excluded from architectural heritage, next year it was approved to reconstruct it into a shopping mall with offices and parking. The new project of Andriy Myrhorodskyi featured a third floor and a glass roof over the court. The project was criticised by an architect of a previous renovation, Valentyna Shevchenko. The project also caused activists of Zberezhy Staryi Kyiv (Save the Old Kyiv) and Pravo Na Misto (Right on City) to begin the protest at the court of Hostynnyi Dvir, they've called the actions an 'alternative Kyiv City Day celebration'. That didn't stop the developer from starting the land preparation work.

In the night of 8 February 2013 the roof of Hostynnyi Dvir caught fire. Firefighters were extinguishing it for six hours and as a result the building was seriously damaged. As a result all the tenants of the merchant court were resettled as the building needed reconstruction. It is believed that the fire was caused by the developer that immediately started to reconstruct the building by a controversial project.

Since 18 February, activists began to protest against the developer, but the Berkut special unit brutally dispersed the action, arresting some protesters. The illegal reconstruction was continuing with its roof being dismantled and a construction right in the middle of the court beginning, however the Revolution of Dignity had started in Ukraine later that year and the work had to be stopped in February 2014. That month the trials against Ukrrestavratsiia had started and later the approval of the reconstruction was canceled and their ownership of the building was decided to be illegal.

== Gallery ==
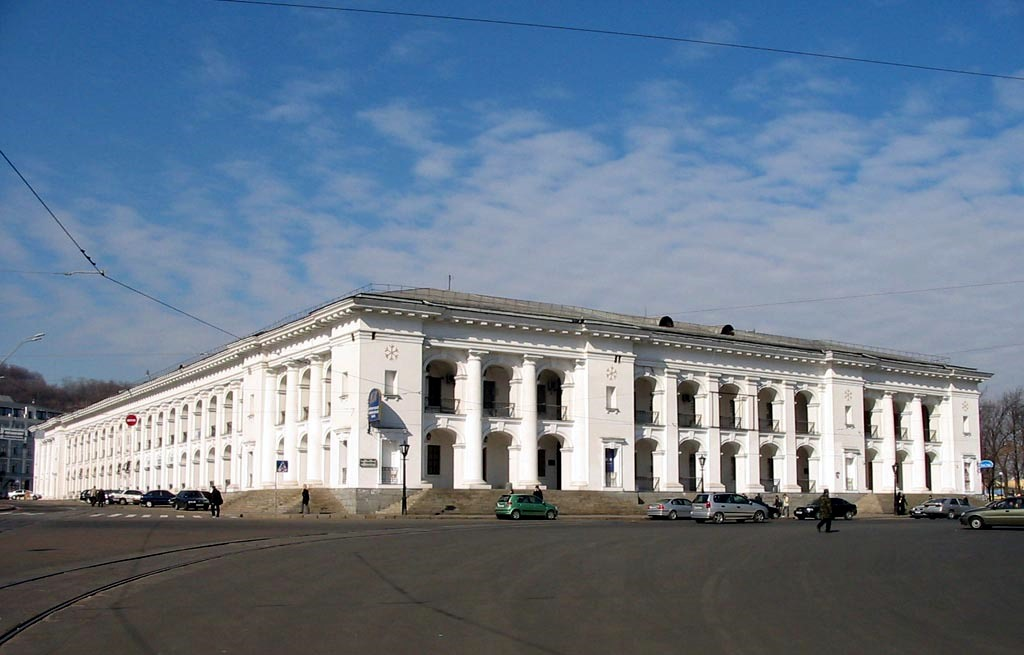
Hostynnyi Dvir in April 2005

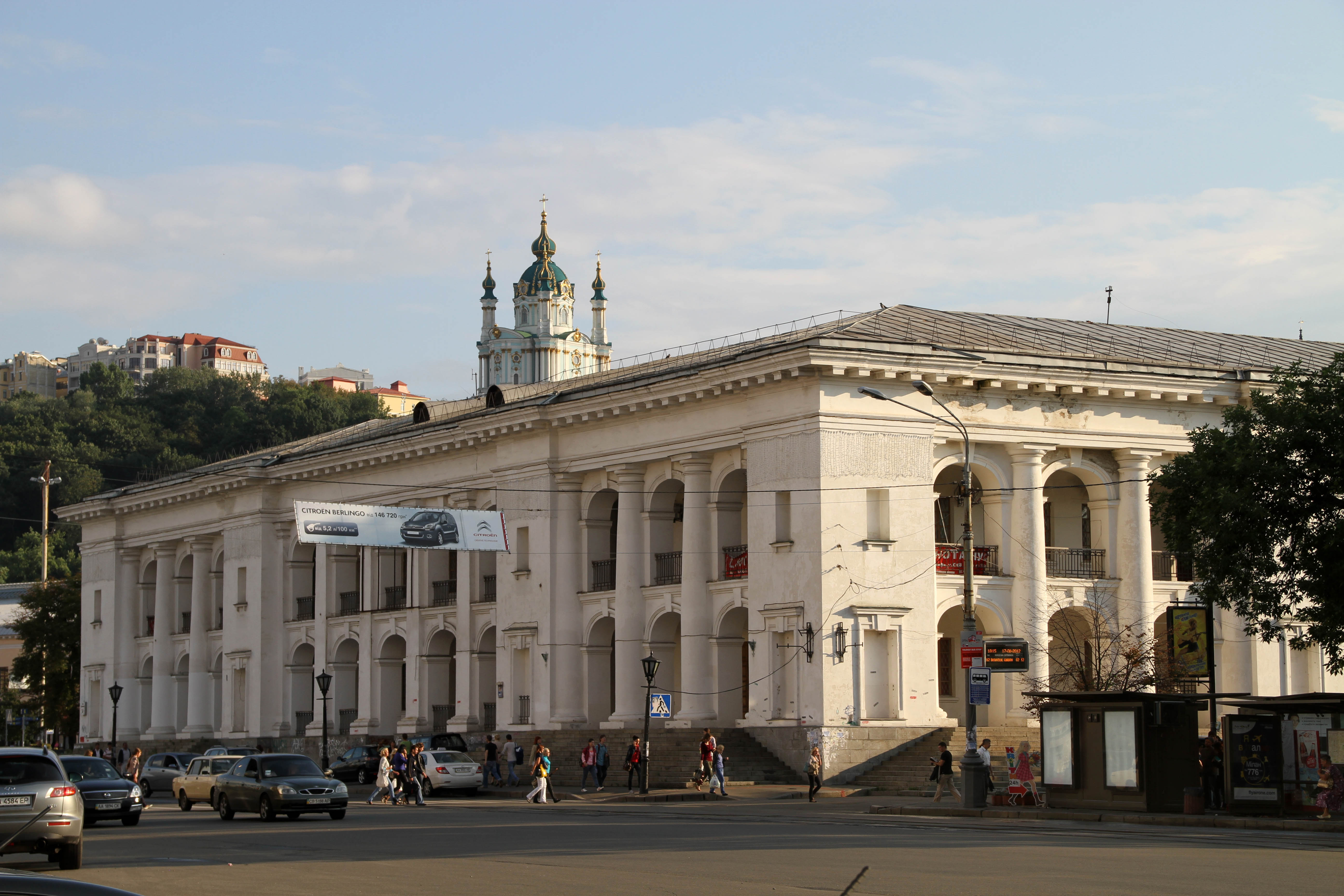
Hostynnyi Dvir in August 2012

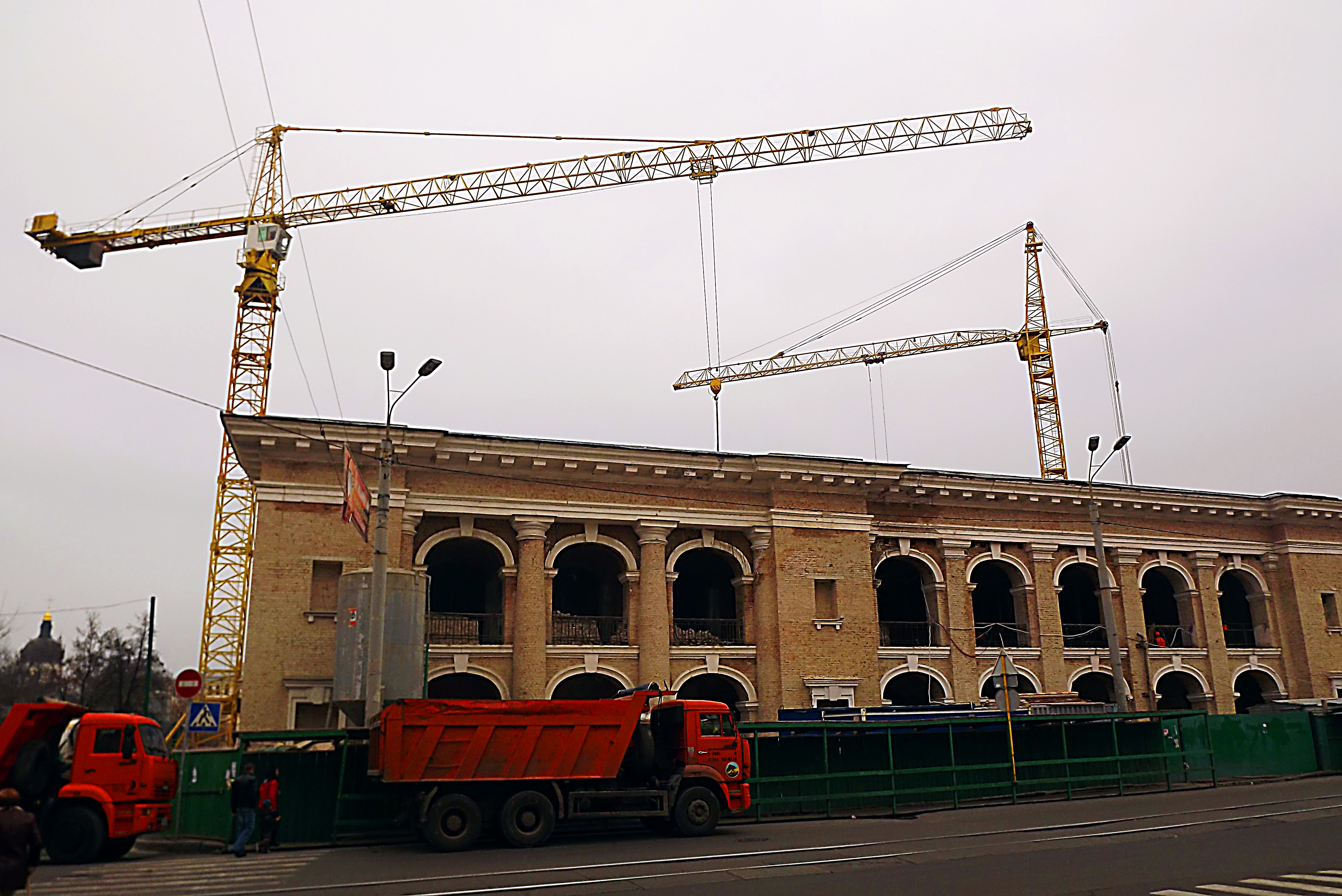
Hostynnyi Dvir in November 2013
