= Fountain of Samson, Kyiv =

Fountain of Samson
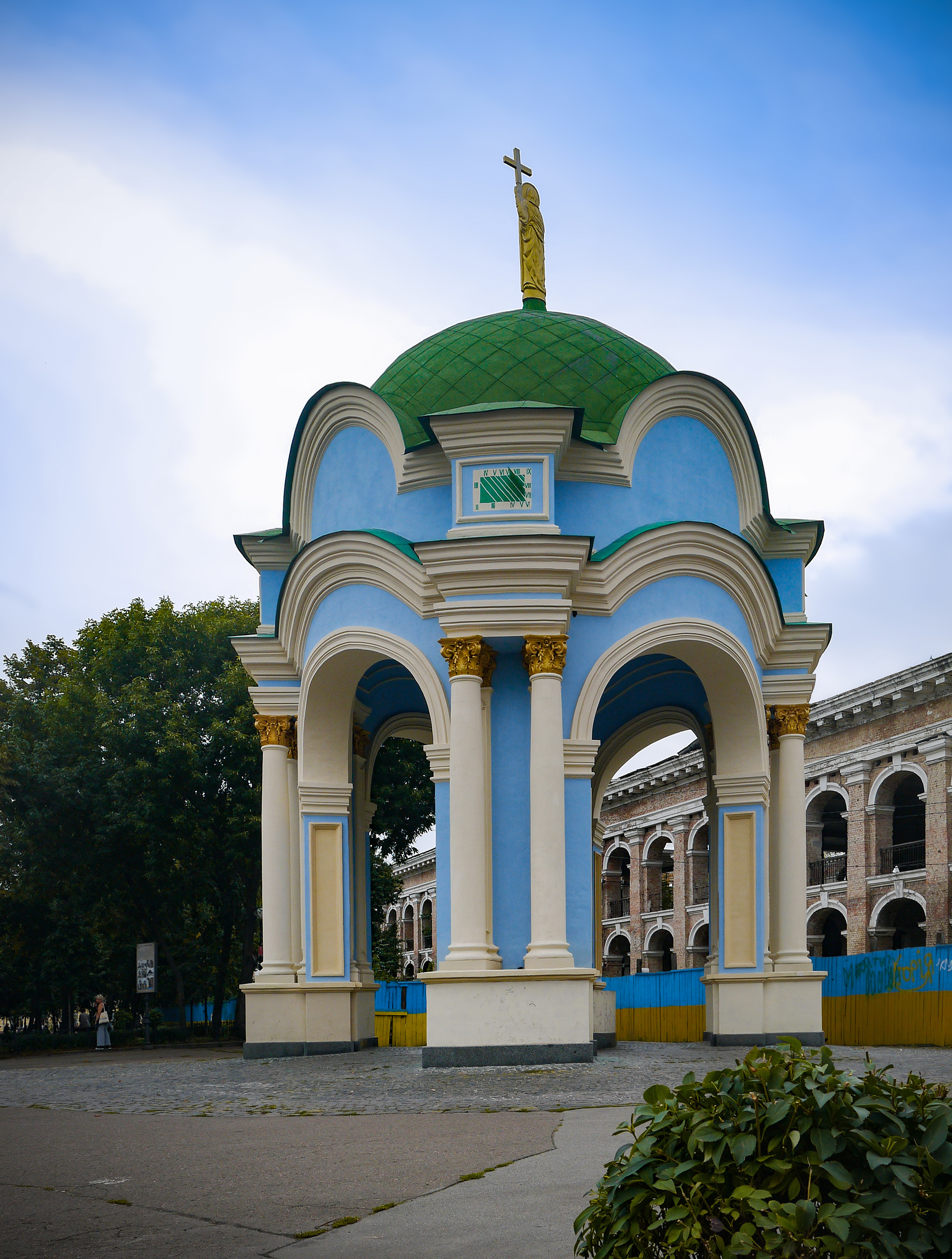
- The reconstructed Fountain of Samson, completed in 1981
- Interactive map of Fountain of Samson
- Location: Kyiv
- Coordinates: 50°27′51″N 30°31′1″E

Immovable Monument of Local Significance of Ukraine
- Official name: Фонтан «Самсон» з ротондою» (Fountain of Samson with the rotunda)
- Type: Architecture, Monumental Art, Archaeology
- Reference no.: 1001-Кв

The Fountain of Samson or Felitsiyal (Ukrainian: Фонтан Самсон, Феліціял, translit.: Fontan Samson, Felitsiial) is a Ukrainian Baroque fountain in the Podil raion of Kyiv. It was constructed in the 18th century, later demolished in 1934 or 1935, and rebuilt in 1981.

== History ==
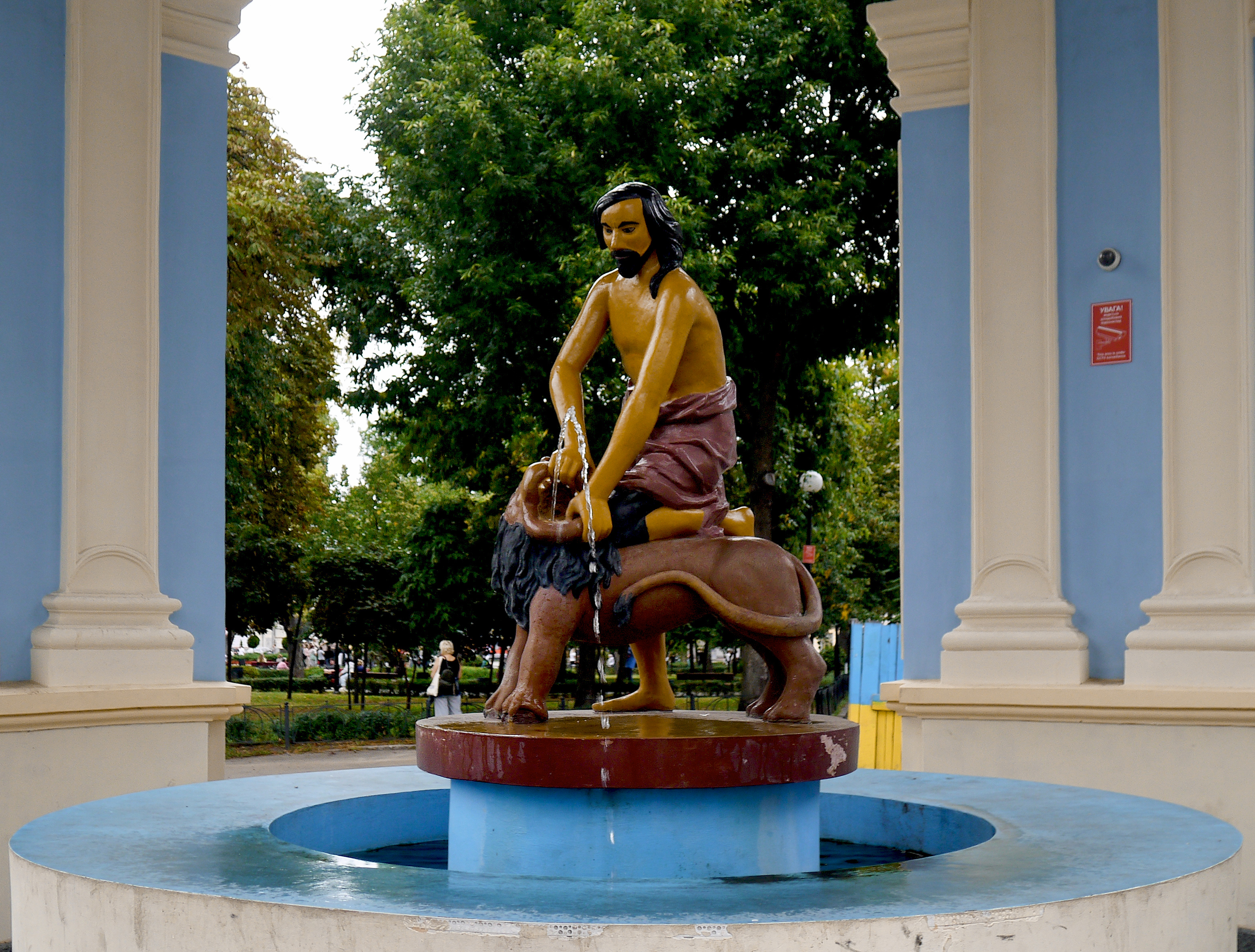
The wooden statue of Samson. The statue survived the destruction of the original fountain and was reinstalled upon completion of the new fountain in 1981

It was constructed during 1748–1749 after the Podil magistrate's decision to repair the water distribution system. The project was assigned to Ivan Hryhorovych-Barskyi, a descendant of a well-known Podil family and a graduate of the Kyiv Mohyla Academy. The fountain was a pavilion-like circular rotunda with a cupola resting on four piers, with each pier embellished by two columns of Corinthian order. The dome of the fountain was topped by a 2-meter-high (6.6 ft) gilded copper statue of St. Andrew. Before the 1800s a statue of an angel who held a chance from which water issued and ran into a basin was erected inside the fountain. In 1809, the angel was replaced by an almost life-size wooden sculpture of Samson, who was tearing the lion's jaws from which the water flowed, hence the name, Fountain of Samson. The sculpture was likely modeled upon Mikhail Kozlovsky's famous statue, a centerpiece of the Peterhof Palace Grand Cascade, with St. Samson symbolising the Russian victory over Sweden at Poltava: the lion is an element of Sweden's coat of arms and the battle was won on St. Samson Day. The fountain received its water supply from the Starokievskaya Gora through wooden pipes.

Before the start of World War I the two statues of St. Andrew and Samson were removed from the fountain and put into storage, which later proved beneficial as the Bolsheviks destroyed the structure altogether. In 1927 the rotunda's dome was repaired by the Kyiv City Council government. During 1935, the Architectural Planning Administration proposed to include the structure in a planned park on the Red Square (now the Kontraktova Square). According to a factually uncertain story, Communist Party official Pavel Postyshev, instructed the Chairman of the City Council, Ryzhkov, to remove the so-called "kiosk". Overnight the 18th century structure was dismantled. Its foundations however were preserved.

During the second half of the 1970s a decision was made to reintroduce the lost historical atmosphere to the old merchant and artisans quarter of Ukrainian capital, as part of an effort to develop Podil as a tourist center of Kyiv. In these plans the rebuilding of the Fountain of Samson was included. In the autumn of 1977, the government of the Ukrainian S.S.R. directed the City Council of Kyiv to rebuild the structure, which was finished in 1981. It was built according to designs by Ukrainian architect V. P. Shevchenko. Today the fountain has sundial clocks on the columns it contains concrete copies of the original statues of St. Andrew and Samson, the originals are on display in the National Art Museum of Ukraine.
