= Ivan Grigorovich-Barsky =

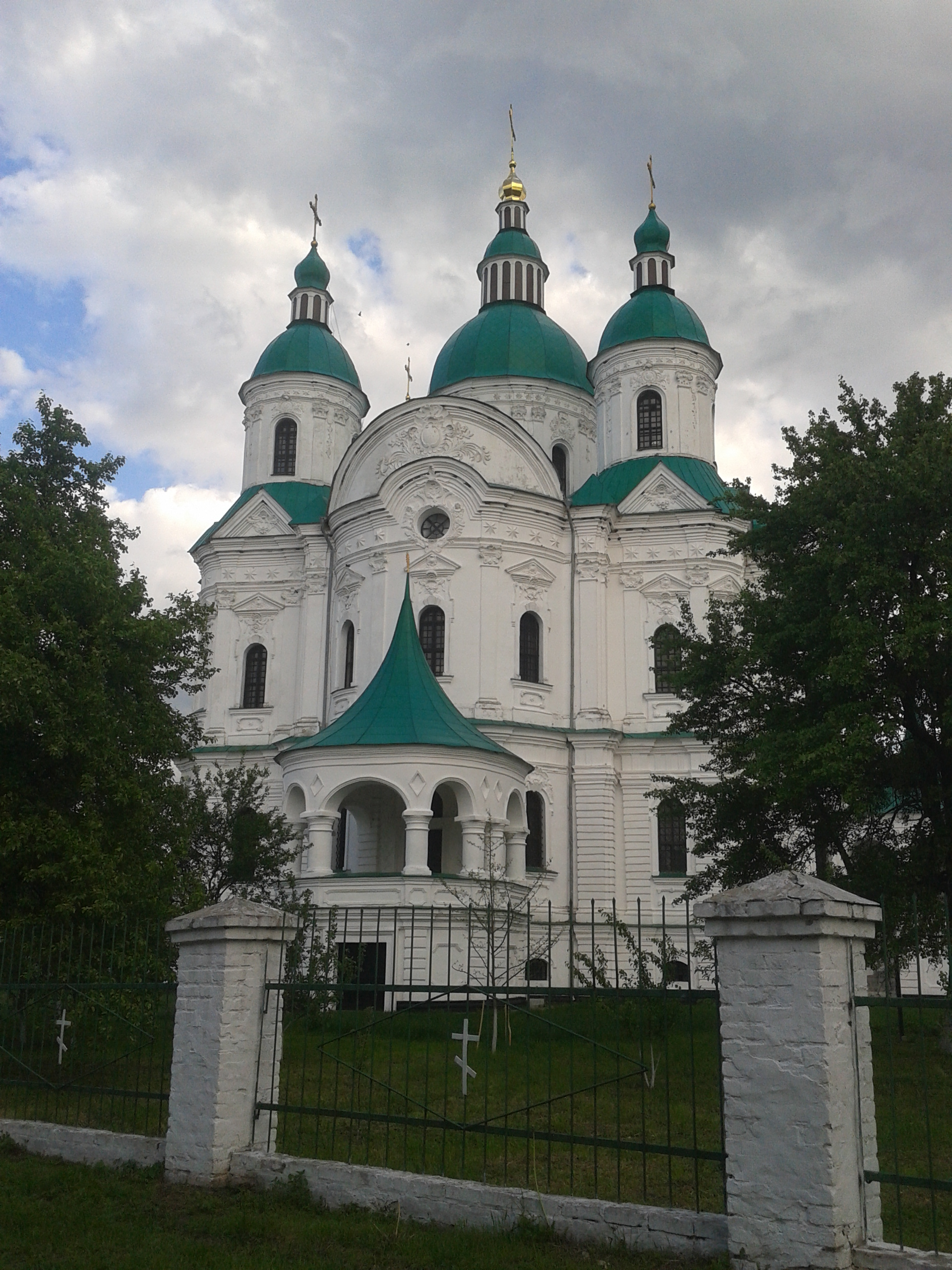
The Church of the Nativity of the Mother of God (1752–1764), in collaboration with Andrey Kvasov in Kozelets.

Ivan Grigorovich-Barsky or Ivan Hryhorovych-Barskyi (Russian: Иван Григорьевич Григорович-Барский; Ukrainian: Іван Григорович Григорович-Барський; 1713–1791) was a Ukrainian-born Imperial Russian architect who worked in the Late Cossack Baroque style. He was a graduate of the Kyiv-Mohyla Academy, and designed many buildings and churches in Kyiv and elsewhere.

He is also known as a brother of Vasil Grigorovich-Barsky.

Buildings designed in Kyiv by him are the church and belfry of Saint Cyril's Monastery and Church (1750–1760), the Church of the Holy Protectress (1766), the Church of Saint Nicholas on the Bank (1772–1775), the belfry of Saints Peter and Paul Monastery (1761–1773), the Old Bursa of the Kyivan Mohyla Academy (1778), the Gostynyi Dvor warehouse (1760s), the Fountain of Samson (1748-1749), and the Magistrat grain warehouse (1760).

Other buildings designed by him are the Church of the Three Saints (1761) in Lemeshi near Chernihiv, the regimental chancellery (1757), the Church of the Nativity of the Mother of God (1752–1764, in collaboration with Andrey Kvasov) in Kozelets, the buildings of the Mezhyhirskyi Monastery in Vyshhorod.

In 1785, 6 years before his death, Ivan Grigorovich-Barsky wrote his own epitaph: "Here is the body of the Kyiv citizen adviser Ivan Grigorovich-Barsky (the brother of the monk Vasily Grigorovich-Barsky, who traveled to different lands and holy places and described in a book everything seen), this same brother of his, who labored in the creation of various structures, brought water to various places, in this city from various sources under the mountains, and then built stone churches, bell towers and chambers. He made the first church in the Kirilovsky monastery, with a belfry, gates, and cellars. Churches of the Intercession and Naberezhno-Nikolskaya. In the city of Kozelets, the churches were decorated with plaster and poked, and the bell tower was again built at the Zolotonoshsky Krasnogorsk monastery, churches, the bell tower at the Peter and Paul Monastery, at the Cathedral Assumption Monastery with a church, also a city store, and a guest house, residential quarters of the Greek monastery and Yuri Dranchev, rebuilt Voskresenskaya and Uspenskaya, cells in the Mezhyhirsk monastery, and this 1785 he died, he was buried here ... May the number of which will be eternal rest".
