= Pyrohoshcha Church =

Church building in Kyiv, Ukraine

Pyrohoshcha Dormition of the Mother of God Church
- Церква Успіння Богородиці Пирогощої
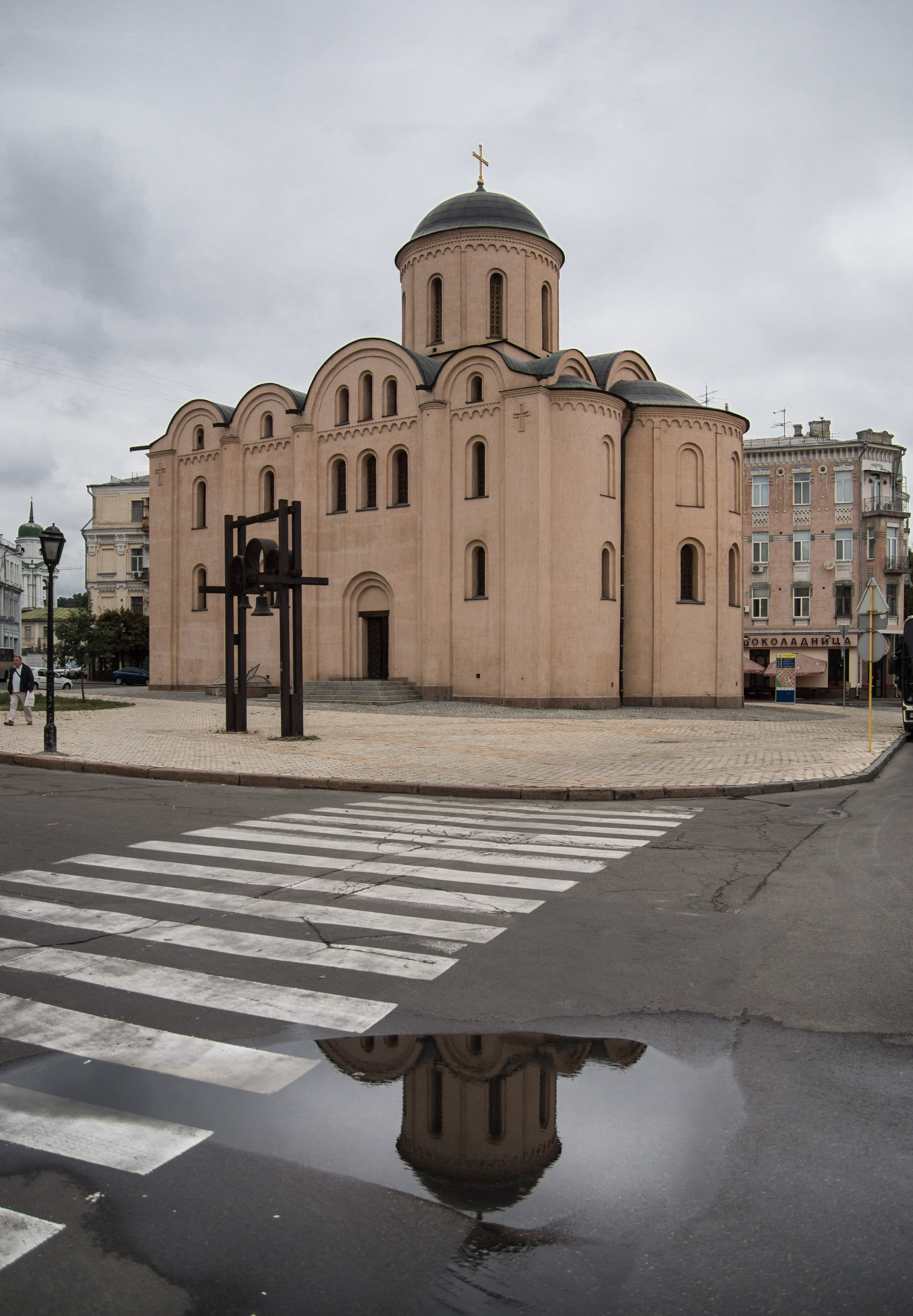
- Church from the southern part of Square of Contracts

Religion
- Affiliation: Ukrainian Orthodox Church of the Kyivan Patriarchate
- Ecclesiastical or organizational status: Parish church
- Year consecrated: ?\1998

Location
- Location: Kyiv, Ukraine
- Interactive map of Pyrohoshcha Dormition of the Mother of God Church
- Coordinates: 50°27′47″N 30°30′59″E

Architecture
- Style: Rus' architecture and other styles in different periods
- Groundbreaking: 1131/1997
- Completed: 1136/1998

Website
- Official Website

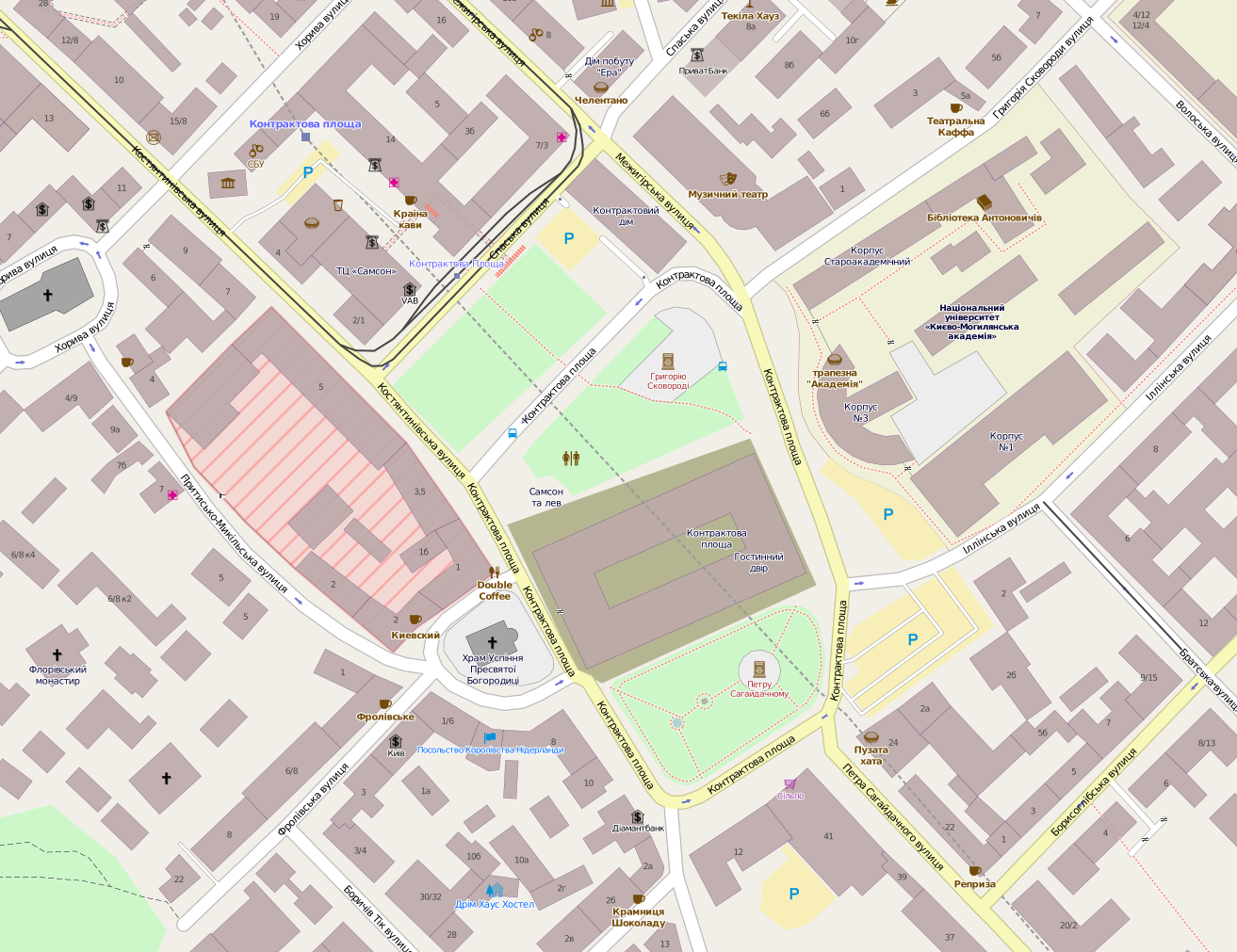
Church location on a map of Square of Contracts

The Pyrohoshcha Dormition of the Mother of God Church (Ukrainian: Церква Успіння Богородиці Пирогощої, romanized: Tserkva Uspinnia Bohorodytsi Pyrohoshchoyi) or simply Pyrohoshcha Church (Ukrainian: Церква Пирогощі [ˈtsɛrkwɐ pɪroˈɦɔʃtʃi]) is an Orthodox church in Kyiv in the historical neighbourhood Podil. The original church was built in 1130s by the Mstyslav I the Great of Kyiv. It was the main church of Podil, and was a temporary cathedral of Kyiv Metropolitanate in the early 17 century. In 1613 the church was reconstructured in Renaissance style, and then in 18th–19th centuries was rebuilt in Ukrainian Baroque and Neoclassicism styles.

In 1934, the church became the cathedral of Ukrainian Autocephalous Church when its center moved from Kharkiv to Kyiv together with the capital of Ukrainian SSR. But it was in that status less than a year, being destroyed in 1935 by the Soviet administration for the reason of "reconstructing the square". Then, for some time the church was largely forgotten by the time the research on its remains began in 1976. At that time the idea of rebuilding of the church appeared, but the project was completed only in 1997, providing the restoration in the hypothetic Medieval Rus' style, which was made in 1997–1998. However, the historical originality of the reconstruction is still in discussion.

On the Easter of 1998, the rebuilt Pyrohoshcha was consecrated as a church of the Ukrainian Orthodox Church of the Kyivan Patriarchate. On 11 November 2012 Patriarch Filaret consecrated the church religious paintings.
