= Kyiv Mountains =

Highland near the city of Kyiv, Ukraine

Coordinates: 50.446793°N 30.522282°E

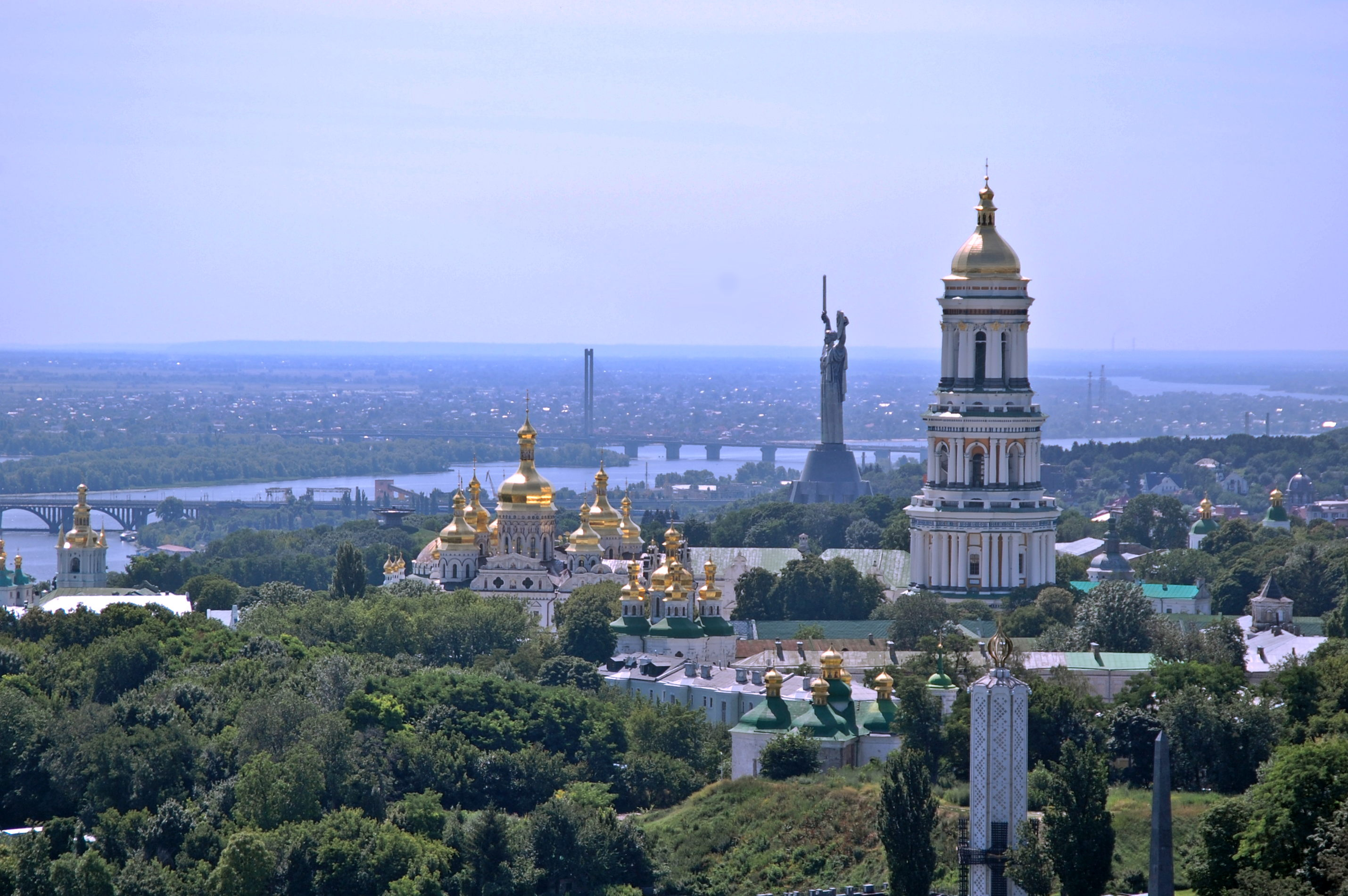
- Pechersk Hills with Kyiv Pechersk Lavra

Geography

Immovable Monument of National Significance of Ukraine
- Official name: Історичний ландшафт Київських гір і долини р. Дніпра (Historic Landscape of Kyiv Mountains and the Dnieper River Valley)
- Type: Landscape, History
- Reference no.: 560-Кв

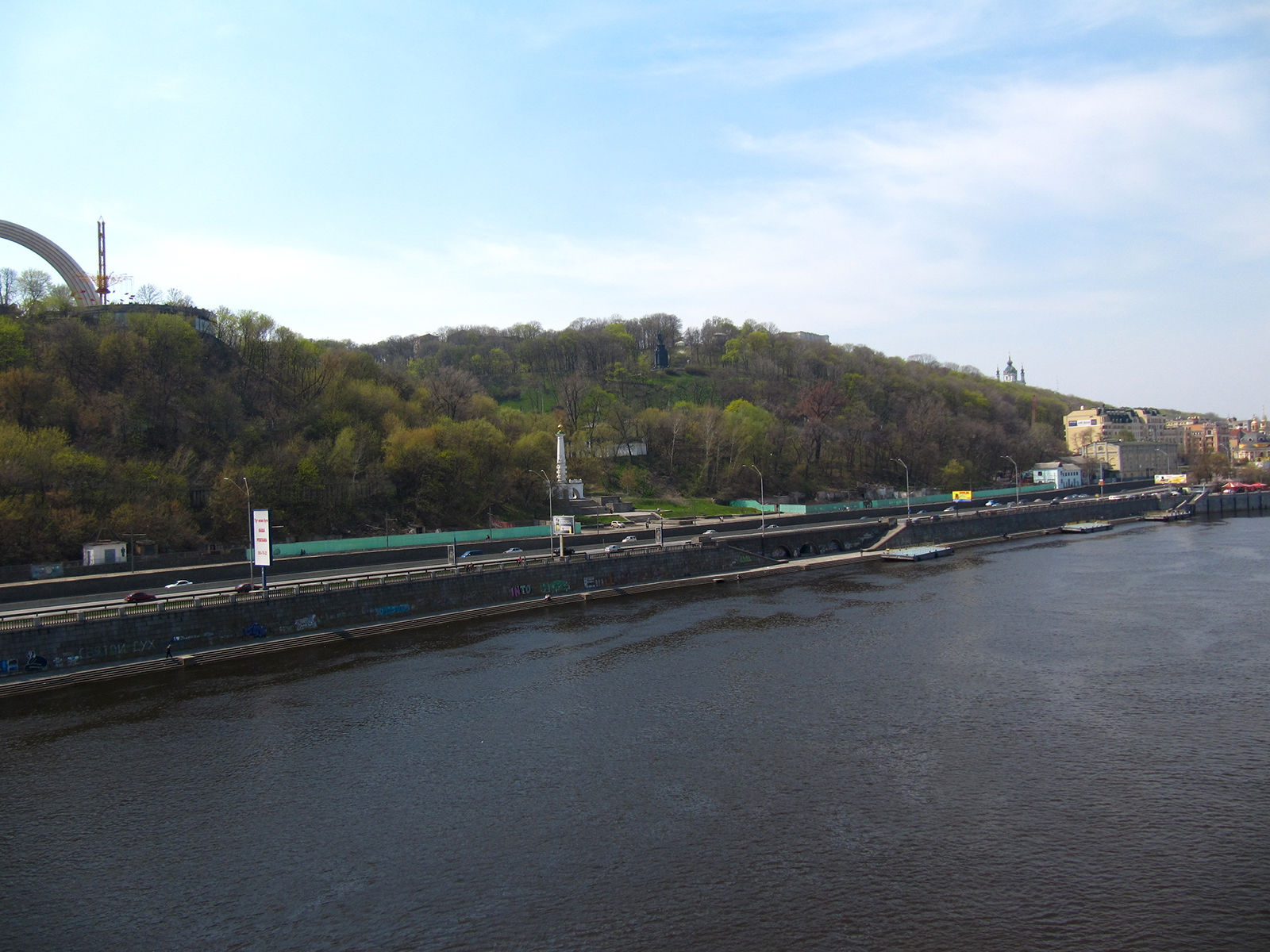
Volodymyr Hill over Dnieper

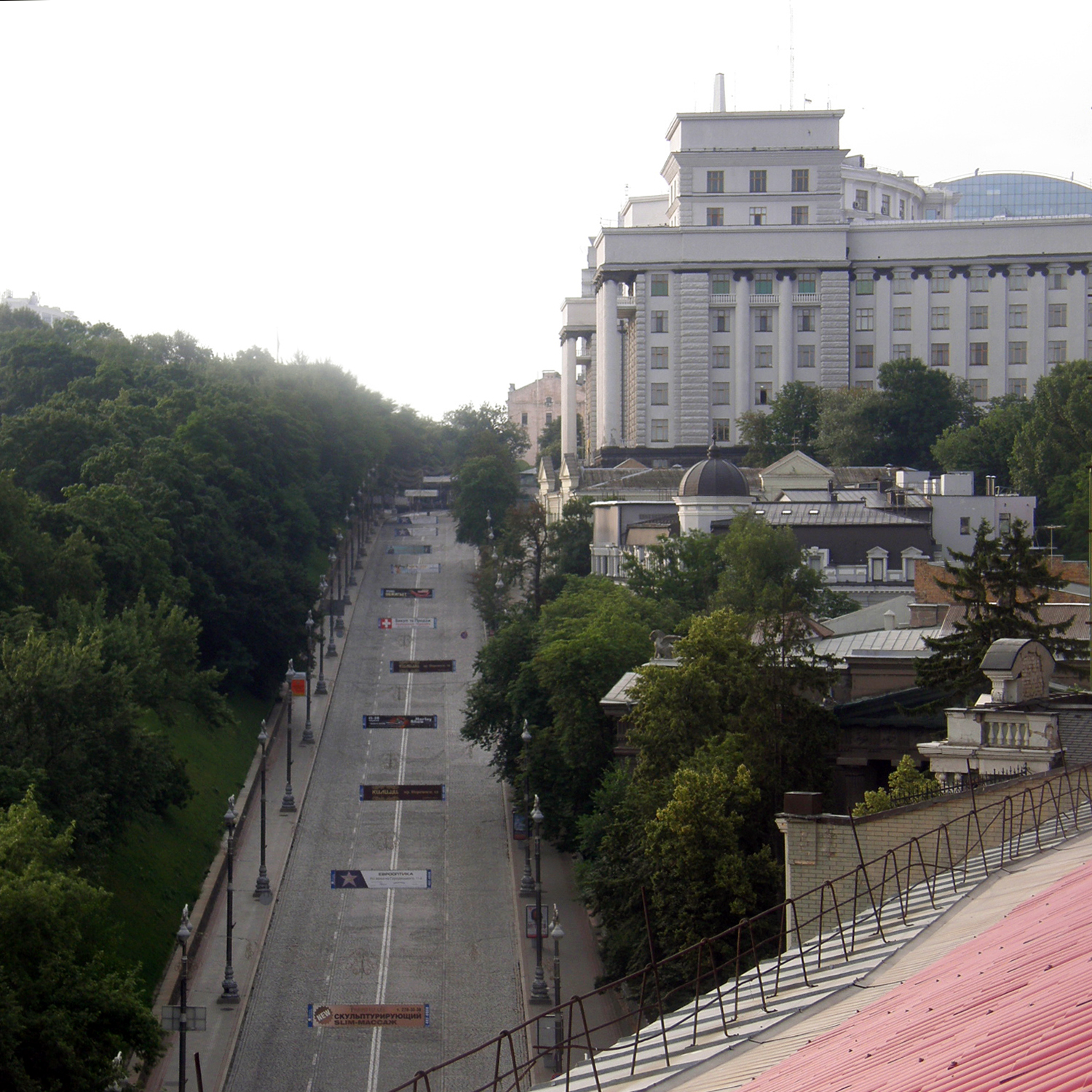
Rise of Hrushevskoho Street (Pecherskyi District)

Kyiv Mountains or Kyiv Hills (Ukrainian: Київські гори, Київські пагорби, romanized: Kyivski hory, Kyivski pahorby) is a term used in journalism and literature for hills and highlands around the city of Kyiv that range from approximately 150 to almost 200 meters. The city of Kyiv is located within borders of three orographic regions: Dnieper Upland (Cisdnieper Upland) and Polesian and Dnieper lowlands. The hills are located in northern part of the Kyiv plateau where the Dnieper Upland slopes down towards the Dnieper river valley and the Kyiv Polesia. The highest marks recorded in central and southwestern parts of the city (within the Dnieper Upland, particularly the Kyiv plateau).

Hilly landscape is the reason for the unusual depths and two-fold escalators of underground Kyiv Metro (subway) stations in the city center (with the deepest one, Arsenalna, measuring 105.5 metres).

== Kyiv plateau ==
The Kyiv plateau as a geologic creation presents itself as a rolling meadow plain dissected with ravines and gulches. According to the physiographic categorization the given territory is part of the Obukhiv-Vasylkiv section of forest steppe. The plateau stretches along the right bank of Dnieper from Kyiv to Kaniv where a complex of other hills compose a landscape feature known as Kaniv Mountains.

At the heart of the upland lay Jurassic, Cretaceous, Paleogene, Neogene and Quaternary deposits that are covered with a thick layer of loess on which formed gray and lightly gray limed silt of light loam. Creation of the loess hills of Dnieper region is connected with withdrawal of the last Great Sea basin, the Kharkiv Sea.

== General description ==
=== Pechersk and vicinity ===
The highest elevation of the Kyiv Mountains is an upland that corresponds to historic city neighborhood Pechersk (Caves). Sometimes it is referred to as Pechersk Hills or Pechersk Elevation. The highest elevated location of the upland is situated at Lypky and known as Levashov Hill (after the General Governor Vasiliy Levashov). Its maximum height is 196.8 m (646 ft). The same height is also recorded at a small area near the Kyiv Metro station Arsenalna. Somewhat lower marks are in front of the Verkhovna Rada building (Constitution Square) – 195 m (640 ft). Considering that the absolute water level in Dnieper is recorded at 91.5 m (300 ft), the upland rises over the river some 100 meters.

To the south and down of the Dnieper stream flow is located the Bous Hill or Bousovytsia. Today there is the Hryshko National Botanic Garden. The highest point of the hill (188.8 m (619 ft)) is southeast of the botanic garden entrance. Beside the Bous Field, at the north of the hill lays Zvirynets neighborhood that is more famous therefore the whole area sometimes is called "Zvirynets".

To the Pechersk Hills is adjacent the Cherepanov Hill, the height of which is 184.9 m (607 ft). On the hill were erected Hospital fortifications of the Kyiv Fortress and the Military Hospital, while at the northwestern foot of the hill is located the Olimpiyskiy National Sports Complex.

=== Old Kyiv and vicinity ===
Practically of the same height – 187.7 m (616 ft) – is the Old Kyiv Hill (Starokyivska) and its northeastern portion, the St. Michael's Hill (Mykhailivska). Before they were separated by a ravine that stretched across the St. Michael's Square and Kyiv Funicular. On the eastern rise of the St. Michael's Hill is located a park, Volodymyr Hill, the name of which derived from the monument to St. Volodymyr located in it.

A little bit lower is the northern side of the Old Kyiv Hill, Dytynets, 185.1 m (607 ft). There in place of the Kyi Fort is located the National Museum of History of Ukraine.

Beyond the Andrew's Descent is the Old Kyiv's spur, St. Andrew's Hill (Andriyivska) which is 167.7 m (550 ft) in height. Before, the St. Andrew's Hill was connected with the Castle Hill, but the Andrew's Descent divided them. The hill's name was left after it when in 1749–54 here was erected the St Andrew's Church. Somewhat down the descent from the "Richard's Castle", one may notice another hill, Uzdykhalnytsia. Some consider it a separate hill, others - a part of the St. Andrew's Hill.

To the west of Dytynets, there is a smaller hill, Dytynka, that is located between old neighborhoods of Dehtyari (Tarboilers), Honchari (Potters), and Kozhumyaki (Tanners).

High is also an area adjacent to the Old Kyiv Hill from the south where is located Sofia Square. Its height reaches there 193.5 m (635 ft).

To the northwest of Old Kyiv is located the Castle Hill (Zamkova Hora), the highest point of which reaches 169.1 m (555 ft). The hill is little bit elongated with depression.

Relatively close to the Castle Hill is located the Oleh Hill or Shchekavytsia, the height of which is 172.2 m (565 ft). About 1.5 km (0.93 mi) to the northwest from Shchekavytsia is located Khorevytsia with height of 173.5 m (569 ft).

Panoramic view of the Old Kyiv Upland from the Castle Hill (Zamkova Hora, 2012). On the far left is Podil, the Lower City; to its right is the St. Andrew's Hill, further - Dytynka and in the background - Dytynets and Old Kyiv, also known as the Upper City; on the far right is the Castle Hill.

== List of the top highest ==
=== Over 180 meters ===
- Pechersk plateau
- Busova Hora
- Batyieva Hora
- Kyrylivska Hora
- Mykhailivska Hora
- Vovcha Hora
- Starokyivska Hora
- Cherepanova Hora

=== Over 150 meters ===
- Shchekavytsia
- Khorevytsia
- Zamkova Hora
- Uzdykhalnytsia
- Kudriavets
- Baikova Hora
- Bahrynova Hora
- Lysa Hora
- Vitriani Hory

=== Under 150 meters ===
- Chorna Hora
