= Lesya Ukrainka Boulevard =

Boulevard in Pecherskyi District, Kyiv, Ukraine

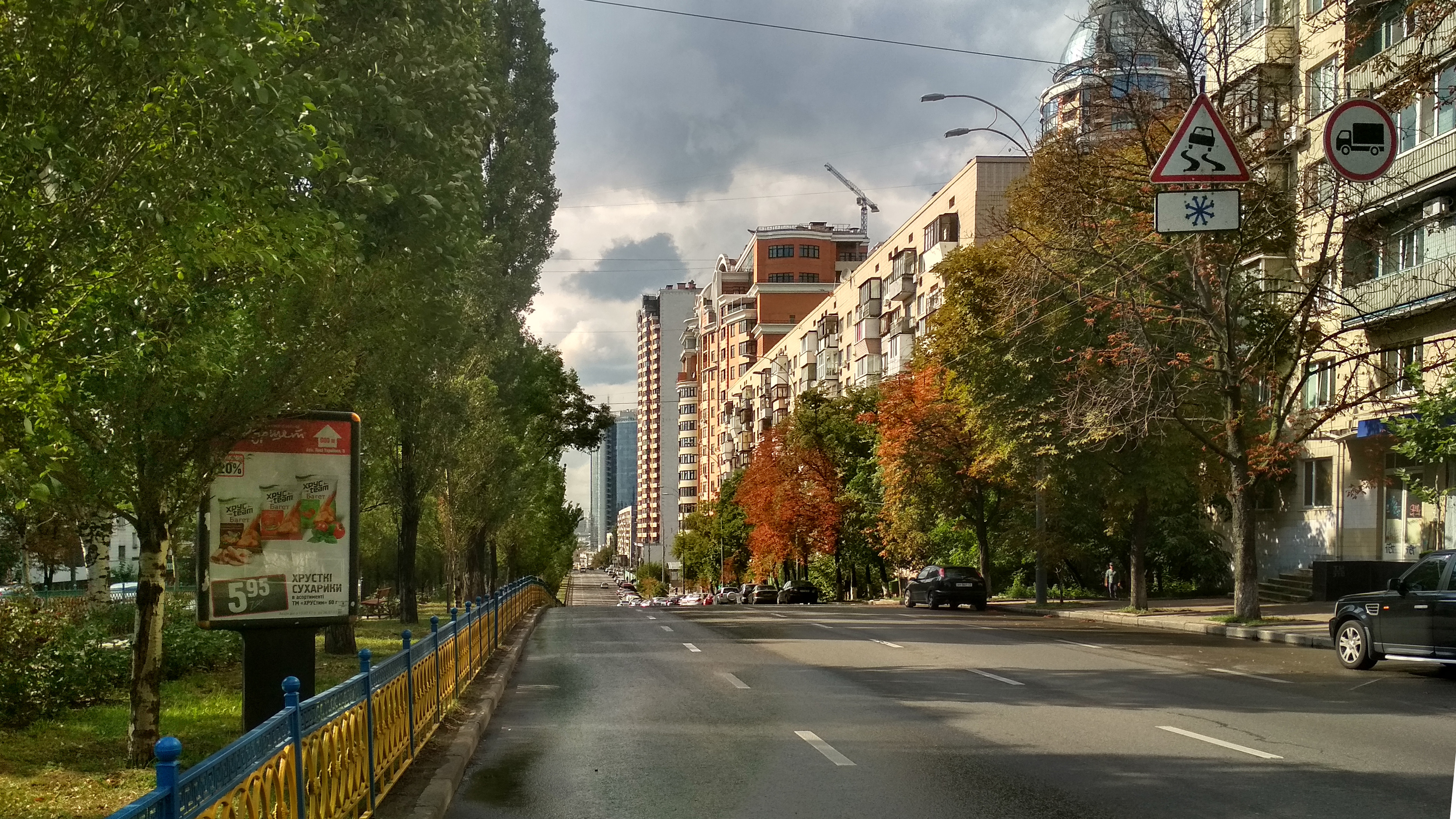
- Lesya Ukrainka Boulevard in summer
- Native name: Бульвар Лесі Українки (Ukrainian)
- Namesake: Lesya Ukrainka
- Length: 2,600 m (8,500 ft)
- Location: Pechersk, Cherepanova Hora, Pecherskyi District; Kyiv, Ukraine
- Postal code: 01001, 01021, 01133
- Coordinates: 50°26′18.9″N 30°31′31.2″E

Lesya Ukrainka Boulevard (Ukrainian: Бульва́р Ле́сі Украї́нки, romanized: Buljvar Lesi Ukrajinky) is a boulevard in Pecherskyi District of the city of Kyiv, in the area of Pechersk and Cherepanova Hora. It runs from the Bessarabska Square and Shota Rustaveli Street via Baseina Street (of which the boulevard is a continuation), Shovkovychna Street, Hospitalna Street and Mechnikova Street to Mykola Mikhnovsky Boulevard (part of the Small Ring Road of Kyiv). The boulevard is named in honour of famous poet Lesya Ukrainka (1871–1913, whose pseudonymous surname literally means "Ukrainian woman").

It intersects with Novospitalna Street, Mala Shiyanovska Street, General Almazov Street, Mykhailo Zadniprovsky Street, Lesya Ukrainka Square, John McCain Street, Petra Bolbochana Street, Kurhanivska Street, Verkhnia Street, and Maria Pryimachenko Boulevard. Lesya Ukrainka Boulevard is connected by the Pechersky Bridge to Bastionna Street and Mykhailo Boichuk Street.

== History ==
The boulevard appeared in the late 1950s in connection with the start of construction on previously undeveloped areas between Hospitalna and Novohospitalna Streets. The final section was laid on the site of the old Zasarayna Street (вулиць Засара́йної; between Novospitalna Street and the modern Lesia Ukrainka Square), Shchorsa (Щорса; from the current Lesya Ukrainka Square to John McCain Street) and Pecherska (Пече́рської; in 1958), Pecherskyi Boulevard (Печерський бульвар). The current name Lesya Ukrainka Boulevard was given to it in 1961.

In August 2011, major repairs were carried out on the boulevard's roadway as part of the city's preparations for Euro 2012.

== Buildings of historical or architectural value ==
- № 25. Formerly a cadet school, now Ivan Bohun Military High School; 1915–1916.
- № 18А. Caponier of the 3rd polygon; 1844.
- № 25. The headmaster's house; 1914–1916.
- № 25. Stables of the indoor riding arena of the Oleksiyivsky Cadet Corps; 1914–1916.
- № 25-А. Indoor riding arena of the Oleksiyivsky Cadet Corps; 1914–1916.
- № 27/2. Officers' residential buildingв; 1914–1916.
- № 25. 1974 Alexander Suvorov memorial, Imperial Russian general . Dismantled in 2019 as part of the demolition of monuments to Suvorov in Ukraine.
- № 36-Б. On 28 October 2015, Australian artist Guido van Helten completed a 12-day project to paint a giant mural of a girl in an embroidered shirt on the façade of an 18-storey residential building. The mural is 43 metres high. This is the artist's largest work not only in Ukraine, but also in Europe.

== Institutions and establishments ==
- Pecherska Central District Library (буд. № 7).
- Secondary general education school № 84 (буд. № 32-А)

== Gallery ==
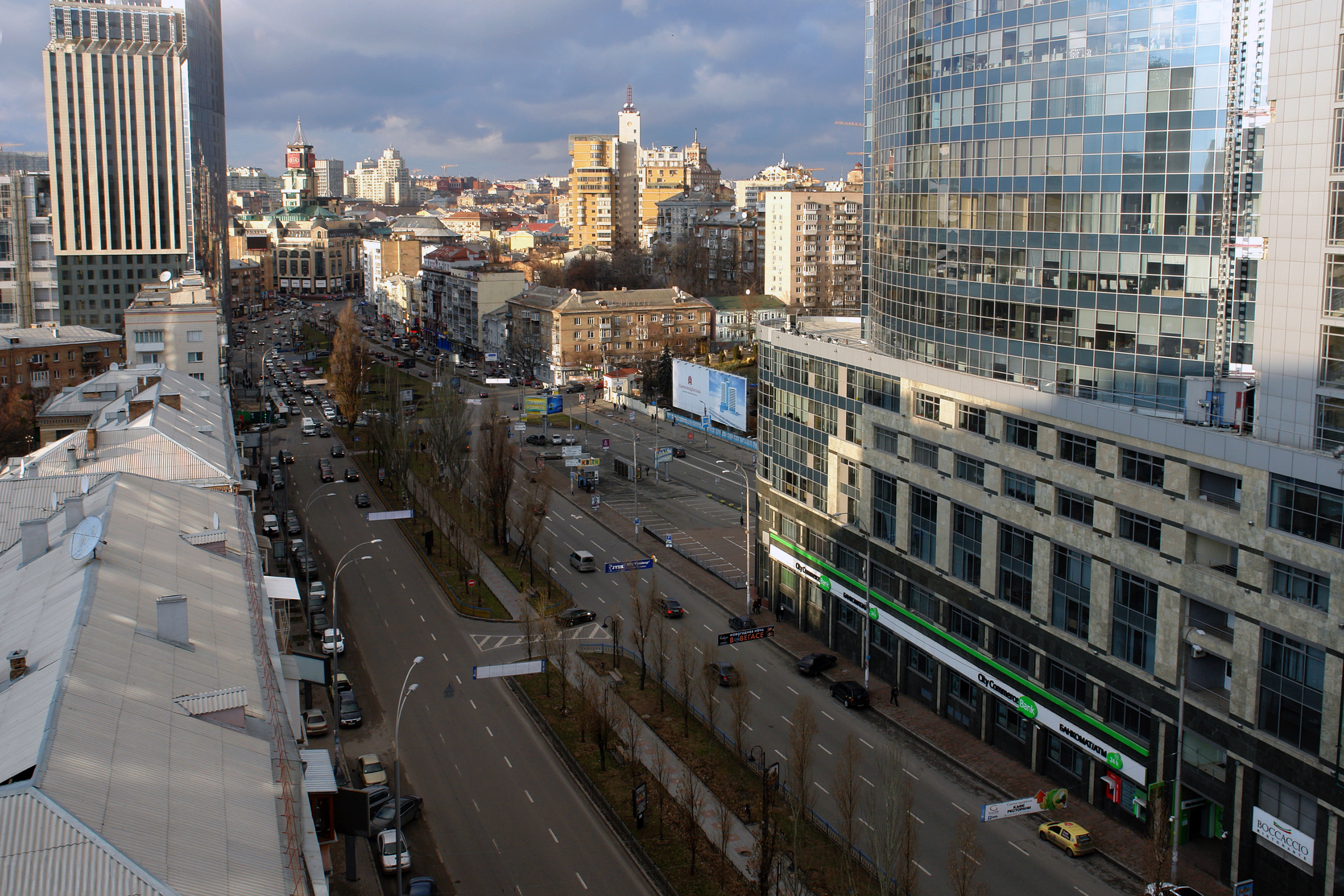
The beginning of the boulevard from Baseina Street with the roof of Besarabsky Market visible in the background

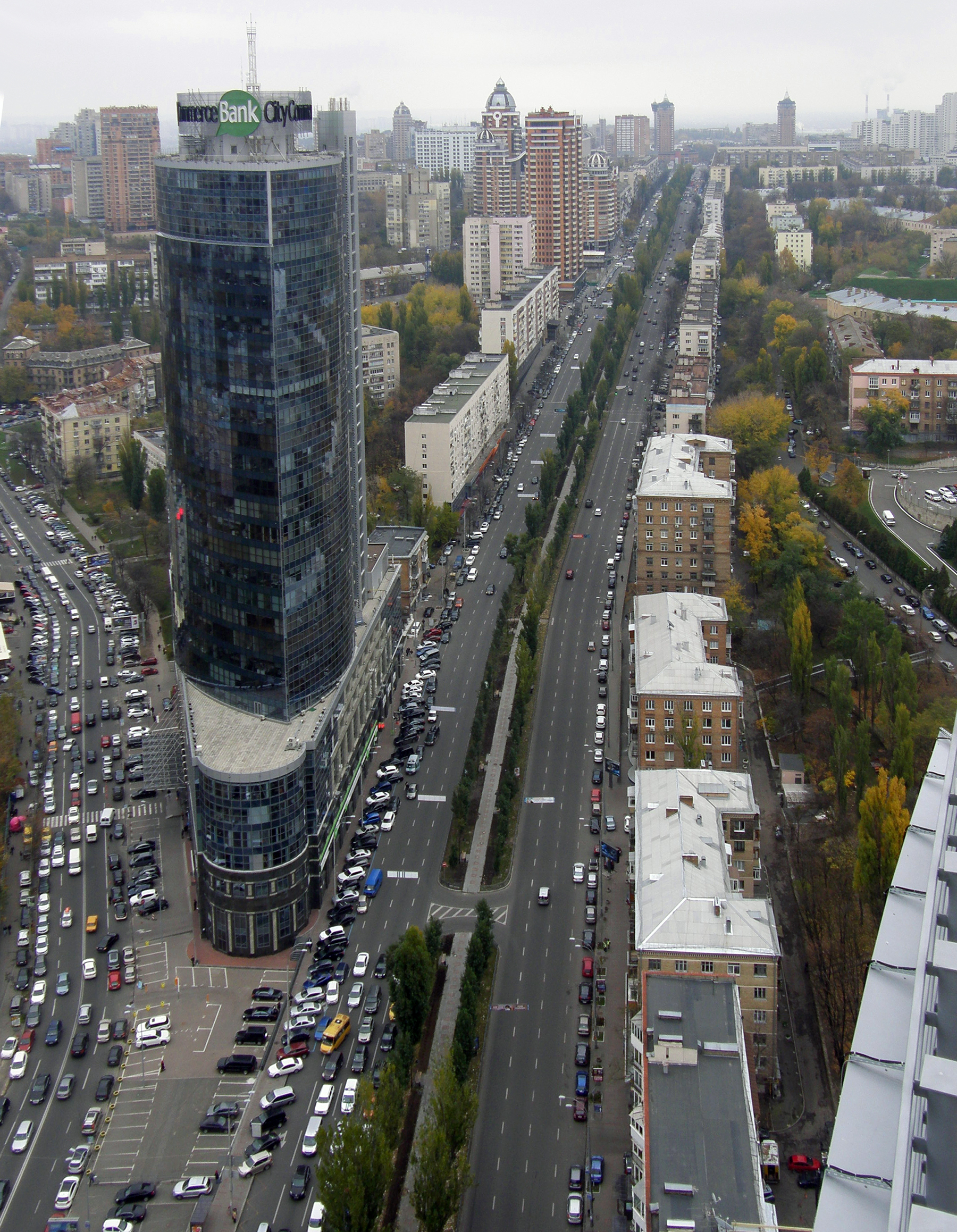
Boulevard from the beginning

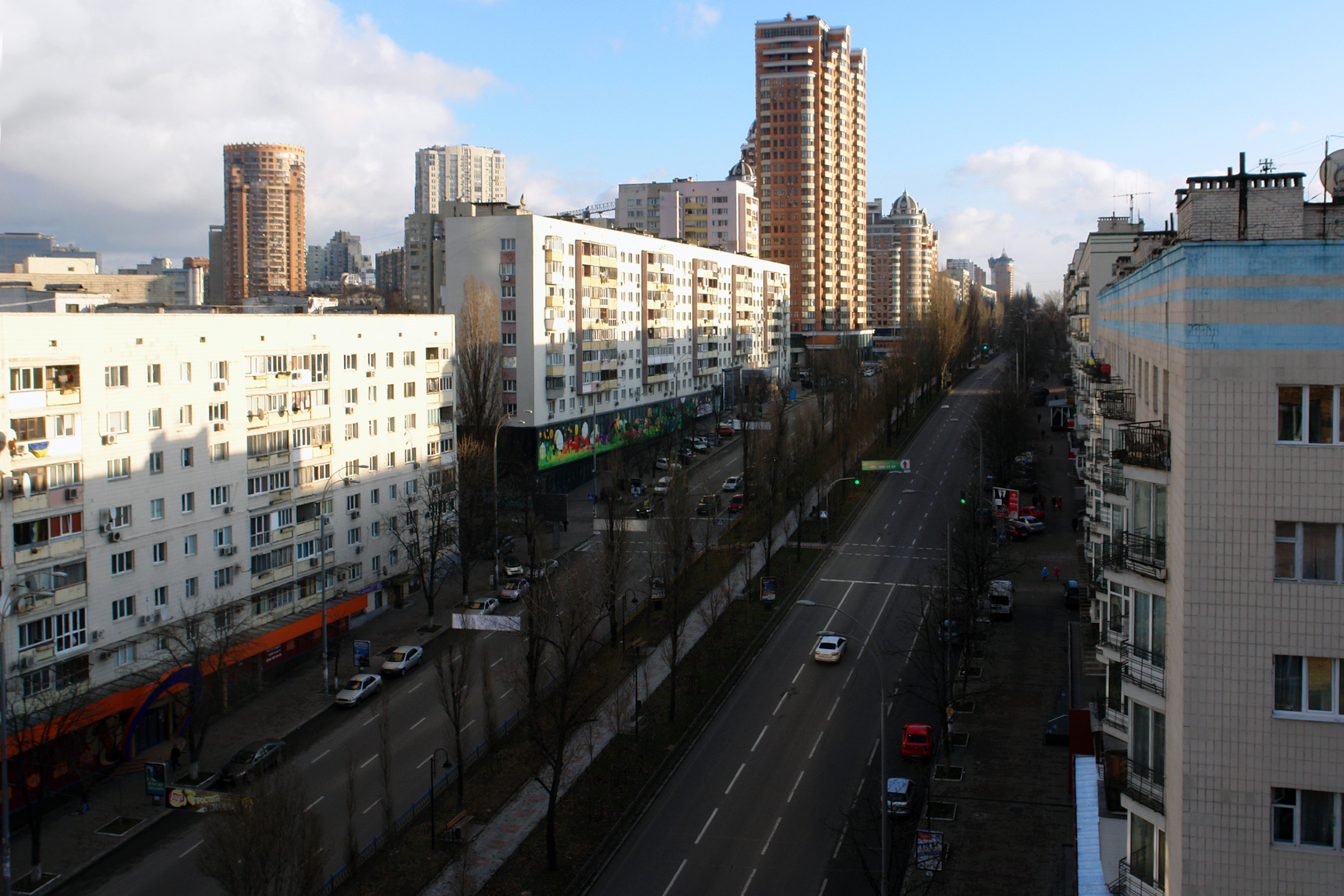
from No. 3 (left) and No. 10 (right)

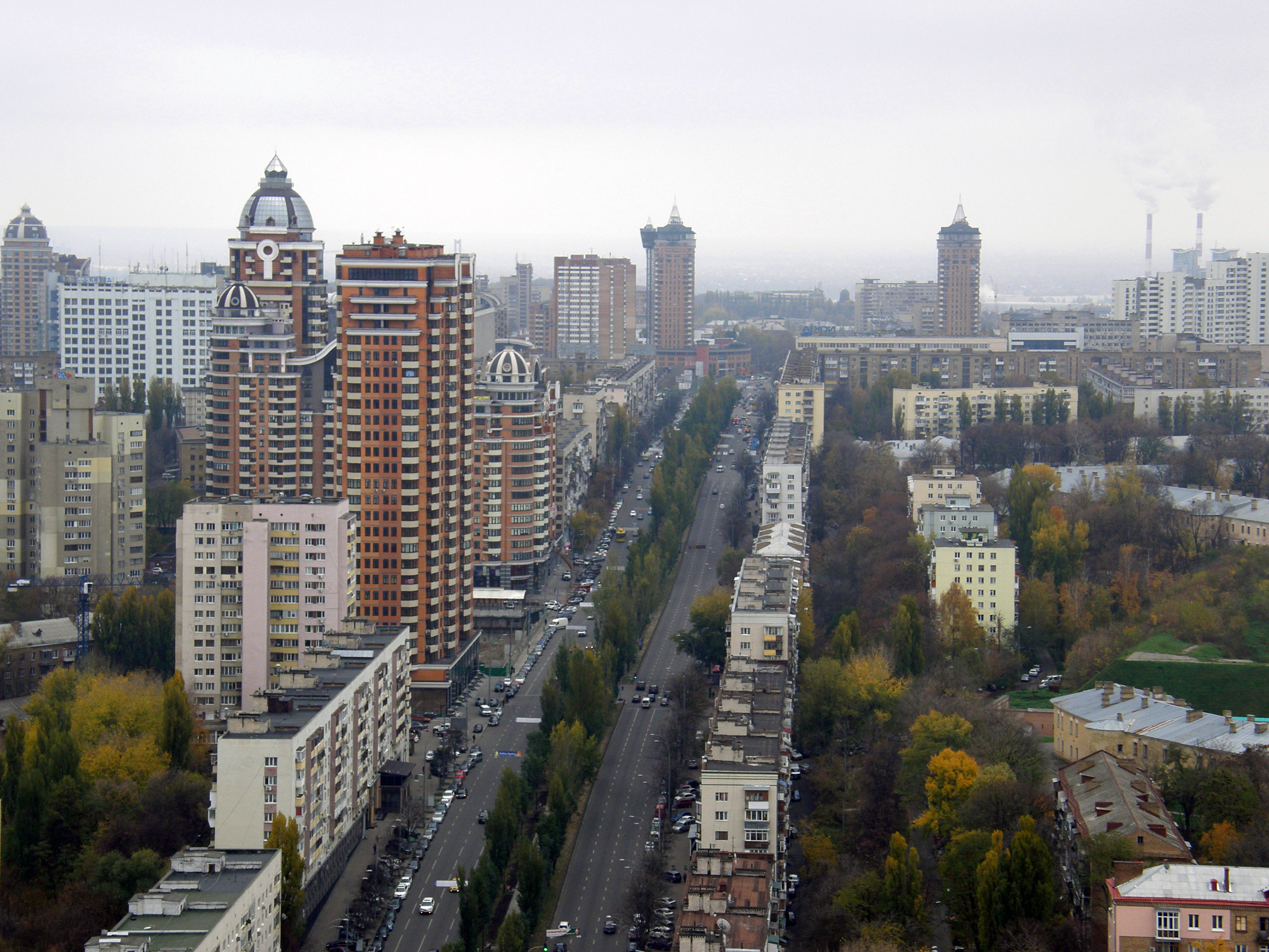
View in the direction of Pechersk

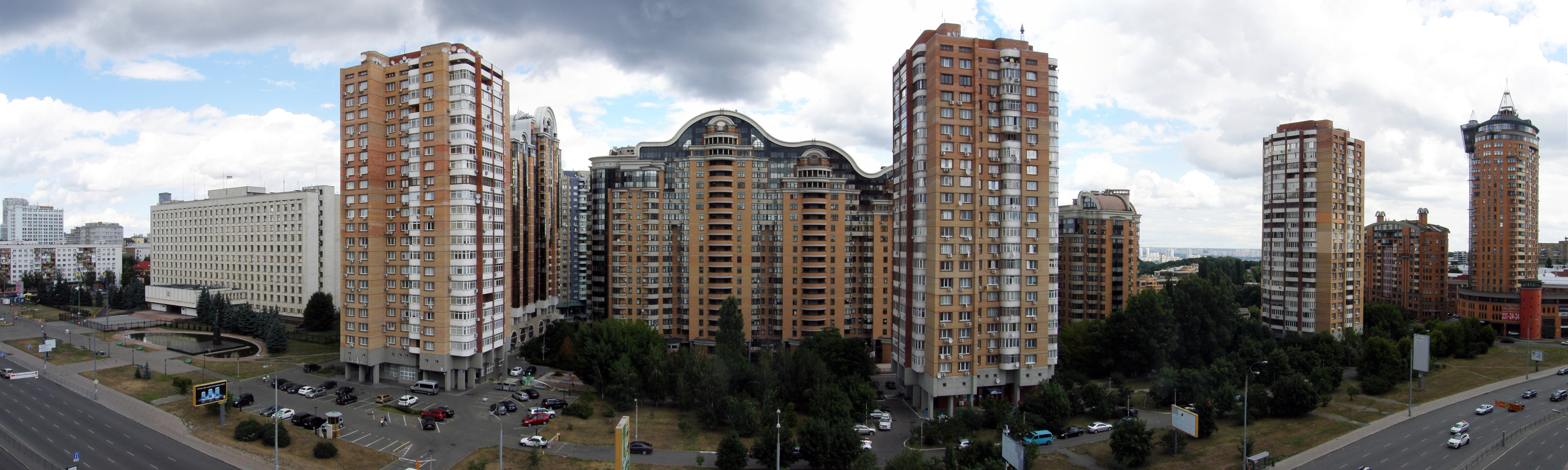
Tsar Village

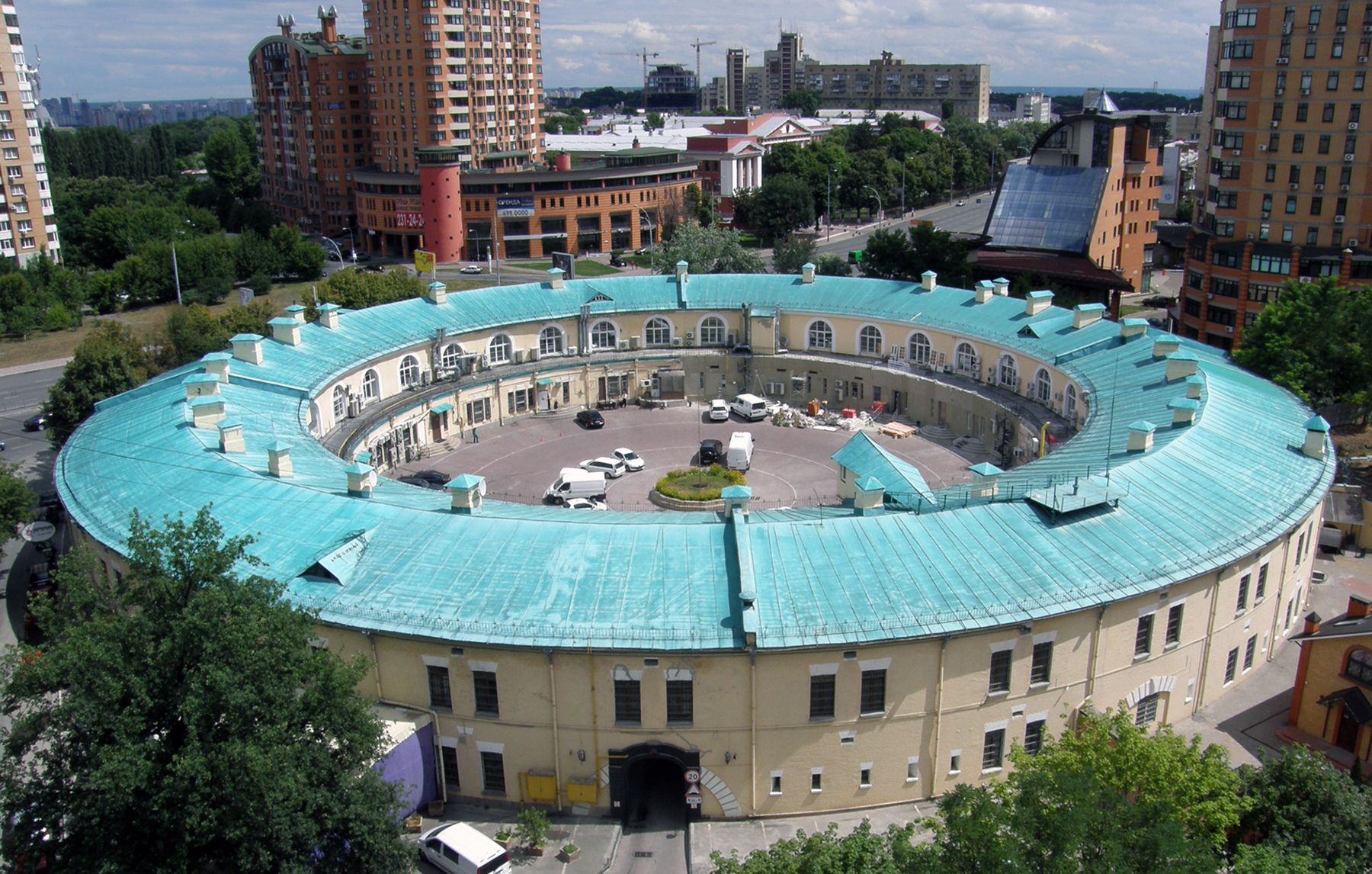
Round tower (No. 2) of the Vasylkiv fortifications (located at 44 Konovaltsia Street)

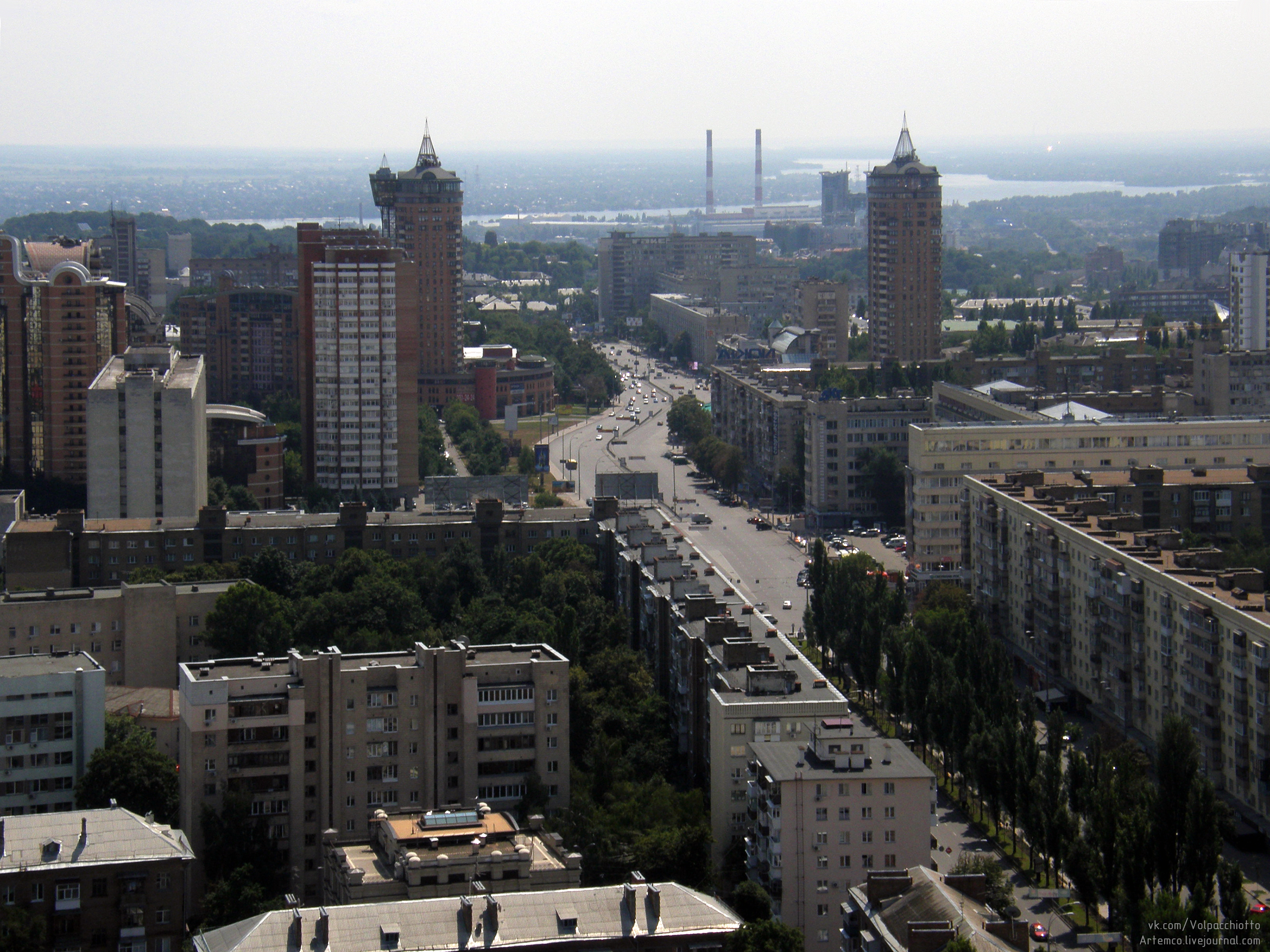
View in the direction of Zvirynets

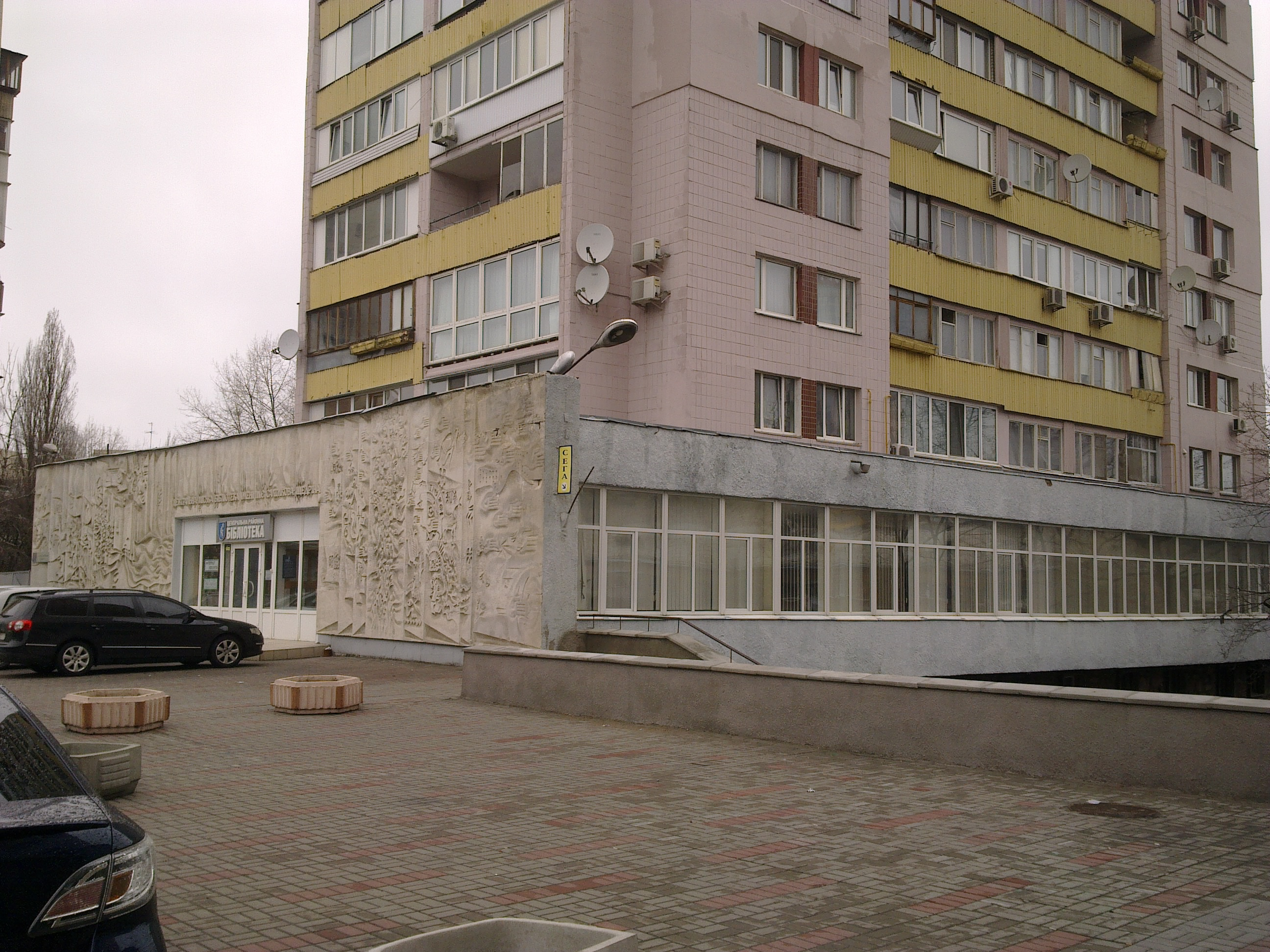
No. 7 Pechersk Central Public District Library

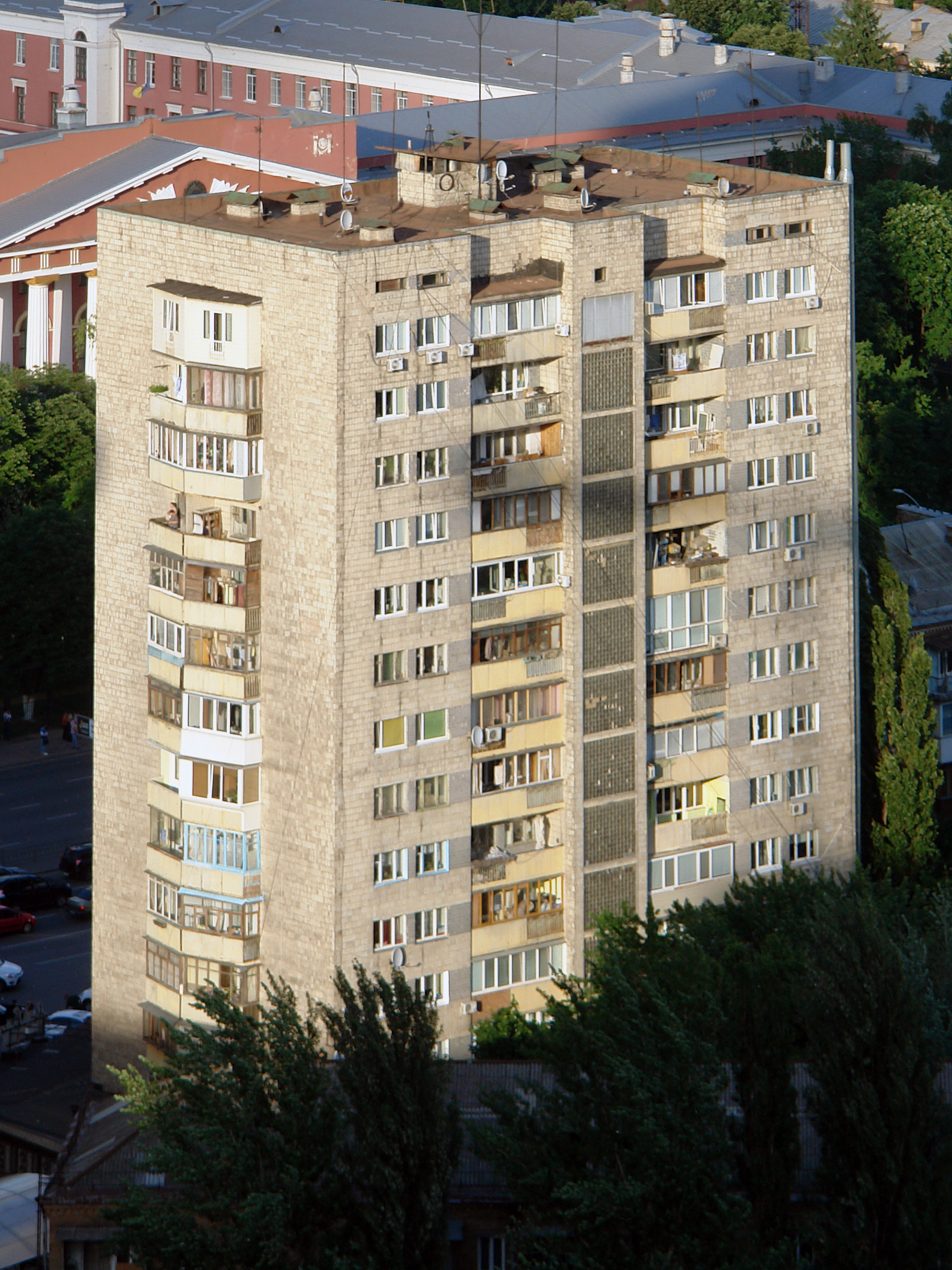
No. 30а – the first house in the K-14 series, 1965.

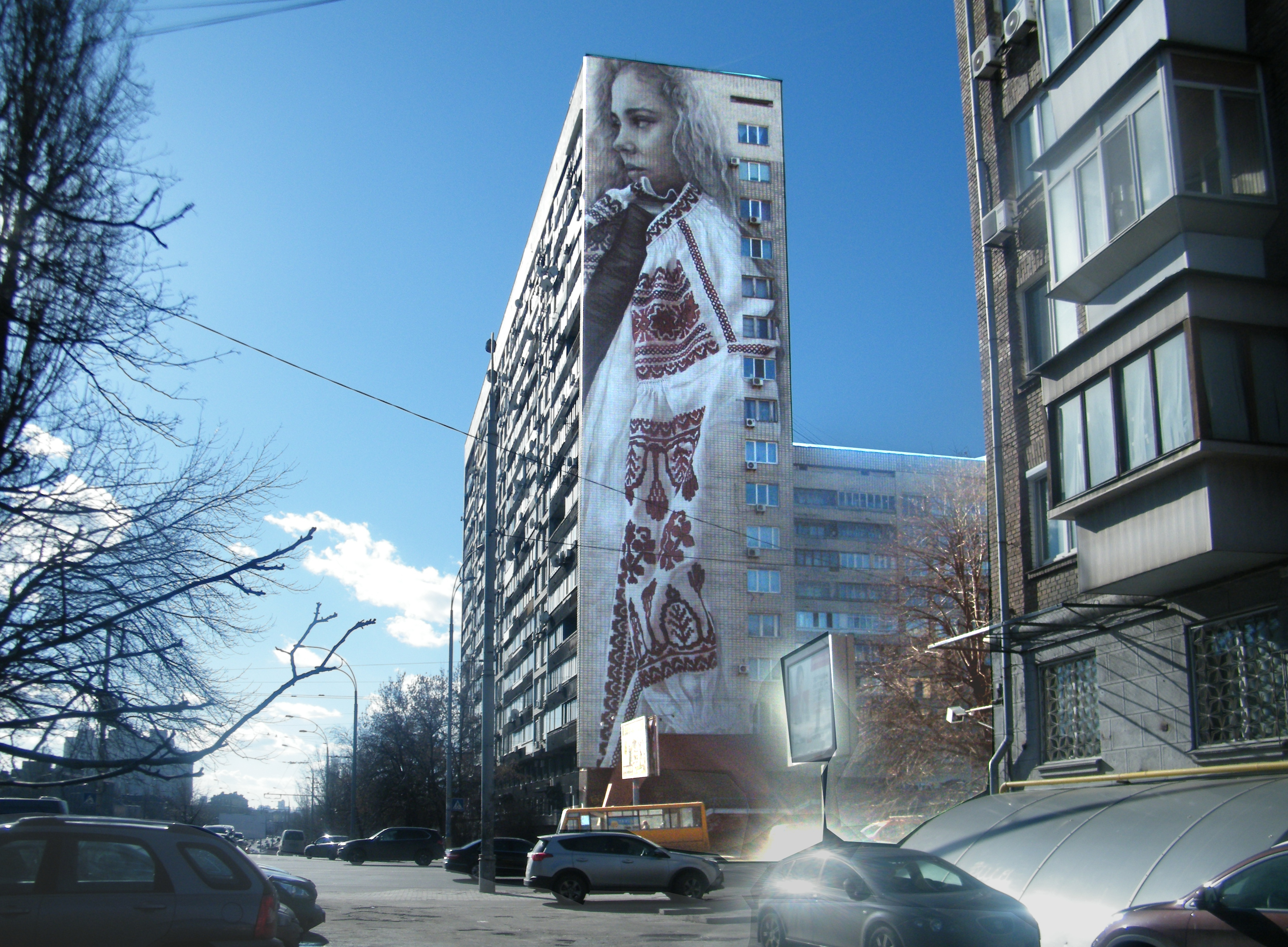
Mural by Guido van Helten on building No. 36-B

== Sources ==
- Web encyclopedia of Kyiv.
- Streets of Kyiv: a handbook. Compiled by A. M. Syhalov and others. Kyiv: Reklama [Advertising], 1975. p. 95.
- Kudrytskyi, Anatolii Viktorovych; Ponomarenko, Lidiya Antonivna; Riznyk, Oleksandr (1995). Вулиці Києва. Довідник [Streets of Kyiv: a handbook] (in Ukrainian). Kyiv: Ukrainska Entsyklopediia Imeni M.P. Bazhana. p. 120. ISBN 5-88500-070-0.
- Lesya Ukrainka Boulevard. In: Streets of Kyiv: Official Handbook. Appendix to the decision of the Kyiv City Council dated 22 January 2015 No. 34/899 “On approval of the official handbook “Streets of Kyiv City””. p. 131. Archived from the original source on 6 October 2021.
- Photomemories. Kyiv, which is not there: An annotated album of photos from 1977–1988 / author of photos V. Galaiba ; authors-compilers: M. Vinogradova and others. — K .: Golovkiivarkhitektura; NDITIAM, 2000. 408 p. : ill. ISBN 966-7452-27-1.
- Kyiv: An Encyclopedic Handbook. Editor. A. V. Kudrytsky. Kyiv: publishing house Ukrainian Soviet Encyclopedia, 1982. p. 573. (in Russian)
