= Petra Bolbochana Street =

Street in Pecherskyi District, Kyiv, Ukraine

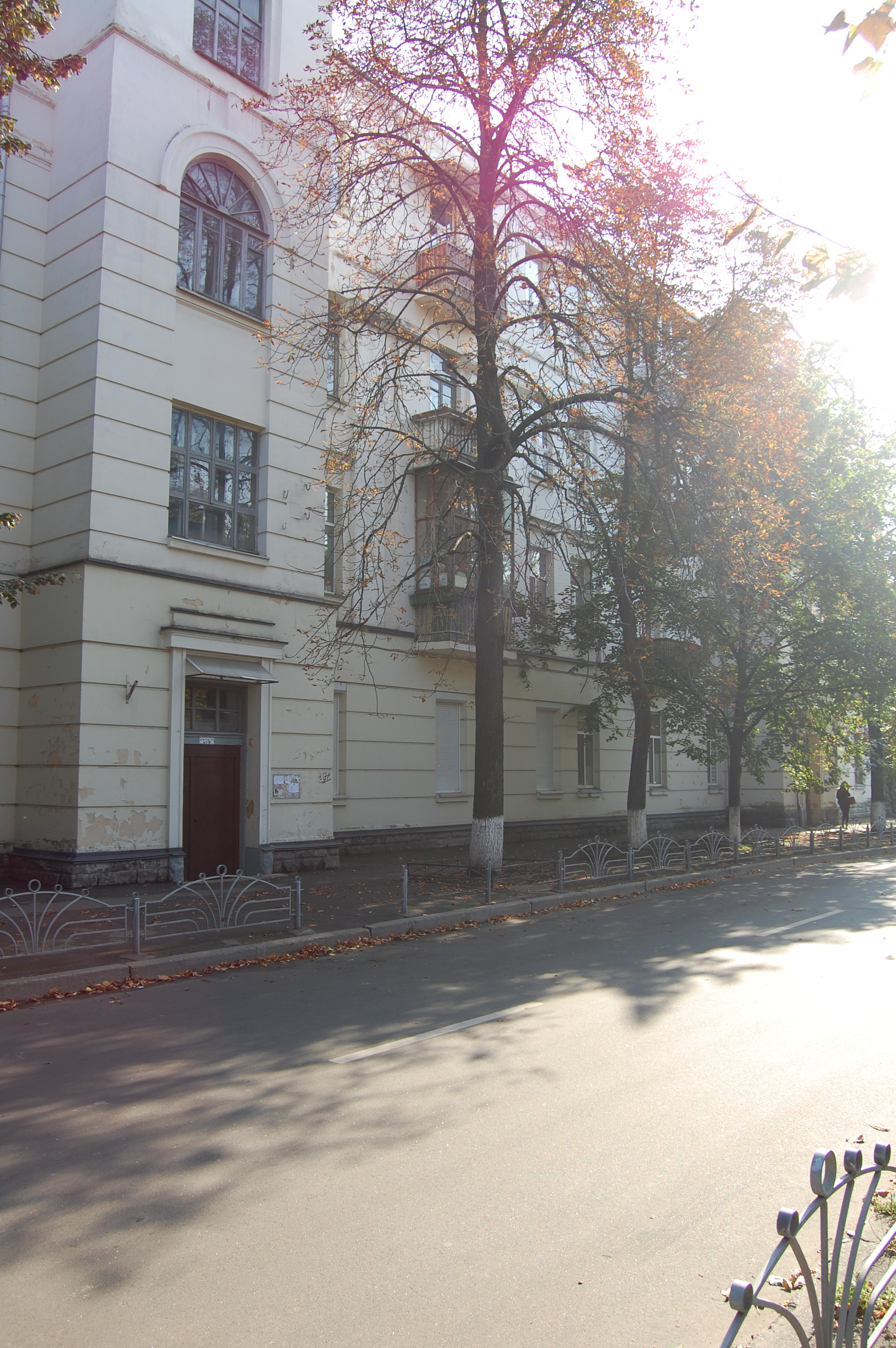
- Native name: Вулиця Петра Болбочана (Ukrainian)
- Length: 310 m (1,020 ft)
- Location: Zvirynets, Pecherskyi District; Kyiv, Ukraine
- Postal code: 01014, 01601

Petra Bolbochana Street (Ukrainian: Вулиця Петра Болбочана) is a street in the neighborhood of Zvirynets in the Pecherskyi District of Kyiv. It originates in Lesya Ukrainka Boulevard and is the location of the National Security and Defense Council of Ukraine.

== History ==
The street originated in the 19th century under the name Tserkovna (from the nearby Church of the Nativity of John the Baptist, destroyed in the 50s of the 20th century). In 1940, the street has acquired the name Leytenantska, from the former Suvorov school located along it (the name was confirmed in 1944). In 1977, it was renamed Komandarma Kamenev Street, in honor of the Soviet military figure Sergey Kamenev.

In 2015, Petra Bolbochana Street was given its current name, this time in honor of the Ukrainian military figure, colonel of the Ukrainian People's Army Petro Bolbochan.
