= Kyiv Fortress =

Complex of fortresses in Kyiv, Ukraine

Coordinates: 50°26′4″N 30°31′40″E

- Київська фортеця
- Location: 24a Hospital Street; Kyiv; Ukraine
- Public transit access: Klovska station, Palats Sportu station ( Syretsko–Pecherska line); trolleybus

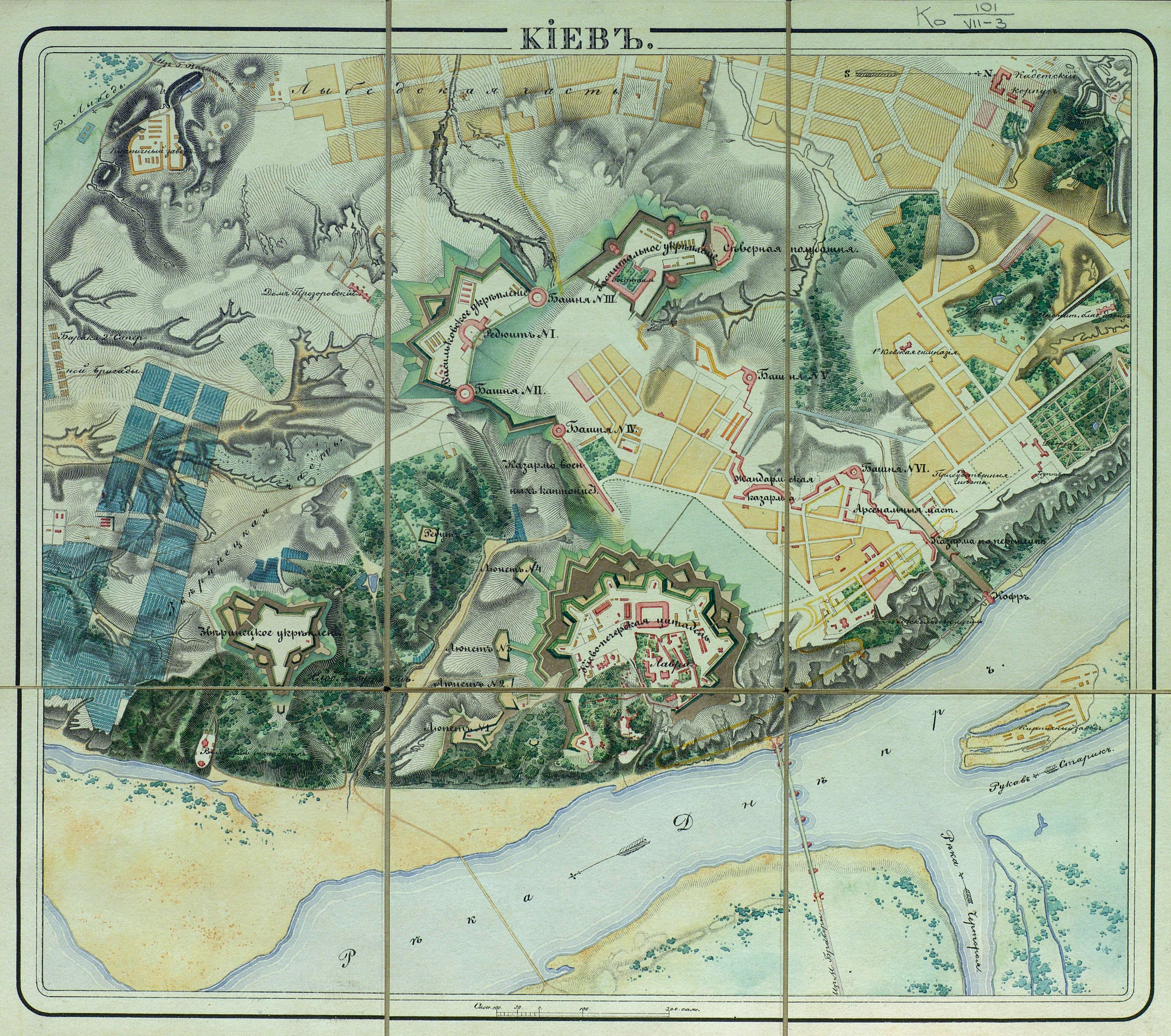
An 1830 map of the fortress

The Kyiv Fortress or Kiev Fortress (Ukrainian: Київська фортеця, romanized: Kyivska fortetsia; Russian: Киевская крепость, romanized: Kievskaya krepost, also New Pechersk Fortress) is a historical and architectural monument complex of fortifications in Kyiv, Ukraine built from the 17th through 19th centuries. Construction began after the 1654 Council in Pereiaslav, on the site of the already existing fortified monastery of Kyiv Pechersk Lavra. Located on the hills of the high right bank of the Dnieper, bounded on the north by the Klov ravine, on the south and west – by the slopes of the Lybid River valley.

The Kyiv Fortress once belonged to the extensive system of western Russian fortresses that existed in the Russian Empire. The Kyiv Fortress complex features many separate fortifications in Pechersk, Lysa Hora, Podil, Zvirynets and other city districts of Kyiv. Currently, most of the remaining structures have received a historic designation. The main fortification associated with the Kyiv Fortress (where located the Historic and Architectural Museum) is the Hospital fortification.

== Overview ==
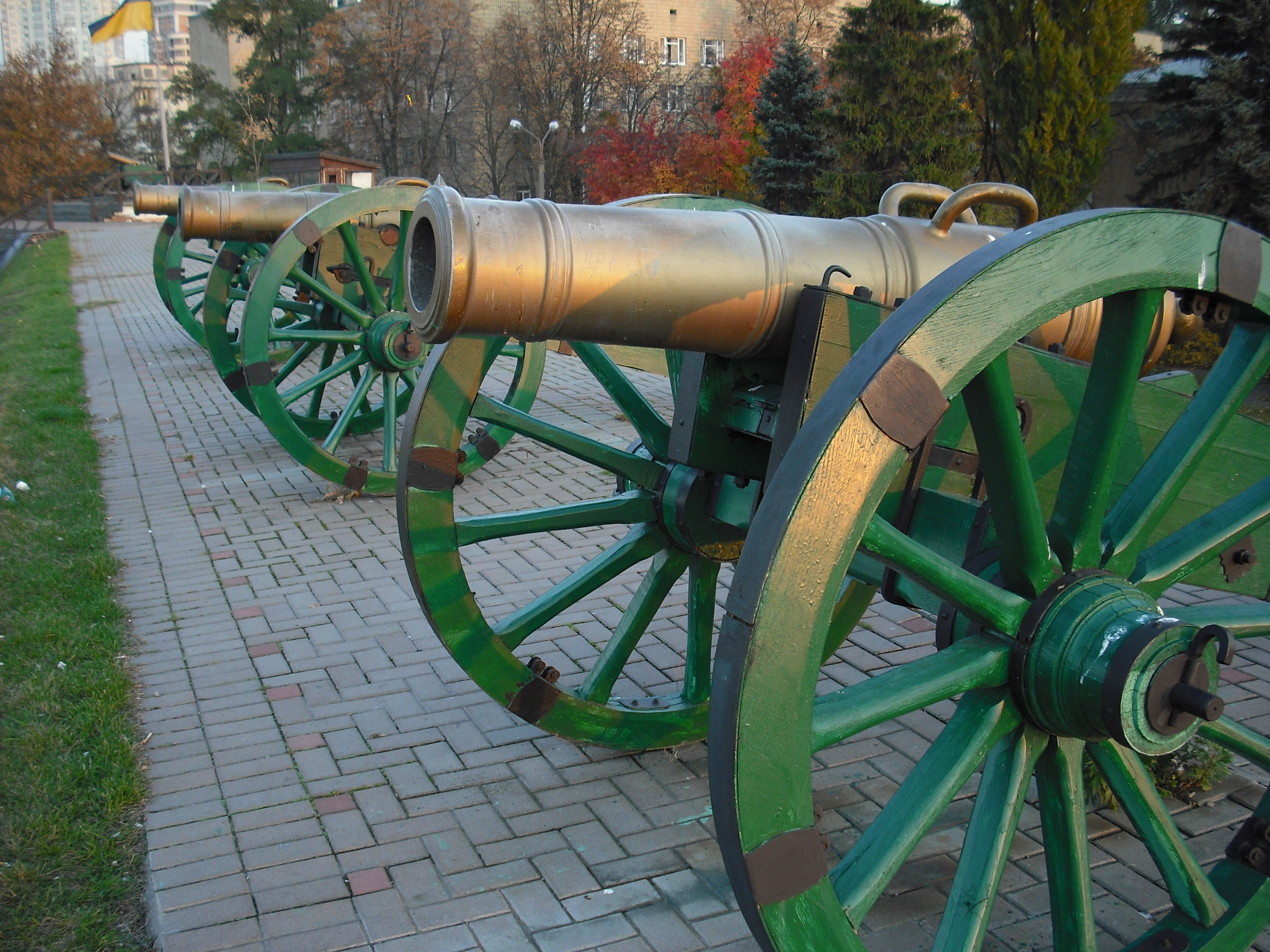
Row of artillery guns at Hospital fortifications

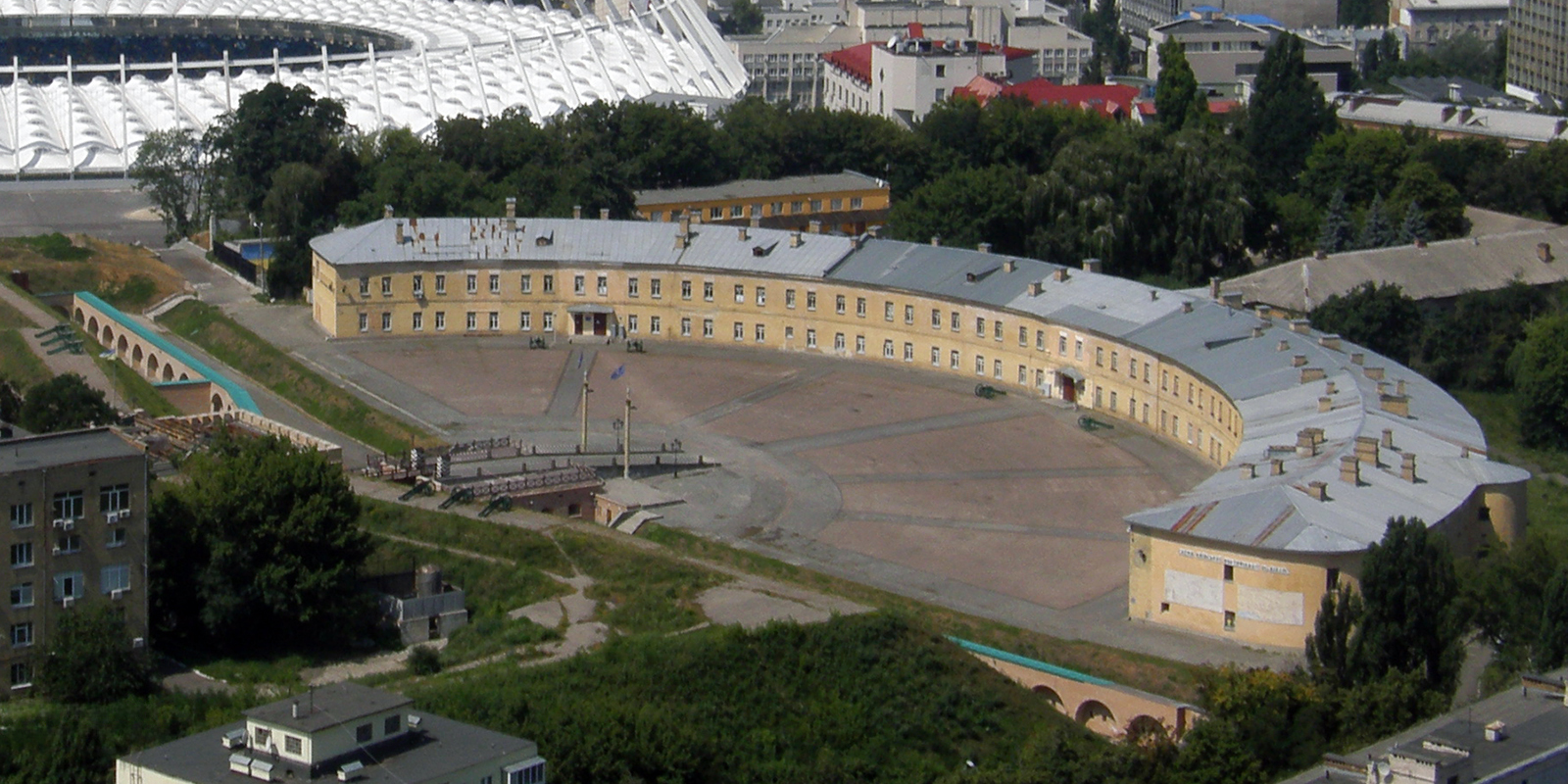
Northern Semi-tower

=== History ===
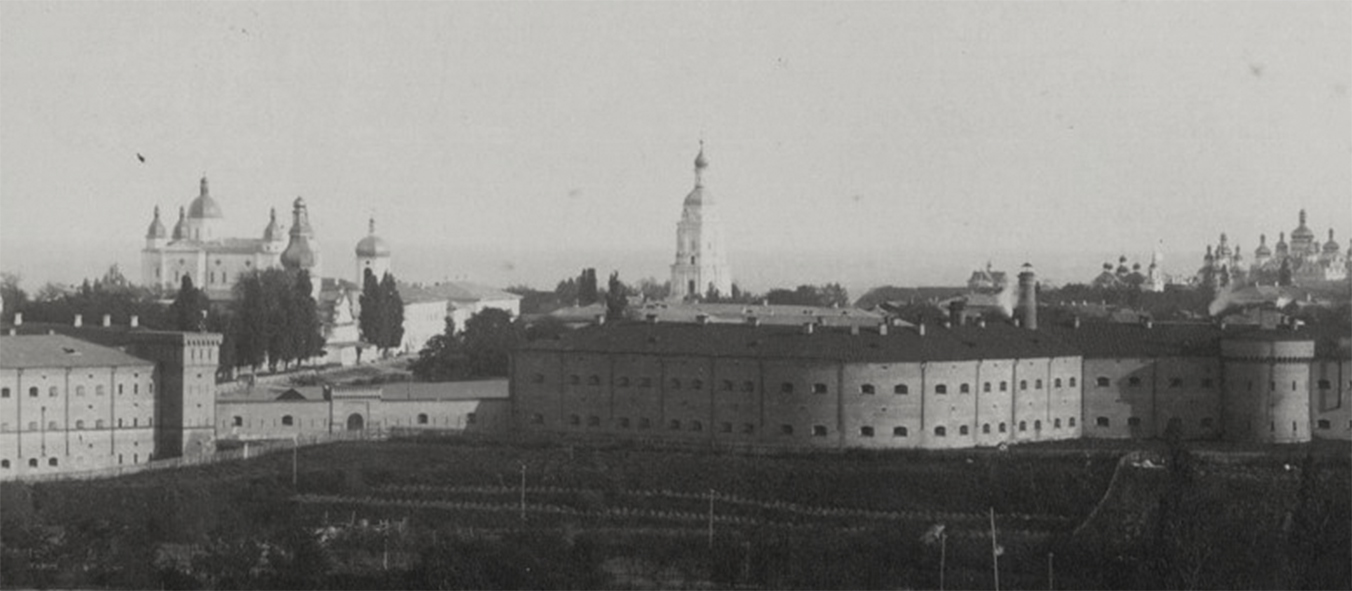
Kyiv Fortress Arsenal; In the foreground: Arsenal: St. Nicholas Gate

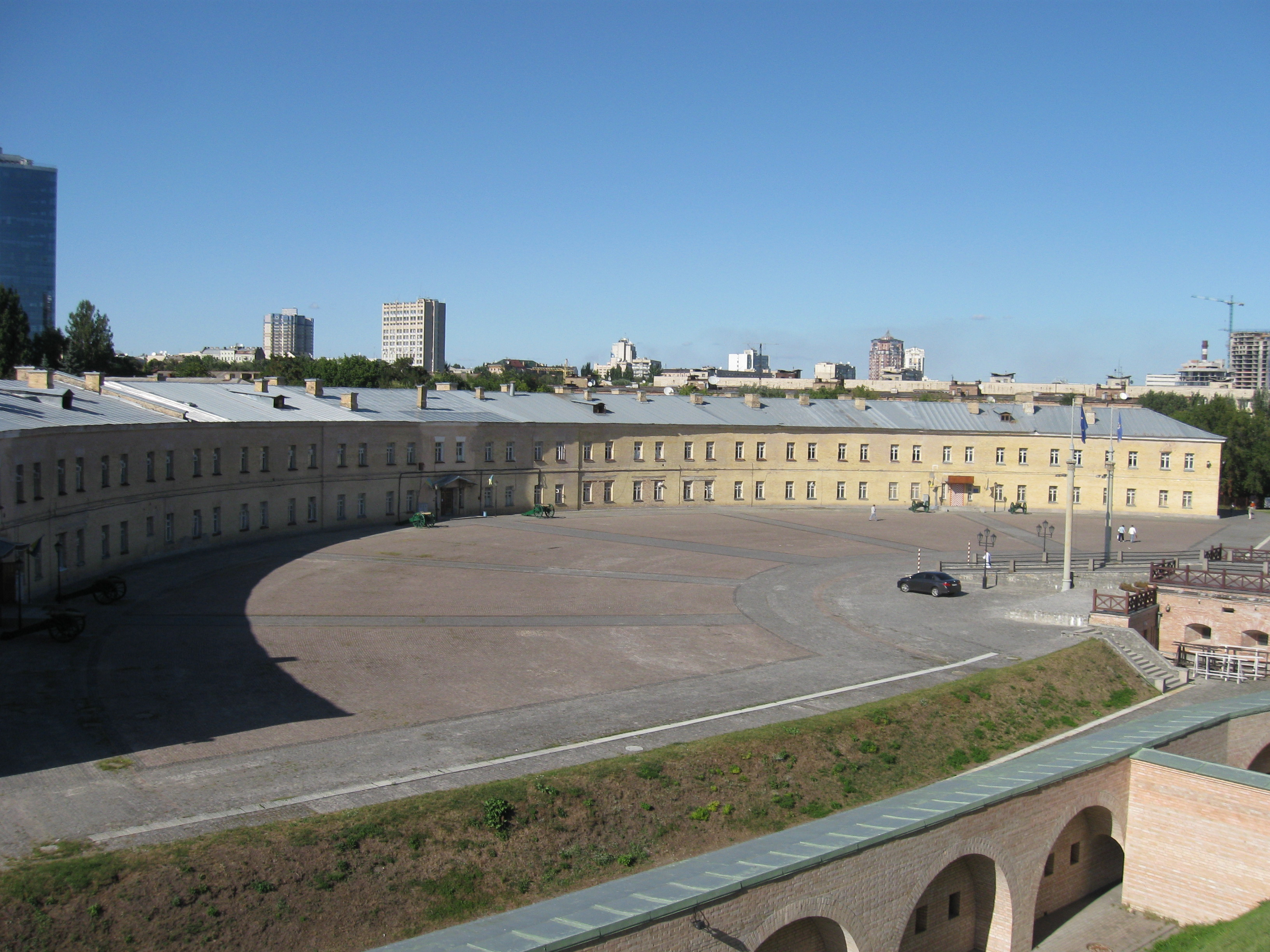
View of Kyiv Fortress, August 2009

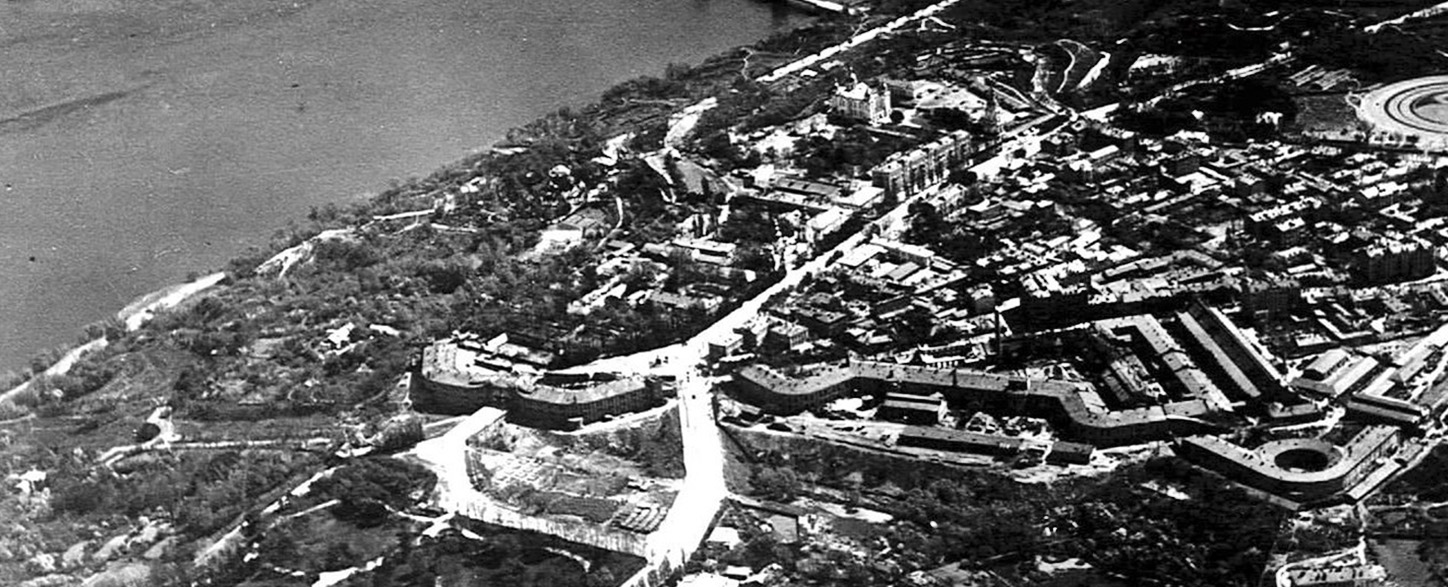
Panorama of the fortress (aerial photo, 1918)

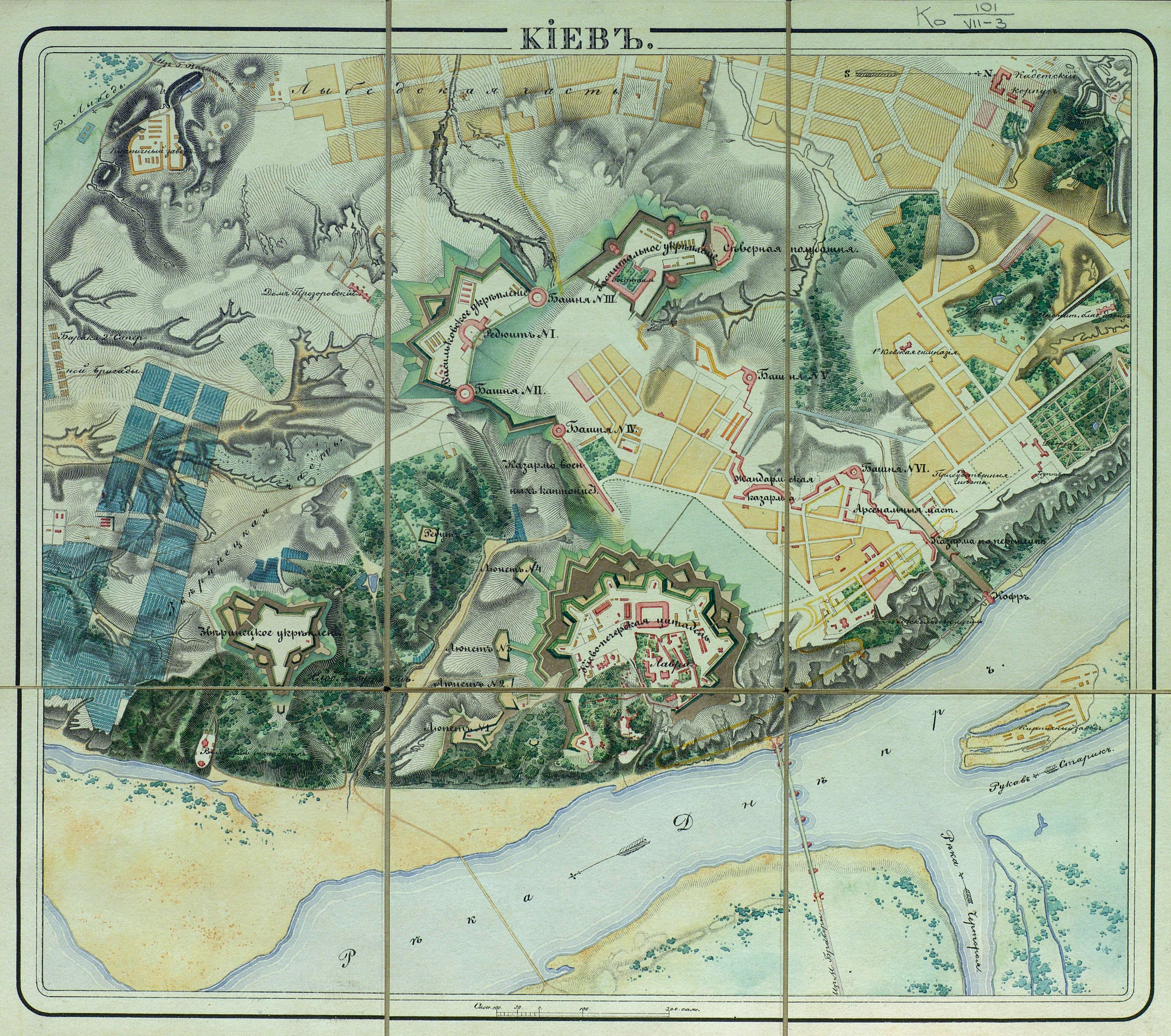
Plan of the Kiev fortress, 1830s

The history of the fortification of Kyiv began at the end of the 5th – beginning of the 6th century from the settlement on Old Kyiv (Starokyivska) hill. Then it was fortified with earthen ramparts, ditches and fences. With Kyiv gaining the designation of the capital of Kievan Rus, a large system of fortifications of the city was created. Each part of the city had its own defense system. After the defeat by Batu Khan during the siege of Kyiv (1240), the fortifications fell into disrepair.

A new stage begins during the Polish-Lithuanian rule – a fortress-castle was built on Mount Khorivytsia in Podil (Lithuanian Castle). Already under the rule of the Muscovite Kingdom, the territory of Kyiv was built up with fortress fortifications from Khreshchatyk to Pechersk – the last fortification to be built. This was done in order to prevent the penetration of the enemy through the territory of the then Ukraine to Russia.

In 1679, the Cossack troops under the leadership of Hetman Samoilovich started works to unite the Old Kyiv and Pechersk fortifications, and during the last years of the 17th century one huge fortress was formed. At the beginning of the XVIII century, the Pechersk citadel was already completely rebuilt. In 1682, the fortress was encircled by Ottoman troops but later abandoned.

Having lost their military importance in the 20th century, the buildings continued to be used as barracks, storage and incarceration facilities. Some of them played independent historical roles. The Kosyi Caponier ("Skew Caponier") became a prison for the political inmates in the 1900s–1920s and was later turned into a Soviet museum. Now it is the center of the modern museum, the National Historical and Architectural Museum "Kyiv Fortress", located on the premises of the Main Military Clinical Hospital of Kyiv. A small fortress built in 1872 on the legendary Lysa Hora ("Bald Mountain") in 1906 became a place of executions for convicted political inmates. It is now a landscape reserve and part of the museum complex.

=== Composition ===
- Old Pechersk fortresses (1655-1803)
  - Kyiv Arsenal
- New Pechersk Fortress (1831–?)
  - Citadel (Askold's Grave, 1706–)
  - Hospital fortifications (Cherepanova Hora, 1836–)
    - Northern Semi-tower
  - Vasylkiv fortifications (1831–)
  - separately built fortifications: 3 towers, 3 barracks, other fortifications
- Zvirynets fortifications (Vydubychi, 1810–1918)
- Lysohirsky Fort (Lysa Hora, 1874–?)

=== Description ===
The fortress complex consisted of about four main areas, the western side which had the hospital fortification and the Vasylkiv fortification, the northern (city) side had the Kyiv Arsenal area including government buildings and gendarme barracks, the southern side included the Kyiv-Pechersk citadel with Lavra, was reinforced with four lunettes and further to the south with Zvirynets fortification, on Trukhaniv island across Dnieper was located a brick factory.

There were seven round or semi-round fortified buildings, conditionally called towers. Three of those towers were part of the Vasylkiv fortification. One semi-tower was part of the hospital fortification.

== Notable individuals who served at the fortress ==
- Constantine Ypsilantis – served as a commandant of the Pechersk Fortress between 1807 and 1816.

== Kyiv Fortress Museum ==
Within the Kyiv Fortress is the Kyiv Fortress Museum, or Kyivska Fortetsya. It is semi-underground. The museum is housed in a 19th-century building, which was formerly a wing of the fortress.

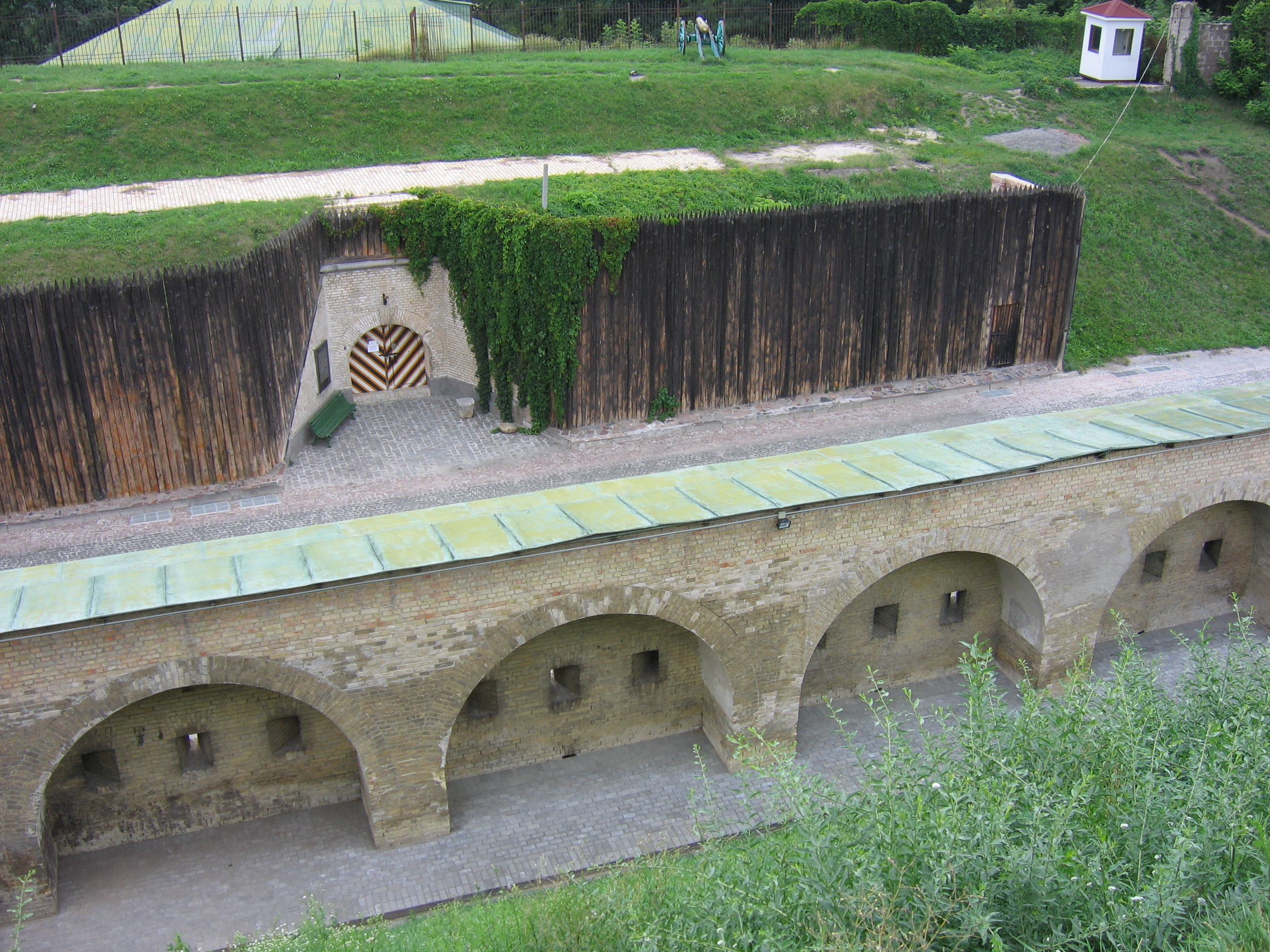
Kyiv fortress

== Gallery ==
Main gate to the Hospital fort

View from the Main gate of the Hospital fort

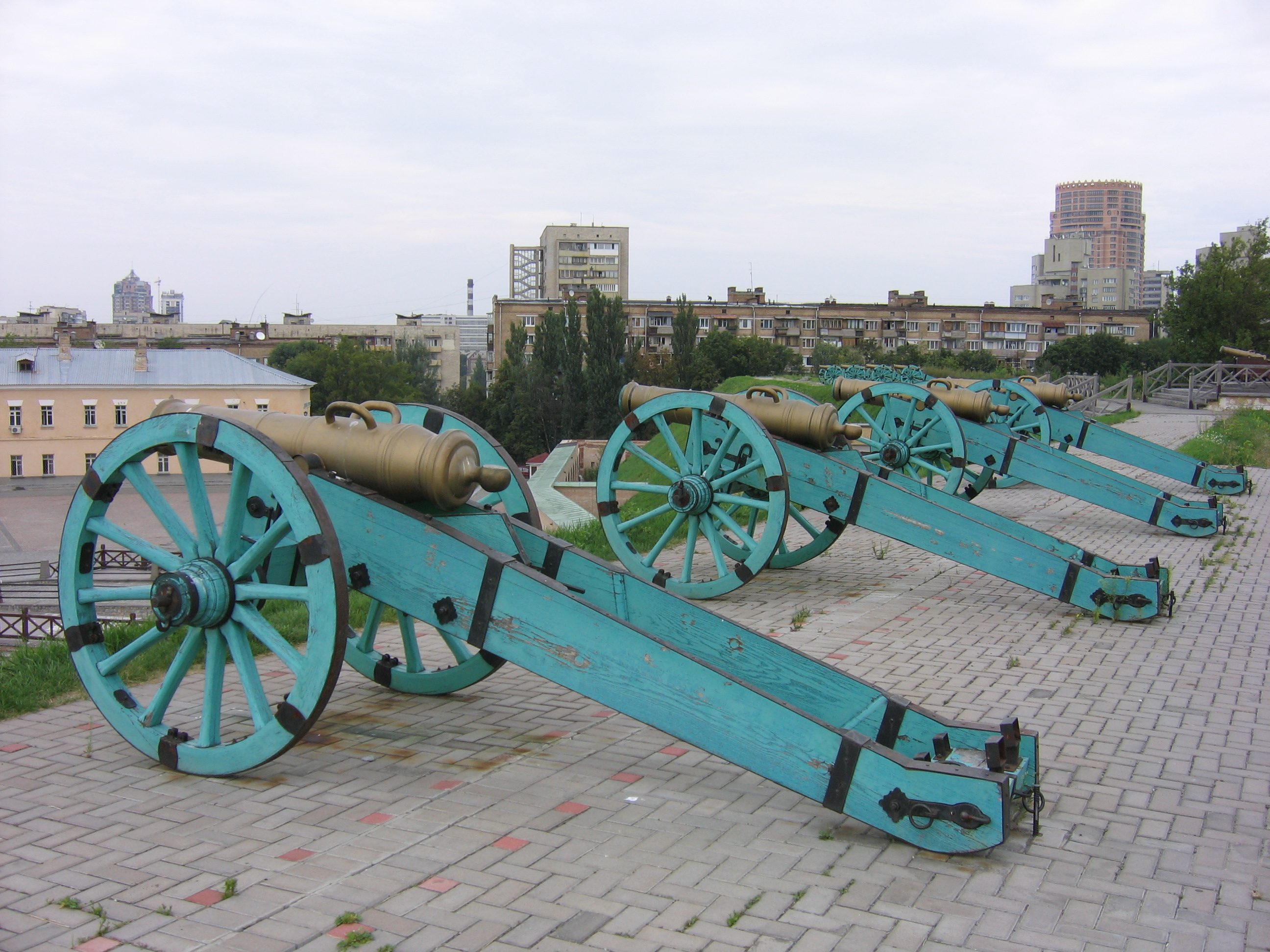
Cannons on the wall of the Hospital fort

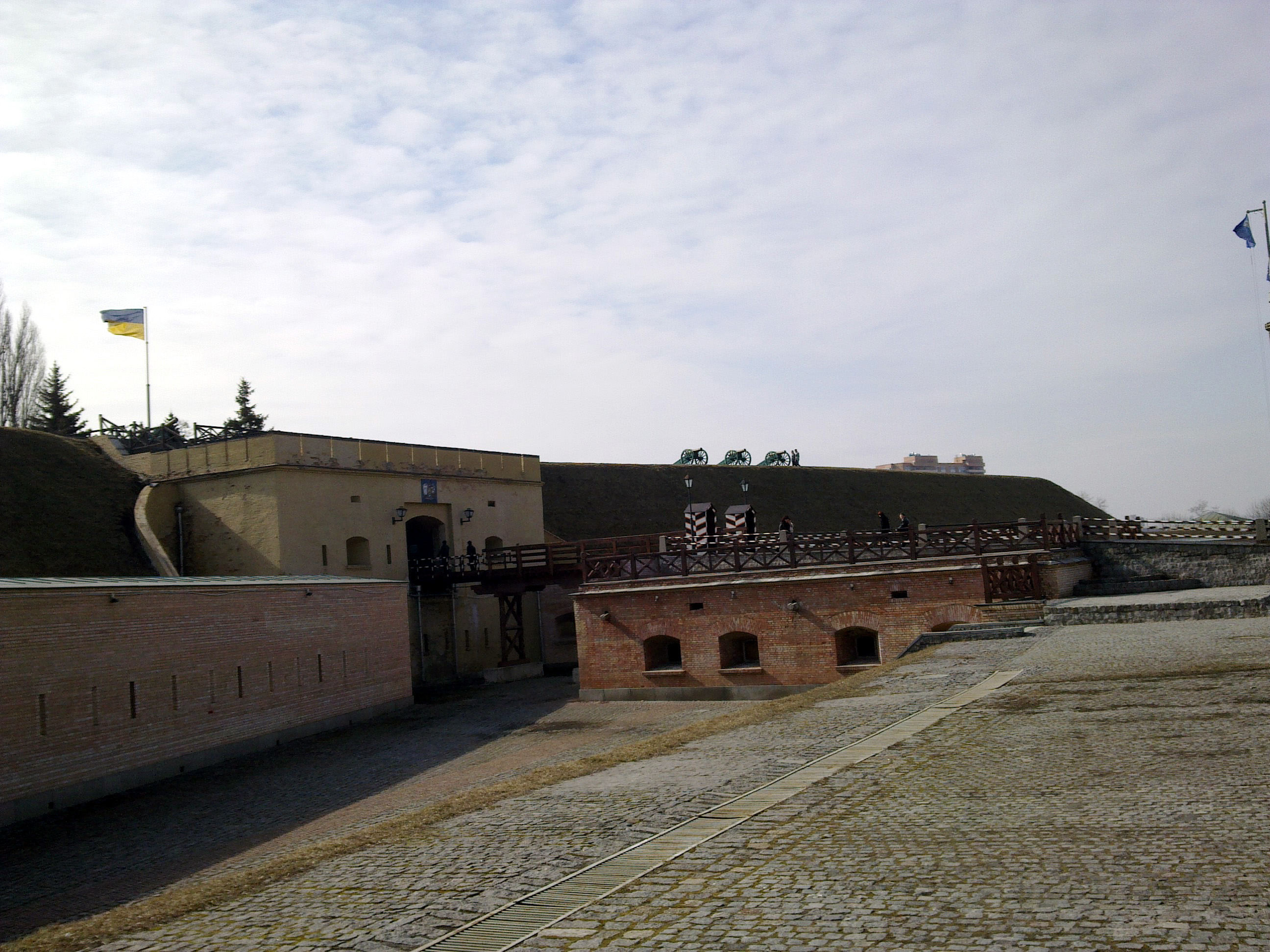
The Main gate and the wall to the Hospital fort (view from the East)

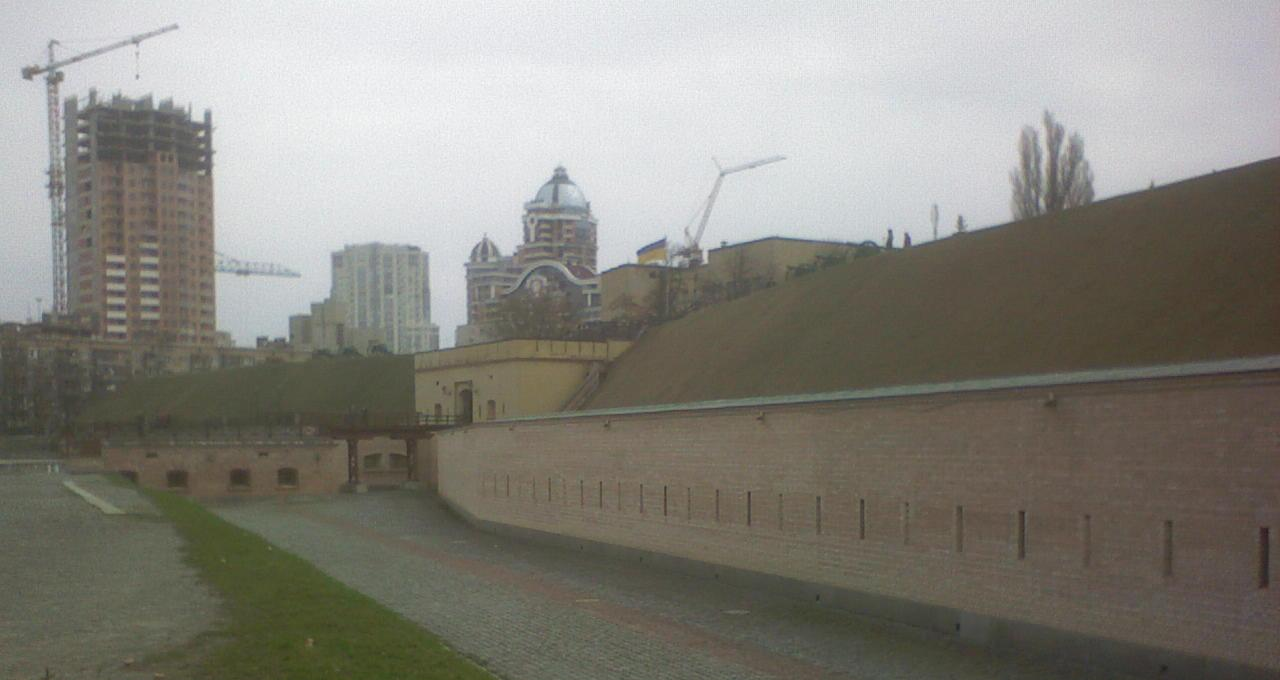
The Main gate and the wall to the Hospital fort (view from the West)

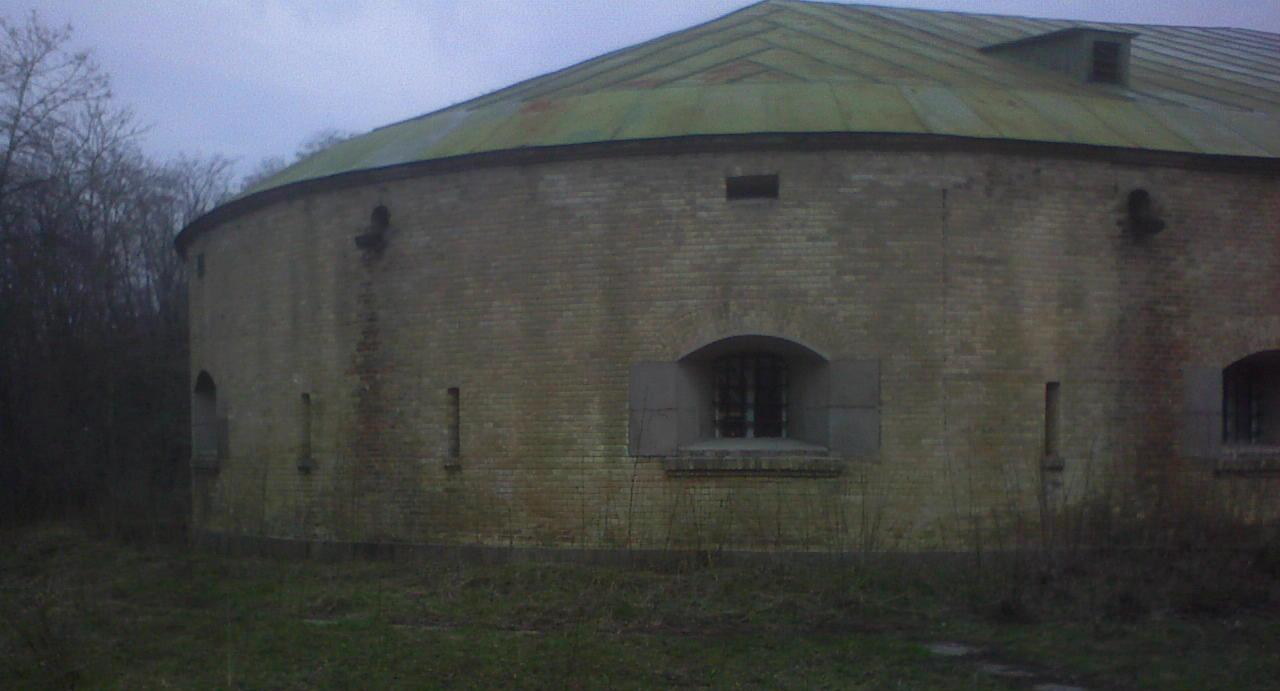
Skew Caponier

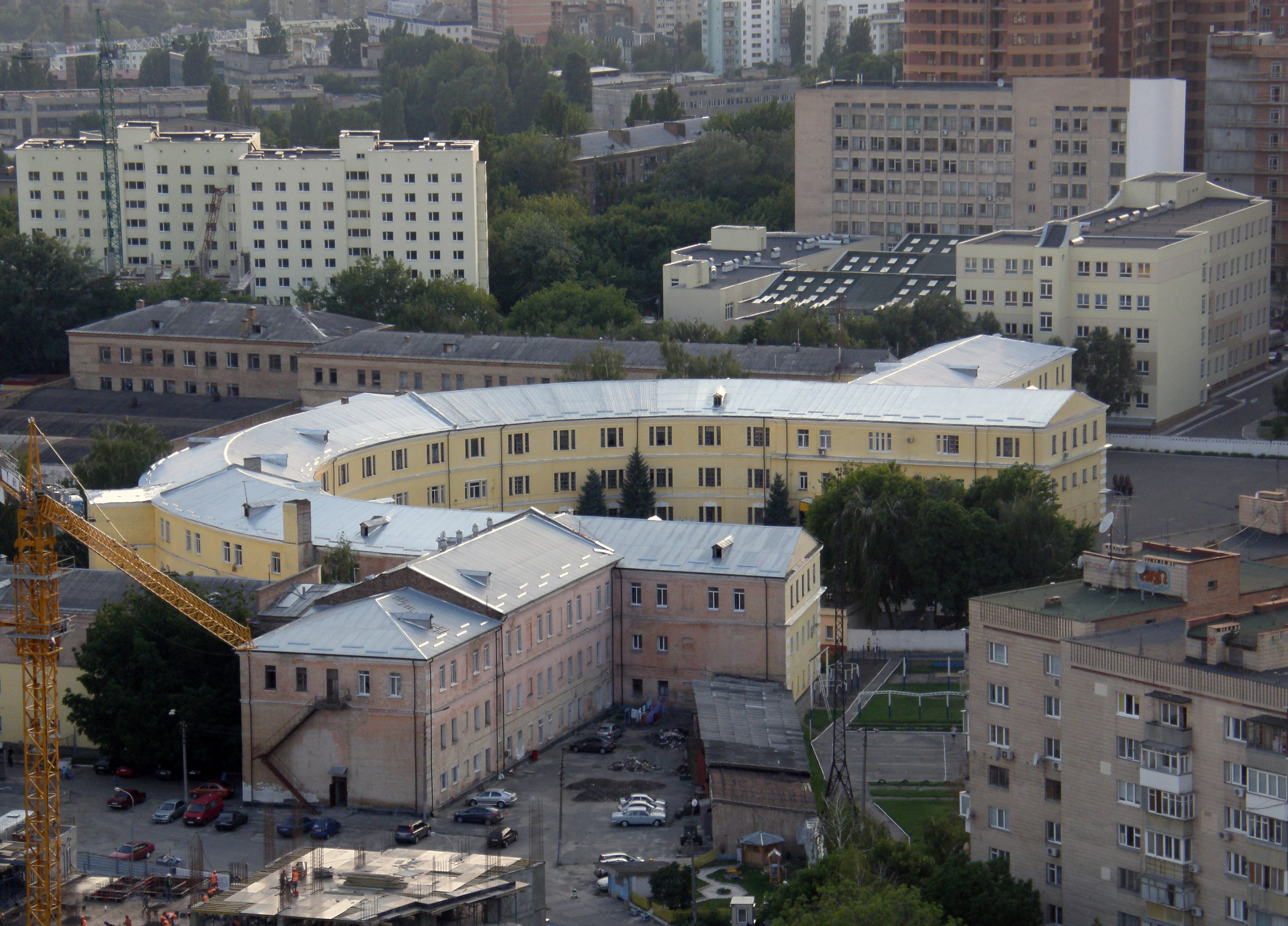
Tower No.1 (reduit, Vasylkiv fort)

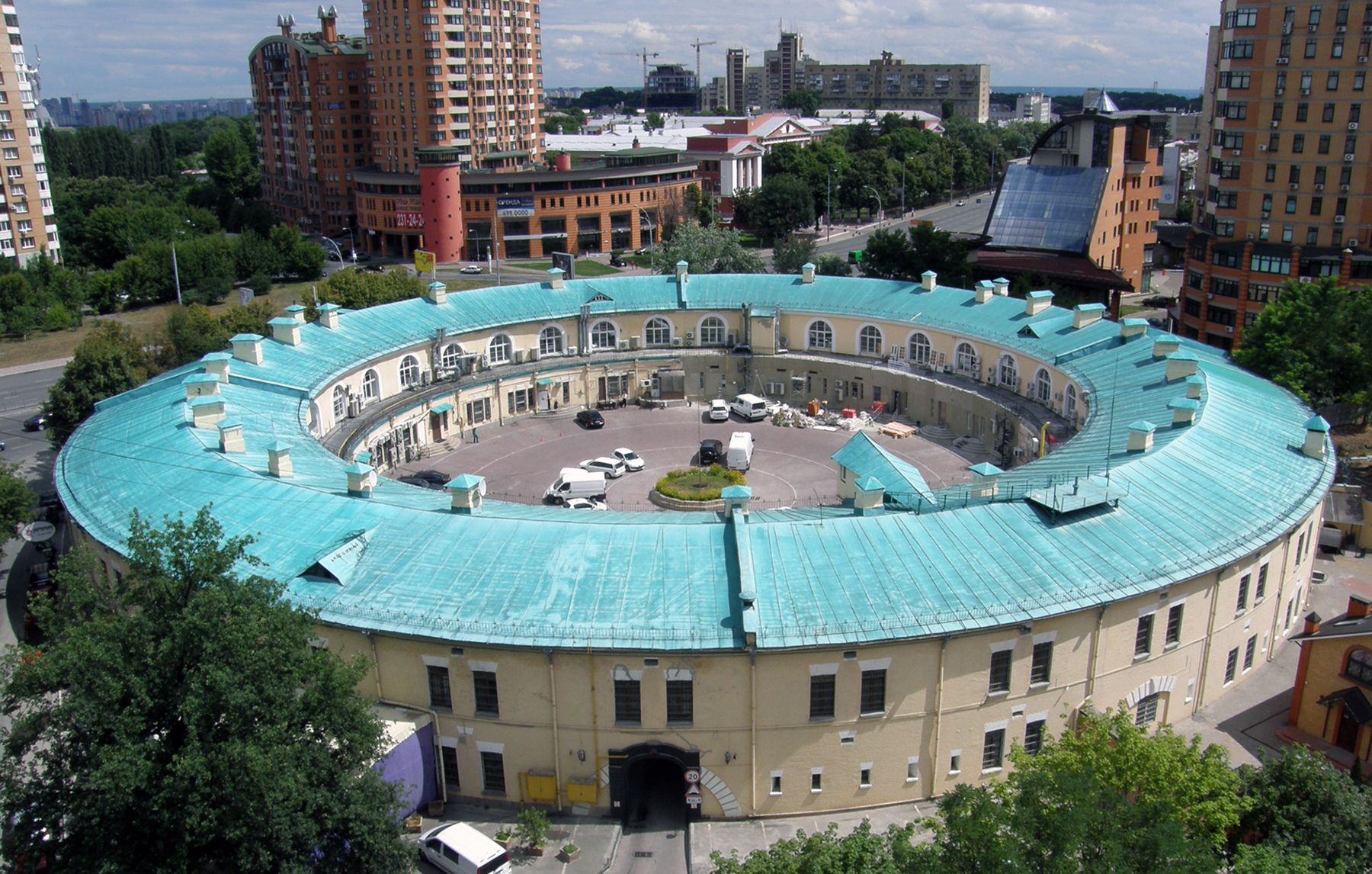
Round tower No.2 (Vasylkiv fort)

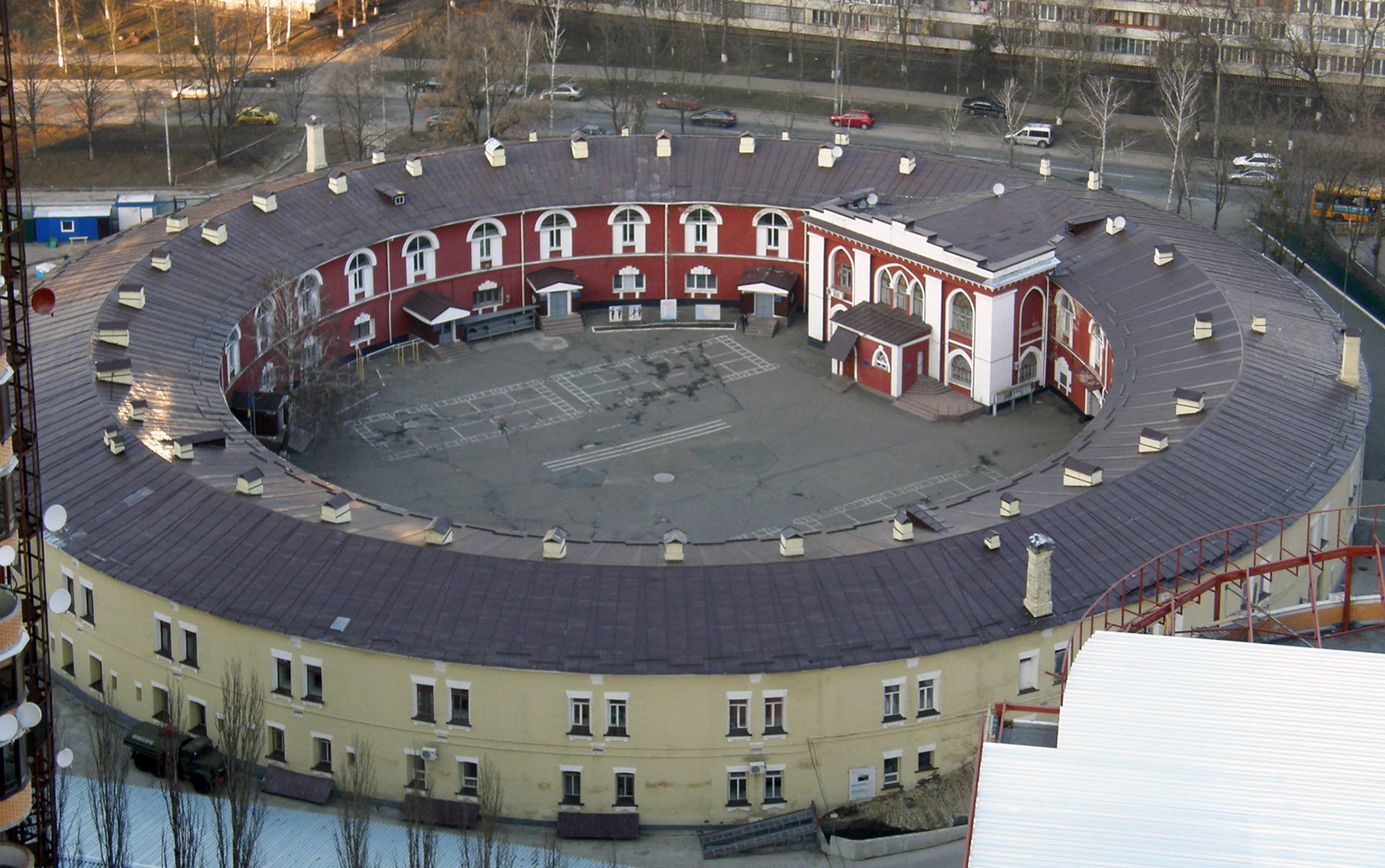
Prozorivska tower No.3 (Vasylkiv fort)

== See also ==
- Klov Palace
- Kyiv Castle
- Kyiv Fortified Region
