= Lysa Hora (Kyiv) =

Large hill in Kyiv

Coordinates: 50°23′40.03″N 30°32′41.48″E

The Lysa Hora (Ukrainian: Лиса Гора [ˈlɪsɐ ɦɔˈrɑ]); (lit. 'Bald Mountain' meaning barren, or featureless, mountain) is a large wooded hill in the Ukrainian capital Kyiv, near the confluence of the Dnipro and Lybid' rivers. The hill is now a nature reserve included in the Kyiv Fortress museum.

The mount supposedly takes its name from the fact that its top was (some slopes of the hill are still) not covered by trees. The mount is located in the Holosiiv Municipal District of Kyiv.

According to the Slavic legends, the Lysa Hora hill is the largest and most famous location of the mystical "bald mountain" — a traditional site of the witch gatherings. Particularly, it is asserted in the works of the Ukrainian writer Nikolai Gogol, as well as in Night on Bald Mountain, the 1867 composition by Modest Mussorgsky in which St. John sees a witches' Sabbath on the mountain.

== Forts of Lysa Hora ==
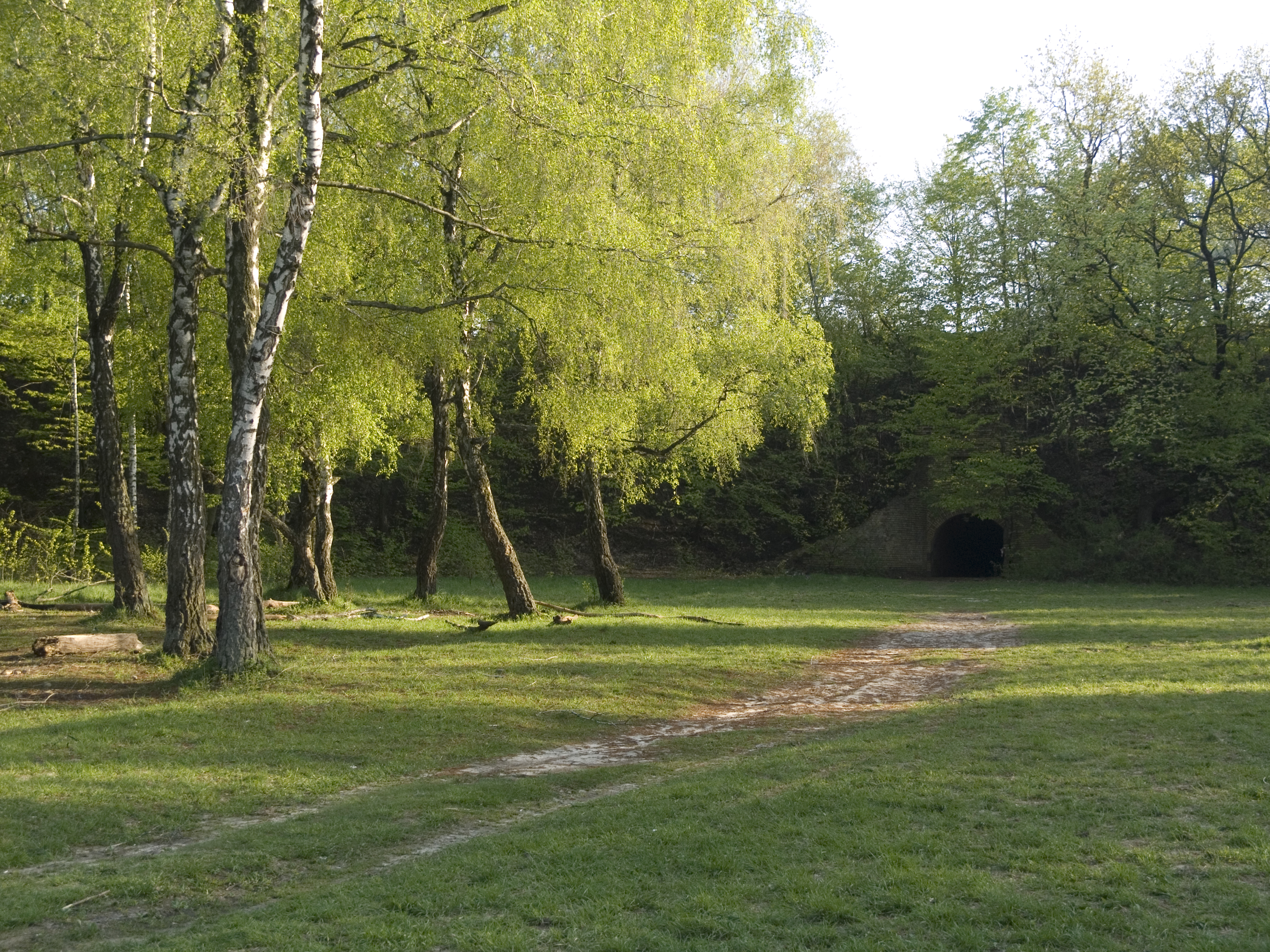
Top of the Lysa Hora in spring

In 1872, a small fortress (part of the Kyiv Fortress) was built on the hill by the Russian army. However, upon completion, the fortress was found to be of little military importance and was converted into the military storehouse. Due to its relatively remote location, from 1906 the fortress was used as an execution place for convicted political prisoners of the Tsarist government. Over 200 people were executed there by hanging between 1906 and 1917, one of them was Dmitry Bogrov, the assassin of Pyotr Stolypin.

The fortress saw fierce fighting during the World War II, when a unit of local defence volunteers resisted the Nazi offensive on Kyiv.

Later, the Red Army used the fortress as storage area till 1980. An underground complex beneath the fortress is sometimes mentioned, but in fact only old water tanks can be found, still filled with rain water. In the 1980s, a radio beacon for aircraft navigation was built on the Lysa Hora.

== See also ==
- Lysa Hora (folklore)
- St. John's Eve (short story)
- Zamkova Hora
- Night on Bald Mountain
