= Cherepanova Hora =

Historical neighbourhood of Kyiv, Ukraine

Coordinates: 50.434°N 30.520°E

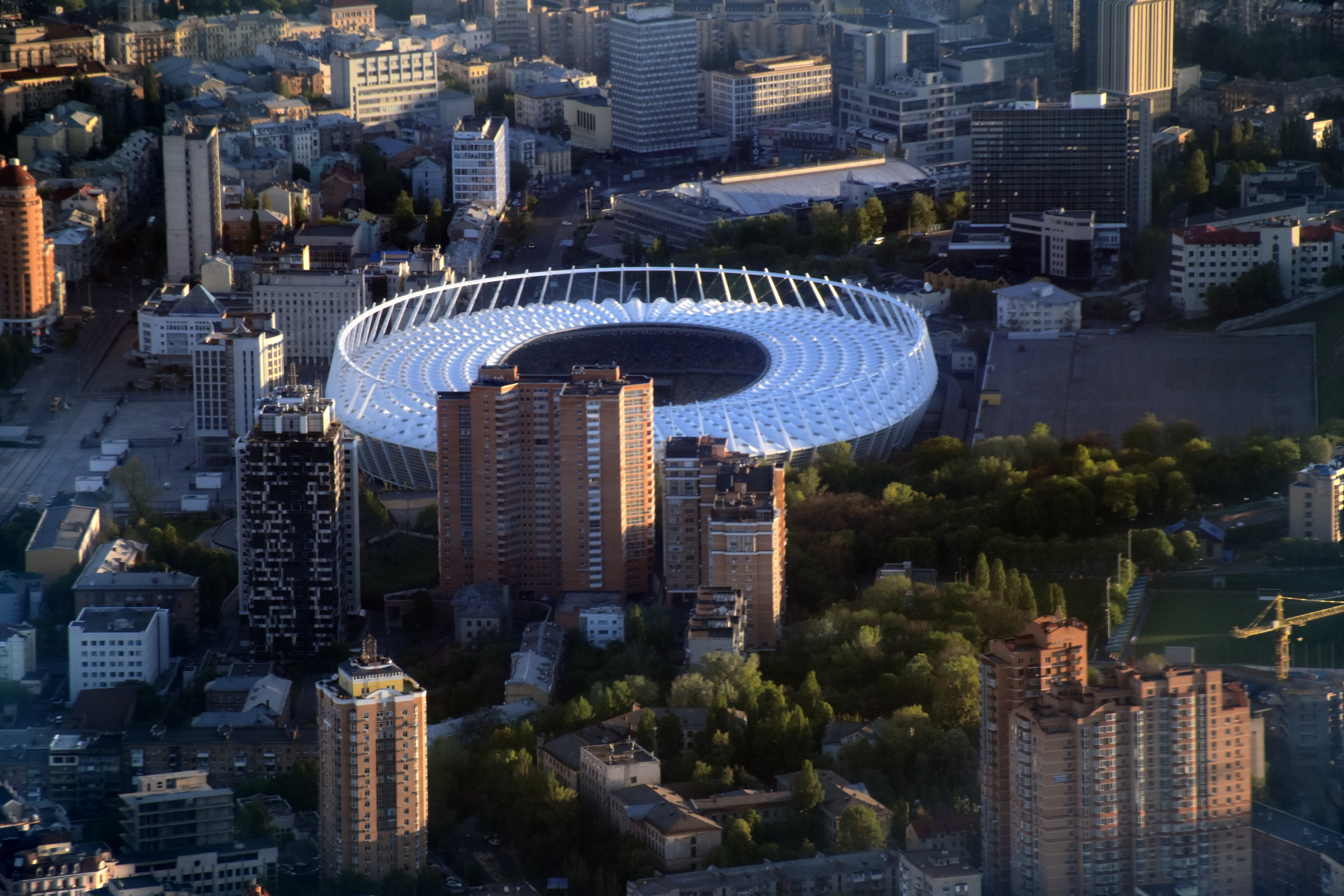
Aerial view of Cherepanova Hora with Olympic Stadium in the background

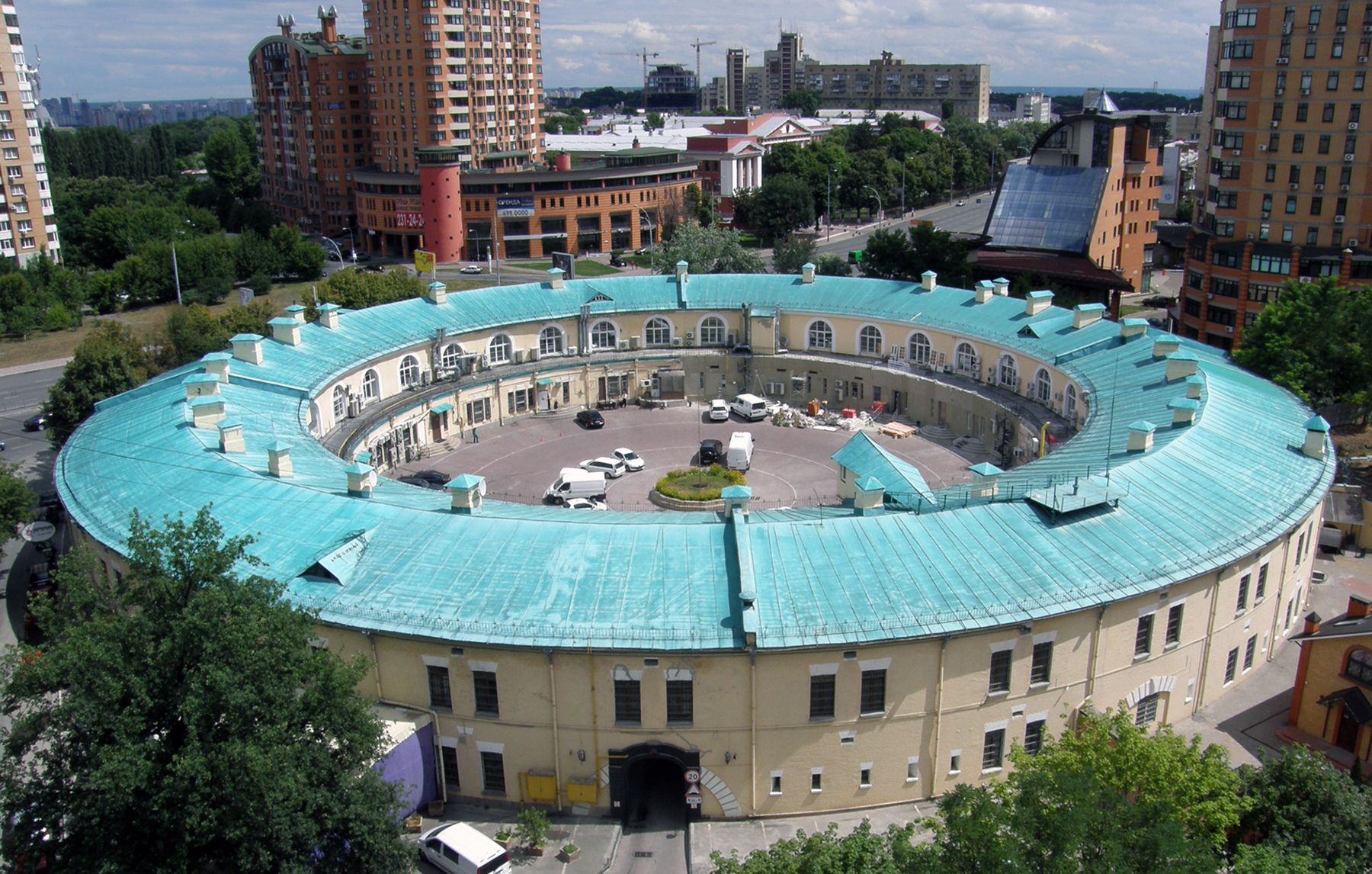
Tower #2 of the Kyiv Fortress' Vasylkiv fortification

Cherepanova Hora (Ukrainian: Черепанова гора) is a historical neighbourhood of Kyiv and an elevation. Geographically, the area is part of Kyiv Upland, rising 185 meters above the sea.

A good portion of the neighborhood is part of the National Sports Complex in Kyiv. Besides the main Olympic Stadium, there is also a smaller Bannikov Stadium, which originally was built as a training field for the main stadium. In the same vicinity is the House of Football, which serves as the headquarters of Ukraine's football officials. In 2018, a Sheraton hotel was opened right next to the main Olympic Stadium.

Among other important landmarks are a complex of buildings and fortifications of the Kyiv Fortress, a main military hospital, National University of Ukraine on Physical Education and Sport and its short-course swimming pool, an indoor sports complex "Palace of Sports", Kyiv National Academic Theatre of Operetta, Kyiv Planetarium, several hotels like Rus Hotel, Prezydent-hotel, Park Inn by Radisson, and others.

== History ==
Following the second partition of Poland in 1793, the Imperial Russia annexed most of the territory, which was referred to as the Right-bank Ukraine.

Soon thereafter, the Cherepanova Hora (hill), as a reference, appeared on the outskirts of today's Kyiv, where a Moscow-appointed civil governor of Kyiv, Pavel Cherepanov, had his manor on top of the hill. The area belonged to the Old Pechersk Fortress around the Kyiv Pechersk Monastery that was built earlier during the time of Peter the Great. By the end of the 18th century, the frontier fortress had declined, and in 1830, the fortress was rebuilt completely. At the foot of the hill stretched an esplanade, an empty and open space between the citadel and the city, which in modern times is the name of the street Esplanadna.

Today on the hill are located basic structures of the New Pechersk Fortress (Hospital fortifications), a complex which today is part of the museum-sanctuary "Kyiv Fortress" and a military hospital. Nearby is also located the Kosyi (Oblique) Caponier, known as the "Kyiv Shlisselburg" serving as a political prison from 1863 to 1918.

In 1897 slopes of the hill were decorated with pavilions of the All-Russian Industrial Exposition and designed by such architects as Władysław Horodecki, Kobelev, and Zhuravsky. The pavilions of that exposition remained until 1909.

In 1913 there took place the All-Russian Industrial and Agrarian Exposition.

Sometimes, at the beginning of the 20th century, on the hill was created the Alekseevskiy Park.

Following the hostilities of World War I and the so-called Russian Civil War, in the 1920s there was built a stadium known as the Trotsky Red Stadium, today better known as the Olimpiyskiy National Sports Complex.

=== Alekseevskiy Park ===
The park was established on 12 March 1914 by the Kyiv city authorities following the end of the All-Russian Industrial and Agrarian Exposition, which took place from 29 May to 15 October 1913. The park was named after Tsarevich Alexei. The Kyiv City Duma special commission analyzed that the prospective park could afford to preserve some of the pavilions of the former exposition by leasing them out.
