= Zvirynets =

Zvirynets Звіринець
- Neighborhood of Kyiv
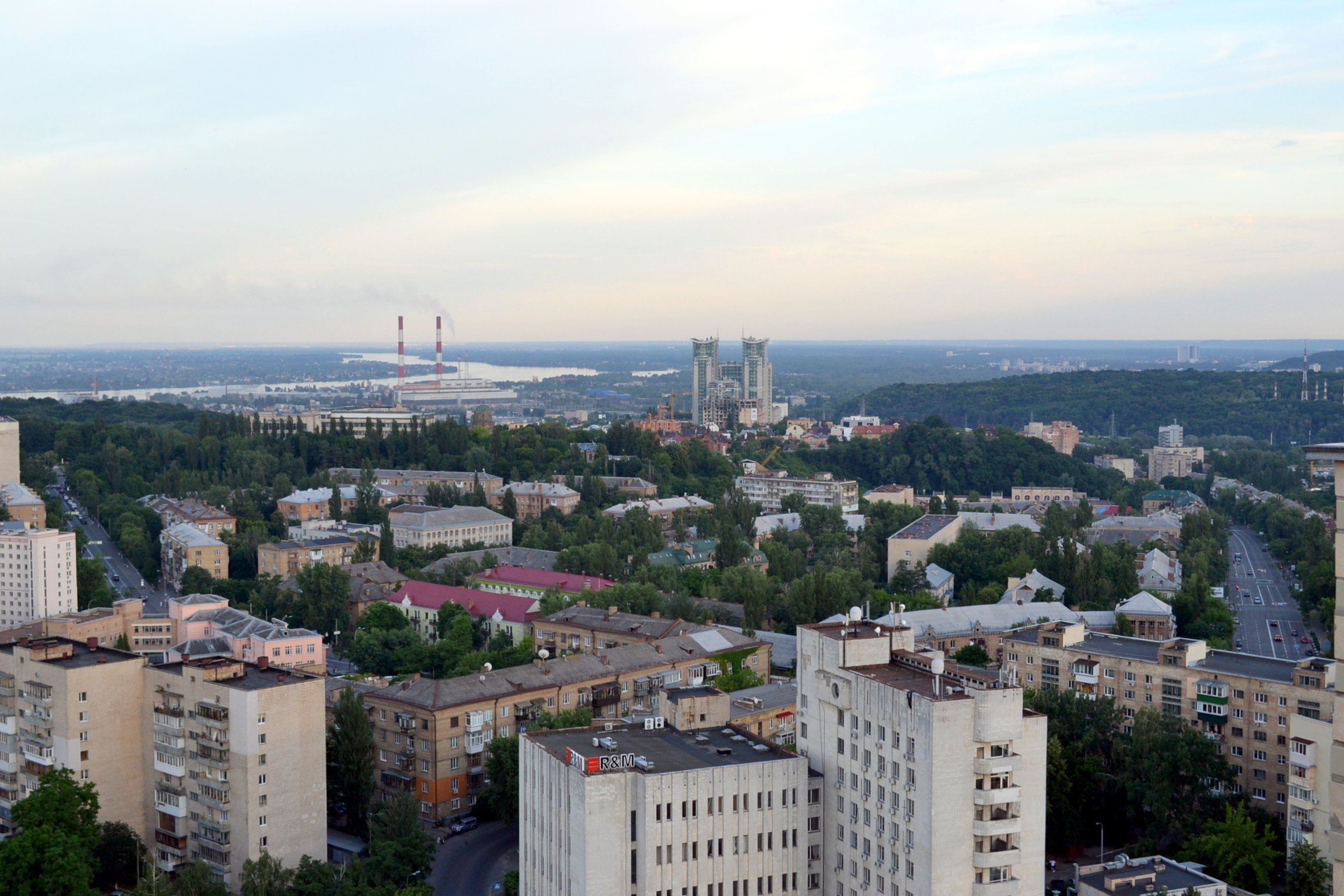
- Interactive map of Zvirynets
- Country: Ukraine
- Municipality: Kyiv
- District: Pecherskyi District
- Time zone: UTC+2 (EET)
  - Summer (DST): UTC+3 (EEST)

Zvirynets (Ukrainian: Звіринець, pronounced [z⁽ʲ⁾wiˈrɪnetsʲ]) is a neighborhood of the city Kyiv, the capital of Ukraine. It is a part of the administrative Pecherskyi District.

== History ==
In 10th century, a cave monastery was founded in Zvirynets. It was ruined by the Cumans in 11th century, but its caves have survived to this day.

In 1918, an explosion occurred at the artillery warehouses; this resulted in most of the former buildings of Zvirynets being destroyed.

In the mid-2000s, a Baptist church "Peace, Love and Unity" was built in the Zvirynets neighborhood.

The Kyiv Metro station Zvirynetska is named after the neighborhood.
