= Taras Tkachuk =

Ukrainian historian, archaeologist, cultural critic (born 1960)

- Тарас Михайлович Ткачук
- Born: 6 February 1960 (age 66); Lviv
- Education: Taras Shevchenko National University of Kyiv
- Occupations: Historian, archaeologist, cultural critic, researcher of Trypillian ornamentation

Taras Tkachuk (Ukrainian: Тарас Михайлович Ткачук; 6 February 1960) is a Ukrainian historian, archaeologist, cultural critic, researcher of Trypillian ornamentation, Candidate of Historical Sciences (1996). Member of the European Association of Archaeologists.

== Biography ==
Taras Tkachuk was born on 6 February 1960 in Lviv.

In 1987, he graduated from the Faculty of History of Taras Shevchenko National University of Kyiv, and in 1995 he completed his postgraduate studies at the Institute of Archeology of the National Academy of Sciences of Ukraine. In 1985–1992, he worked as a senior laboratory assistant at the Institute of Archeology of the National Academy of Sciences of Ukraine, and from 1996 he has been the head of the Archeology Department of the Ancient Halych National Reserve.

Founder of the public organization "Galician Scientific Historical and Cultural Society".

=== Research activity ===
In 1996, he defended his Candidate's dissertation on "Орнаментація мальованого посуду культури Трипілля-Кукутені як знакові системи".

Participant in archaeological research, particularly at Trypillian settlements, including: Bernashivka, Bodaky, Maidanetske, Odaiv, Talianky, Verteba Cave, and others. During 1999–2002, he studied the multilayered settlement of Bilshivtsi, located in the Kuty tract. As a member of the expedition of the National Reserve "Ancient Halych" he researches Trypillian settlements. In July 2022, he led an expedition that discovered ceramics and other household items from the Early Trypillian period (mid-5th millennium BC) during excavations between the villages of Zalukva and Krylos.

In 2003-2004 he was a Fulbright Program (curated by Ian Hodder). While studying in the United States, he studied the prehistoric Anasazi Indian culture.

His research interests include Neo-Enelite archaeology of Southwest Europe, semiotics, philosophy and methodology of science.

== Works ==
Author of 70 scientific publications.

Monographs:

- Орнаментація мальованого посуду трипільсько-кукутенської спільності як знакові системи (етапи βІІ–СІІ–γІІ) (1996)
- Знакові системи трипільсько-кукутенської культурно-історичної спільності (мальований посуд етапів βІІ–СІІ–γІІ) (2005)
- Семіотичний аналіз трипільсько-кукутенських знакових систем (мальований посуд) (2005, co-authored with Yaroslav Melnyk)

Books:

- Галицькі керамічні плитки із рельєфними зображеннями та гончарні клейма. Каталог (1997)
- Знакові системи трипільсько-кукутенської культурно-історичної спільності (мальований посуд; 2005, Ч. 1.)
- Знакові сиситеми трипільсько-кукутенської культурно-історичної спільності (мальований посуд; 2005, Ч. 2.) (co-author)
- Bilcze Złote. Materials of the Tripolye culture from the Werteba and the Ogród sites (2013, co-author)
- Biały Potok. Materiały z badań Józefa Kostrzewskiego na Podolu (2016, co-author)
- Багатошарове поселення Більшівці (ур. Кути) на Верхньому Подністров'ї. Збори П. Перекліти. Дослідження 1999 р. T. 1. (1999, co-author), Т. 2. (2018, co-author), Ч. 3. (2020, co-author)
- Багатошарове поселення Більшівці (ур. Кути) на Верхньому Подністров'ї (дослідження 2002, 2005 рр) (2022)
- Багатошарове поселення Більшівці (ур. Кути) на Верхньому Подністров'ї. Дослідження 2006 року (2023)
