= Halych =

Urban locality in Ivano-Frankivsk Oblast, Ukraine

Halych Галич Halyč
- City
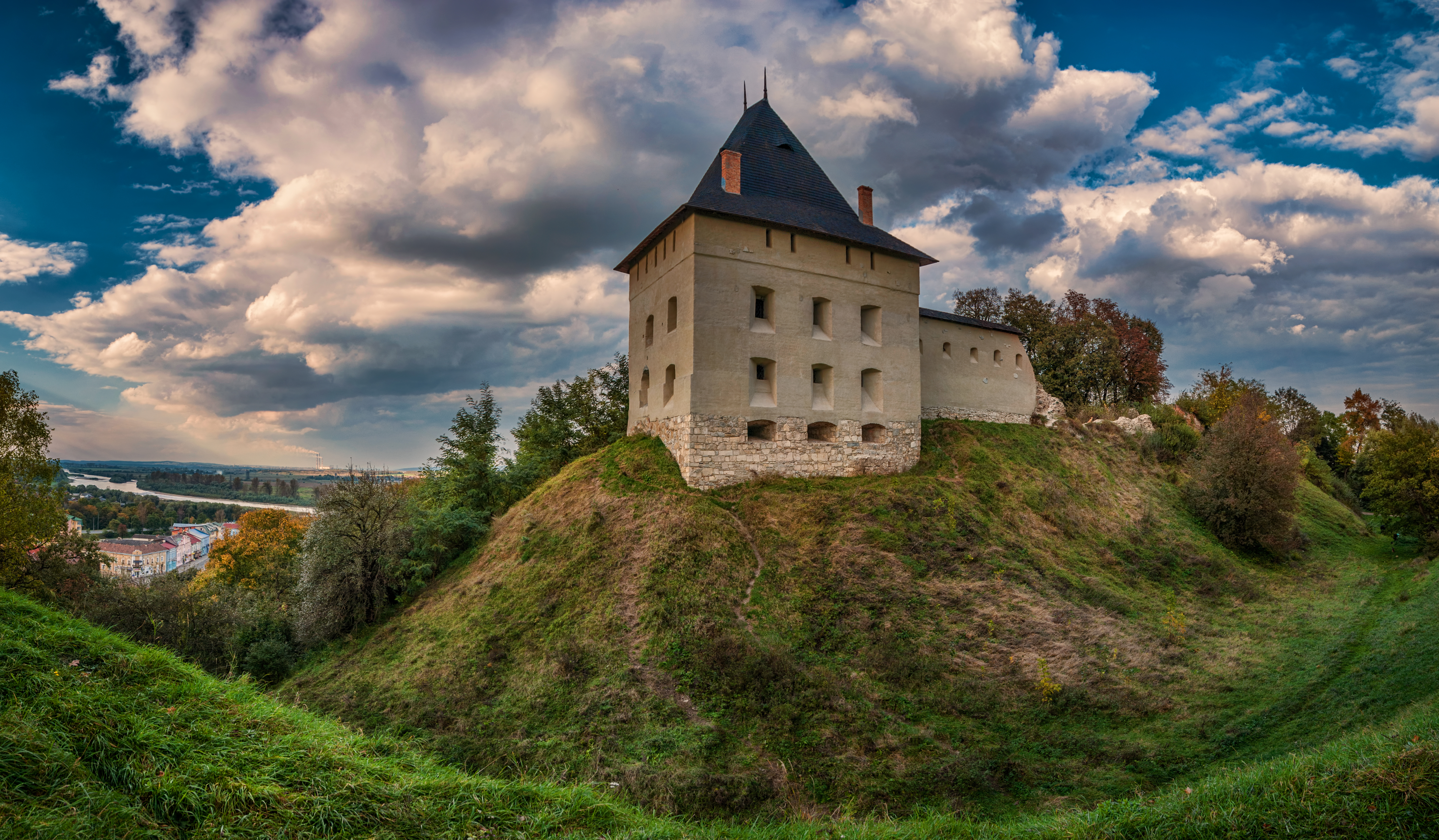
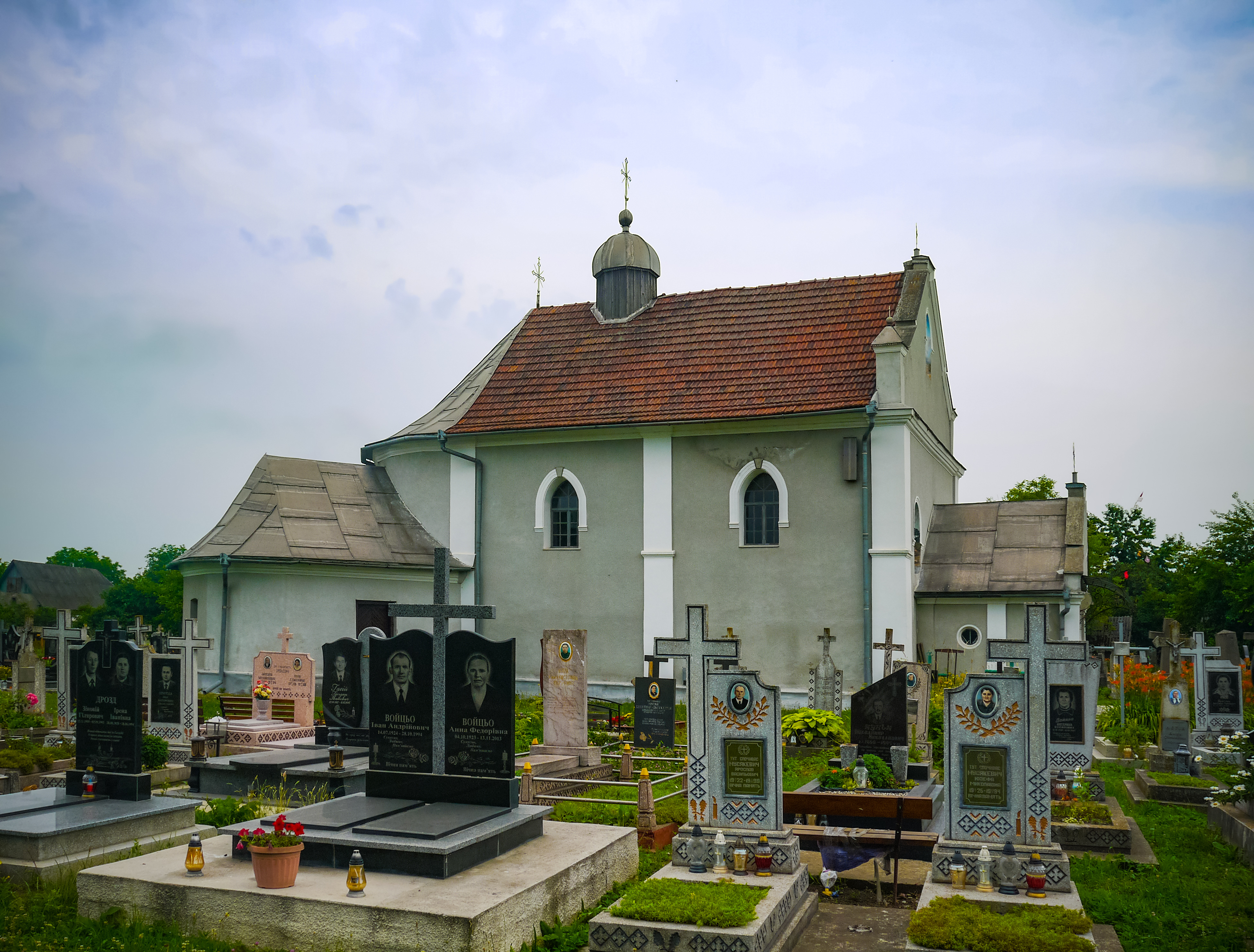
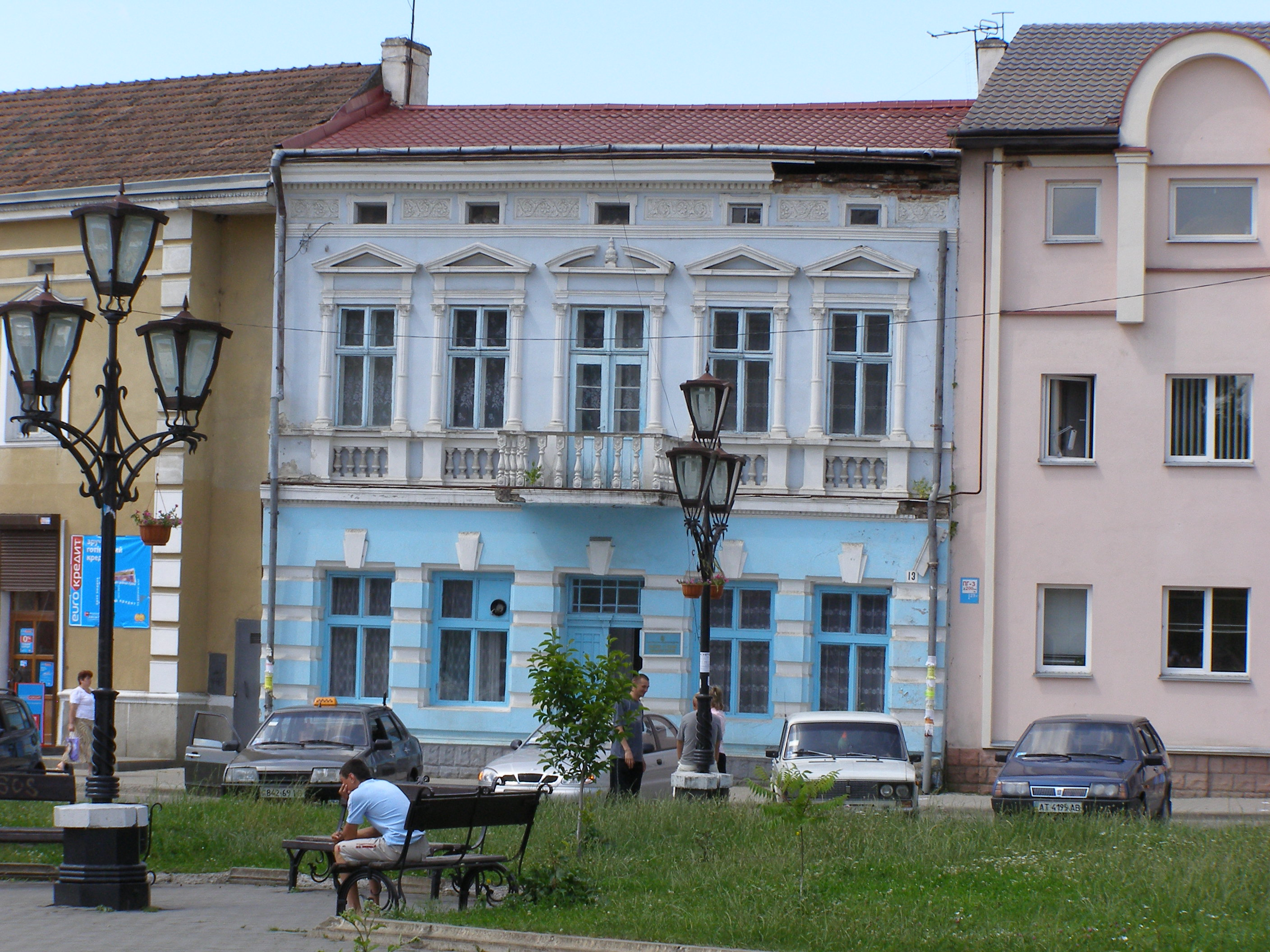
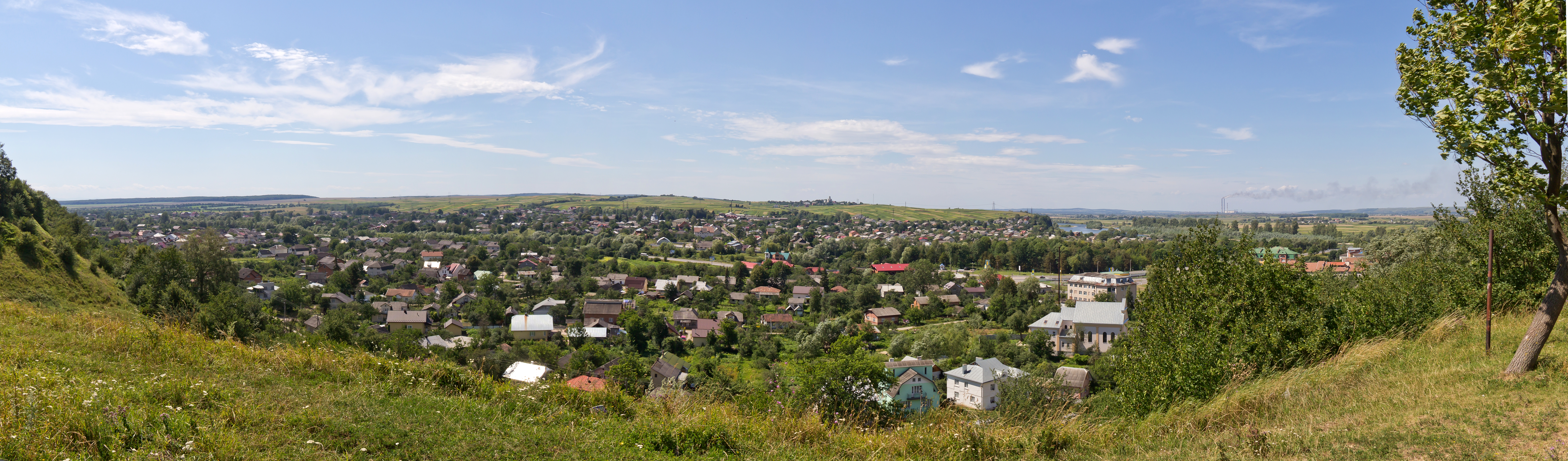
- Halych Castle Church of Saint Demetrius Buildings at Maidan Rizdva Panorama of Halych from Castle Hill

- Flag Coat of arms
- Interactive map of Halych
- Location within Ivano-Frankivsk Oblast Location within Ukraine
- Coordinates: 49°7′29″N 24°43′43″E
- Country: Ukraine
- Oblast: Ivano-Frankivsk Oblast
- Raion: Ivano-Frankivsk Raion
- Hromada: Halych urban hromada

Government
  - Mayor: Orest Trachyk

Population (2022)
  - Total: 6,086
- Website: City's Council; Raion Administration

Halych (Ukrainian: Галич, IPA: [ˈɦɑlɪtʃ]; Romanian: Halici; Polish: Halicz; Russian: Галич, romanized: Galich; German: Halytsch, Halitsch or Galitsch; Yiddish: העליטש, romanized: Heylitsh) is a historic city on the Dniester River in western Ukraine. The city gave its name to the Principality of Halych, the historic province of Galicia (Halychyna), and the Kingdom of Galicia–Volhynia, of which it was the capital until the early 14th century, when the seat of the local rulers moved to Lviv.

Nowadays, Halych is a small town located only on one part of the territory of the former Galician capital, although it has preserved its name. It belongs to Ivano-Frankivsk Raion (district) of Ivano-Frankivsk Oblast (region). It hosts the administration of Halych urban hromada, one of the hromadas of Ukraine. Halych lies 26 km (16 mi) north of the oblast capital, Ivano-Frankivsk. Population: 6,086 (2022 estimate).

== Name ==
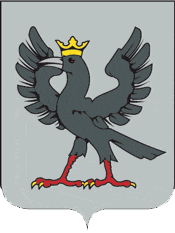
The jackdaw on Galicia's coat-of-arms alludes to the name halka, meaning "jackdaw"

The city's name, though spelled identically in modern East Slavic languages (Галич), is pronounced Halych in Ukrainian and Galich in Russian. The Russian transliteration should not be confused with the Russian town of Galich. In Polish the name is rendered Halicz; in the Yiddish language Helitsh or Heylitsh (העליטש); in Latin, Galic; in Hungarian, Halics; in Romanian, Halici.

Local folk legend would have it that the name "Halych" comes from a legendary "Prince Halychyna", the first ruler of these lands. In fact, a kurgan referred to by locals as "Halychyna's tomb", excavated in 1996, contained a ritual cremation site and a bronze weapon and gold disc that could have belonged to a noble leader. Max Vasmer and modern Slavists generally agree that "Halych" is an adjective derived from the East Slavic word for "jackdaw" ("halka"). This bird featured in the town's old coat of arms.

== History ==
The oldest archaeological artifacts from the territory of Halych are classified to Paleolithic period 40,000 years ago. More systematic findings from a wide number of archaeological cultures dated from 5500 BC, indicate continuous occupation of the region for the past 7,000 years, and suggest the population of Halych increased significantly in the 7th and 8th centuries BC.

Local officials attribute the first written mention of Halych to the year 896 AD. This date is supported by a record found in the Gesta Hungarorum, court chronicles of the Hungarian king Béla III dating from the beginning of the 13th century. The chronicles describe a stay of Hungarian tribes led by Prince Álmos in Halych on their way through Slavic land to Pannonia. The claim is not supported by serious scholars. Similarly, another curious date for the first written mention, 290 AD (with a reference to "Getica" by Goth Jordanes) is not accepted by majority.

=== Old Halych (Princely Halych) ===
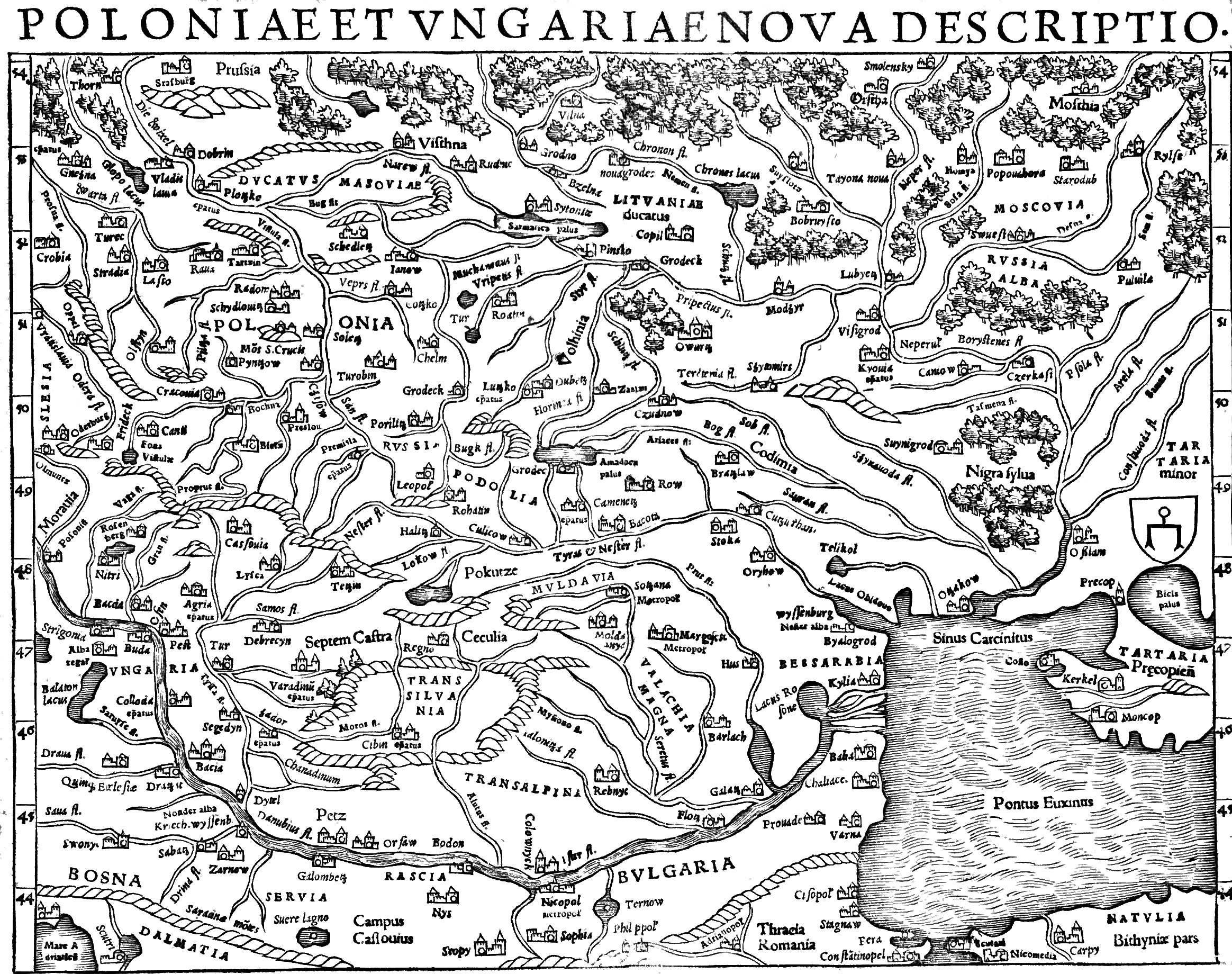
Halitz on Nester on the 1554 map of Sebastian Münster

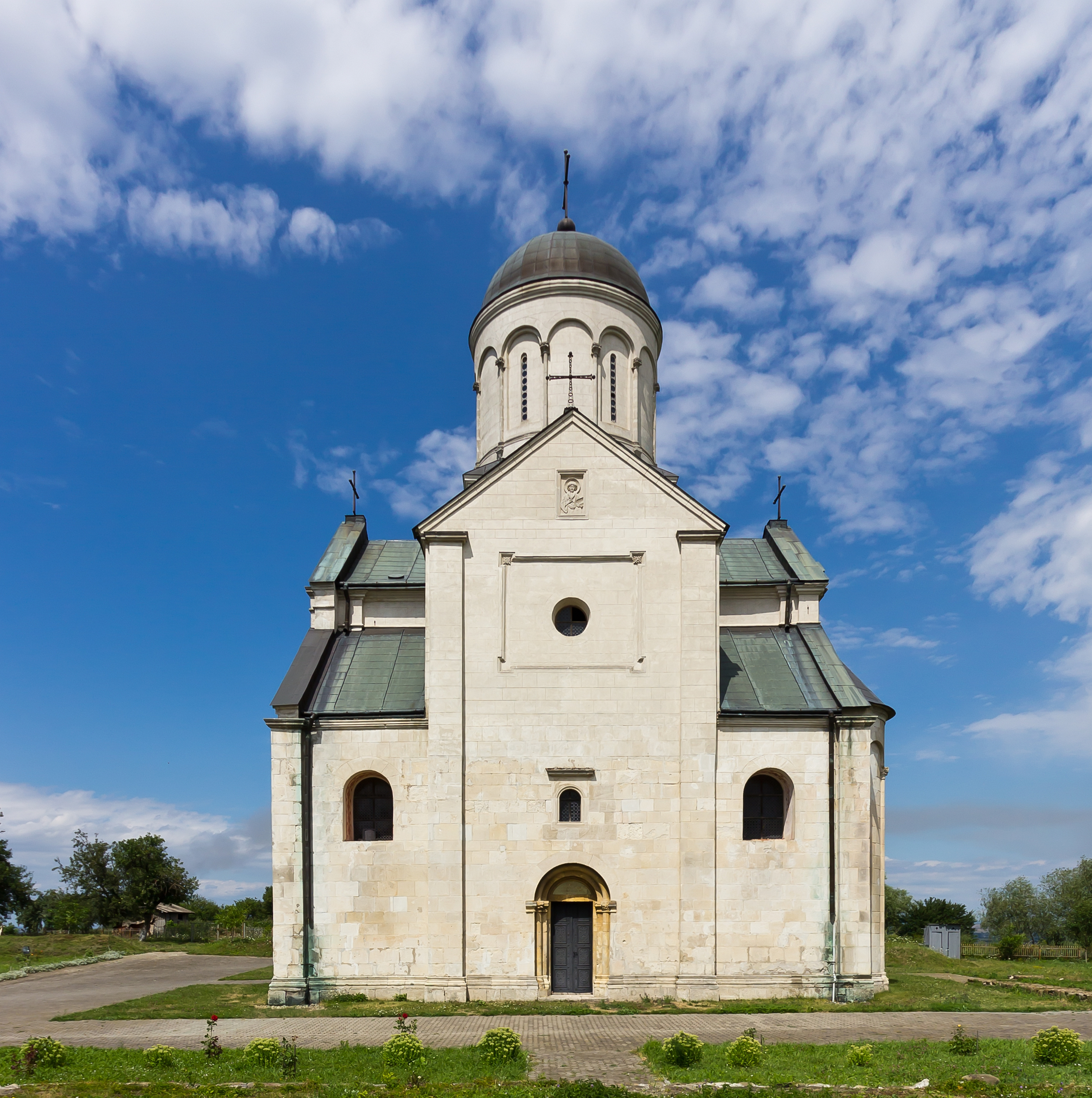
Saint Pantaleon's Church in Shevchenkove

The most comprehensive records about Halych are found in the Hypatian Codex of the Primary Chronicle. The Old Halych is also being referred to as Princely Halych (Ukrainian: Княжий Галич, Knyazhyi Halych) in some Ukrainian sources in order to distinguish it from the contemporary city. Today Old Halych as a settlement of the Old Ruthenia (Rus') is an archaeological monument of Ivano-Frankivsk Oblast. Located in confluence of Dniester and its tributaries, the Old Halych appeared on the basis of several early settlements and trading sites of White Croats, that in 12th–13th centuries merged into a single conurbation. The central part of the human settlement with the Dormition Cathedral and princely chambers, fortified with powerful ramparts and moats, was located over Lukva River (Dniester's tributary) at the place of contemporary village of Krylos.

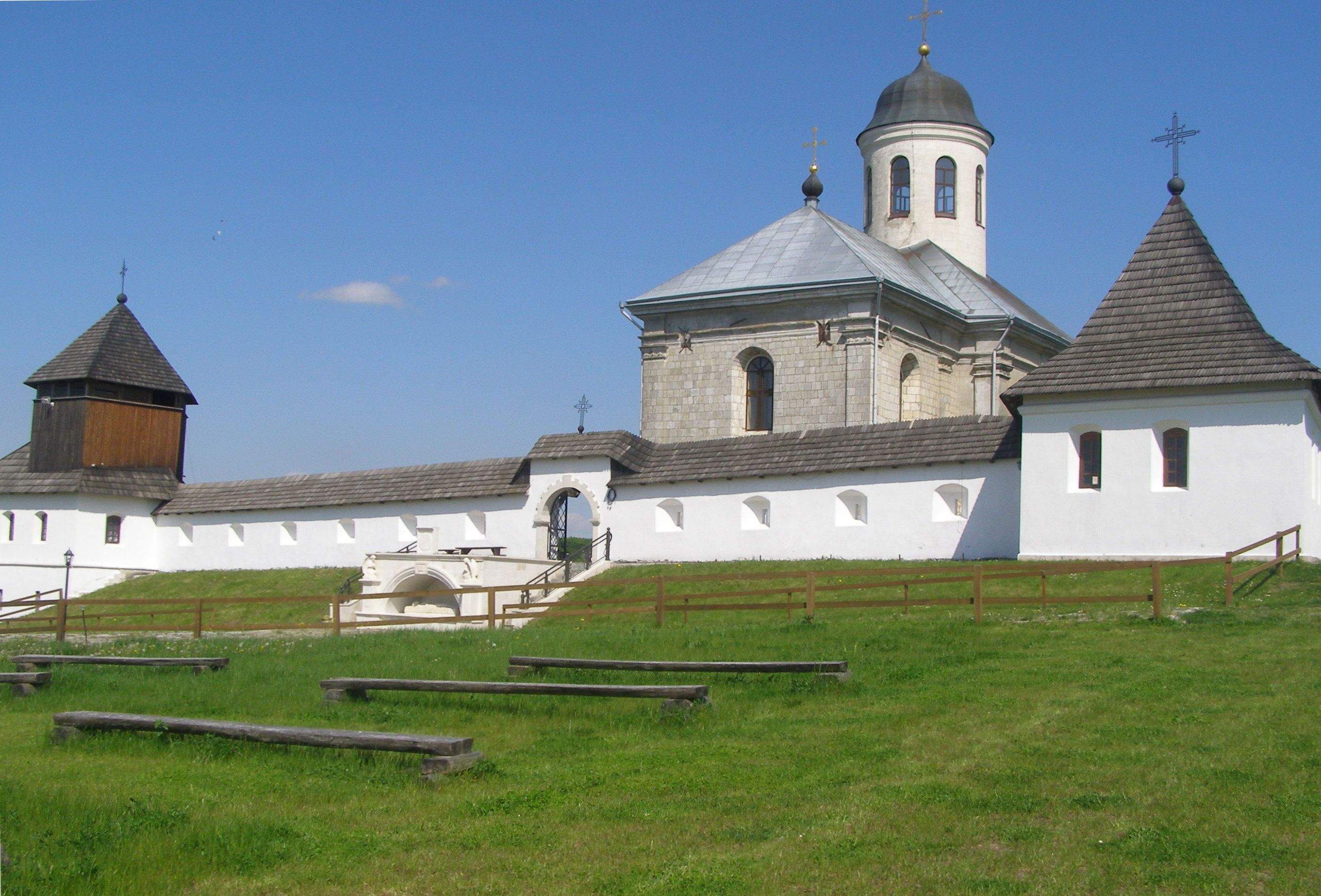
Dormition Church with the restored medieval city walls

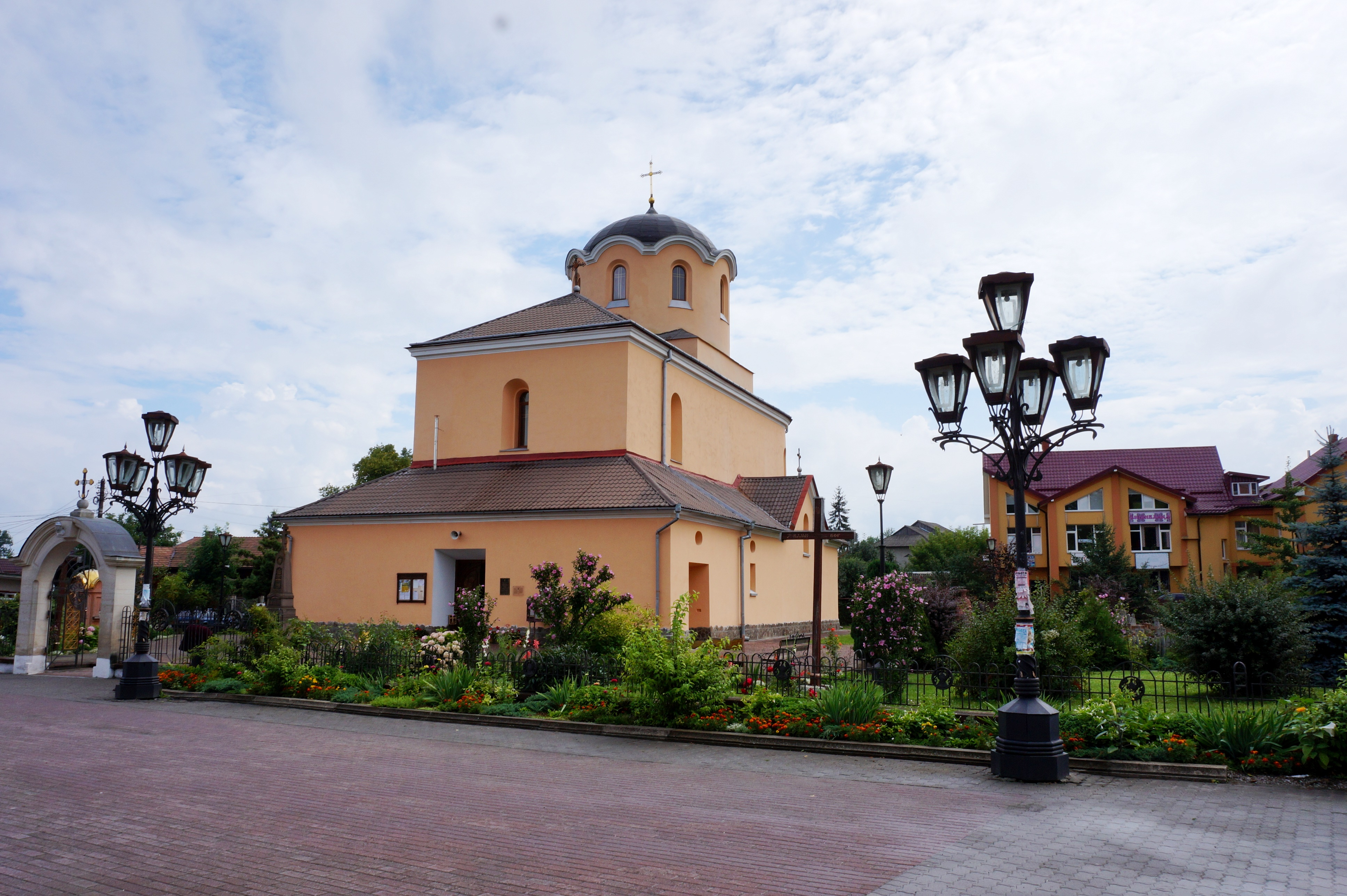
Nativity Church (14th–15th century)

Old Austrian postcard with a view of Halych

The first dynasty of Halych, descending from Vladimir of Novgorod, a Rurik family branch known as Rostislavichi, culminated in Yaroslav Osmomysl (1153–1187) – after whose rule Béla III of Hungary briefly conquered the Principality in 1188 – before going extinct in 1199. The same year Roman the Great founded the new Rurikid dynasty, uniting Galicia and Volhynia into the more powerful principality of Halych-Volhynia. In 1141 Prince (knyaz) Volodymyrko Volodarovych (1104–1152) who united the competing principalities of Peremyshl, Zvenyhorod and Terebovlia into the Principality of Galicia transferred his capital from Zvenyhorod to Halych making it the seat of his Rurikid dynasty and considerably expanding the settlement.

The Mongols under Batu Khan took the capital in 1241, when the famous King Danylo was its ruler. Thereafter the town steadily declined, eventually ceding supremacy to the newly founded Lviv. The excavations of 1933–42 (Yaroslav Pasternak), 1951–52 (Karger M.K., Aulikh V.), and 1955 uncovered remains of houses, workshops, fortifications, and ten churches built of white stone. Pasternak's excavations established that ancient Halych originated on the spot of today's village Krylos (located 5 km south of modern Halych) as early as the 10th century. In 1936 Pasternak also discovered remains of an 11th to 12th century three-apse cathedral with burial tomb of Prince Yaroslav Osmomysl in it. The cathedral is ascribed to the Cathedral of the Dormition previously known only from Chronicles, known to have been a sepulchre of the earliest Halychian princes. The sheer size (37,5 by 32,4 m) of the cathedral (the second largest mediaeval church on the territory of present-day Ukraine, smaller only to Saint Sophia Cathedral in Kyiv), suggests that ancient Halych was the seat of a diocese. Most likely the cathedral was built in 1157 and destroyed in 1241 by hordes of Batu Khan, then rebuilt again and last time mentioned in 1576.

It is believed that the early Galician architectural style, thoroughly permeated with Romanesque influences from the West, had been transferred further north-east. The builders of temples in Halych are believed to have also been responsible for the extant Pereslavl Cathedral and Church of Intercession upon Nerl. The foundations of the Dormition Cathedral (1157) are still to be seen. The only surviving medieval monument belonging to this style is the Church of Saint Pantaleon, originally constructed at the turn of the 12th and 13th centuries, but significantly rebuilt in the 17th century and controversially reconstructed in the 1990s. The archaeological excavations (1989–2005 under direction of Yuri Lukomsky) at the terrains of Krylos and Halych continue.

=== Halych ===
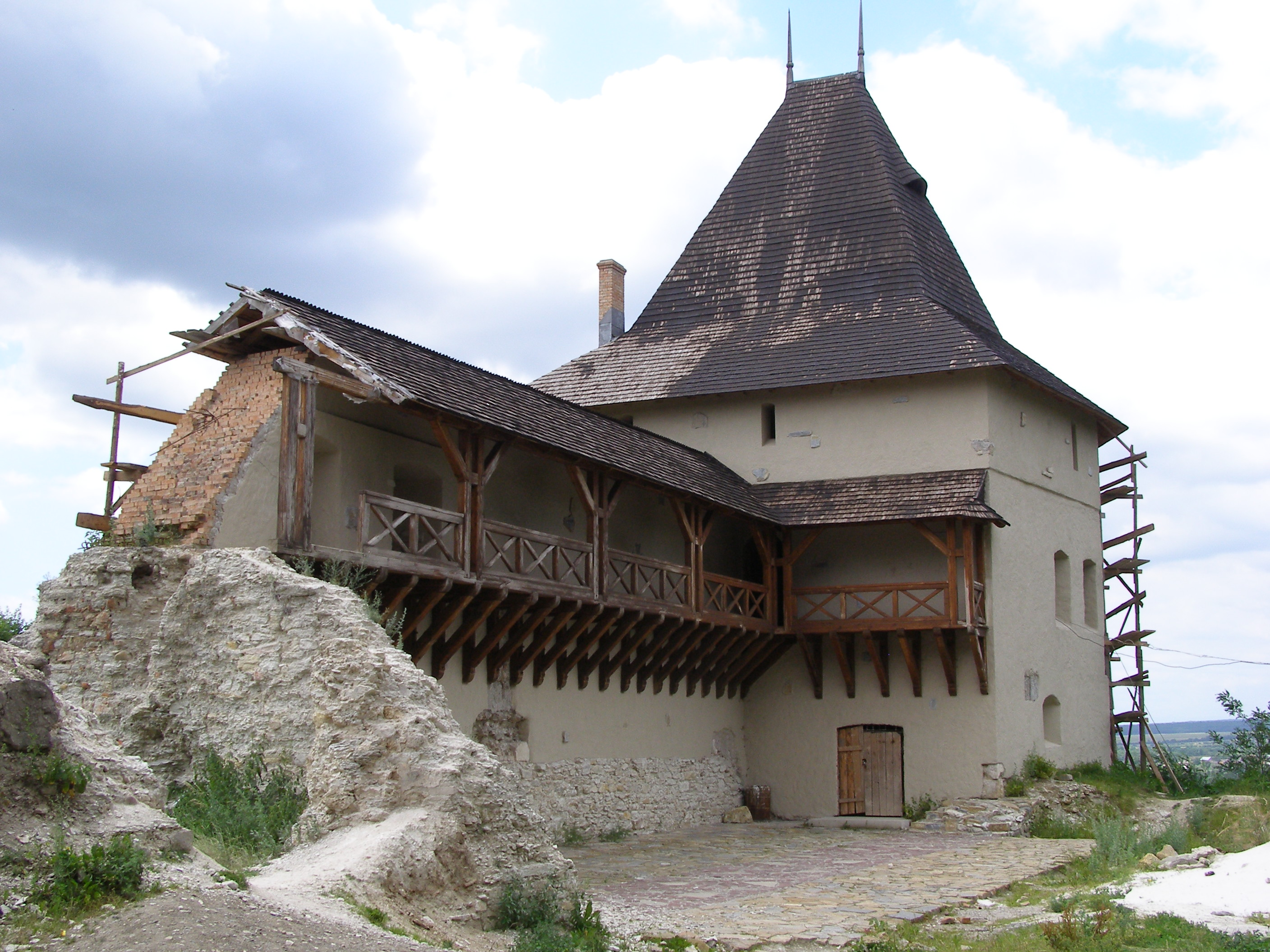
Ruins of the castle from the 14th century.

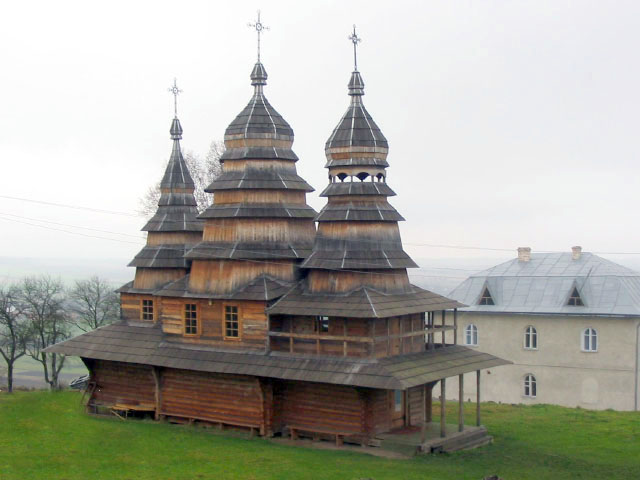
This 16th-century wooden church from Krylos exemplifies traditional wooden architecture of Galicia.

Gradually, old Halych depopulated to the point that its only mid-14th-century inhabitants were the Metropolitan of Halych and his staff. The present-day town is situated about 5 kilometres (3 miles) away from the ancient capital of Halychyna, on the spot where the old town's riverport used to be located and where prince Lubart of Lithuania constructed his wooden castle in 1367.

Its main historical monument is the church dedicated to the Nativity of Mary. Originally built at the turn of the 14th and 15th century, it was restored in 1825. Also of interest is an equestrian monument to Danylo of Halych, opened in 2003 to mark the 750th anniversary of that prince's coronation as the king of Ruthenia.

In 1349, following the death of Duke Bolesław Jerzy II of Mazovia and the Galicia–Volhynia Wars, Halych was annexed by Polish King Casimir III the Great. In 1367, it was granted Magdeburg rights, and in the same year, a Roman Catholic Diocese was established here. Five years later, Pope Gregory XI created in Avignon the Archdiocese of Halicz, which controlled the Dioceses of Kholm (Chełm), Peremyshl (Przemyśl) and Volodymyr-Volynskyi (Włodzimierz Wołyński). In 1409, the Archdiocese was moved to Lviv.

After King Casimir's death (1370), Louis I, King of Poland and Hungary subjected Red Ruthenia to the authority of Hungarian-appointed starostas, overlooked by Duke Vladislaus II of Opole, Palatine of Hungary. Hungarians remained in Halich until 1387, when Queen Jadwiga of Poland removed them and re-annexed the area into Poland. In the Kingdom of Poland, Halich remained one of main administrative centers of the Ruthenian Voivodeship. In 1564, the Sejm in Warsaw created a sejmik in Halicz, which ruled over the Ziemia of Halicz, including the powiats of Halicz, Trembowla and Kolomyja.

During the Polish–Ottoman War (1620–21), Halicz was burned by Crimean Tatars (1621), and in 1624, Hetman Stanisław Koniecpolski defeated the Tatars at Martynów, near Halicz. In 1649, Halicz was once again destroyed by Cossacks of Bohdan Khmelnytsky, further destruction took place in 1676, during the Polish–Ottoman War (1672–76). In 1765, Halicz had 110 houses and 3 churches, and Franciszek Ksawery Potocki serving as local starosta. The town was seized by Austrian troops in 1772, and remained part of the Habsburg Empire until late 1918.

In 1870, the population of Halicz was 4142, including 1609 Roman Catholics, 1690 Greek-Catholics, and 839 Jews. On November 1, 1918, until May 1919, the town was administered by Ukrainians. Following the Polish–Ukrainian War, Halicz temporarily returned to Poland, which was confirmed in Paris on June 25, 1919. On September 16, 1920, during the Polish–Soviet War, the Battle of Dytiatyn took place near Halicz, and on March 15, 1923, the Conference of Ambassadors recognized permanent Polish control over eastern part of former Galicia. Until the Soviet invasion of Poland, Halicz belonged to Stanisławów Voivodeship, in which it was the seat of a county.

In the beginning of July 1941, the town was occupied by Germans. The Jewish community was large. Most of the Jews lived in the town center on the right bank of the Dniester River. In the fall of 1941 or 1942, 1,000 Jews were murdered in a mass execution. Some 20–30 Jews were drowned in the river.

After World War II, its Polish residents were resettled to the so-called Recovered Territories.

On 8 February 1994, Ancient Halych preserve has been created to preserve and promote the architectural sites in Halych of 11th–17th centuries.

Until 18 July 2020, Halych was the administrative center of Halych Raion. The raion was abolished in July 2020 as part of the administrative reform of Ukraine, which reduced the number of raions of Ivano-Frankivsk Oblast to six. The area of Halych Raion was merged into Ivano-Frankivsk Raion.

== Main sights ==
- Halychyna's tomb – the burial of legendary ruler Halychyna. Reconstruction in kurgan. In Krylos.
- Church of the Dormition (Built in 1584). In Krylos.
- Remains of Cathedral of the Dormition and St. Basil chapel. In Krylos.
- Reconstruction of 16th Century wooden church typical of Halychyna. In Krylos
- Prince's well. In Krylos.
- Residence of Mitropolit (Now museum of History of Halych). In Krylos.
- St. Pantaleon Church. The only surviving 12 c. church from Halych-Volhynia.
- Castle (13th–17th centuries). In Halych. Built by Casimir III the Great in the mid-14th century, and remodelled by architect Francisco Corazzini in the early 17th century. Captured by Turks in 1676, it was left in ruins, and most of its walls were dismantled by Austrians in 1796,
- Church of The Nativity (14th century). In Halych.

== Notable residents ==
- Ivan Popel (1850–1921), Ukrainian Greek Catholic priest, social and cultural activist
