= Dormition Cathedral, Halych =

Former church in Ivano-Frankivsk Oblast, Ukraine

Dormition Cathedral
- Успенський собор
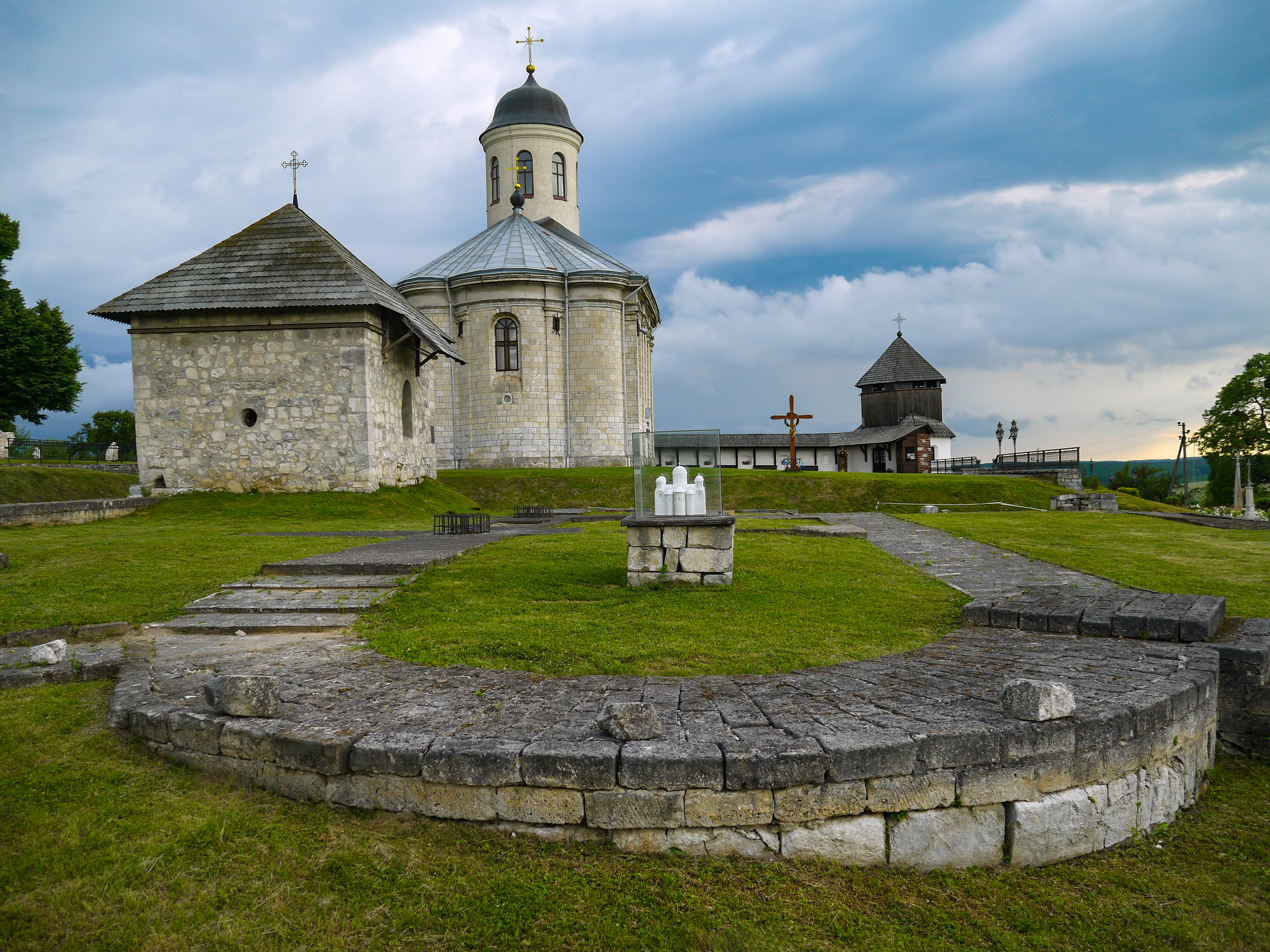
- Foundations and a miniature model of the cathedral
- Dormition Cathedral
- 49°5′7.8″N 24°41′52.9″E
- Location: Krylos, Ivano-Frankivsk Oblast
- Country: Ukraine
- Previous denomination: Metropolis of Kiev and all Rus', Metropolis of Halych

History
- Status: Destroyed
- Dedication: Dormition of the Mother of God

Architecture
- Style: Galician school
- Completed: 12th century
- Demolished: 16th century

Immovable Monument of National Significance of Ukraine
- Official name: Фундаменти собору Успіння Пресвятої Богородиці (Foundations of the Cathedral of the Dormition of the Mother of God)
- Type: Architecture, archaeology, history
- Reference no.: 090021/1-Н

The Dormition Cathedral (Ukrainian: Успенський собор) was the main cathedral of Princely Halych (located within modern-day Krylos, Ukraine). Built in the 12th century under the Kievan Rus', the Galician-style cathedral was damaged by the Mongol invasion in the 13th century and was entirely destroyed in the 16th century. Its foundations were excavated in the 1930s and are now managed by the Ancient Halych Reserve.

== History ==
The construction of the Dormition Cathedral started in the 1140s under the Galician prince Volodymyrko Volodarovych and was completed under Yaroslav Osmomysl. The Dormition Cathedral became the center of the Eparchy of Halych, which was established in 1156. The first written mention of the church dates to 1187, when the burial of Osmomysl in the building took place. According to the Galician–Volhynian Chronicle, the church was fortified by Coloman of Galicia before it was captured by Mstislav in 1219. The same source describes a certain Prince Iziaslav taking refuge in the cathedral during an attack by Roman Danylovich in 1254, an event that is more likely to have happened in the 1230s during Iziaslav IV of Kiev's war against Galicia. The Dormition Cathedral was damaged but not destroyed in the 13th-century Mongol invasion. In the 14th century, the seat of the Metropolis of Halych was located in the Dormition Cathedral.

The exact date of the cathedral's destruction is unknown. A "big church" in Krylos is mentioned in a 1548 letter from the Lviv bishop Makarii, which may suggest that the building still existed in the early 16th century. St. Basil's Chapel was constructed on the southwestern corner of the former cathedral some time between the 15th and the 17th centuries, and a smaller Dormition Church was built nearby around the late 16th century. The ruins of the old cathedral were used as material for the construction of both buildings.

The location of the Dormition Cathedral was forgotten by the 19th century. On 25 July 1936, its foundations were discovered by archaeologist Yaroslav Pasternak. They were excavated in the following years. In 1937, a stone sarcophagus was found, where Yaroslav Osmomysl may have been buried. Further excavations and conservation works were conducted in the 1970s.

The local government approved the cathedral's reconstruction in 1996 to celebrate the 1100th anniversary of Halych. Construction work started in 1999, damaging a part of the foundation, but halted the same year. Currently, the cathedral's foundations, together with St. Basil's Chapel and the Dormition Church, belong to the Ancient Halych Architectural and Historic Reserve. The foundations were listed as an architectural, archaeological, and historic monument of national significance on 19 October 2012.

== Architecture ==
Though originally envisaged as a basilica under Volodymyrko Volodarovych's rule, the cathedral was constructed with a cross-in-square plan. The Dormition Cathedral was the second-largest church of the Kievan Rus' after the Saint Sophia Cathedral in Kyiv, covering an area of 37.5 by 32.4 m. The building had three naves, three apses, and four columns. Its interior was decorated with frescoes while its façade was covered in stone carvings. A bas-relief depicting a dragon that originates from the Dormition Cathedral survives inside the 16th-century Dormition Church. Some researchers have suggested that the cathedral was connected to the Princely Castle in a fashion similar to the Bogolyubovo Castle in modern-day Russia. The Dormition Cathedral in Vladimir was modelled after the Halych cathedral.

== Gallery ==
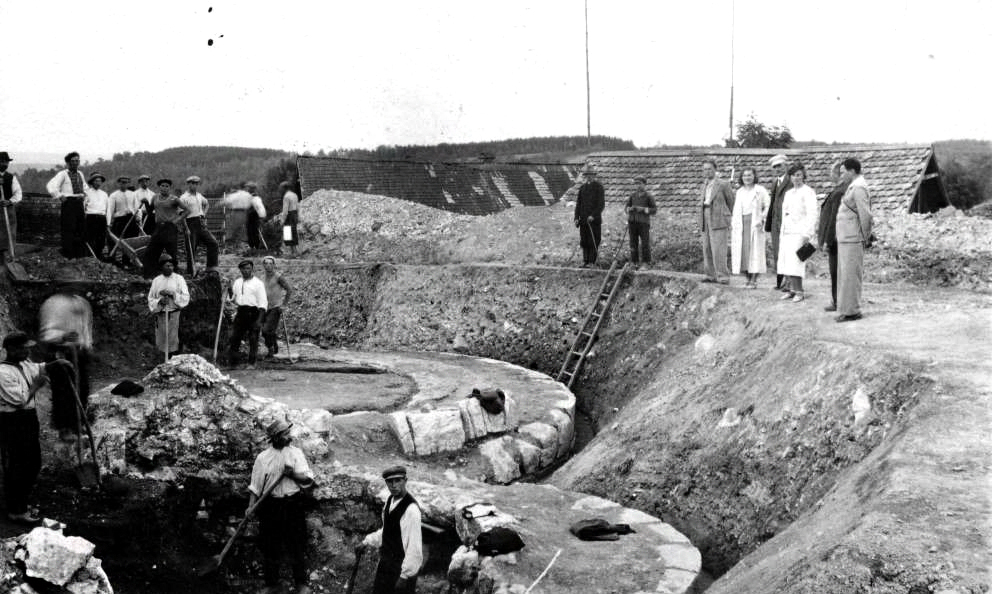
Excavations of the cathedral's remains in 1936

Stone sarcophagus

Plan of the cathedral by Yaroslav Pasternak

Modern view of the southwestern corner, with St. Basil's Chapel on top of the cathedral remains

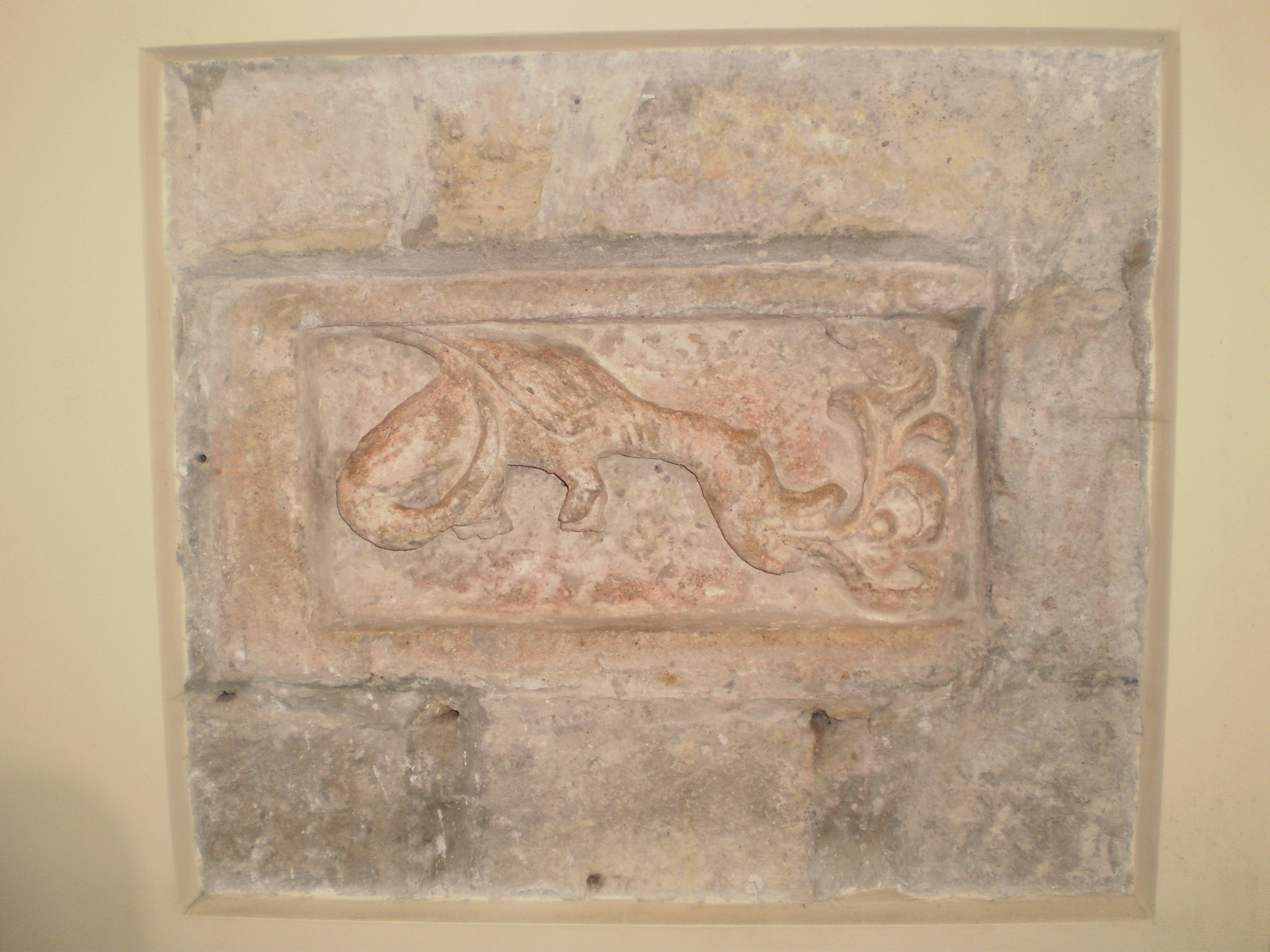
Dragon relief that formerly adorned the cathedral's façade

== See also ==
- St. Pantaleon Church, Shevchenkove
