= Ancient Halych =

National Architecture-Historical Reserve in Ivano-Frankivsk Oblast, Ukraine

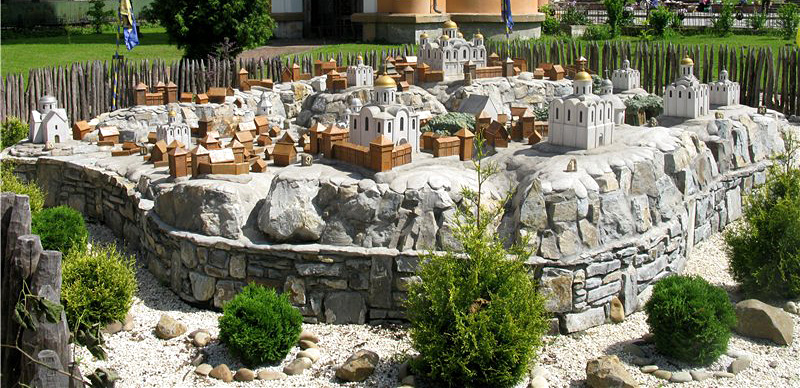
Model of ancient Halych

Ancient Halych (Ukrainian: Національний заповідник «Давній Галич», romanized: "Davnii Halych") is the National Architecture-Historical Reserve located in the western Ukrainian settlements of Halych, Krylos, Shevchenkove, Bilshivtsi, and Zalukva. The site includes landmarks of 11th–17th centuries in ancient Halych and its surroundings. The reserve was created on 8 February 1994.

== Architectural landmarks ==
Halych is one of the few Ukrainian cities where Kievan Rus'-era architecture has been partially preserved, similarly to Kyiv and Chernihiv. The reserve consists of more than 200 architectural monuments. The major monuments of architecture, as well as museums that belong to the reserve, are listed below.

Halych

- Church of Nativity of Christ (14th–17th centuries)
- Halych castle (14th–17th centuries)
- Museum of Karaite History and Culture, including ten Karaite houses (20th century) and cemetery in Zalukva village

Krylos

- Remains of ancient Halych (11th–13th centuries)
- Foundation of Dormition Cathedral (12th century), as well as the grave of Yaroslav Osmomysl (12th century) and St. Basil's Chapel (15th century)
- Foundation of St. Elijah's Church (12th century)
- Knyaz's well (12th century)
- Church of the Dormition of Blessed Virgin Mary (16th century)
- Halychyna Grave
- Foundation of St. Cyril's Church (12th–13th centuries)
- A system of ramparts and fortifications
- Museum of History of Ancient Halych
- Museum of Folk Architecture and Life in the Carpathian Region

Shevchenkove

- St. Pantaleon Church (12th century)

Bilshivtsi

- Carmelite Cathedral and Monastery Complex (17th century)

=== Preservation ===
Restoration works were carried out in ancient Halych in the period of 1995–2002. On 9 August 2023, the reserve decided to create a team that will work towards inscribing ancient Halych on the tentative World Heritage Sites list. In September 2023, the Association of Cities of Ukraine requested Ukrainian government to start the process of inscription of the settlement of Princely Halych in Krylos and St. Pantaleon's Church to the UNESCO tentative list.

== Gallery ==
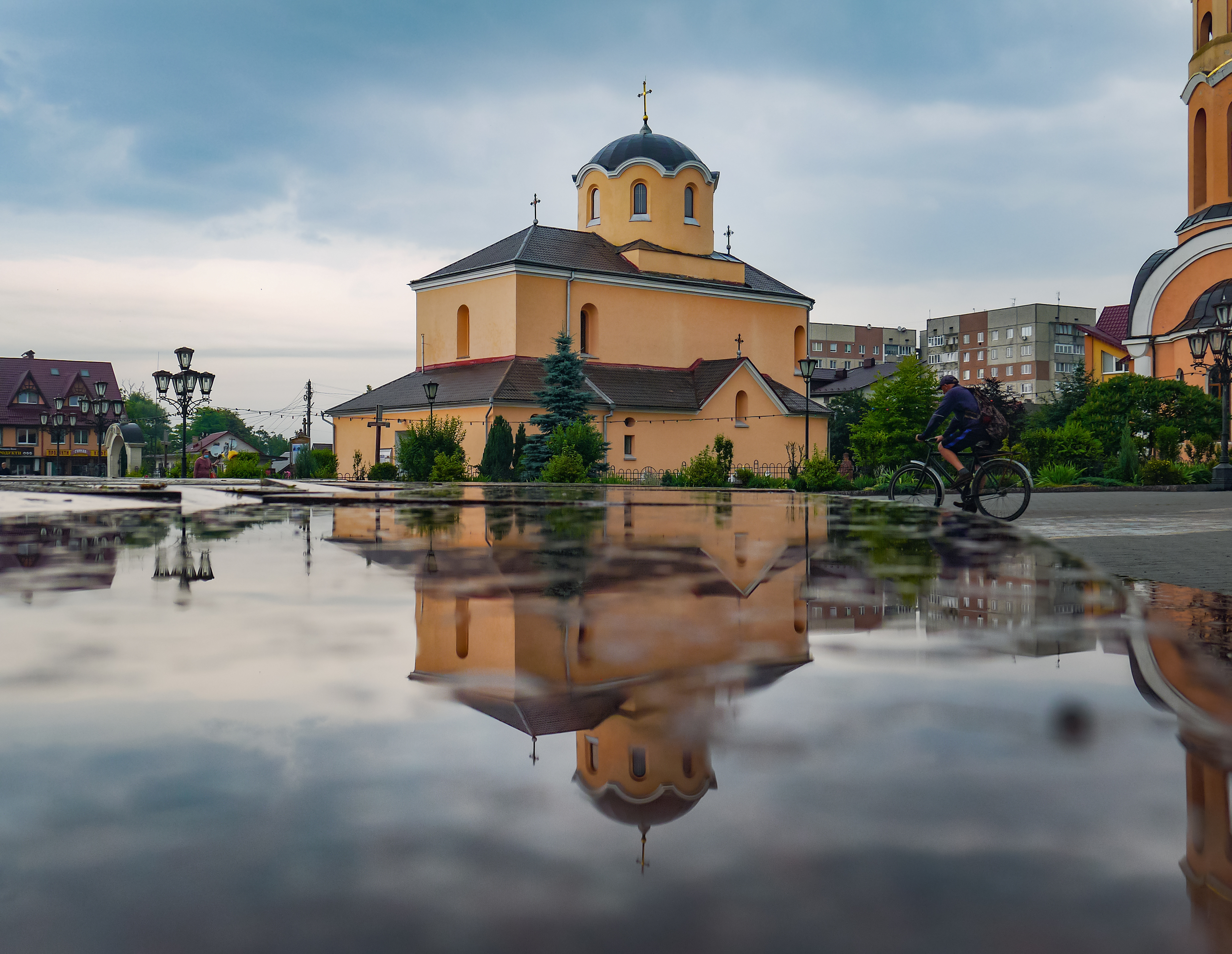
Church of Nativity of Christ in Halych

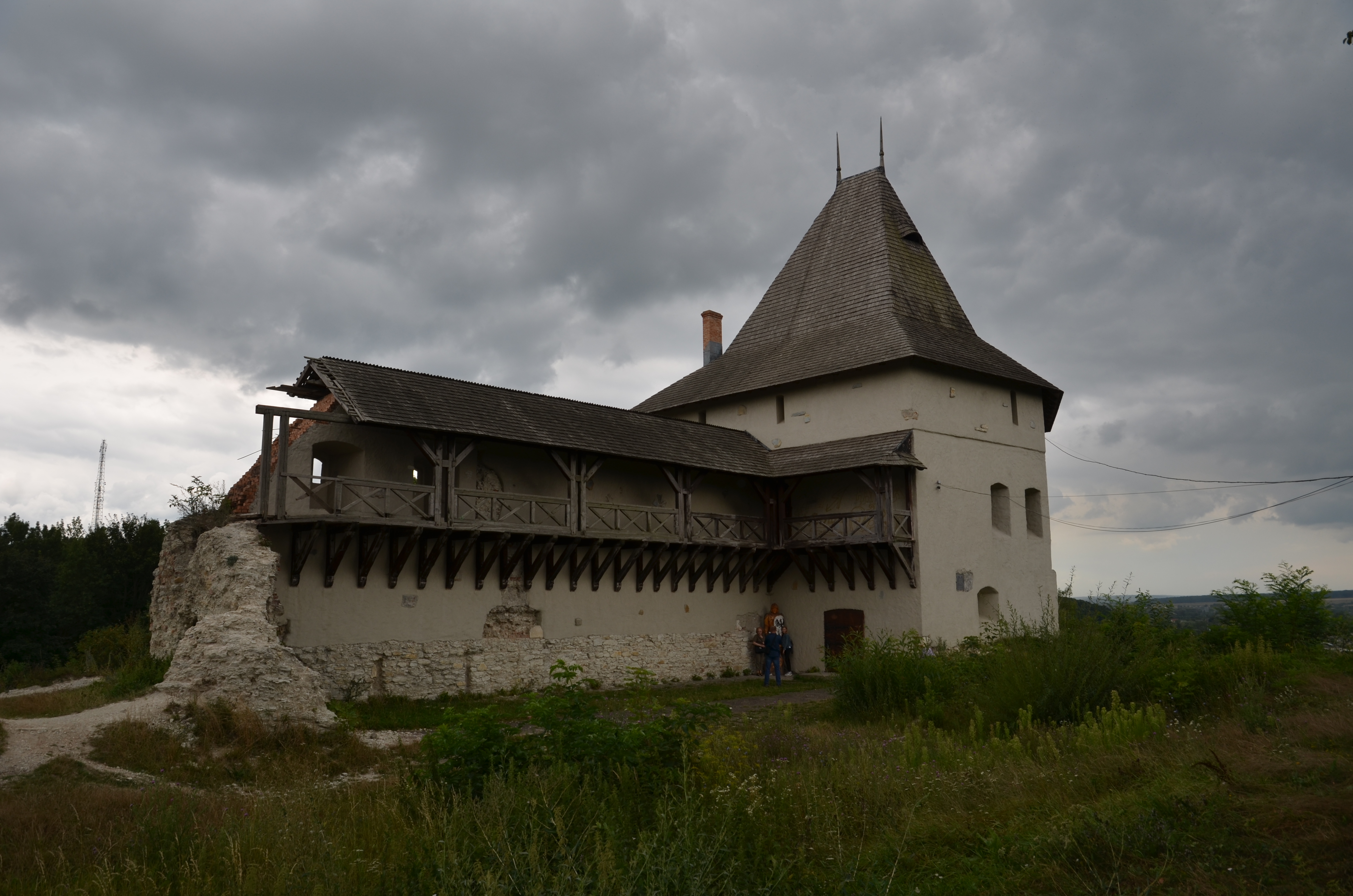
Halych Castle

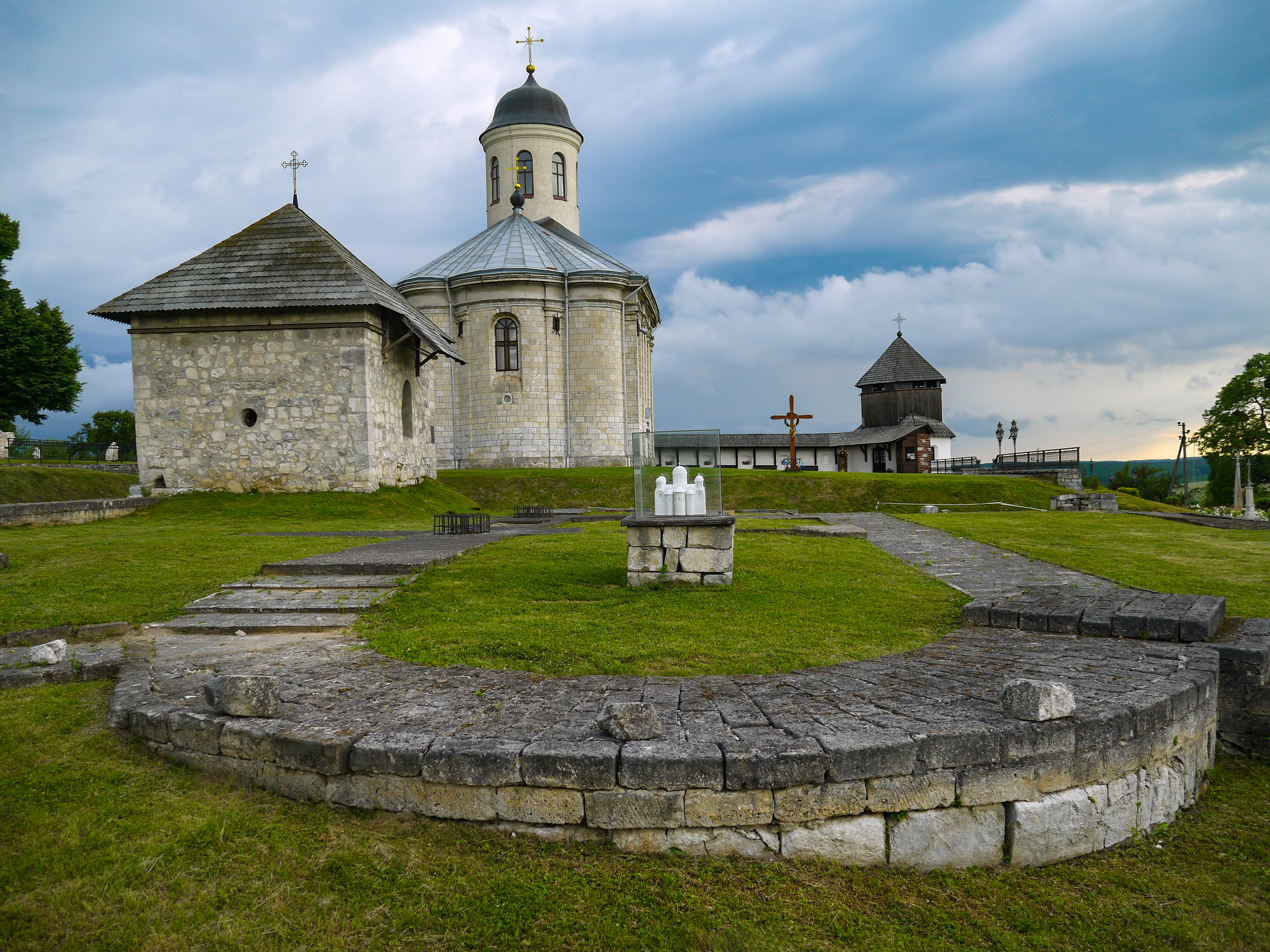
Foundation of Dormition Cathedral (foreground) and Church of Dormition of Blessed Virgin Mary (background)

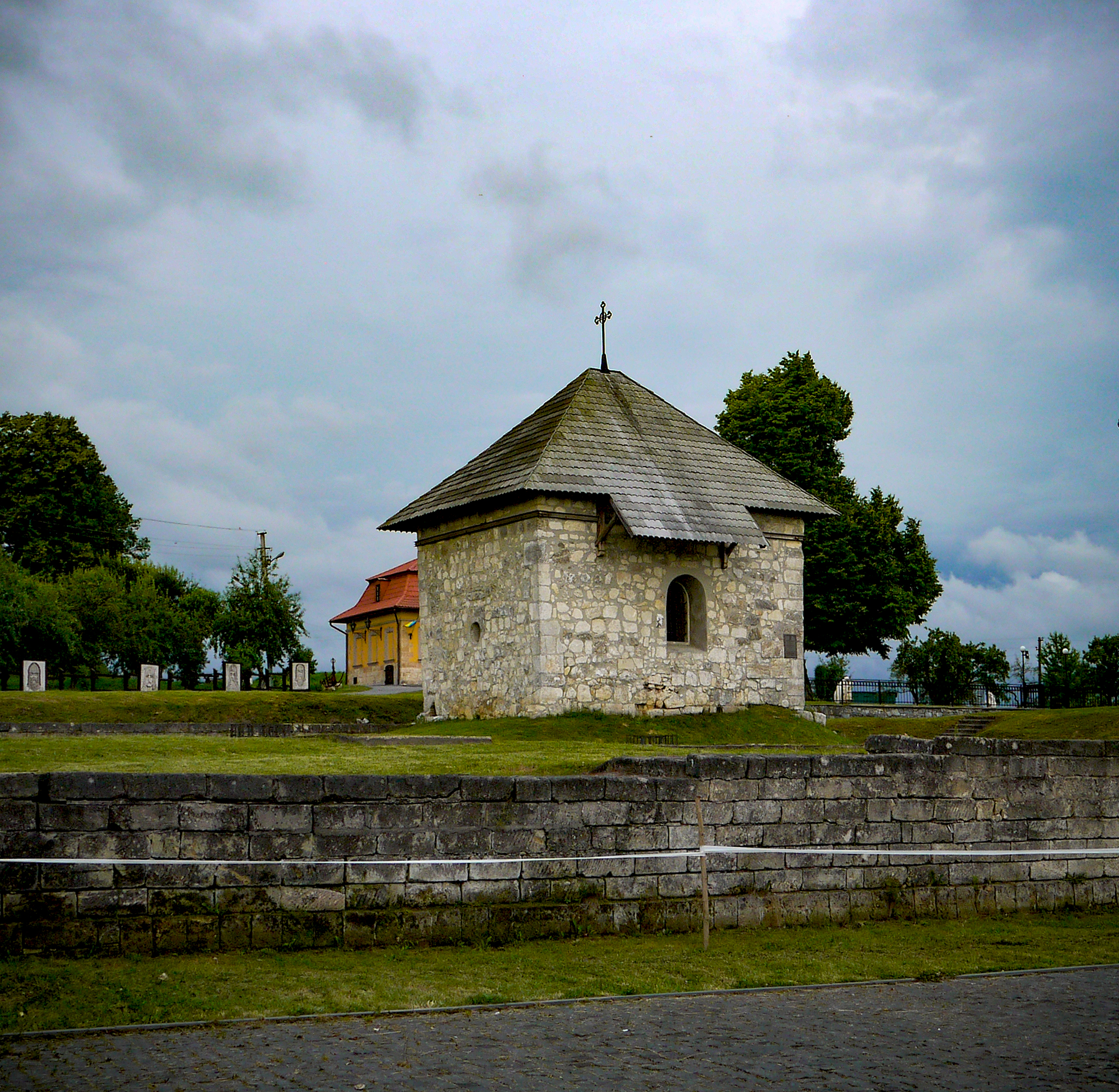
St. Basil's Chapel

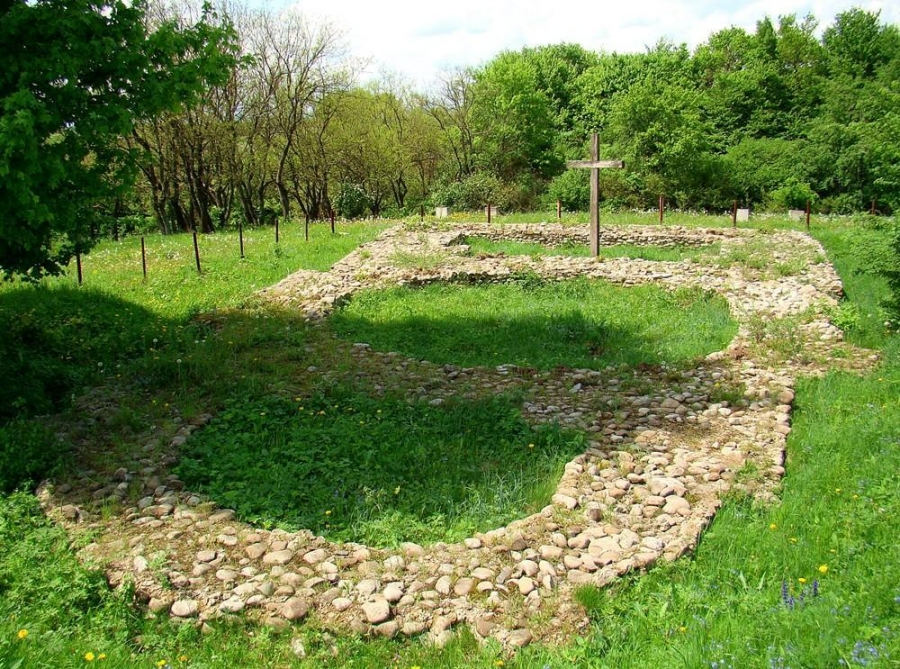
Foundation of St. Elijah's Church

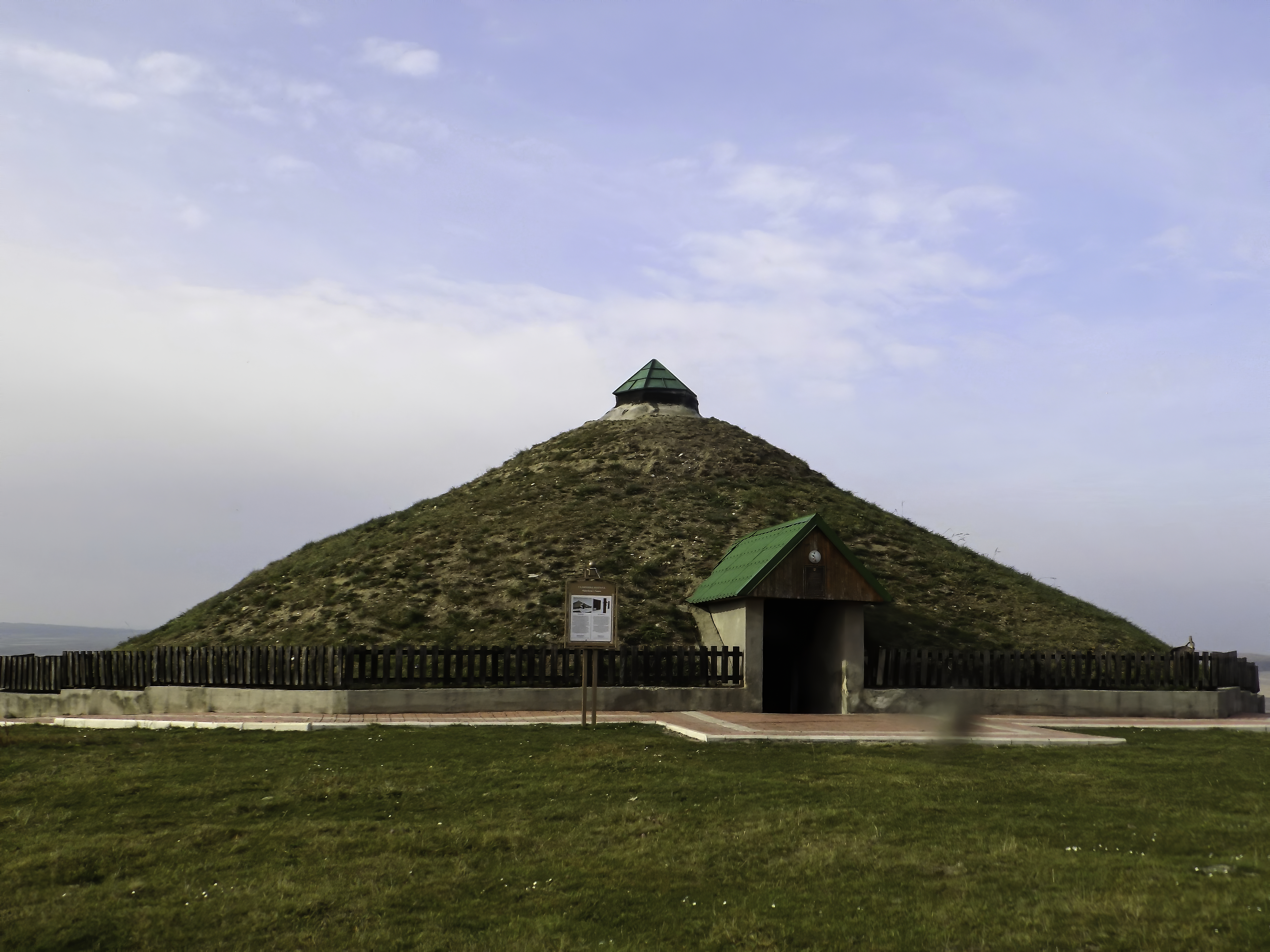
Halychyna Grave

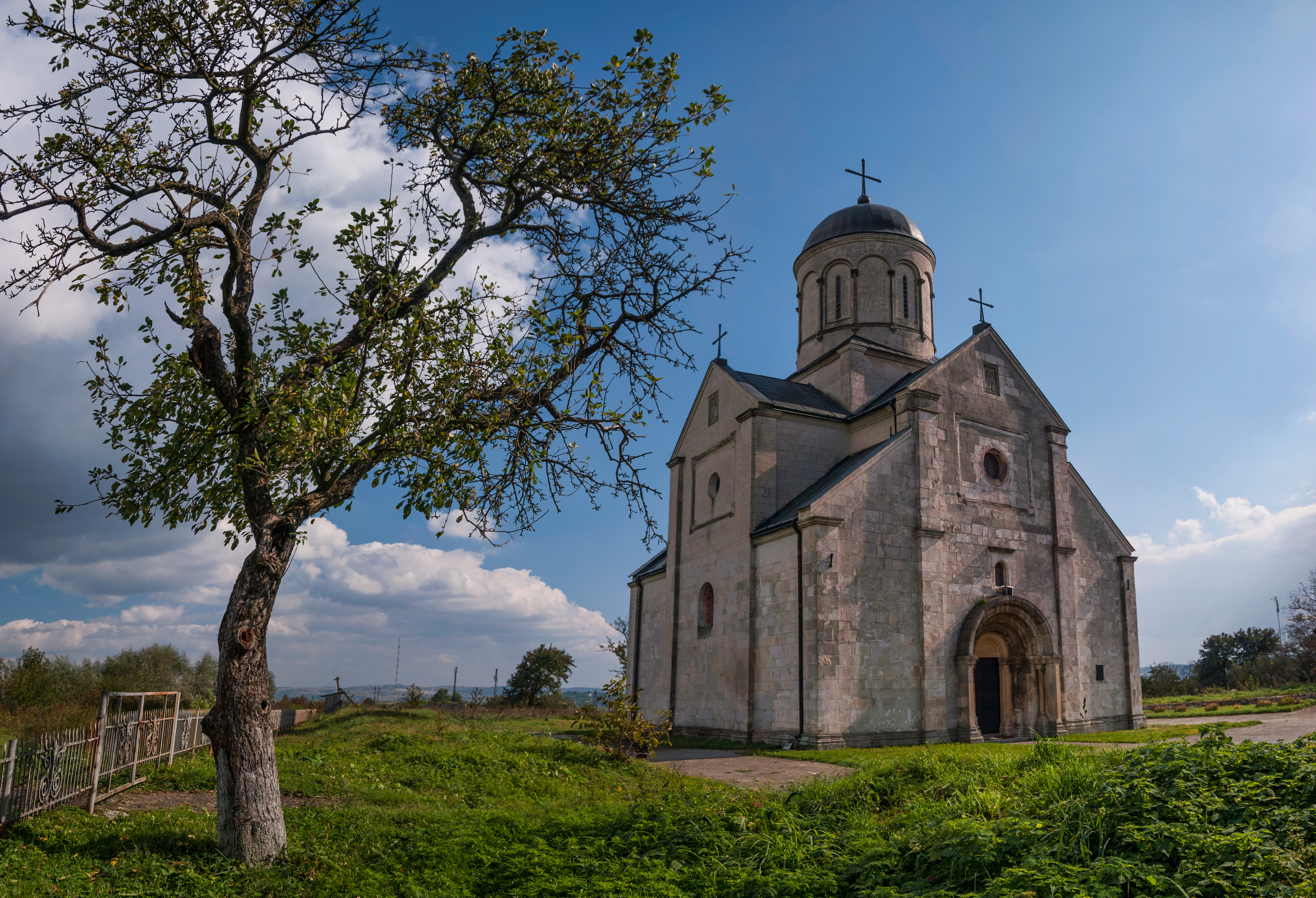
St. Pantaleon's Church

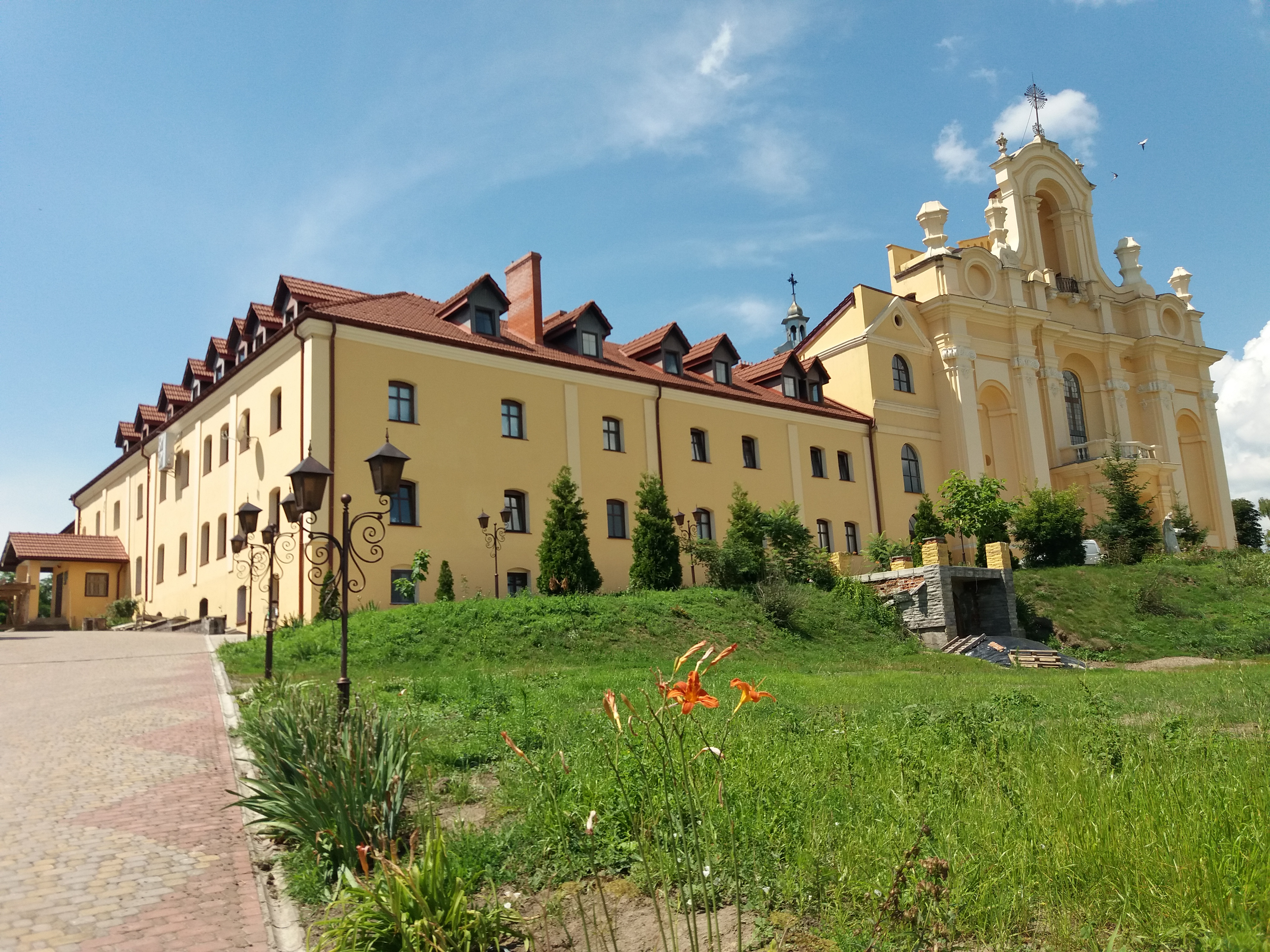
Carmelite Cathedral

== See also ==
- List of historic reserves in Ukraine
- Ancient Chernihiv
- Ancient Kyiv
- Taras Tkachuk
