= Halych Castle =

Defensive structure in Halych, Ivano-Frankivsk Oblast, Ukraine

- Halych, Ivano-Frankivsk Oblast
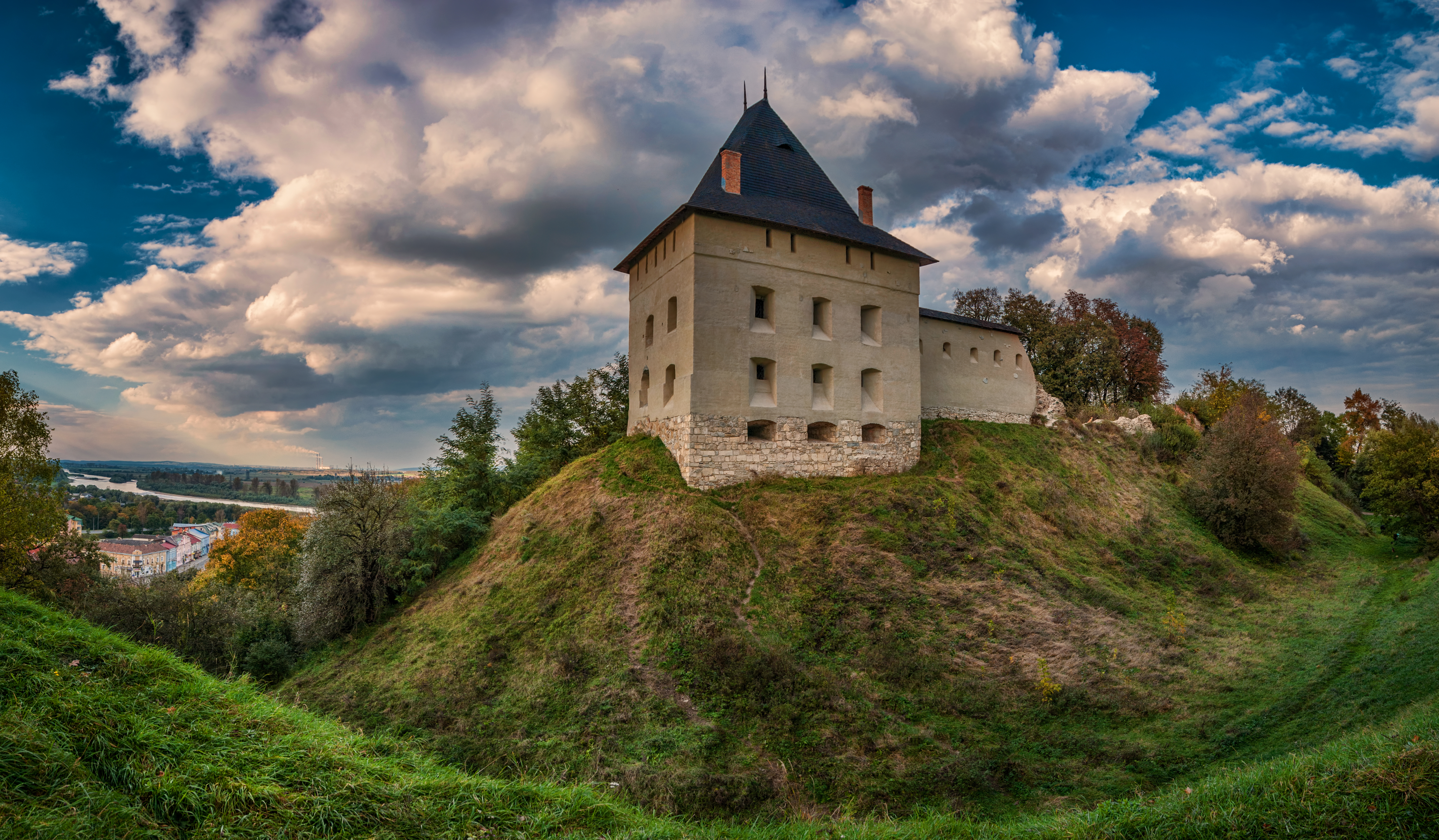
- Halych Castle

Site information
- Owner: Ukraine

Location
- Coordinates: 49°07′18.4″N 24°43′49.3″E

Immovable Monument of National Significance of Ukraine
- Official name: Замок Галицький (Halych Castle)
- Type: Architecture
- Reference no.: 090018-Н

Halych Castle (Ukrainian: Галицький замок, romanized: Halytskyi zamok), is a castle in Halych, Ukraine. The first castle here was built in the 14th century by the Polish king Casimir III the Great to protect the borders of the Kingdom of Poland after the incorporation of Red Ruthenia into it. The current ruins of the Halych starostas' castle dominate the hill above Halych. It is an architectural monument of national importance.

== History ==
The construction of the castle in Halych was ordered by King Casimir the Great, as mentioned in the 14th-century Kraków Cathedral Chronicle. In 1436, the castle was granted to the Moldavian voivode Iliaș I (after he pledged an oath of loyalty to King Władysław III of Poland). In 1509, the castle withstood a siege by the Moldavians under the command of voivode Bogdan III the One-Eyed. In 1520, the castle was renovated by the Ruthenian voivode Otto Chodecki of the Ogończyk coat of arms. The castle burned down at the end of the 16th century. The fortress was destroyed by the Tatars in 1621. It was rebuilt in 1627, this time as a masonry structure. In 1649, during the Khmelnytsky Uprising, the castle was captured by the Cossacks. The castle returned to the authority of the royal starosts in 1658, and its reconstruction soon began under the direction of the Crown infantry officer Franciszek Corazzini from Avignon, which was completed in 1661. At that time, the castle's defensive system was modernized with the construction of ramparts and redoubts. During the Polish-Turkish War, the garrison surrendered the castle to the Turks without a fight in 1676, for which the castle commander Łachowski was beheaded by order of King John III Sobieski. The Turks damaged the castle, and from then, the structure has remained in ruins. After the construction of the modern fortress in Stanisławów, the strategic value of the Halych castle significantly decreased. After the First Partition of Poland in 1772, the castle ruins along with the surrounding lands came under Austrian Partition. Part of the walls was dismantled by order of the Austrian authorities in 1796. Remnants of the noble tower and the chapel of St. Catherine have survived to the present day.

== Architecture and Equipment ==
The fortified stronghold, surrounded by a deep moat, could be entered through three gates. The castle had five towers. The inspection from 1627 describes the structure as follows: The castle has a masonry gate with a cellar, where land and town books are stored; above the cellar is a hall or chamber with no windows, and next to it is a small room where scribes work. At the gate there are nine chambers, in which nobles and townsmen hide their belongings from the enemy. The structure is long, with these nine chambers to the side; a small turret, to which a new structure is attached; a masonry tower and a wall to the church, in which there is a sculpted altar of white alabaster, and at the end a wooden tower; from the corner of the castle down to the town there is a beaten path with two towers; a trench to the south. All the structures with their towers require great and speedy repair. Equipment: two bronze cannons, two bronze mortars; sixteen arquebuses, of which only four were handed over, the fifth without a stock; a barrel of gunpowder, an iron chain.

== Bibliography ==
- Зеновій Федунків. Галицький замок // Пам'ятки України, 2013. — № 6 за червень. — С. 44-53.
