= Krylos =

Rural locality in Ivano-Frankivsk Oblast, Ukraine

Krylos Крилос
- Village
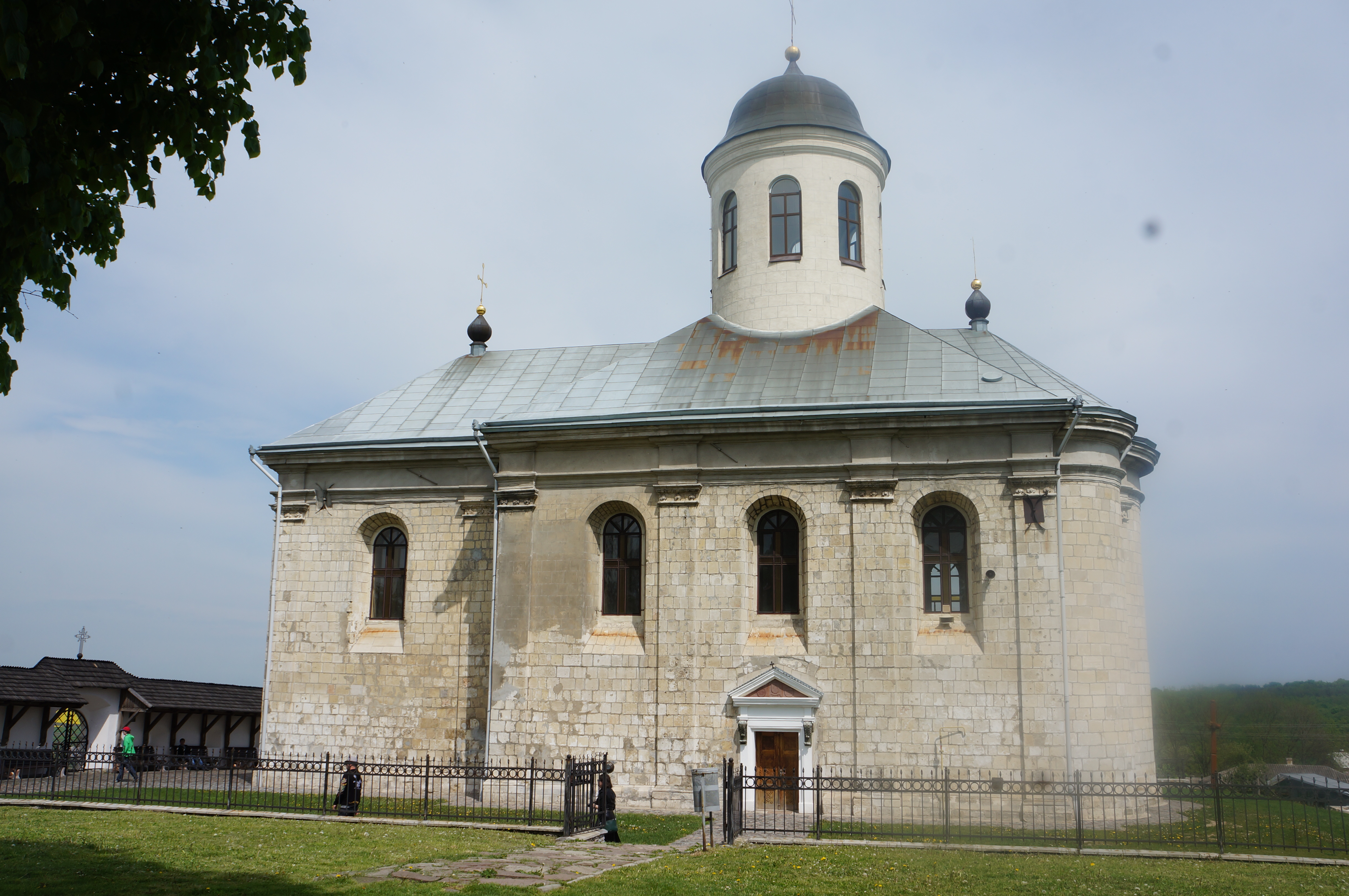
- Dormition Church in Krylos
- Interactive map of Krylos
- Location of Krylos Krylos (Ukraine)
- Coordinates: 49.0883°N 24.6886°E
- Country: Ukraine
- Oblast: Ivano-Frankivsk Oblast
- Raion: Ivano-Frankivsk Raion
- Hromada: Halych urban hromada

Population (2001)
  - Total: 1,697

Krylos is a village of Ivano-Frankivsk Raion in Ivano-Frankivsk Oblast, Ukraine. It is located 5 kilometres (3 miles) south of modern Halych and is part of the Ancient Halych National Reserve. The village covers an area of 19.18 square kilometres (7.41 square miles). The village council consists of 16 people. Krylos belongs to Halych urban hromada, one of the hromadas of Ukraine.

== History ==
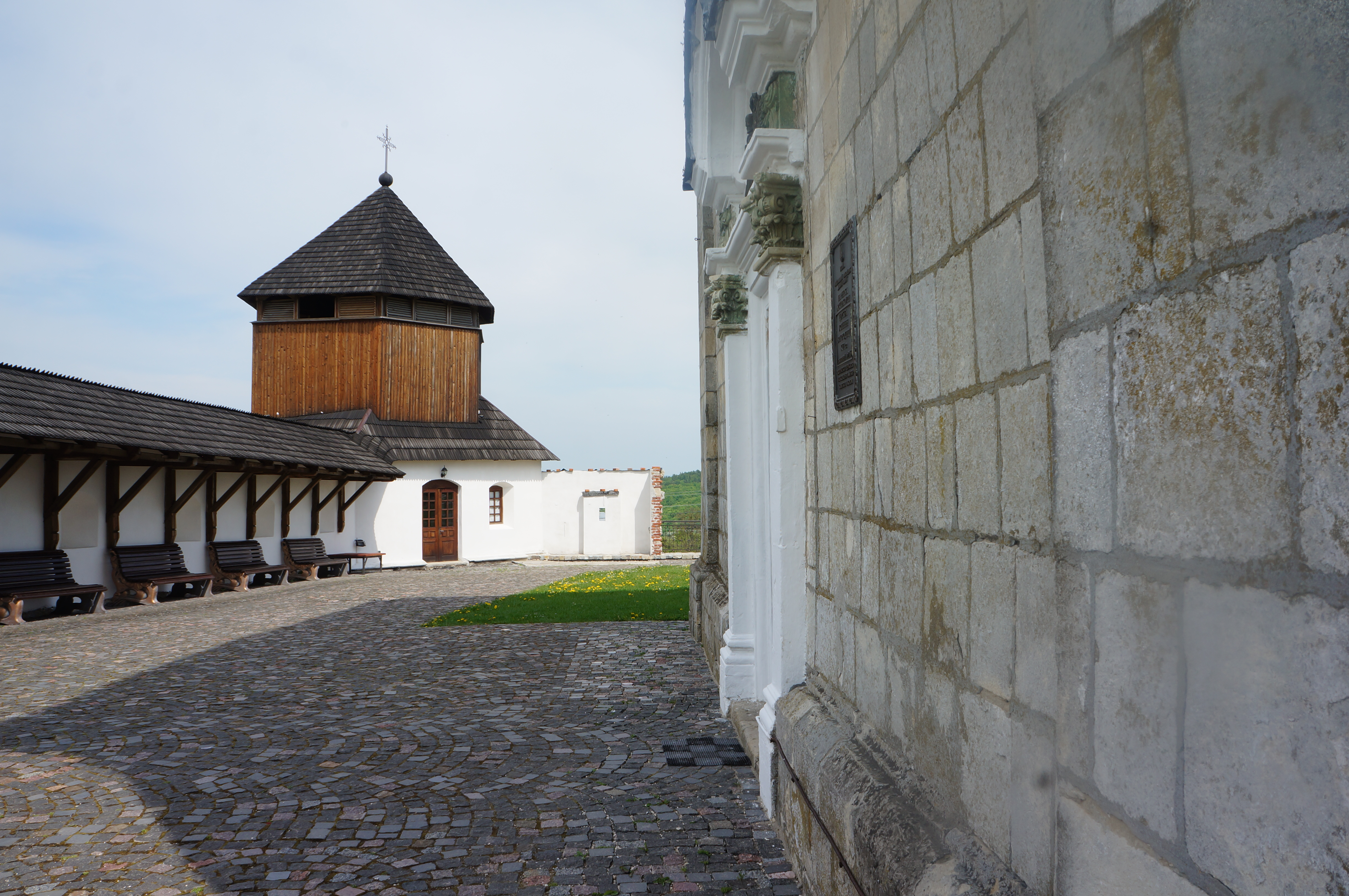
Reconstructed fortifications of medieval Halych

Krylos is located on the site of the Princely city center of Halych, which was founded in 898 AD. The territory of Krylos extended as far as the Limnytsia River to the west and Dniester River to the north. Immediately to the west of the Krylos settlement flows the Lukva River, which in ancient times was wider and deeper than it is today. The Lukva River served as a natural obstruction to invaders. On the east side of the Halych citadel flowed a small creek that with its valley provided an additional defensive barrier. On top of the hill where the local Dormition Cathedral (Ukrainian: Галицький Успенський собор) displayed its stature to the surrounding landscapes, a series of tall defensive earth ramparts were built that served as the defense barriers in the past. It was a politically administrative and large religious center of White Croats.

Until 18 July 2020, Krylos belonged to Halych Raion. The raion was abolished in July 2020 as part of the administrative reform of Ukraine, which reduced the number of raions of Ivano-Frankivsk Oblast to six. The area of Halych Raion was merged into Ivano-Frankivsk Raion.

== Points of interest ==
The majority of the archeological, architectural, and historical remnants of the former capital can be found here, which together with the Halych Historical Center and a number of other local historic locations make up the national reserve "Ancient Halych".

Krylos is now a village with remains and the partially reconstructed Dormition Church, considered to be from medieval times. Next to this church Prince Yaroslav Osmomysl was buried. A chapel has been constructed on the site of the original Dormition Cathedral.

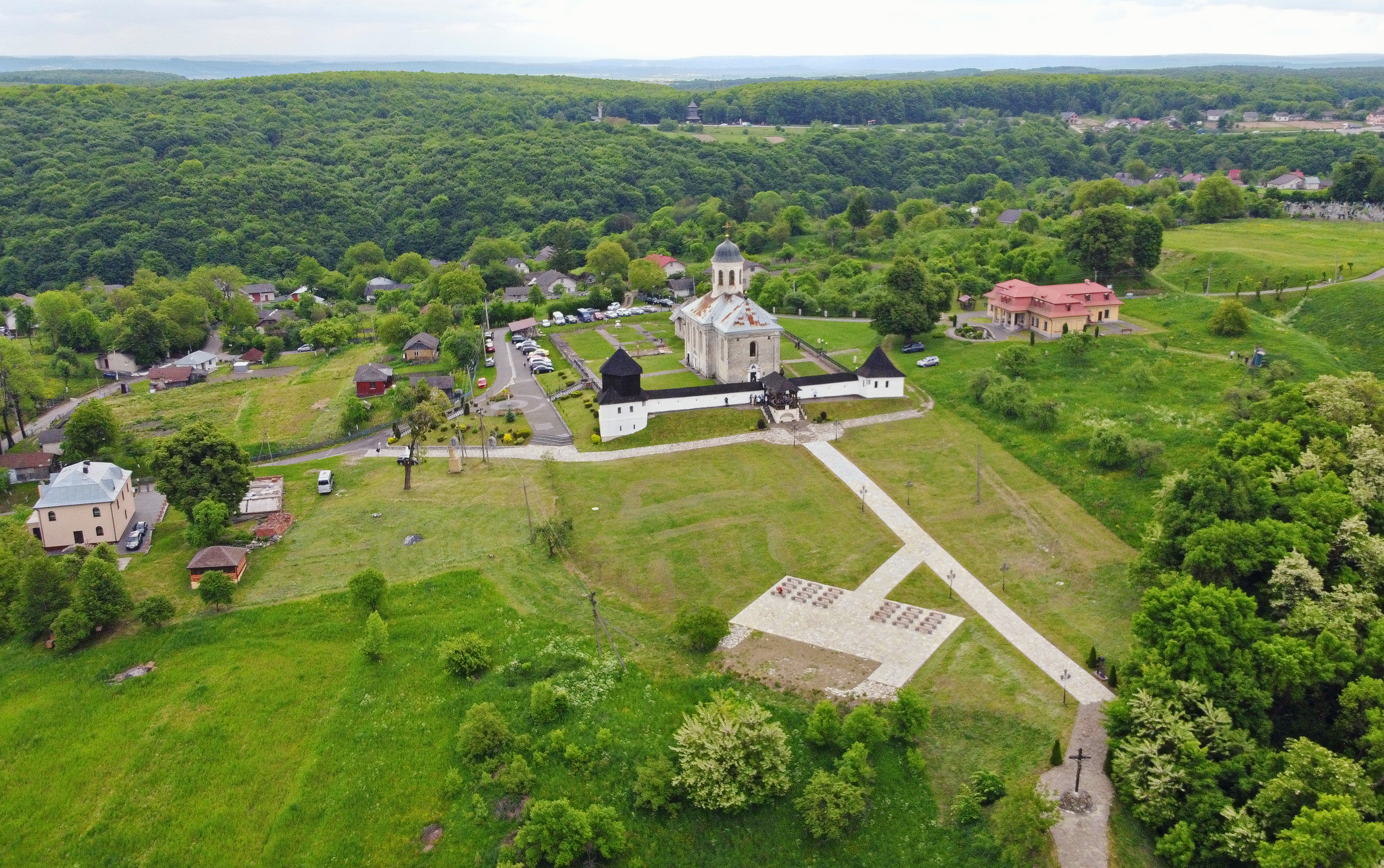
Site of the medieval Halych from above

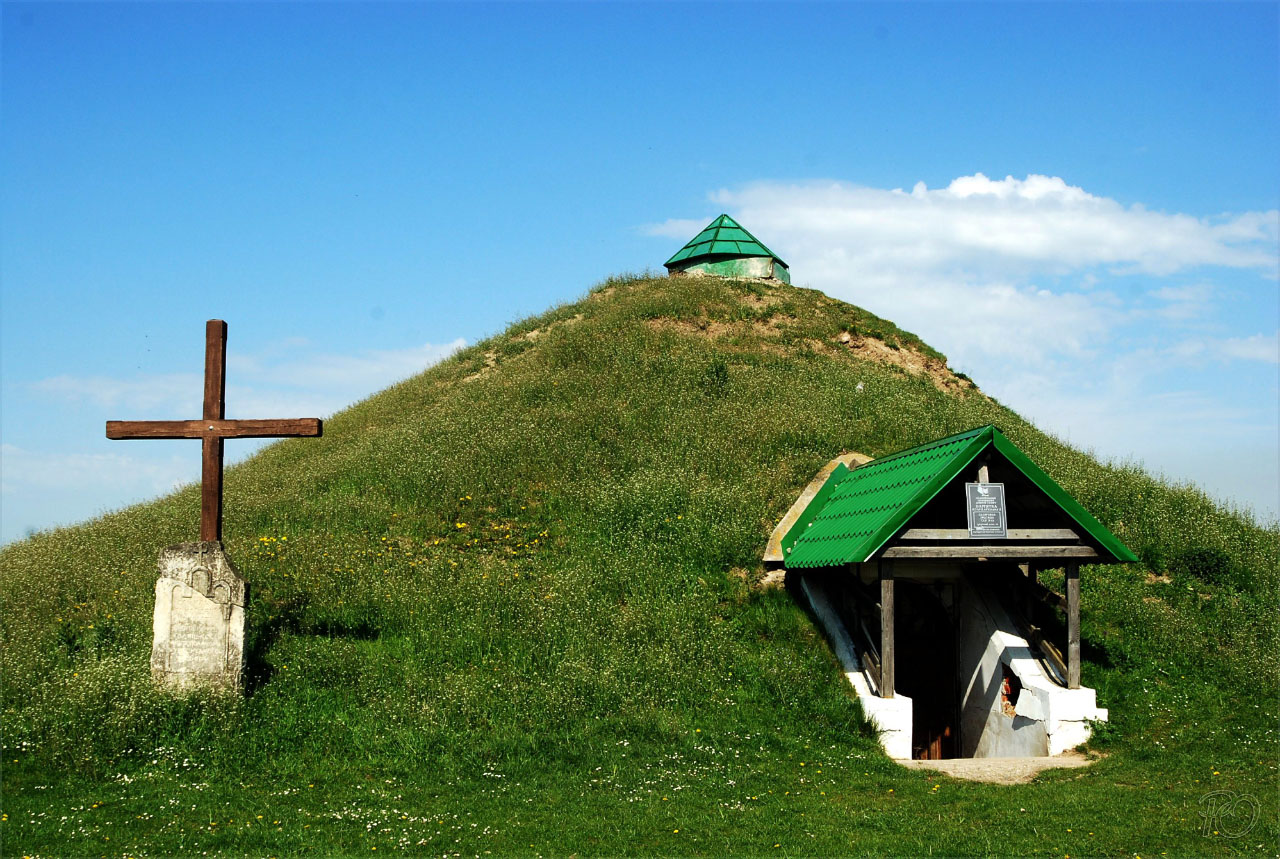
Halychyna Grave

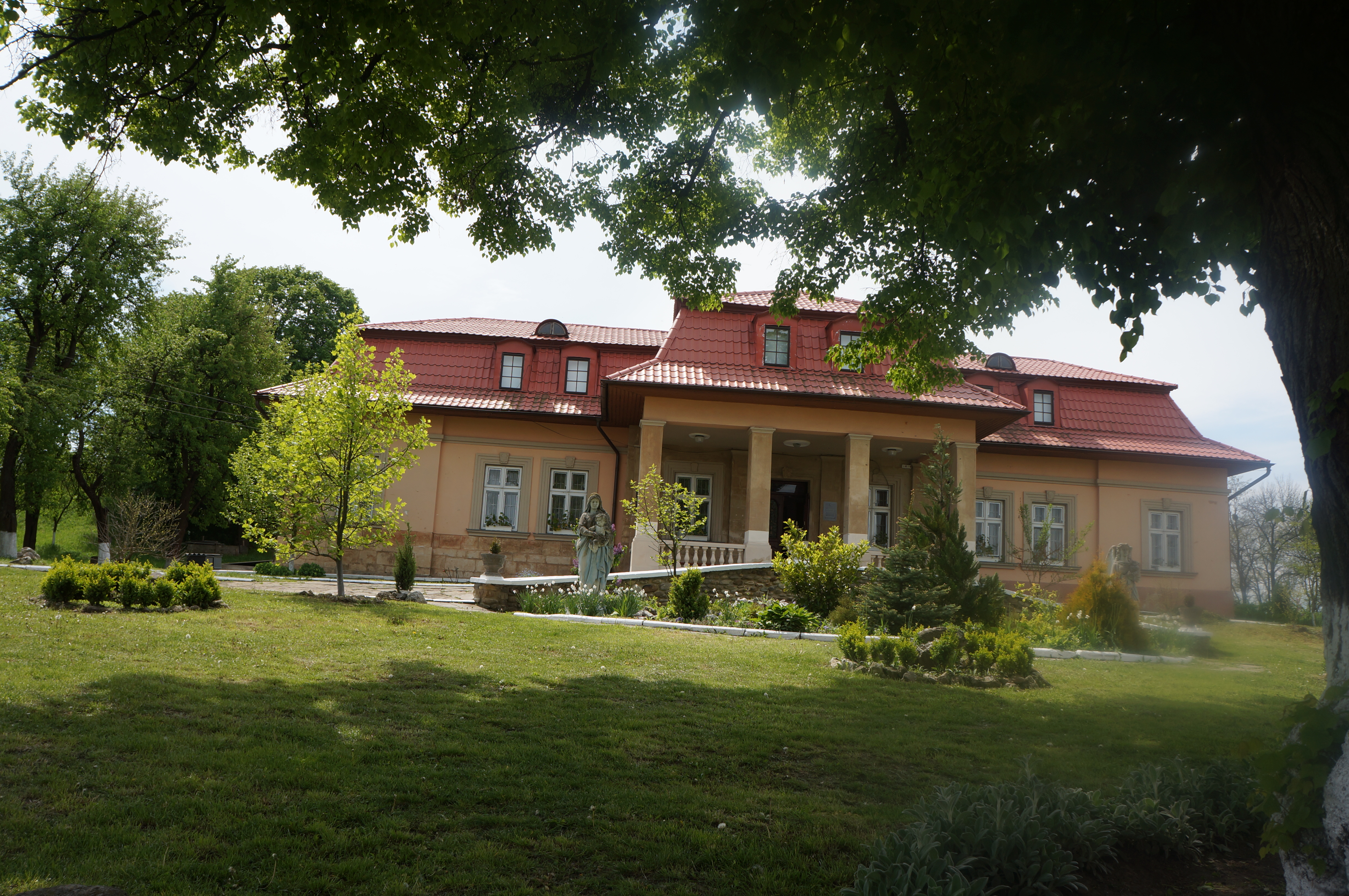
Museum of medieval Halych

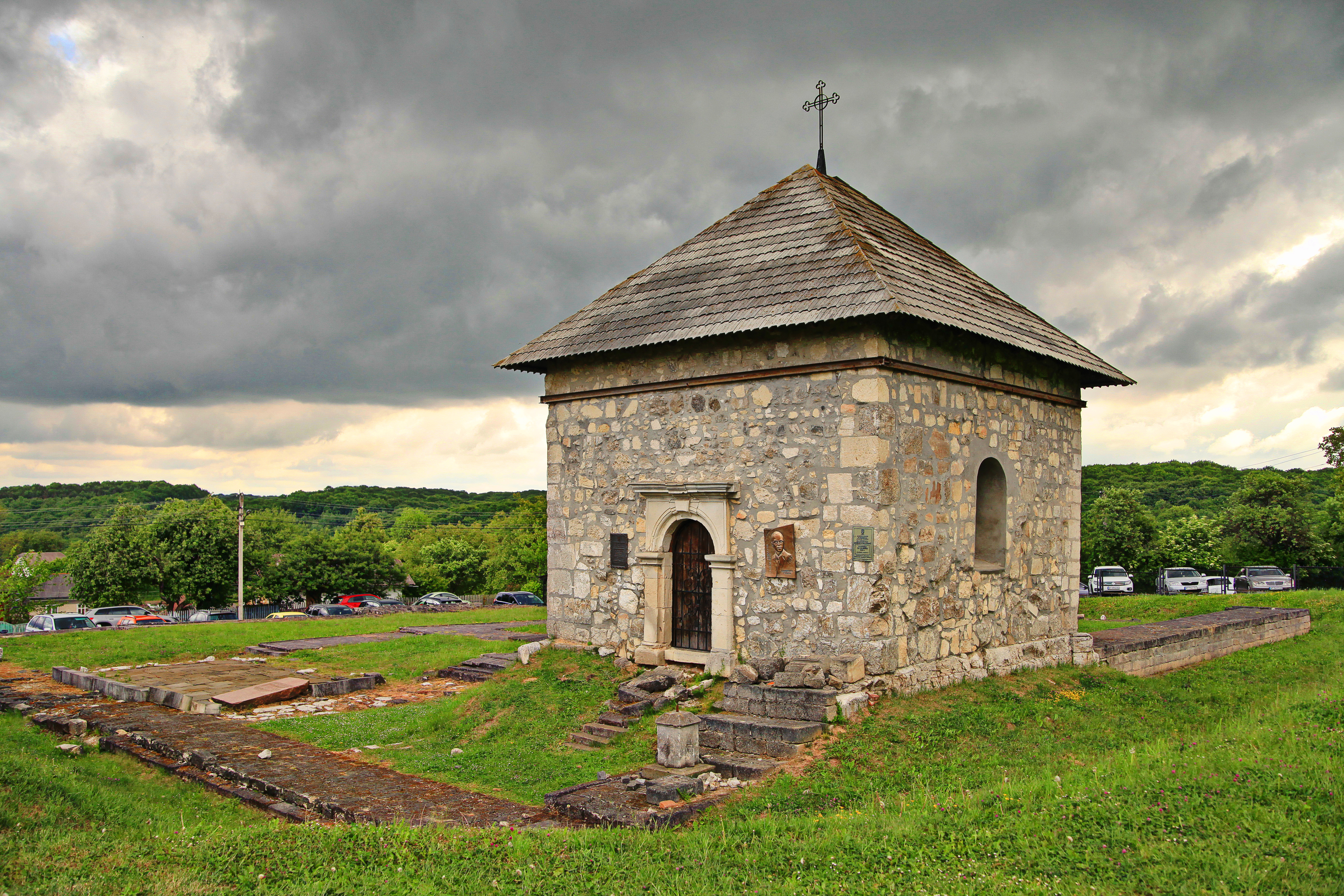
St. Basil's Chapel

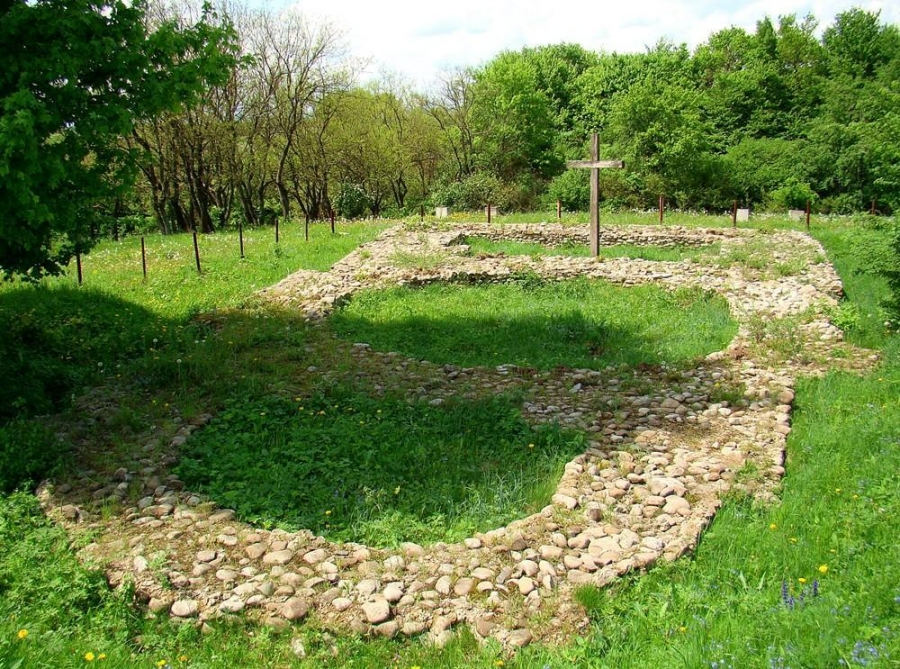
Foundations of the medieval St. Elijah Church

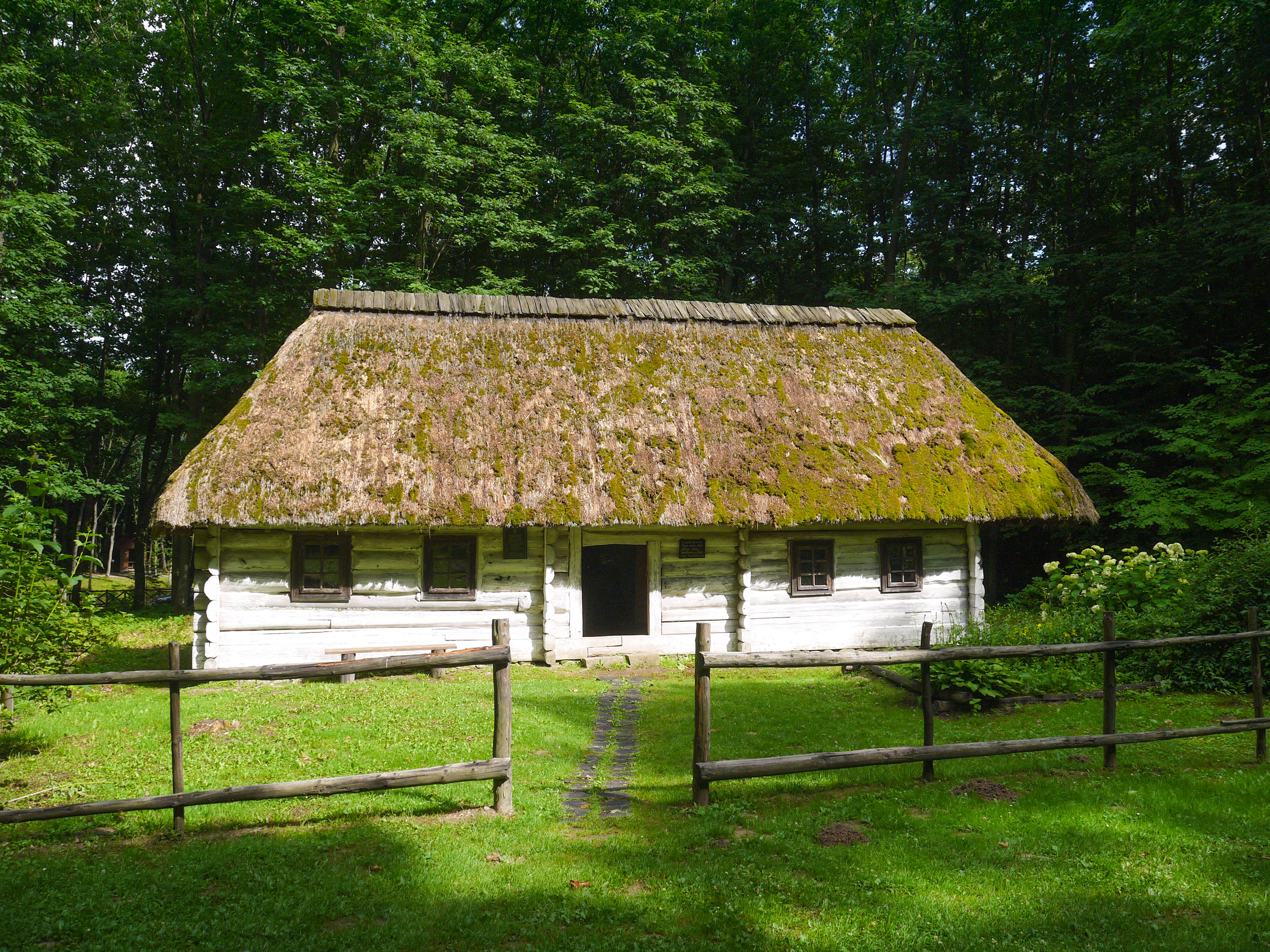
Boyko khata in the open-air museum of ethnography

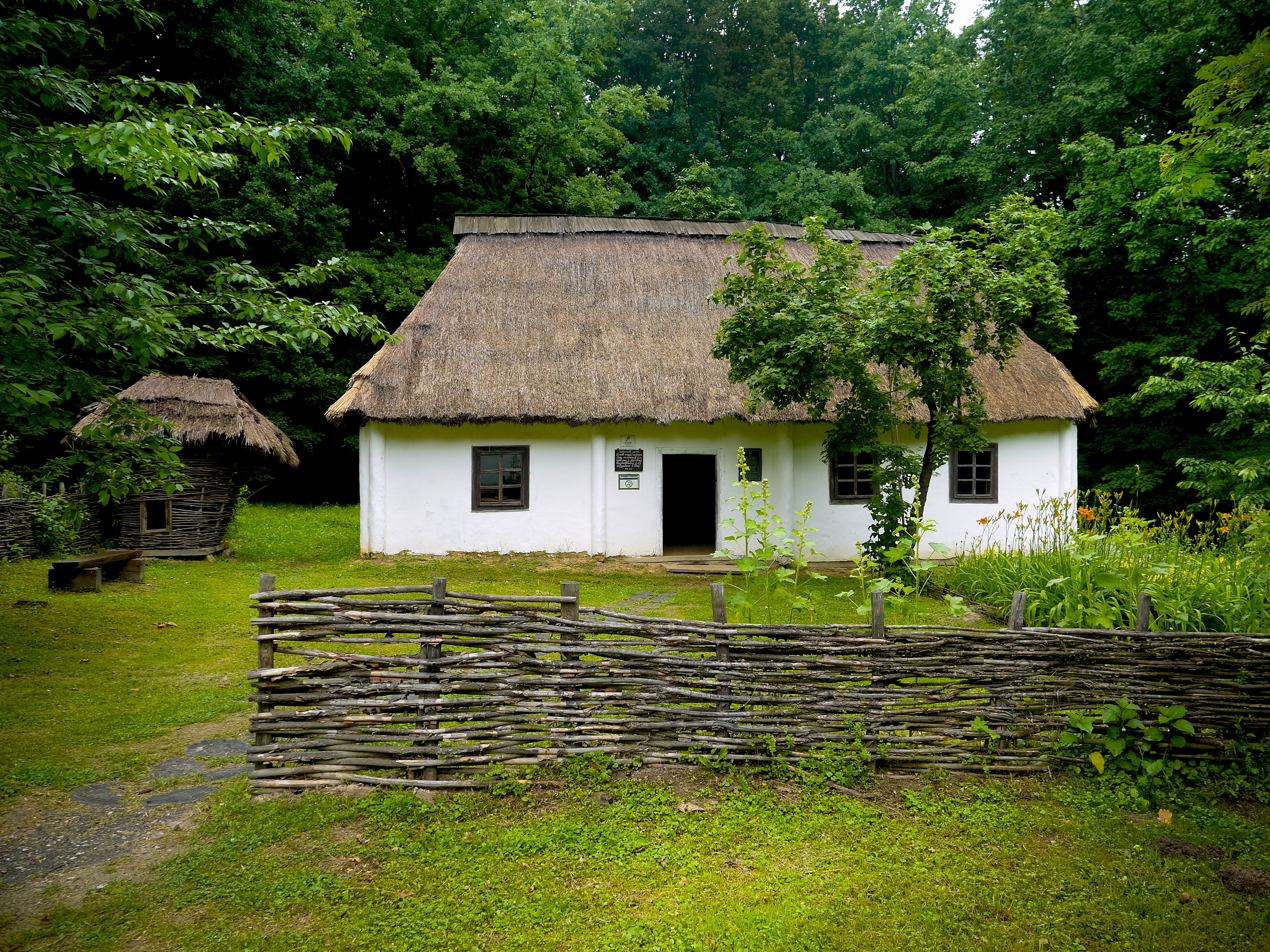
Pokuttian building in the museum

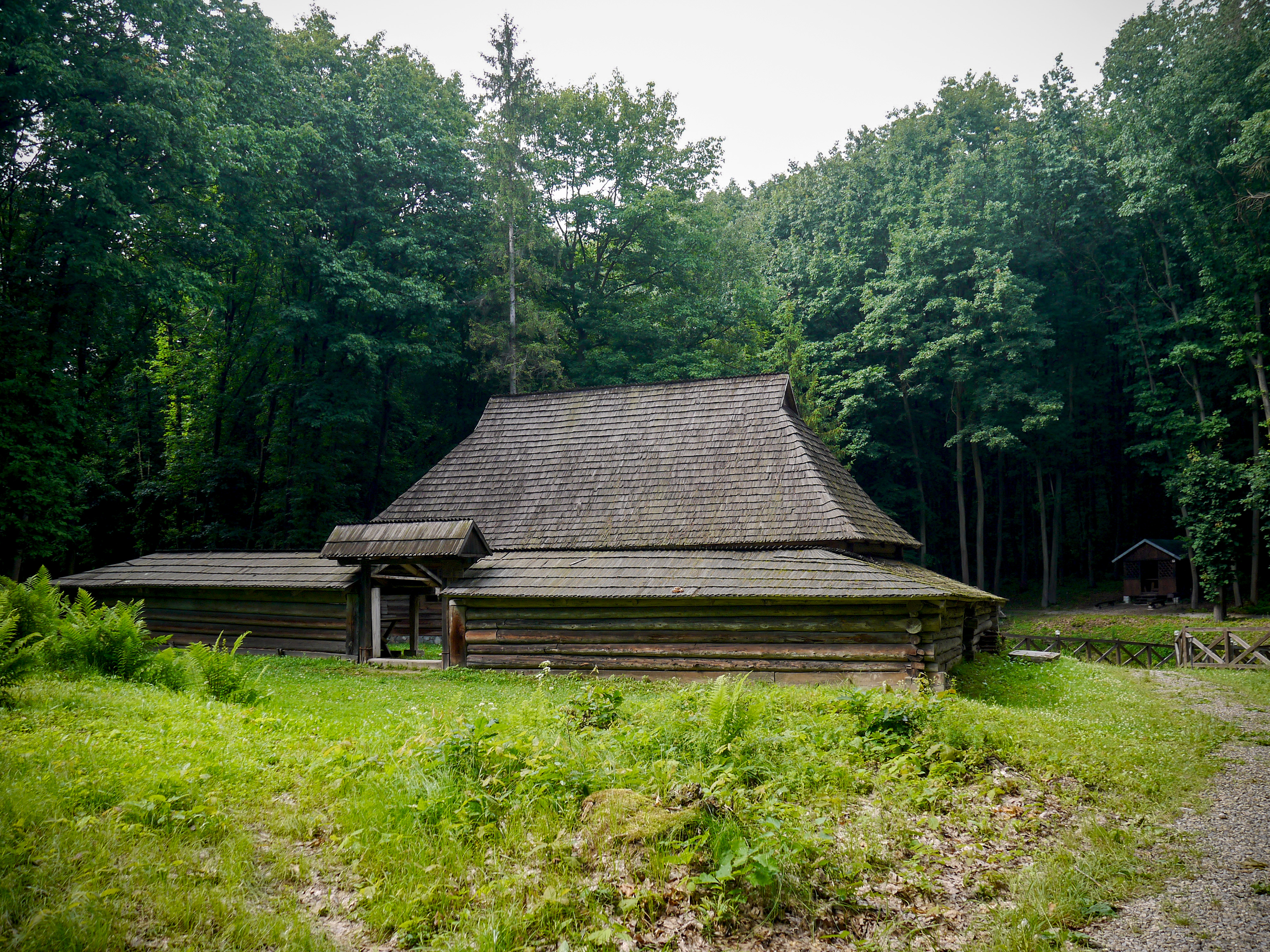
Hutsul hrazhda in the museum
