= Kashtanova (Kyiv Light Rail) =

Kyiv Light Rail station

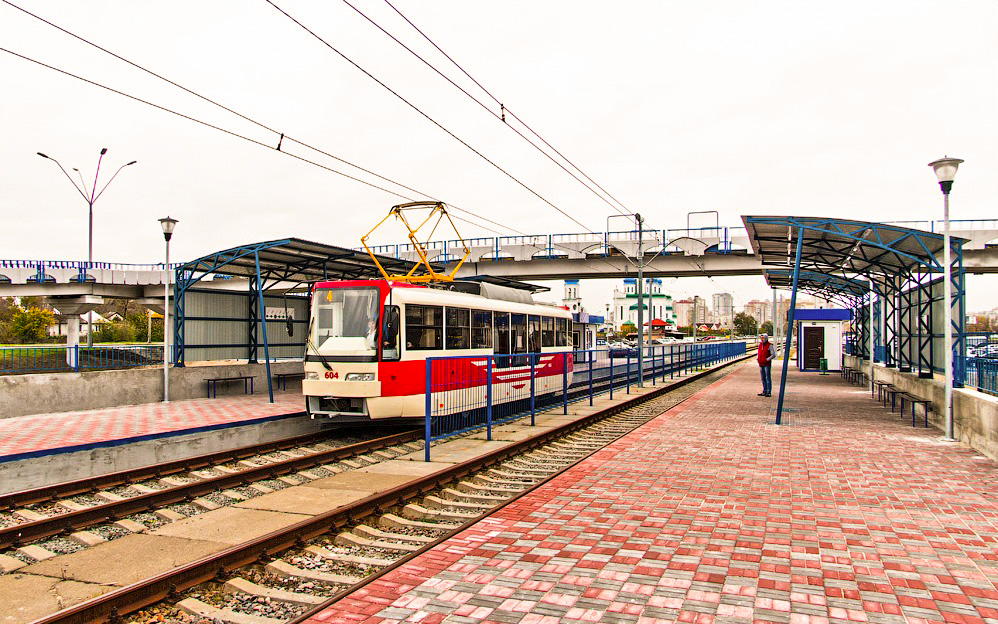

General information
- Coordinates: 50°30′23″N 30°35′00″E
- Owner: Kyivpastrans
- Line: Livoberezhna line
- Platforms: 2 side platforms

History
- Opened: May 26, 2000
- Rebuilt: October 25, 2012

Services
Preceding station	Kyiv Light Rail	Following station
Romana Shukhevycha towards Raiduzhnyi	Line 4	Ronalda Reihana towards Myloslavska
Romana Shukhevycha towards Raiduzhnyi	Line 5	Ronalda Reihana towards Serzha Lyfaria Street
Location

Kashtanova (Ukrainian: Каштанова) is a station on the Livoberezhna Line of the Kyiv Light Rail system, in Ukraine. It was opened on May 26, 2000 and reopened after a significant modernization of the line on October 26, 2012.

Kashtanova is located in between the Ronalda Reihana and Romana Shukhevycha stations.

At one point the Kyiv City authorities proposed creating the Vulytsia Kashtanova station of the Kyiv Metro's Livoberezhna Line, although that entire project was scrapped in favor of expanding the existing light rail system.
