= Ronalda Reihana (Kyiv Light Rail) =

Kyiv Light Rail station

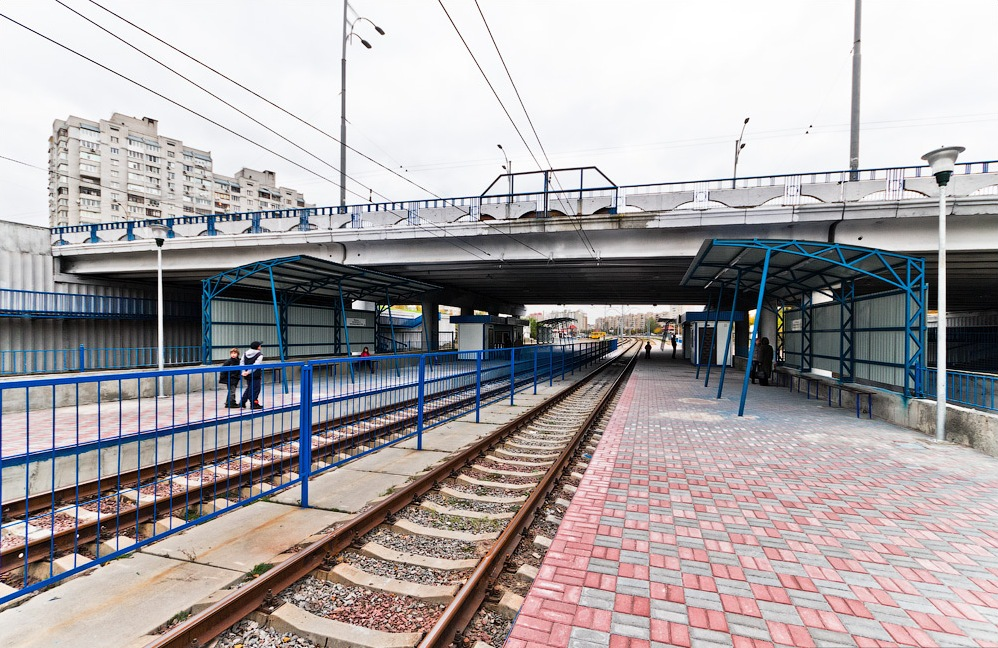

General information
- Coordinates: 50°30′41″N 30°35′44″E
- Owner: Kyivpastrans
- Line: Livoberezhna line
- Platforms: 2 side platforms

History
- Opened: May 26, 2000
- Rebuilt: October 25, 2012

Services
Preceding station	Kyiv Light Rail	Following station
Kashtanova towards Raiduzhnyi	Line 4	Serzha Lyfaria towards Myloslavska
Kashtanova towards Raiduzhnyi	Line 5	Serzha Lyfaria towards Serzha Lyfaria Street
Location

Ronalda Reihana (Ukrainian: Рональда Рейгана; in 2000–2008 known as Draizera, in 2012–2024 known as Teodora Draizera) is a station on the Livoberezhna Line of the Kyiv Light Rail system. It was opened on May 26, 2000 and reopened after a significant modernization of the line on October 26, 2012.

Ronalda Reihana is located in between the Serzha Lyfaria and Kashtanova stations. Initially, It is named in honor of Theodore Dreiser, an American novelist and journalist, but it was renamed in 2024 in honor of Ronald Reagan, American politician, actor and 40th president of the United States.

At one point the Kyiv City authorities proposed creating the Vulytsia Draizera station of the Kyiv Metro's Livoberezhna Line, although that entire project was scrapped in favor of expanding the existing light rail system.
