= Serzha Lyfaria (Kyiv Light Rail) =

Kyiv Light Rail station

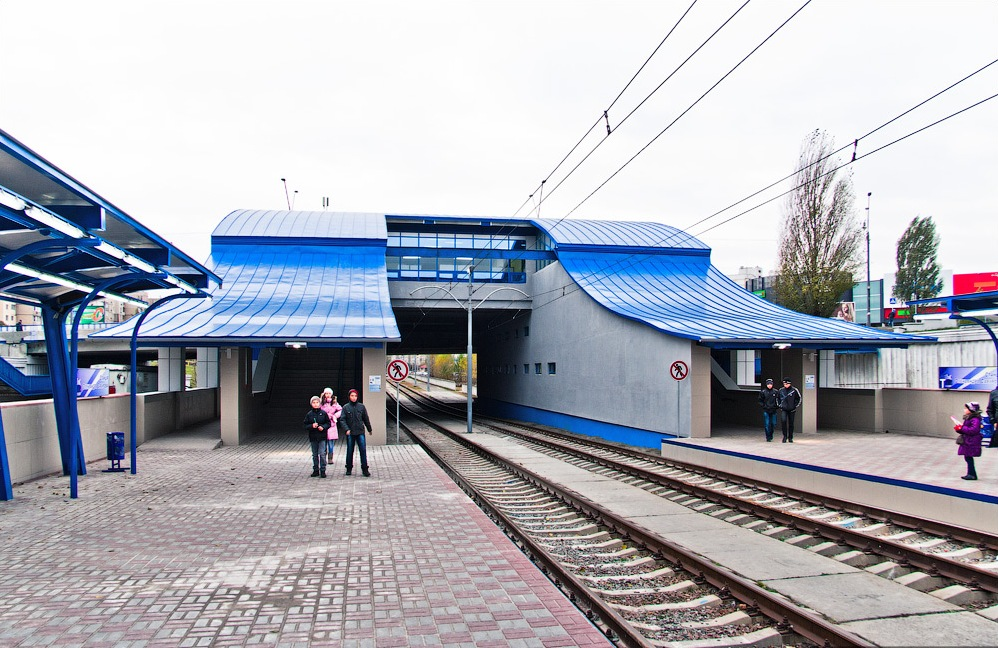

General information
- Coordinates: 50°31′00″N 30°36′16″E
- Owner: Kyivpastrans
- Line: Livoberezhna line
- Platforms: 2 side platforms

History
- Opened: May 26, 2000
- Rebuilt: October 25, 2012

Services
Preceding station	Kyiv Light Rail	Following station
Ronalda Reihana towards Raiduzhnyi	Line 4	Oleksandry Ekster towards Myloslavska
Ronalda Reihana towards Raiduzhnyi	Line 5	Oleksandry Ekster towards Serzha Lyfaria Street
Location

Serzha Lyfaria (Ukrainian: Сержа Лифаря; from 2000 to 2008, Saburova, from 2008 to 2019, Oleksandra Saburova) is a station on the Livoberezhna Line of the Kyiv Light Rail system. It was opened on May 26, 2000 and reopened after a significant modernization of the line on October 26, 2012.

Serzha Lyfaria is located in between the Oleksandry Ekster and Ronalda Reihana stations. Initially named in honor of Alexander Saburov, a Soviet partisan, it was renamed in 2019 in honor of Serge Lifar, a French ballet dancer and choreographer of Ukrainian origin.

At one point the Kyiv City authorities proposed creating the Vulytsia Saburova station of the Kyiv Metro's Livoberezhna Line, although that entire project was scrapped in favor of expanding the existing light rail system.
