= Livoberezhna line =

Livoberezhna line may refer to:

- Livoberezhna line (Kyiv Light Rail), an existing line of the Kyiv Light Rail system
- Livoberezhna line (Kyiv Metro), a planned line of the Kyiv Metro system
