= Small Ring Road, Kyiv =

Inner beltway of Kyiv, Ukraine

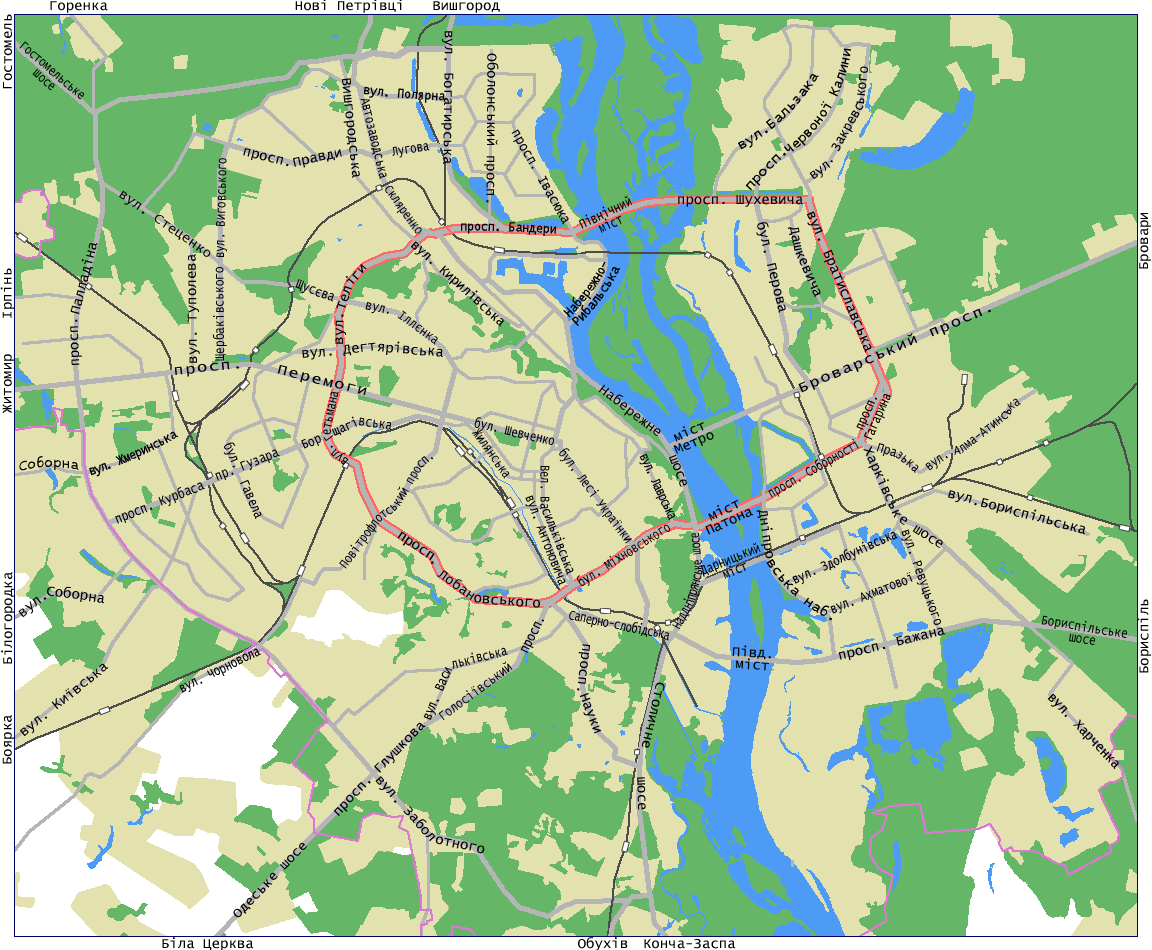
Small Ring Road of Kyiv (2023)

The Small Ring Road (Ukrainian: Мала́ окружна́ доро́га, romanized: Malá okruzhná doróha) is a motorway in Kyiv, a ring road that runs through the city, mostly within the city limits. The Small Ring Road has a total length of 38.9 kilometres, and consists of several administratively separate roads and squares (such as Demiivska Square), and two bridges across the Dnipro: the Pivnichnyi Bridge (Northern Bridge) and the Paton Bridge.

It is distinguished from the Great Ring Road, Kyiv (or Big Ring Road), which is a larger, unfinished ring road currently under construction. The Great Ring Road (or Kyiv Ring Road) has a projected length of 214 kilometres (including existing roads such as the Kiltseva Road), that is mostly located outside the city limits of Kyiv, and only on the right bank of the Dnipro.

== History of construction ==
Construction of the Small Ring Road began in the 1950s with Vadym Hetman Street, part of which was originally called Okruzhna Street, and Oleksandr Dovzhenko Street, which was originally called Novookruzhna ("New Ring"). Construction was completed in 1990 (with the exception of a small section near the Chernihivska metro station, renamed from "Komsomolska" in 1991).

== Route of the Small Ring Road ==
=== Notes on infrastructural terminology ===
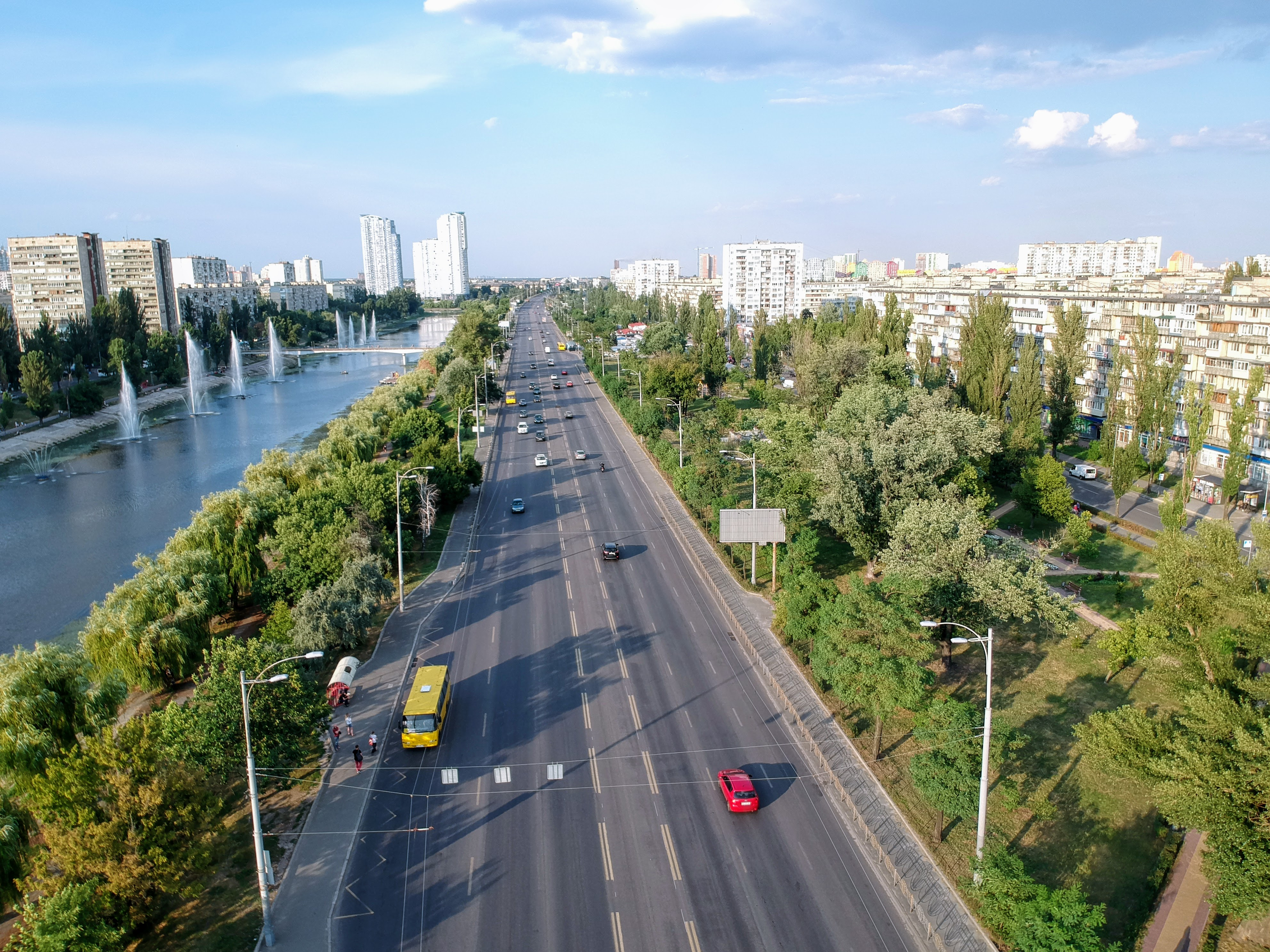
Проспект Соборності Prospekt Sobornosti, translatable as "Unity Boulevard/Avenue" (July 2019).

- In Ukrainian, the word indicating the type of road, such as "street", usually comes first, and the person or thing the street is named after comes second in the genitive case. When translated to English, the word "street" moves to the end, while the named person or thing is customarily rendered in the nominative case. For example, вулиця Михайла Грушевського, vulytsia Mykhaila Hrushevskoho is translated as "Mykhailo Hrushevskyi Street".
- The standard Ukrainian term for a street is vulytsia (вулиця, officially vulycja according to DSTU 9112:2021; compare Belarusian вуліца vulitsa; Polish/Slovak ulica; Czech ulice; and Russian улица ulitsa).
- Some broad streets are called buljvar (бульвар), literally "boulevard" (for example "Prymorskyi Boulevard" in Odesa, or "Lesya Ukrainka Boulevard" in Kyiv).
- Many roads are named prospekt (проспект), a Slavic term for a broad, multi-lane, very long street that serves as an arterial road. "Prospekt" is usually left untranslated (sometimes romanised with a 'c' instead of a 'k'); alternately, it may be translated as "avenue" in American English, while Commonwealth English prefers "boulevard" for this type of road as well. The noun "prospekt" may be situated before or after the person or thing the road is named after; for example, "Prospect Beresteiskyi" (before), or "Brovarskyi prospect" (after).
- The conventional term for a road junction accessible to motor vehicles is ploshcha (площа, compare "European Square" in Kyiv), while a (partial) pedestrian zone is usually called a maidan (compare "Maidan Nezalezhnosti").
- A bridge is simply a mist (міст).

=== Streets, prospekts, boulevards and bridges ===
Clockwise, starting from the Shulyavsky Overpass:

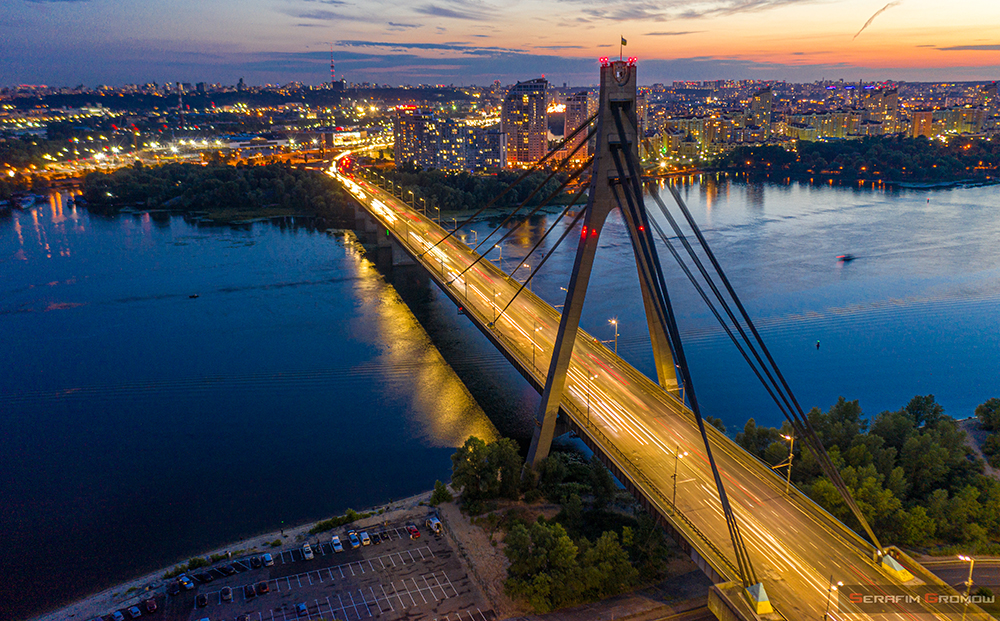
Pivnichnyi Bridge or Northern Bridge at night, July 2020

- Oleksandra Dovzhenko Street (вулиця Олександра Довженка, formerly Новоокружна "New Ring"), built in the 1950s;
- Olena Teliha Street (вулиця Олени Теліги, formerly Новоокружна "New Ring", Дем'яна Коротченка "Demyan Korotchenko"), built in the 1950s;
- Prospekt Stepan Bandera (Проспект Степана Бандери; formerly Червоноказацька "Red Cossack", проспект Червоних Козаків "Prospekt Red Cossacks", Московський проспект "Moscow Prospekt"), built in 1976;
- Pivnichnyi Bridge or Northern Bridge (Північний міст, formerly Московський міст "Moscow Bridge"), opened in 1976;
- Prospekt Roman Shukhevych (проспект Романа Шухевича, formerly Новий проспект "New Prospekt", проспект Генерала Ватутіна "Prospekt General Vatutin"), built in the 1970s;
- Bratislavska Street (Братиславська вулиця), partially laid in the 1960s, completed and reconstructed in the late 1980s;
- Hnata Khotkevycha Street (вулиця Гната Хоткевича, formerly Червоногвардійська "Red Guard"), built in the 1950s;
- Prospekt Leonid Kadenyuk (проспект Леоніда Каденюка, formerly вулиця Діагональна "Diagonal Street", Юрія Гагаріна "Yuri Gagarin"), built in the 1950s;
- Unity Prospekt (проспект Соборності, formerly проспект Возз'єднання "Prospekt Reunification"), built in the 1950s, received its current name in 2016 in honour of Unity of Ukraine Day;
- Paton Bridge (Міст Патона), opened in 1953;
- Mykola Mikhnovsky Boulevard (бульвар Миколи Міхновського, formerly Автострада "Autostrada", бульвар Дружби народів "Friendship of Peoples Boulevard"), built in the 1950s;
- Prospekt Valery Lobanovsky (проспект Валерія Лобановського, formerly вулиці Червонозоряна "Red Star", Семена Палія "Paliya Seeds", Совська "Sovska", then Червонозоряний проспект "Red Star Prospekt"), built in the 1950s and 2000s;
- Chokolivskyi Boulevard (Чоколівський бульвар, formerly бульвар Леніна "Lenin Boulevard"), built in the 1950s;
- Vadym Hetman Street (вулиця Вадима Гетьмана, formerly вулиці Окружна "Ring", Індустріальна "Industrial"), built in the 1950s.

=== Squares ===
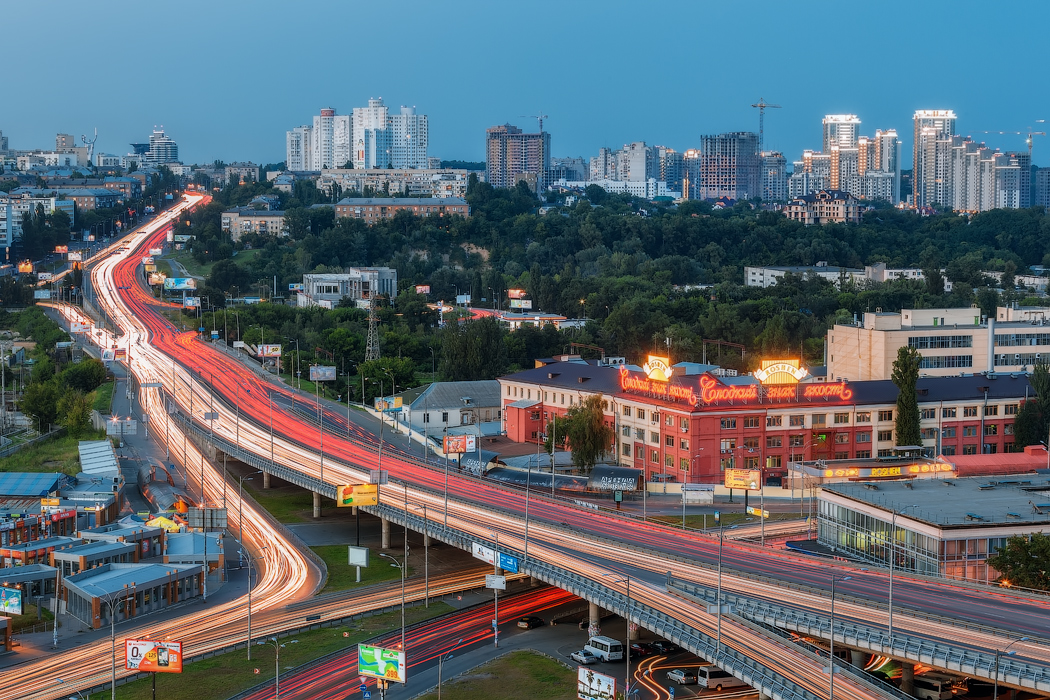
Demiivska Square at night, July 2014

The Small Ring Road passes through the following squares:

- Heroes of the UPA Square is the intersection of Prospekt Stepan Bandera and Prospekt Obolonsky (Obolonsky district).
- Kerchenska Squar is the intersection of the prospekts Romana Shukhevycha, Chervona Kalyna, and Voskresensky (Dniprovsky and Desnyansky districts).
- Chernihivska Square is the intersection of Hnata Khotkevycha Street, Bratyslavska Street, and Brovarskyi prospect (Dniprovsky District).
- Darnytska Square (formerly Ленінградська площа "Leningrad Square") is the intersection of the prospekts Sobornosti, Leonid Kadenyuk, and Myra; and the streets of Budivelnyk, Sosyura, Prazskaya, and Kharkiv (Dniprovskyi district).
- Navodnytska Square is the intersection of Staronavodnytska and Lavrska streets, and Mykola Mikhnovsky Boulevard (Pechersk district).
- Demiivska Square (Деміївська площа, formerly Московська площа "Moscow Square") is the intersection of the prospekts Holosiivskyi, Valeriy Lobanovskyi, and Nauka ("Science"), and Mykola Mikhnovskyi Boulevard (Holosiivskyi district).
- Sevastopol Square is the intersection of Chokolivskyi Boulevard, the prospekts Povitroflotskyi and Valeriy Lobanovskyi, and Svyatoslav Khorobryho Street (Solomyanskyi District).
- Cosmonauts Square is the intersection of Chokolivskyi Boulevard and Antonov Aviation Designer Street (Solomyanskyi District).

== Mainline characteristics ==
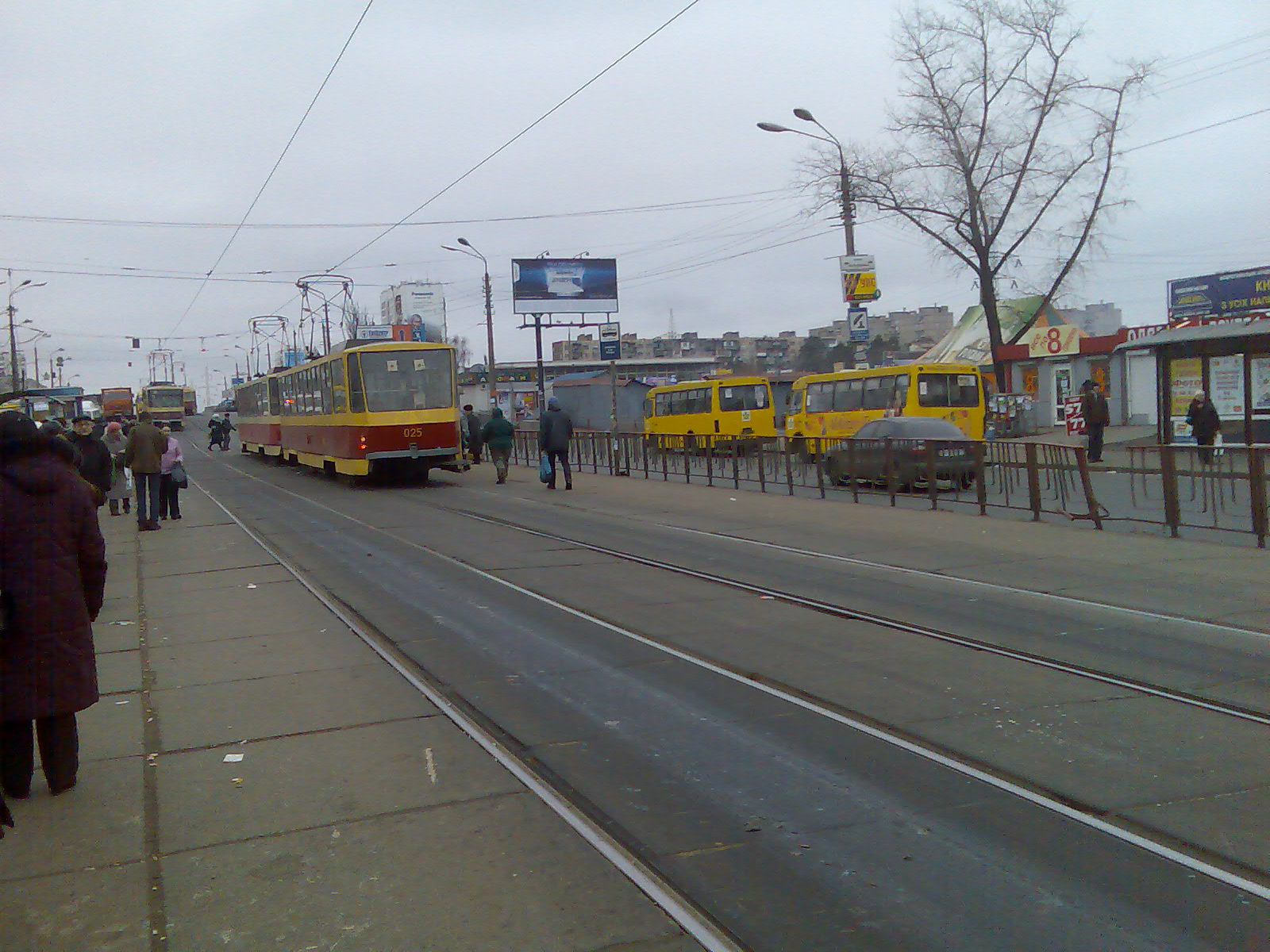
The narrowest point of the Ring is the overpass above the Chernihivska metro station (December 2007)

The narrowest point of the Small Ring Road of Kyiv is the overpass above the Chernihivska metro station.

In different sections, there are between four (near the Chernihivska metro station) and eight (Pivnichnyi Bridge) lanes. The ring road is 38.9 km long. The Small Ring Road includes 18 multi-level transport interchanges.

== Transport ==
=== Metro and light rail stations ===
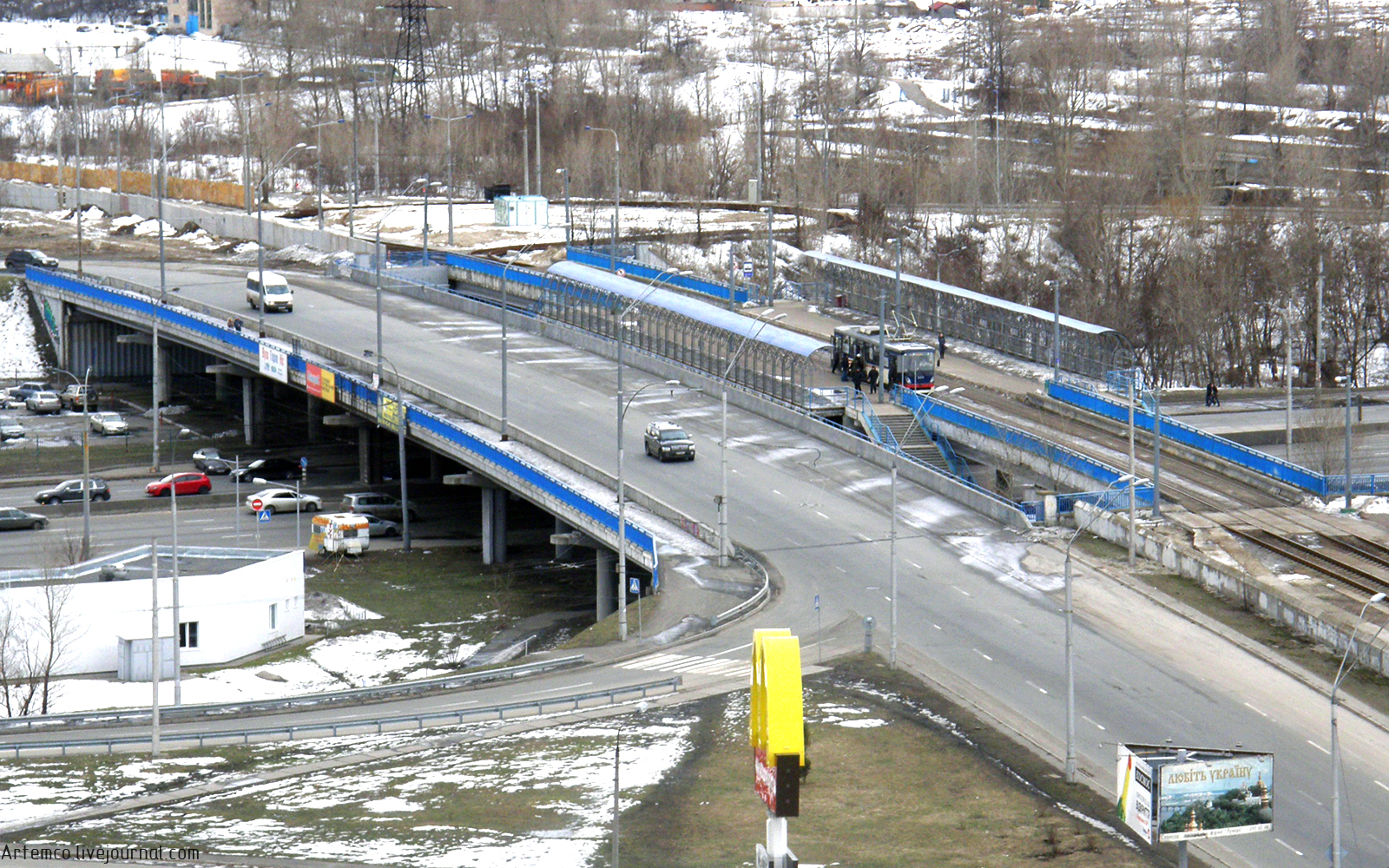
Rapid tram station ‘Romana Shukhevycha’ in March 2013

Clockwise, starting from the north:

- Line 2 ‘Pochaina’ Лінія 2 «Почайна»
- Rapid tram station ‘Romana Shukhevycha’ Станція швидкісного трамвая «Романа Шухевича»
- Line 1 ‘Chernihivska’ Лінія 1 «Чернігівська»
- Line 3 ‘Druzhby Narodiv’ Лінія 3 «Дружби народів»
- Line 2 ‘Demiivska’ Лінія 2 «Деміївська»
- Rapid tram station 'Industrialna' Станція швидкісного трамвая «Індустріальна»
- Line 1 ‘Shuliavska’ Лінія 1 «Шулявська»
- Line 3 ‘Dorogozhychi’ Лінія 3 «Дорогожичі»

== See also ==
- Great Ring Road, Kyiv (or Big Ring Road)

== Sources ==
- Kudrytskyi, Anatolii Viktorovych; Ponomarenko, Lidiya Antonivna; Riznyk, Oleksandr (1995). Вулиці Києва. Довідник [Streets of Kyiv: a handbook] (in Ukrainian). Kyiv: Ukrainska Entsyklopediia Imeni M.P. Bazhana. ISBN 5-88500-070-0.
- Humeniuk, Oleksandra; Shapovalov, Oleksij (30 June 2021). "Transport modeling in the development of a complex transport scheme on the example of the city of Kyiv (Ukraine)". Technology Audit and Production Reserves. 3 (2(59)): 51–54. doi:10.15587/2706-5448.2021.235469. ISSN 2706-5448.
- Ivannikova, Viktoriia; Nesterov, Oleksii (24 January 2022). "Model of Transport System Optimization in Kyiv (Ukraine)". In Prentkovskis, Olegas; Yatskiv (Jackiva), Irina; Skačkauskas, Paulius; Junevičius, Raimundas; Maruschak, Pavlo (eds.). TRANSBALTICA XII: Transportation Science and Technology: Proceedings of the 12th International Conference TRANSBALTICA, September 16-17, 2021, Vilnius, Lithuania. Springer Nature. pp. 456–467. ISBN 978-3-030-94774-3.
- Novakovska, Iryna (10 August 2024). "Ecology and Mobility: Transportation Strategy as a Key to Sustainable Urban Development". In Alareeni, Bahaaeddin; Hamdan, Allam (eds.). Navigating the Technological Tide: The Evolution and Challenges of Business Model Innovation: Proceedings of the International Conference on Business and Technology (ICBT2024), Volume 1. Springer Nature. pp. 206–215. ISBN 978-3-031-67444-0.
