= Romana Shukhevycha (Kyiv Light Rail) =

Kyiv Light Rail station

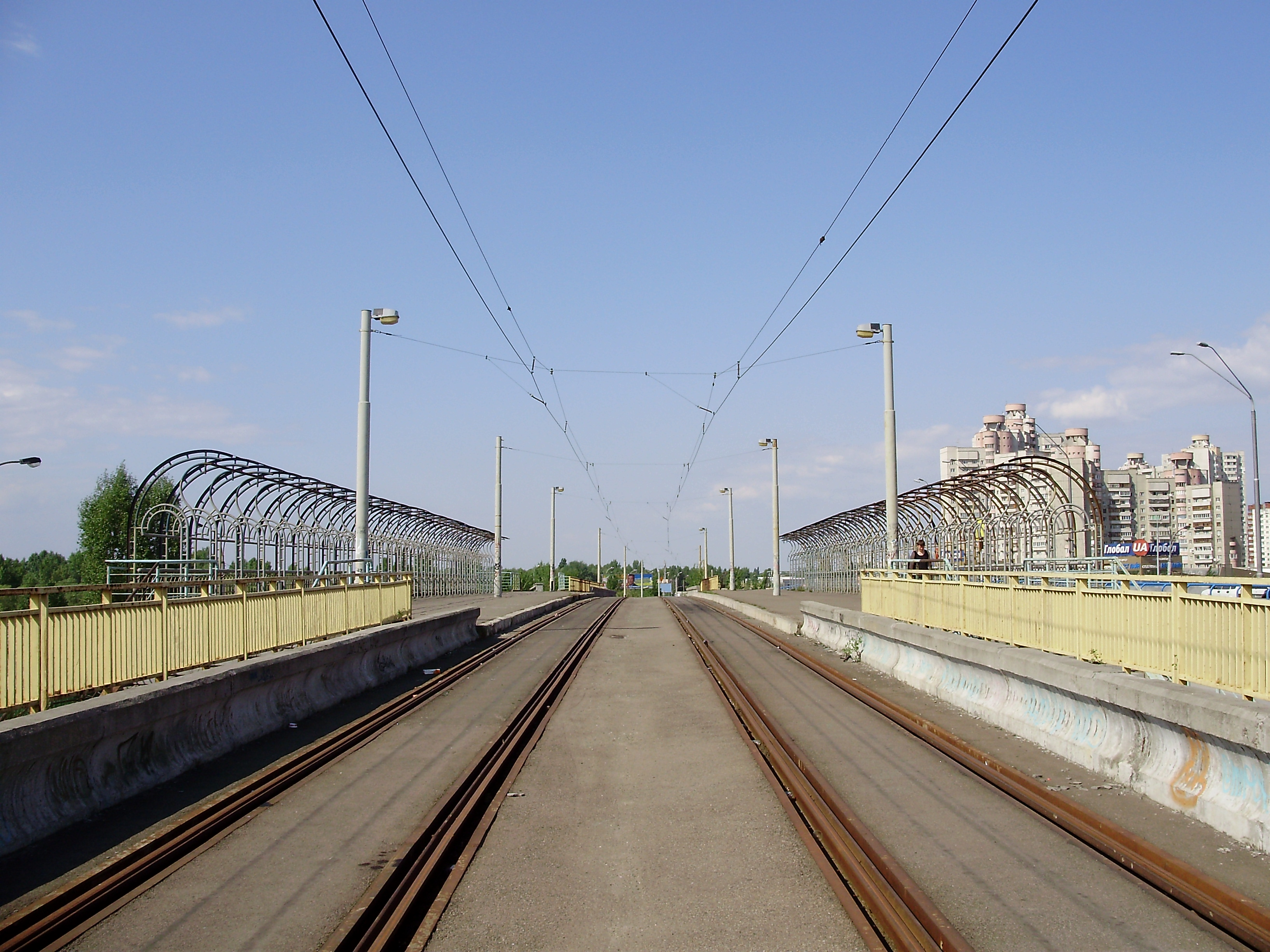

General information
- Coordinates: 50°29′45″N 30°34′28″E
- Owner: Kyivpastrans
- Line: Livoberezhna line
- Platforms: 2 side platforms

History
- Opened: May 26, 2000
- Rebuilt: October 25, 2012

Services
Preceding station	Kyiv Light Rail	Following station
Raiduzhnyi Terminus	Line 4	Kashtanova towards Myloslavska
Raiduzhnyi Terminus	Line 5	Kashtanova towards Serzha Lyfaria Street
Location

Romana Shukhevycha (Ukrainian: Романа Шухевича; from 2000 to 2008, Vatutina; from 2008 to 2022, Henerala Vatutina) is a station on the Livoberezhna Line of the Kyiv Light Rail system. It was opened on May 26, 2000 and reopened after a significant modernization of the line on October 26, 2012.

Romana Shukhevycha is located in between the Kashtanova and Raiduzhnyi stations. It was previously named in honor of General Nikolai Vatutin, a Soviet military commander during World War II. On January 4, 2022, it was renamed in honor of Roman Shukhevych, a military leader of the Ukrainian Insurgent Army and Nazi collaborator.

At one point the Kyiv City authorities proposed creating the Prospekt Vatutina station of the Kyiv Metro's Livoberezhna Line, although that entire project was scrapped in favor of expanding the existing light rail system.
