= Line 5 =

Line 5 may refer to:

== Public transport ==
=== Asia ===
==== Bangladesh ====
- MRT Line 5 (Dhaka Metro Rail)

==== China ====
- Line 5 (Beijing Subway)
- Line 5 (Changsha Metro)
- Line 5 (Chengdu Metro)
- Line 5 (Chongqing Rail Transit)
- Line 5 (Dalian Metro)
- Line 5 (Fuzhou Metro)
- Line 5 (Guangzhou Metro)
- Line 5 (Hangzhou Metro)
- Line 5 (Hefei Metro)
- Line 5 (Kunming Metro)
- Line 5 (Nanning Metro)
- Line 5 (Ningbo Rail Transit)
- Line 5 (Shanghai Metro)
- Line 5 (Shenzhen Metro)
- Line 5 (Suzhou Metro)
- Line 5 (Tianjin Metro)
- Line 5 (Wuhan Metro)
- Line 5 (Xi'an Metro)
- Line 5 (Zhengzhou Metro)

==== India ====
- Line 5 (Chennai Metro), or Red line, under construction in India
- Line 5 (Delhi Metro), or Green Line
- Line 5 (Mumbai Metro)
- Pink Line (Kolkata Metro)

==== Japan ====
- Sennichimae Line, Osaka
- Tokyo Metro Tozai Line

==== Other Asian countries ====
- Tehran Metro Line 5, Iran
- Kelana Jaya line, Kuala Lumpur, Malaysia
- Makati Intra-city Subway, Makati, Philippines (under construction)
- Line 5 (Riyadh Metro), Saudi Arabia
- Seoul Subway Line 5, South Korea
- Bannan line, Taipei, Taiwan

=== Australia ===
- T5 Cumberland Line, Sydney Train service

=== Europe ===
==== France ====
- Île-de-France tramway Line 5
- Paris Metro Line 5

==== Italy ====
- Circumflegrea railway, Naples
- Milan Metro Line 5

==== Russia ====
- Koltsevaya line, Moscow
- Line 5 (Saint Petersburg Metro)

==== Spain ====
- Barcelona Metro line 5, Spain
- Line 5 (Madrid Metro), Spain
- Line 5 (Bilbao Metro), Spain (under study)

==== Other European countries ====
- U5 (Vienna U-Bahn), Austria (planned)
- Brussels Metro line 5, Belgium
- U5 (Berlin U-Bahn), Germany
- Metro Line M5 (Budapest Metro), Hungary
- Tramlijn 5, Amsterdam), Netherlands
- Bucharest Metro Line M5, Romania
- S5 (ZVV), Zurich, Switzerland
- Livoberezhna line (Kyiv Metro), Ukraine (rejected)
- Vyshhorodsko–Darnytska line, Kyiv, Ukraine (proposed)

=== North America ===
==== Canada ====
- Line 5 Eglinton, Toronto
- Blue Line (Montreal Metro), also known as Line 5

==== United States ====
- Route 5 (MTA Maryland), a bus route
- 5 (New York City Subway service)
- 5 (Los Angeles Railway) (defunct)

==== Other North American countries ====
- Line 5, on the Havana Suburban Railway, Cuba
- Mexico City Metro Line 5, Mexico
- Mexico City Metrobús Line 5, a bus rapid transit line in Mexico City
- Line 5 (Panama Metro) (planned)

=== South America ===
- Line 5 (São Paulo Metro), Brazil
- Santiago Metro Line 5, Chile
- Lima Metro, Peru (planned)

== Other uses ==
- Enbridge Line 5, a Canadian oil pipeline
- Regiment Liberation - 5th of the Line, a Belgium line infantry regiment

== See also ==
- List of public transport routes numbered 5
