= Oleksandry Ekster (Kyiv Light Rail) =

Kyiv Light Rail station

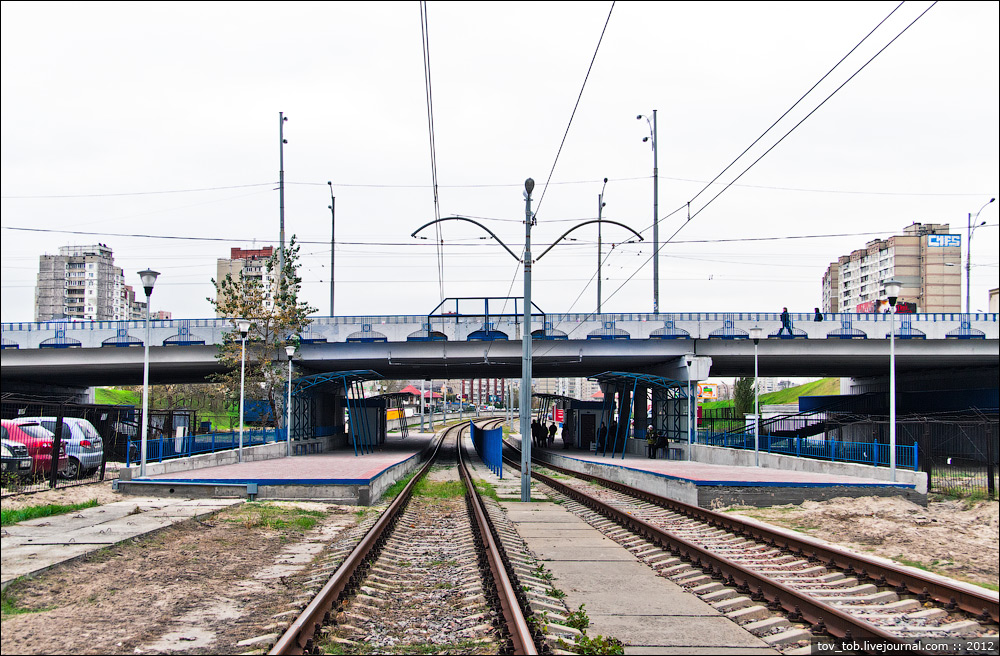

General information
- Coordinates: 50.5237°N 30.6087°E
- Owner: Kyivpastrans
- Line: Livoberezhna line
- Platforms: 2 side platforms

History
- Opened: May 26, 2000
- Rebuilt: October 25, 2012

Services
Preceding station	Kyiv Light Rail	Following station
Serzha Lyfaria towards Raiduzhnyi	Line 4	Myloslavska Terminus
Serzha Lyfaria towards Raiduzhnyi	Line 5	Myloslavska towards Serzha Lyfaria Street
Location

Oleksandry Ekster (Ukrainian: Олександри Екстер; from 2000 to 2008, Tsvietaievoi; from 2008 to 2023, Maryny Tsvietaievoi) is a station on the Livoberezhna Line of the Kyiv Light Rail system in Ukraine. It was opened on May 26, 2000, and reopened after a significant modernization of the line on October 26, 2012.

Oleksandry Ekster is located between the Myloslavska and Serzha Lyfaria stations. Initially named in honour of Marina Tsvetaeva, a Russian poet, but it was renamed in 2023 in honour of Aleksandra Ekster, painter and designer of the Ukrainian avant-garde.

At one point the Kyiv City authorities proposed connecting the station with a prospective station of the Kyiv Metro's Livoberezhna Line, although that entire project was scrapped in favor of expanding the existing light rail system.
