= Desnianskyi District, Kyiv =

Desnianskyi District Деснянський район
- Urban district in Kyiv
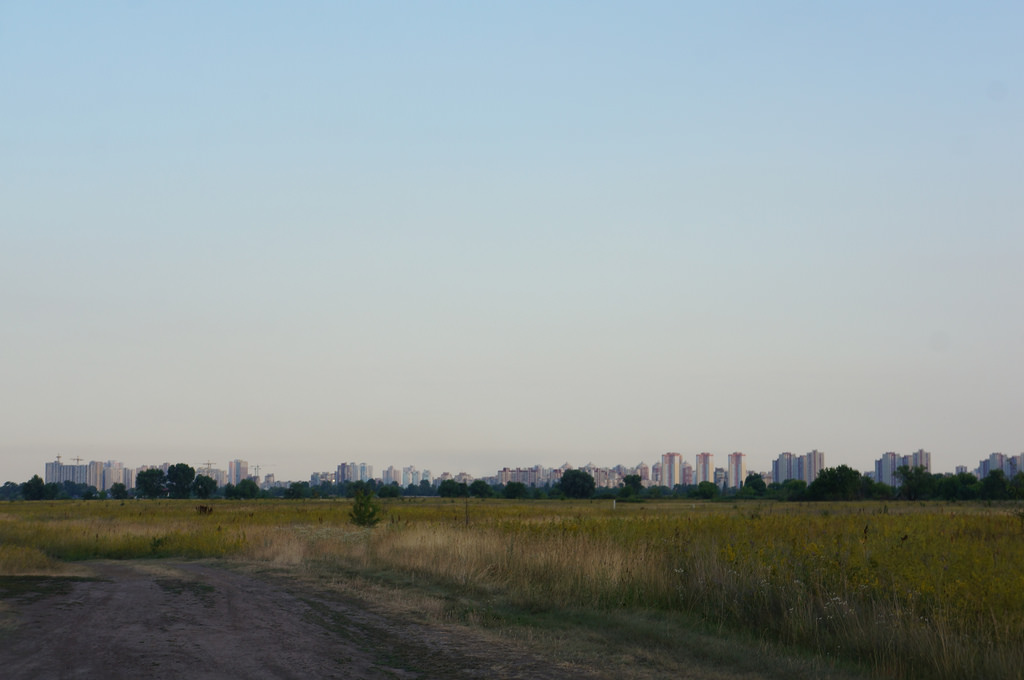
- Desniansky District as seen from the northern outskirts of Kyiv

- Flag Coat of arms

- Interactive map of Desnianskyi District
- Coordinates: 50°31′48″N 30°42′15″E
- Country: Ukraine
- Region: Kyiv
- Established: 30 December 1987 as Vatutynskyi
- Renamed: 2001
- Townhall: Chervonoyi Kalyny Prospect, 29

Government
  - Head: Maksym Bakhmatov

Area
  - Total: 142 km^{2} (55 sq mi)

Population (1 January 2021)
  - Total: 368 500
  - Density: 2.59/km^{2} (6.71/sq mi)
- Time zone: UTC+2 (EET)
  - Summer (DST): UTC+3 (EEST)
- Area code: 38044
- Website: https://desn.kyivcity.gov.ua

The Desnianskyi District (Note: Ukrainian: Деснянський район, romanized: Desnianskyi raion, lit. 'District of Desna') is an administrative raion (district or borough) of the city of Kyiv, the capital of Ukraine. It is located in the north-eastern part of the city on the Right Bank (Note: Informally, Kyiv is subdivided into the Right Bank (Ukrainian: Правий Берег) and the Left bank (Ukrainian: Лівий Берег) on the west and east bank of the Dnieper river respectively.) of the Dnieper River and is the most populous district of Kyiv. It is also the second largest district, with the total area of ca. 14.2 ha.

The Desnianskyi District mainly consists of two microdistricts – Vyhurivshchyna-Troieshchyna and Lisovyi – making it predominantly residential in nature. There is only one clear-cut, (yet small) industrial zone called Kulykove on the border with Dniprovskyi Raion. This fact explains why the district has the lowest number of registered business entities among Kyiv raions. Much like commuter town, therefore, Desnianskyi District has very little commercial or industrial activity beyond a small amount of retail, oriented toward serving the locals. However, it differs from commuter towns in that it forms part of the city proper and is not regarded as suburb in a classical sense. Still, its currently weak transportation links with the major part of the city on the Right Bank make it appear as a "city inside a city", which is especially true for Troieshchyna microdistrict.

== History ==
Since 1151, the area has been known as Myloslavychi, mentioned in the Hypatian Chronicles. Some sources mentioned that as early as 1026, in that area existed a princely residence "Radosyn" belonging to Yuriy Dolgoruki. Sometime in the 15th century, the Kyivan prince Simeon Olelkovych built his castle in the Myloslavychi area.

In 1607, the Polish King Sigismund III granted Myloslavychi to Stanislav Vygur (Векгур), the *horodnychyi* (aedile) of Kyiv, who worked for the Kyiv voivode Konstanty Wasyl Ostrogski. On the site of the settlement that had been burned down, he established a small hamlet. From that time on, these lands came to be known as Vygurivshchyna, often spelled Vyhurivshchyna. Stanislav Vygur eventually donated his estate to the St. Michael Monastery of Kyiv, which was legally verified by a universal of Bohdan Khmelnytsky in 1654.

Sometime in 1667, the first mention of the Troyeshchyna settlement appeared. It belonged to the St. Nicholas Infirmary Monastery, also known as the Trinity (Mykilskyi) Hospital Monastery, hence the settlement's name. The monastery itself is an ancient monastic complex located within the grounds of the Kyiv-Pechersk Lavra.

From 1802 to 1902, the area was part of the Brovary volost and, from 1903 to 1923, the Mykilska Slobidka volost, both in Oster county (uezd) of the Chernigov Governorate. With the creation of raions in 1923, Oster county became Oster Raion. In 1927, the area was transferred to the Kyiv city municipality.

It was not until 1987 that the area was reorganized into a separate raion, partially out of the neighboring Dnipro Raion, and was named after the Soviet military commander Nikolai Vatutin, a native of Russia. Upon its formation, the raion included a couple of residential areas like "Lisovyi masyv" and "Vyhyrivshchyna-Troyeshchyna", the Darnytsia industrial area, low-rise residential micro-districts Troyeshchyna, Bykivnia, settlement Rybne, and an area known as Kulykove pole.

In October 2001, it was renamed Desnianskyi.

=== Vyhurivshchyna-Troieshchyna ===
Residential development of what would become known as Troieshchyna microdistrict started in 1966. However, it was not until the completion of Pivnichnyi Bridge (named Moskovskyi Bridge until 2018) in 1976 that the development became genuinely large-scale.

== Population ==
=== Language ===
Distribution of the population by native language according to the 2001 census:

Language	Number	Percentage
Ukrainian	250 165	74.74%
Russian	78 386	23.42%
Other (Note: Those who did not indicate their native language or indicated a language that was native to less than 1% of the local population.)	6 153	1.84%
Total	334 704	100.00%

== Gallery ==
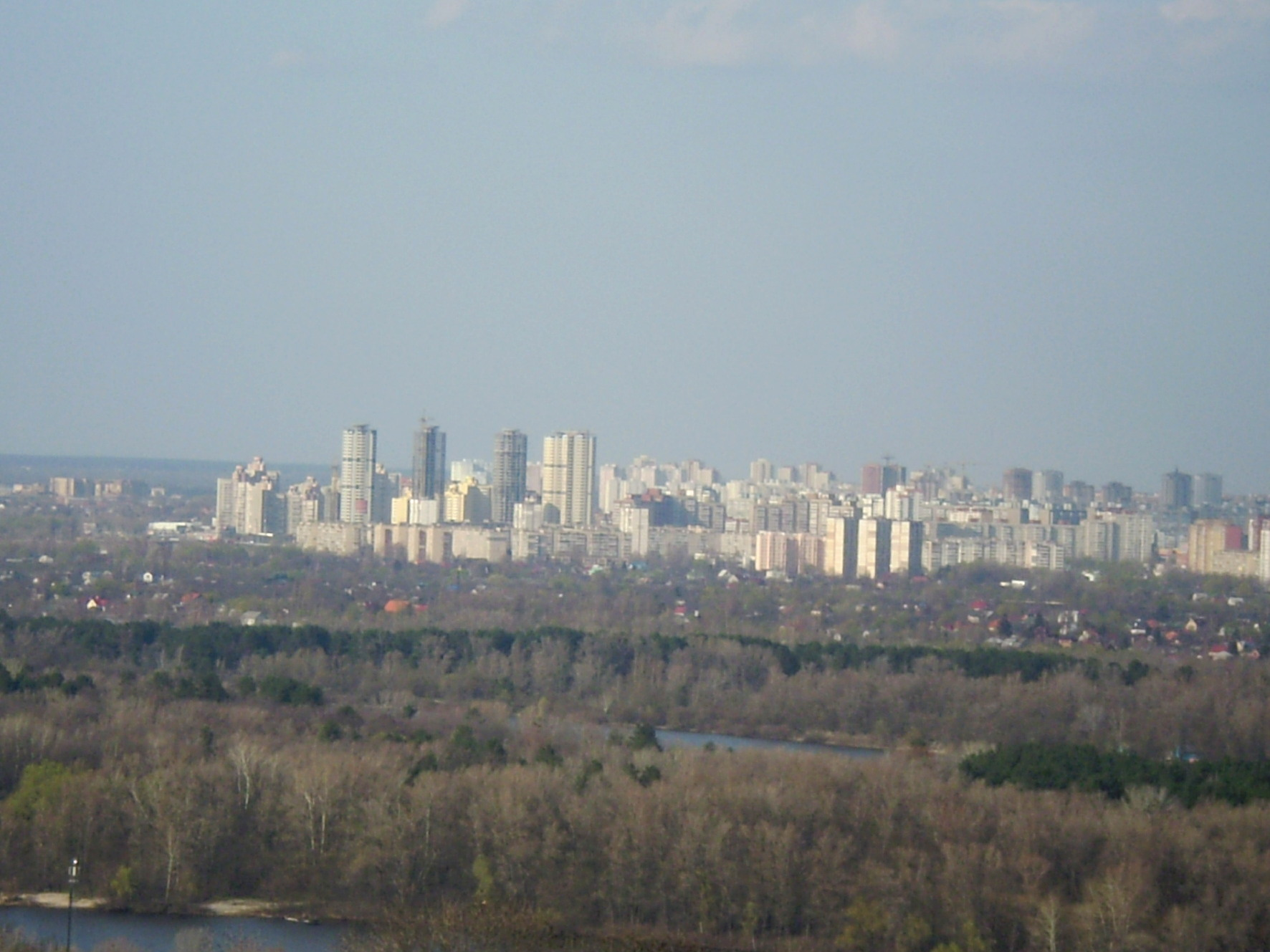
Troieshchyna microdistrict

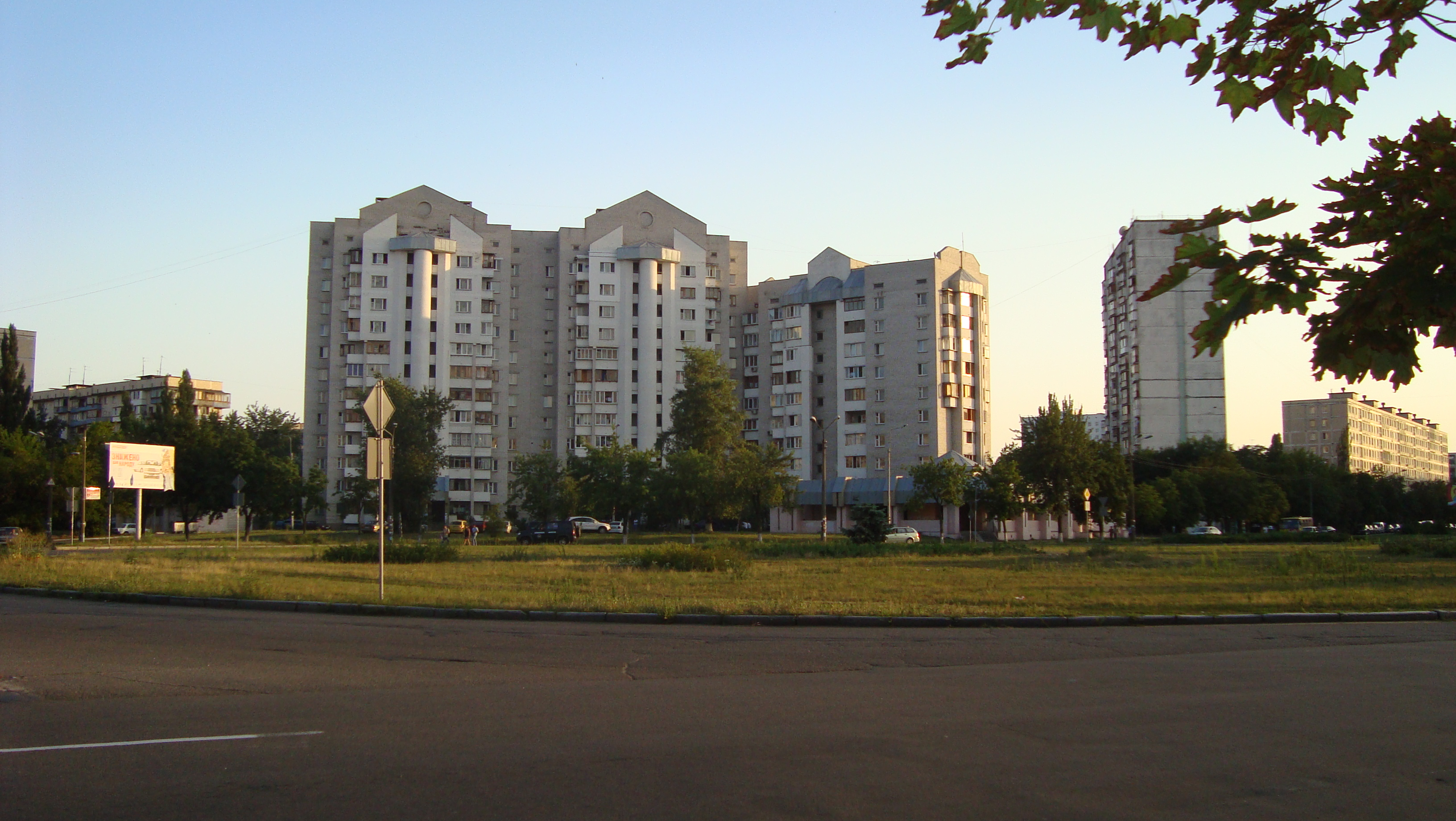
Konotop Battle Square – the centre of Lisovyi microdistrict

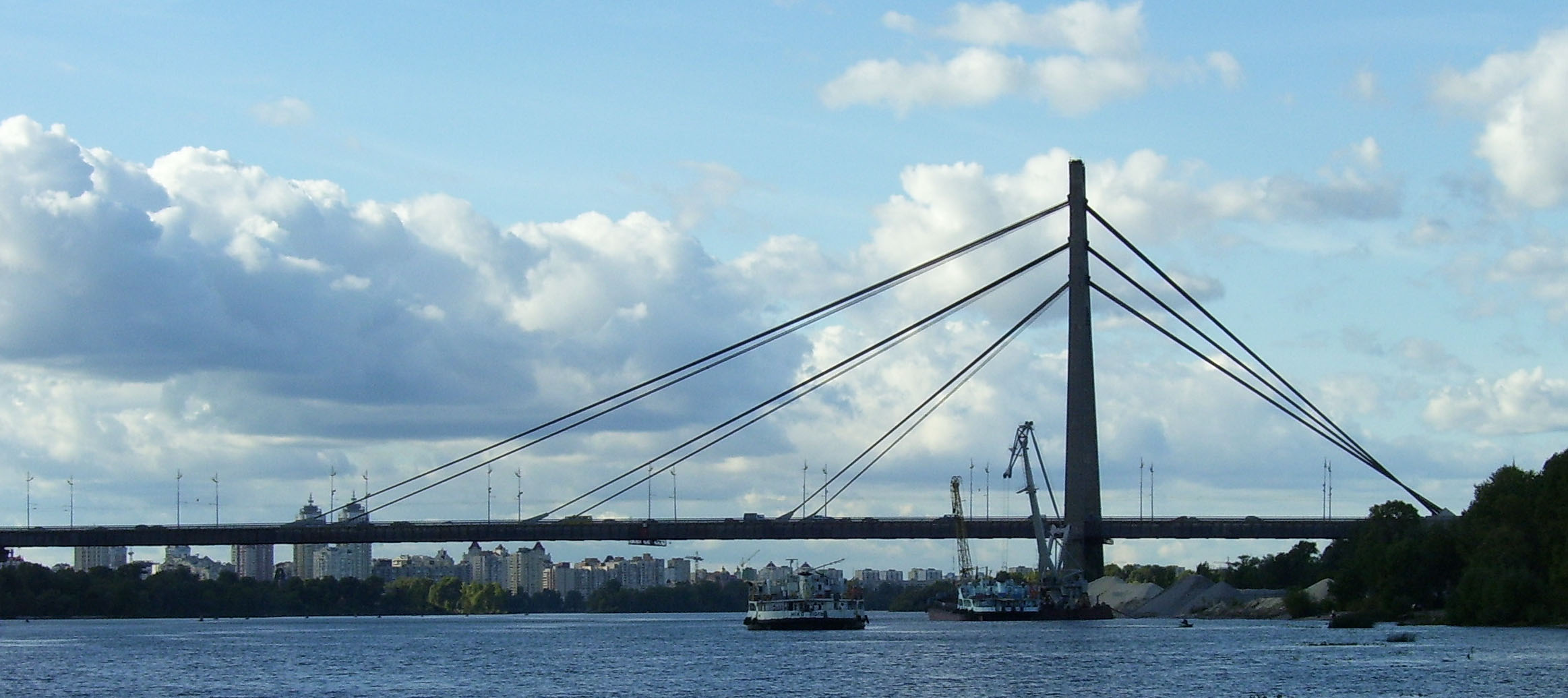
Pivnichnyi Bridge – the key transportation link connecting Desnianskyi District with the rest of the city on west bank of the Dnieper

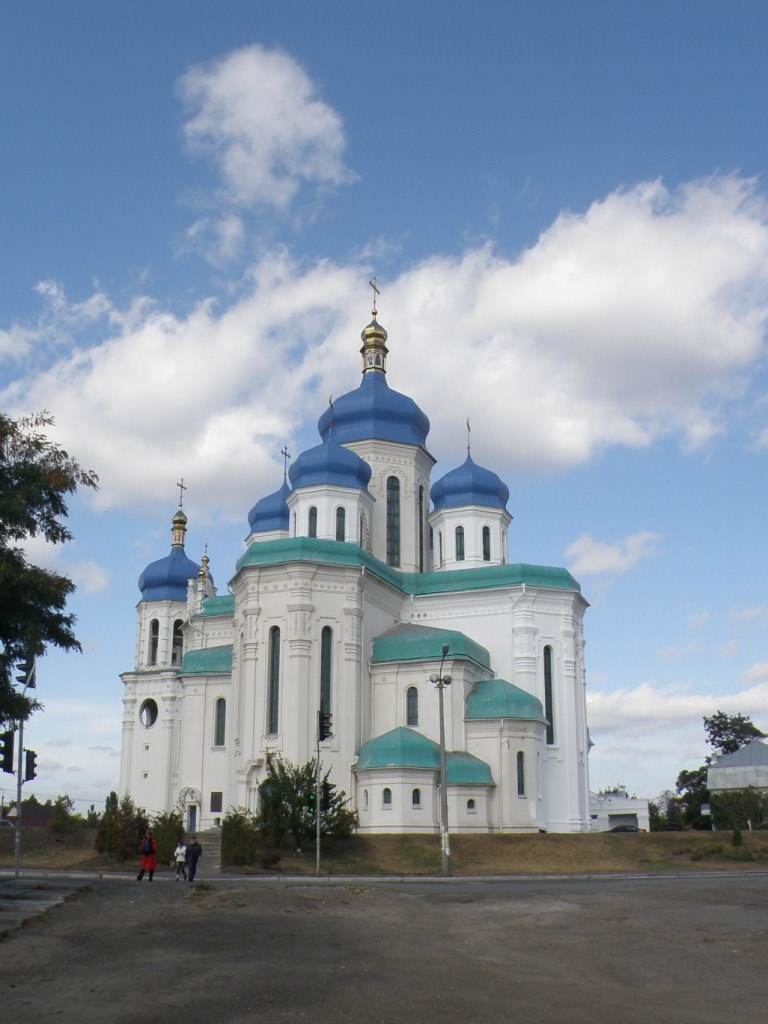
Cathedral of the Holy Trinity in Troieshchyna microdistrict

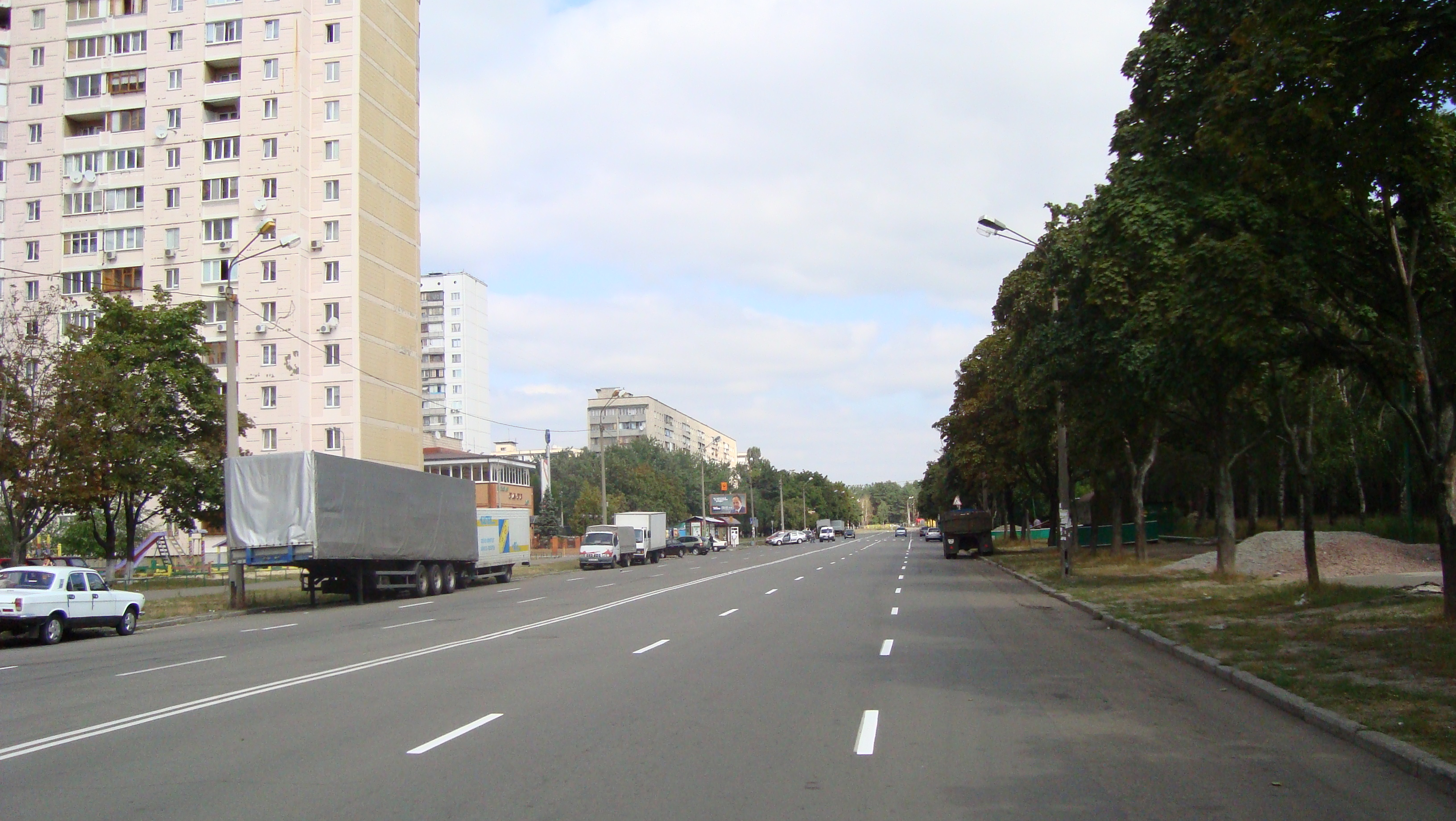
Lisovyi avenue in Kyiv

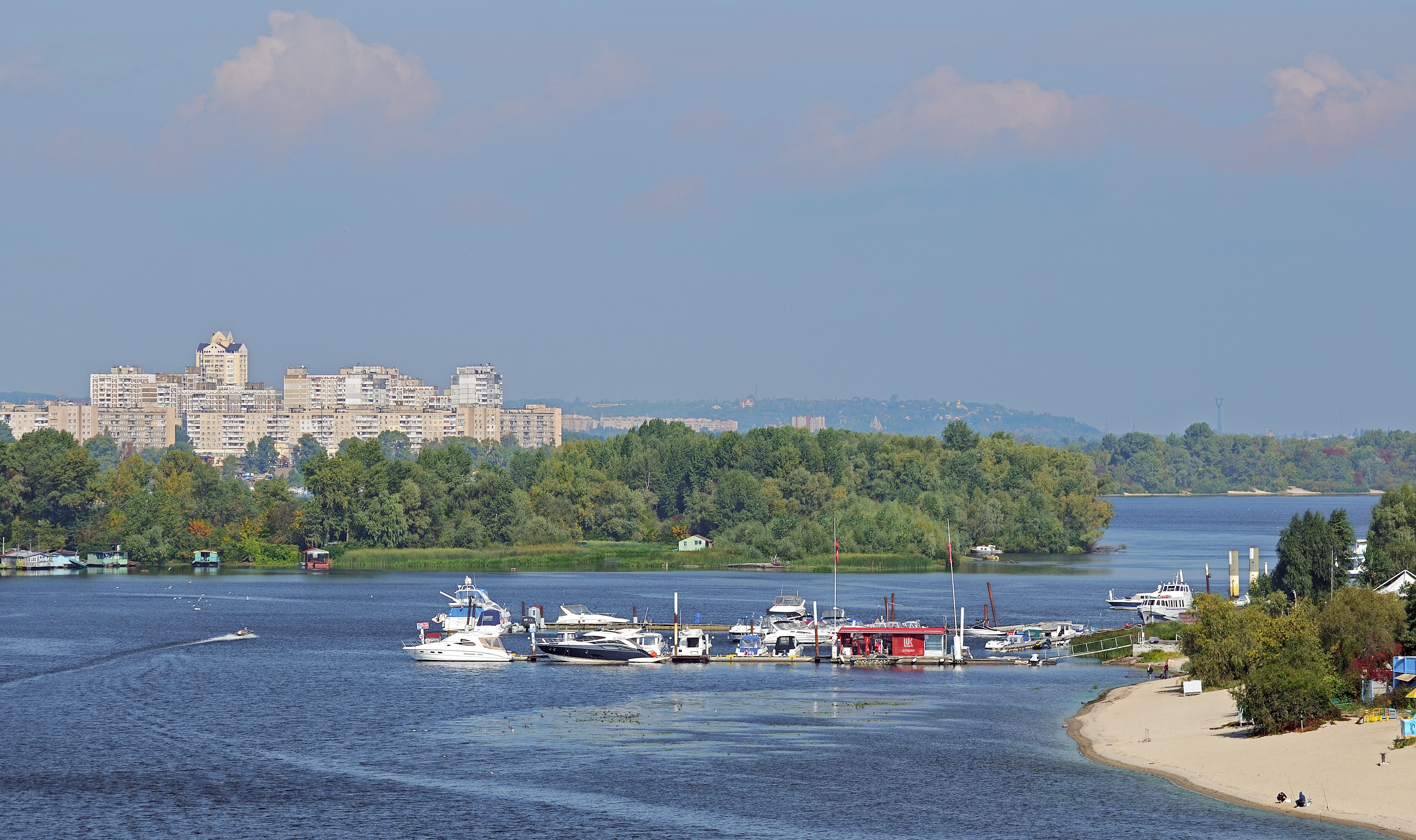
Pier near the park Muromets
