= 5 Train =

5 Train may refer to:

- 5 (New York City Subway service)
- Blue Line (Montreal Metro), also known as Line 5
- Line 5 (Beijing Subway)
- Line 5 (Shanghai Metro)
- Paris Metro Line 5

== See also ==
- Line 5 (disambiguation)
