= Livoberezhna line (Kyiv Light Rail) =

Kyiv Light Rail line

Livoberezhna Line
- 4 5 The 4 and 5 trams run along the entirety of the Livoberezhna Line

Overview
- Locale: Kyiv, Ukraine
- Termini: Myloslavska; Troieschyna-2
- Stations: 7

Service
- Type: Rapid transit
- System: Kyiv Light Rail
- Operator(s): Kyivpastrans

History
- Opened: May 26, 2000

Technical
- Line length: 13.2 km (8.2 mi)
- Track gauge: 1,524 mm (5 ft)

The Livoberezhna Line is the second line of the Kyiv Light Rail, located in the eastern part of Kyiv. Opened in 2000, the light rail corridor underwent several renovations in 2010 and reopened in 2012 for regular service. The Livoberezhna Line connects the Troieshchyna urban rail station with Vygurivshchyna and central Troieshchyna. The 4 and 5 trams both run along the Livoberezhna Line.

At one point, the Kyiv City Administration proposed extending the Kyiv Metro system to Troieschyna by creating the Livoberezhna Line, although this proposal was scrapped in 2014 in favor of keeping the light rail system.

== List of stations ==
The Livoberezhna Line consists of a total of seven full stations, served by routes No 4 and No 5. It contains a total of 13.2 kilometres (8.2 mi) of track. The line is serviced by the Darnytsia tram depot. Here is a full list of stations on the line:

Station	Transfers	Notes
Serzha Lyfaria Street	5	
Volodymyra Vysotskoho	5	
Leonida Bykova	5	
Poliklinika	5	
Sotszabezpechennia	5	
RPS	5	
Mikroraion No. 20	5	
Litsei No. 293	5	
Khram na Chest Ikony Bozhoi Materi "Vsetrarytsia"	5	
Myloslavska Street	5	
Myloslavska	4 5	
Oleksandry Ekster	4 5	From 2000 to 2008 the station was called Tsvetaievoi; from 2008 to 2022 the station was called Maryny Tsvetaievoi.
Serzha Lyfaria	4 5	From 2000 to 2008 the station was called Saburova; from 2008 to 2022 the station was called Oleksandra Saburova.
Ronalda Reihana	4 5	From 2000 to 2008 the station was called Draizera; from 2008 to 2024 the station was called Teodora Draizera.
Kashtanova	4 5	
Romana Shukhevycha	4 5	From 2000 to 2008 the station was called Vatutina; from 2008 to 2022 the station was called Henerala Vatutina.
Raiduzhnyi	4 5	Opened on October 25, 2012. From 2000 to 2024 the station was called Troieshchyna-2.
