= Kiltseva Road =

Street in Solomianka Raion, Kyiv, Ukraine

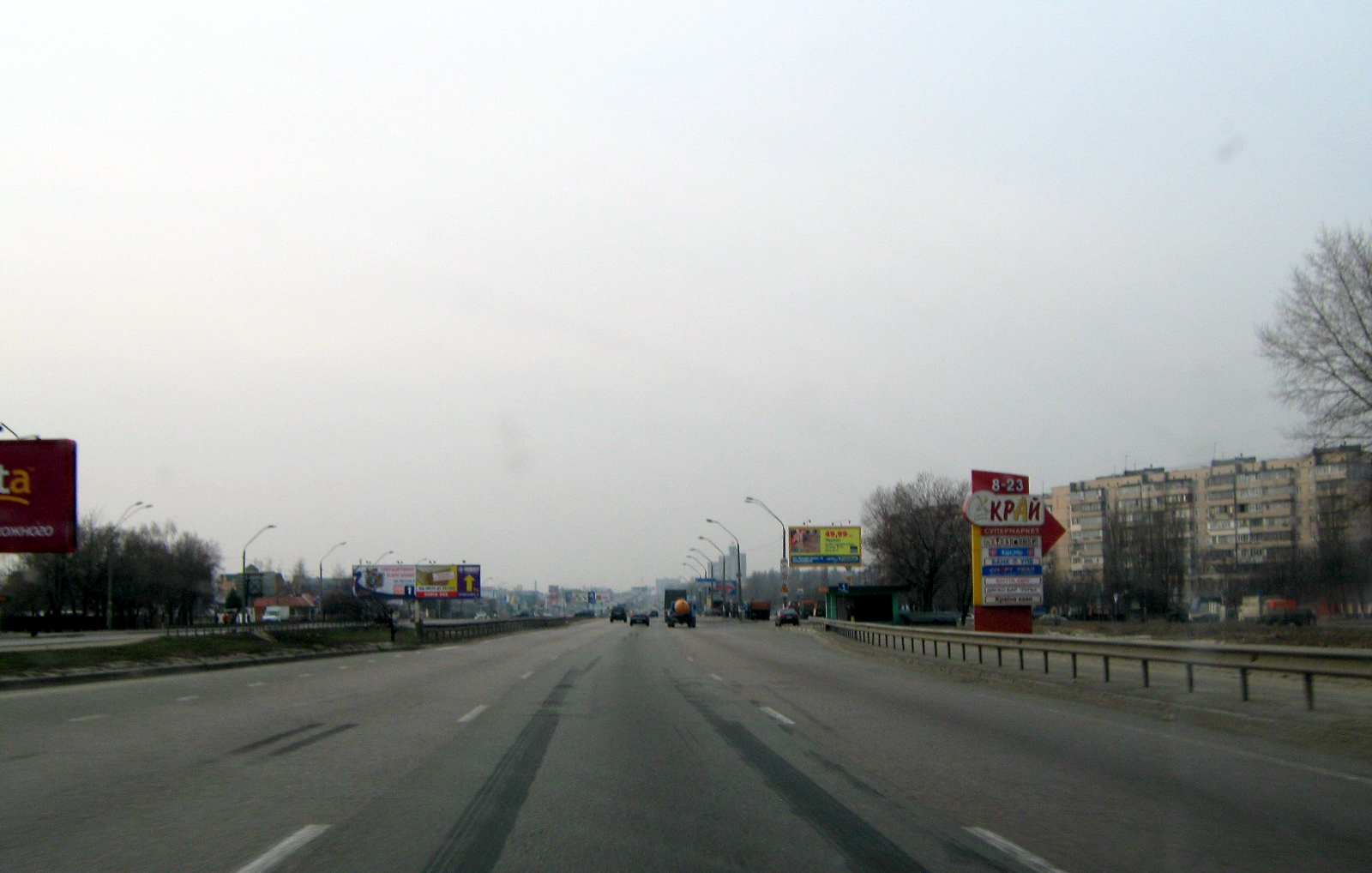
- Native name: Кільцева дорога (Ukrainian)
- Length: 12.6 km (7.8 mi)
- Location: Kyiv, Ukraine
- Postal code: 03115, 03134, 03170, 03187, 03680

Kiltseva Road (Ukrainian: Кільцева дорога, Kiltseva doroha) is a street and the city bypass route in the Sviatoshynskyi, Solomianskyi and Holosiivskyi District of Kyiv, Ukraine. It is a less than a quarter of a round segment on the western outskirts of Kyiv, running along the city's administrative border beginning from Odesa Square in the south where it intersects with the M05 highway and terminating at an intersection with the M06 highway and Prospect Peremohy in the north. The road serves as the western bypass of Kyiv, forming the central part of a beltway called the Great Beltway, which as of 2022 covers the part of the city on the right bank of the Dnipro river.

The road is designated as local road T-10-27, and forms a part of European route E40.

== History ==
Kiltseva Road originated in the first half of the 20th century. It was called Okruzhna [Circuit] Street, and from 1965 to 1977 it was called the Velyka Okruzhna [Great Circuit] Road. In 1977, it was connected to Velyka Okruzhna [Great Circuit] Street in Sviatoshyn (it appeared at the turn of the 19th-20th centuries, until 1965 it was called the 4th Prosika, stretched from Peremohy Avenue to the end of the building near Mykhailo Kotelnikova Street).

Kiltseva Road is the namesake of Kyiv Light Rail station Kiltseva Doroha, closed for reconstruction since 2018.

== Notable addresses ==
- Elektronmash factory
- State Research Forensic Centre (Ministry of Interior)
