= Anatoly Dobrovolsky =

Soviet-Ukrainian architect (1910-1988)

Anatoly Volodymyrovych Dobrovolsky
- Анато́лій Володи́мирович Доброво́льський
- Born: 19 May 1910; Buki, Zhitomirsky Uyezd, Volhynia Governorate, Russian Empire
- Died: 19 May 1988 (aged 78); Kyiv, Ukrainian SSR, Soviet Union
- Resting place: Baikove Cemetery; 50°25.00′N 30°30.35′E
- Education: Kyiv National University of Construction and Architecture
- Occupation: Architect
- Years active: 1934-1988
- Projects: Boryspil International Airport; Kyiv-Pasazhyrskyi railway station NASU Institute of Physics; Hotel Ukraine; Khreshchatyk metro station Shuliavska metro station
- Design: Pivnichnyi Bridge

Anatoly Volodymyrovych Dobrovolsky (Ukrainian: Анато́лій Володи́мирович Доброво́льський; 19 May 1910 - 19 May 1988) was a Soviet Ukrainian architect.

== Biography ==
Dobrovolsky was born on 19 May 1910 in the village of Buki, which is near the city of Zhytomyr, and was located in the Volhynia Governorate of the Russian Empire at the time of his birth. In 1934, he obtained his bachelor's degree in civil engineering from the Kyiv National University of Construction and Architecture, where he worked under prominent Ukrainian architects such as Vasyl Krychevsky. After graduating, he worked in the 1st Architectural Workshop of the Kyiv City Executive Committee under Joseph Karakis. During this time, his architectural style when he was developing residential and public buildings, reflected a strong influence of classical and folk traditions from the Ukrainian Baroque, but this gradually transitioned into more monumental forms.

During 1950–1955, he was the Chief Architect of Kyiv, Ukraine.

== Projects ==
- Boryspil International Airport, Ukraine (1964–66).
- Bolshevik factory, Kyiv, Ukraine.
- Khreshchatyk metro station in Kyiv.
