= Pivnichnyi Bridge =

Pivnichnyi Bridge Північний міст
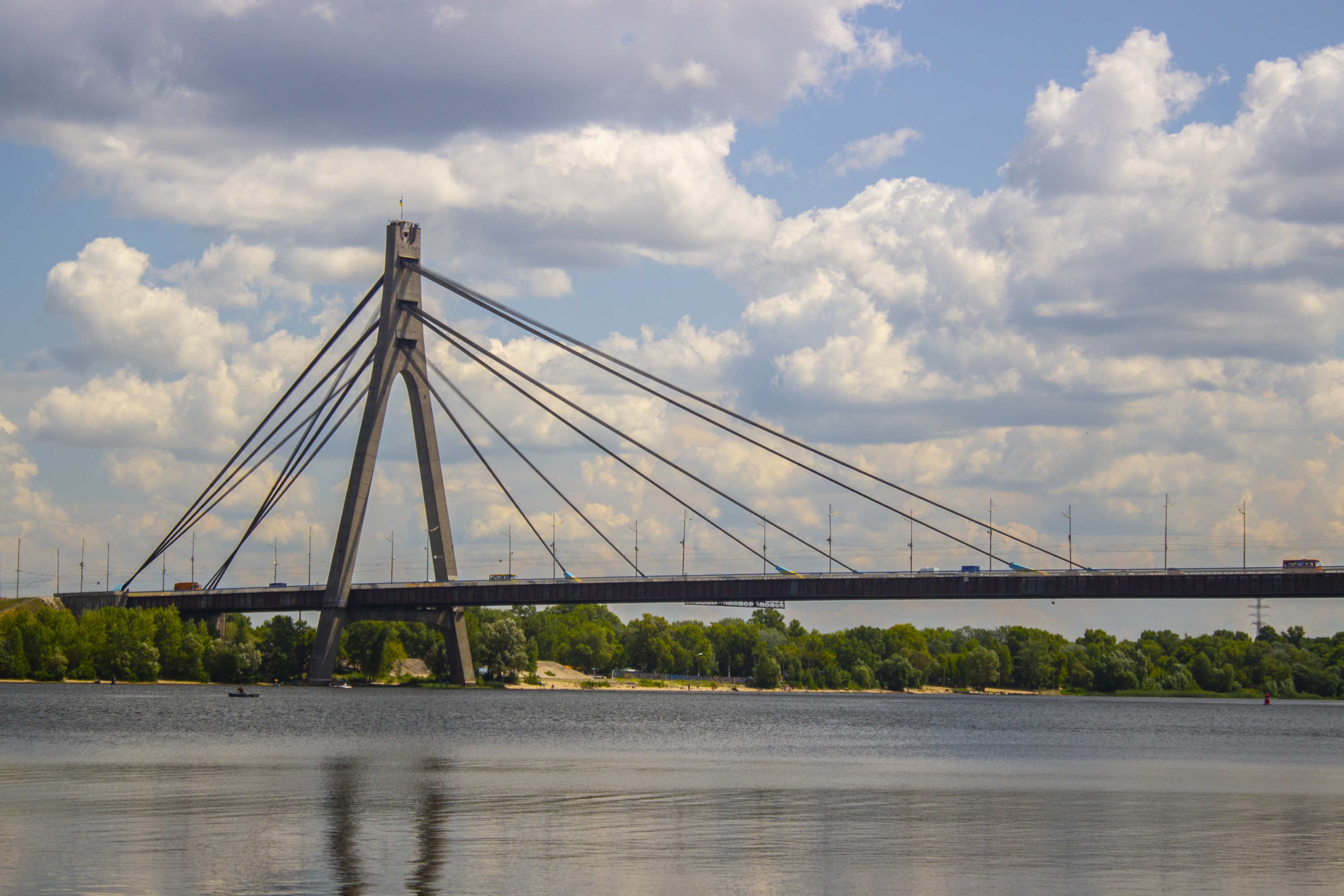
- Pivnichnyi Bridge in 2019
- Coordinates: 50°29′26″N 30°32′09″E
- Carries: Automobiles
- Crosses: Dnieper River
- Locale: Kyiv, Ukraine
- Other name: Moskovskyi Bridge
- Owner: Ukraine
- Followed by: Rybalskyi Railroad Bridge

Characteristics
- Total length: 816 m
- Width: 31.4 m
- Height: 119 m
- Longest span: 300 m

History
- Designer: Mikhail Krasnoshtein; Anatoliy Dobrovolskyi
- Engineering design by: Heorhiy Fuks
- Construction start: 1971; 55 years ago
- Opened: 3 December 1976; 49 years ago

Location
- Interactive map of Pivnichnyi Bridge

The Pivnichnyi Bridge (Ukrainian: Північний міст [piu̯ˈn⁽ʲ⁾itʃnɪj ˈmist]) or Northern Bridge is a cable-stayed bridge in Kyiv, Ukraine, built in 1976. It was designed by the architect Anatoly Dobrovolsky and engineer Georgiy Fuks (G. B. Fuchs). The beam of the main span is held by a cluster of steel ropes which are fixed to a 119 m (390 ft) tall A-pylon. The bridge also acts as a segment of the Small Ring Road of Kyiv.

Until February 2018 the bridge was named Moskovskyi Bridge (Ukrainian: Московський міст, Moskovskyi Mist) or Moscow Bridge. As part of Ukraine's current decommunization process the bridge was nominated to be renamed for almost a year prior to its new name.

== Overview ==
The bridge was designed by Anatoly Dobrovolsky and engineered under lead of engineer Georgiy Fuks/Fuchs, who also designed the Pivdennyi Bridge and Metro Bridge. The major feature of the bridge its 119 m (390 ft) high pylon on Trukhaniv Island, designed by Dobrovolsky.

The bridge is actually a composition of two main bridges: a 816 m (2,677 ft) long and 31.4 m (103 ft) wide across the Dnipro, a 732 m (2,402 ft) long, 29.1 m (95 ft) wide across the Desenka (Desna distributary) and includes a road interchange at Stepana Bandery prospect and Volodymyra Ivasiuka prospect to the north and Naberezhno-Rybalska road to the south.

The bridge opened on 3 December 1976. It is a key structure on the northern end of the Kyiv Smaller Beltway, connecting Petrivka to the densely populated north-eastern residential neighborhoods of Troieshchyna and Voskresenka. From the moment of its construction the bridge was built as a high-speed motorway, which it remains to this day, forming part of the Small Ring Road of Kyiv. It is notorious for frequent accidents and traffic jams.

The Monument to the Founders of Kyiv was originally planned to be placed on the bridge, but this idea was abandoned due to its excessive weight, the sculpture being placed in a nearby park instead. On 17 November 2026, the bridge was damaged by a Russian ballistic missile.

== See also ==
- Bridges in Kyiv
