= List of public transport routes numbered 5 =

In public transport, Route 5 may refer to:

== North America ==
=== Canada ===
- Line 5 Blue (Montreal Metro)

=== United States ===
- 5 (New York City Subway service)
- 5 (New Jersey bus), a New Jersey Transit bus route
- Route 5 (MTA Maryland), a bus route in Baltimore, Maryland
- 5 (Los Angeles Railway), a line operated by the Los Angeles Railway from 1931 to 1958
- 5 Fulton, a bus route in San Francisco

=== Mexico ===
- Mexico City Metro Line 5

== Europe ==
=== Spain ===
- Barcelona Metro line 5
- Line 5 (Madrid Metro)

=== United Kingdom ===
- London Buses route 5

== Asia ==
=== China ===
- Citybus Route 5, a bus route in Hong Kong

=== Malaysia ===
- Kelana Jaya Line, numbered 5 on transit maps

=== South Korea ===
- Seoul Subway Line 5

== Oceania ==
=== Australia ===
- Melbourne tram route 5

== See also ==
- Line 5 (disambiguation)
