= Odesa Square =

Street in Kyiv, Ukraine

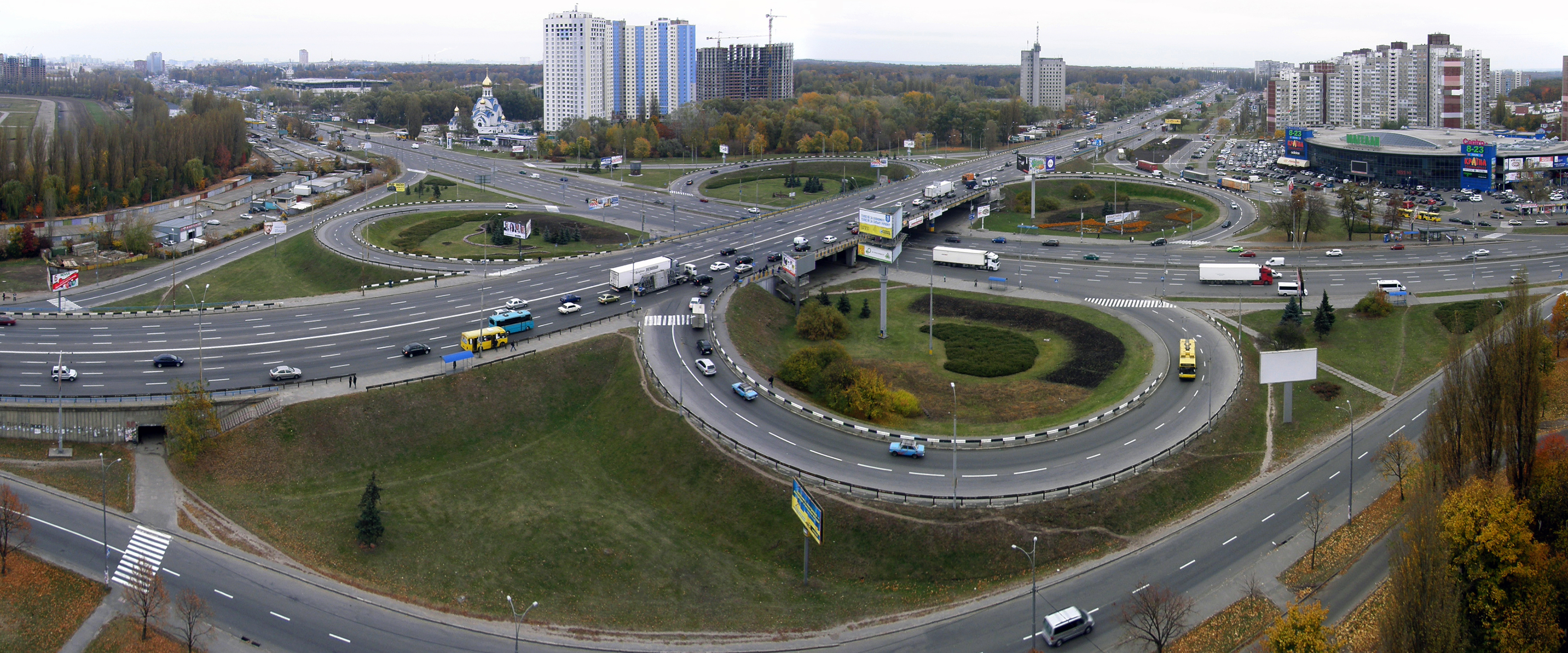
- Odesa Square, October 2014
- Interactive map of Odesa Square
- Native name: Одеська площа (Ukrainian)
- Location: Kyiv, Ukraine
- Nearest metro station: Teremky
- Coordinates: 50°22′12″N 30°27′31″E

The Odesa (or Odeska) Square (Ukrainian: Одеська площа, romanized: Odeska ploshcha, IPA: [oˈdɛsʲkɐ ˈplɔʃtʃɐ]) is one of the squares of Kyiv, Ukraine.

It is located in the neighborhood Teremky in the Holosiiv Raion of Kyiv.

It was named after big Ukrainian city port Odesa.

The square emerged in 1970s with name New (Нова), and in 1976 has received current name.

In fact Kyivan Odesa Square is a big crossroad and transport interchange spot on the way from Kyiv to Odesa, and via Kiltseva Road from south to west of the city, with a scarce public space.

== Sources ==
- Odesa Square on wek.kiev.ua (in Ukrainian)
- Одеська площа // Вулиці Києва. Довідник / за ред. А. В. Кудрицького. — К. : «Українська енциклопедія» ім. М. П. Бажана, 1995. — С. 155. — ISBN 5-88500-070-0. (in Ukrainian)
