= Vyshhorodsko–Darnytska line =

Proposed line of the Kyiv Metro

Overview
- Locale: Kyiv, Ukraine

Service
- Type: Rapid transit
- System: Kyiv Metro

History
- Opened: Under planning

Technical
- Track gauge: 1,520 mm (4 ft 11 27/32 in)

The Vyshhorodsko–Darnytska line (Ukrainian: Вишгородсько–Дарницька лінія, romanized: Vyshhorodsko-Darnytska liniia) is a proposed sixth line to the Kyiv Metro system serving the Ukrainian capital Kyiv. The line is proposed to begin near the Taras Shevchenko Square in the city's north, and is to run south, connecting to the system's four other lines (one of which is currently under construction). It will later run east, and will cross over the Dnipro River and ending at the Darnytsia Railway Station on the city's left bank.

== Planning ==
Talks about the creation of the Vyshhorodsko–Darnytska line as the fifth line addition to the Kyiv Metro first began in March 2012. The deputy chief of planning and architecture of the Kyiv City State Administration Andriy Kudelina stated that the new draft of the city's master plan aims to increase the total length of the metro system from 64 km (40 mi) to 130 km (81 mi) and the number of stations from 50 to 100. The master plan also anticipates the construction of seven new depots, and two new subway lines, including the Vyshhorodsko–Darnytska line and the already under construction Podilsko–Vyhurivska line, with the priority for construction resting on the latter.

In 2013, it became known that the Vyshhorodsko–Darnytska line will be colored yellow on the future metro maps, and will perspectively connect the Minskyi neighborhood, Vitriani Hory, Priorka, Kurenivka, Karavaievi Dachi, Chokolivka, Oleksandrivska Slobidka, and Pozniaky neighborhoods of the city.

== Prospective stations ==
External image
- Perspective map of the metro construction Source: General Planning Institute of the City of Kyiv. Retrieved 22 March 2014

The Vyshhorodsko–Darnytska line's perspective stations will be (listed west to east):

- Ploshcha Tarasa Shevchenka
- Priorka
- Vyshhorodska
- Vulytsia Oleny Telihy
- Dorohozhychi
- Dehtiarivska
- Shuliavska
- Prospekt Kosmonavta Komarova
- Karavaievi Dachi
- Chokolivska
- Prospekt Valeriia Lobanovskoho
- Vulytsia Volodymyra Brozhka
- Hrinchenka
- Lybidska
- Bulvar Mykoly Mikhnovskoho
- Siti-Tsentr
- Rusanivska Naberezhna
- Kyivska Rusanivka
- Darnytska Ploshcha
- Darntyskyi Vokzal

== See also ==
- Livoberezhna line, another proposed fifth line addition to the Kyiv Metro
