= Line 5 (Kunming Metro) =

Metro line in Kunming, China

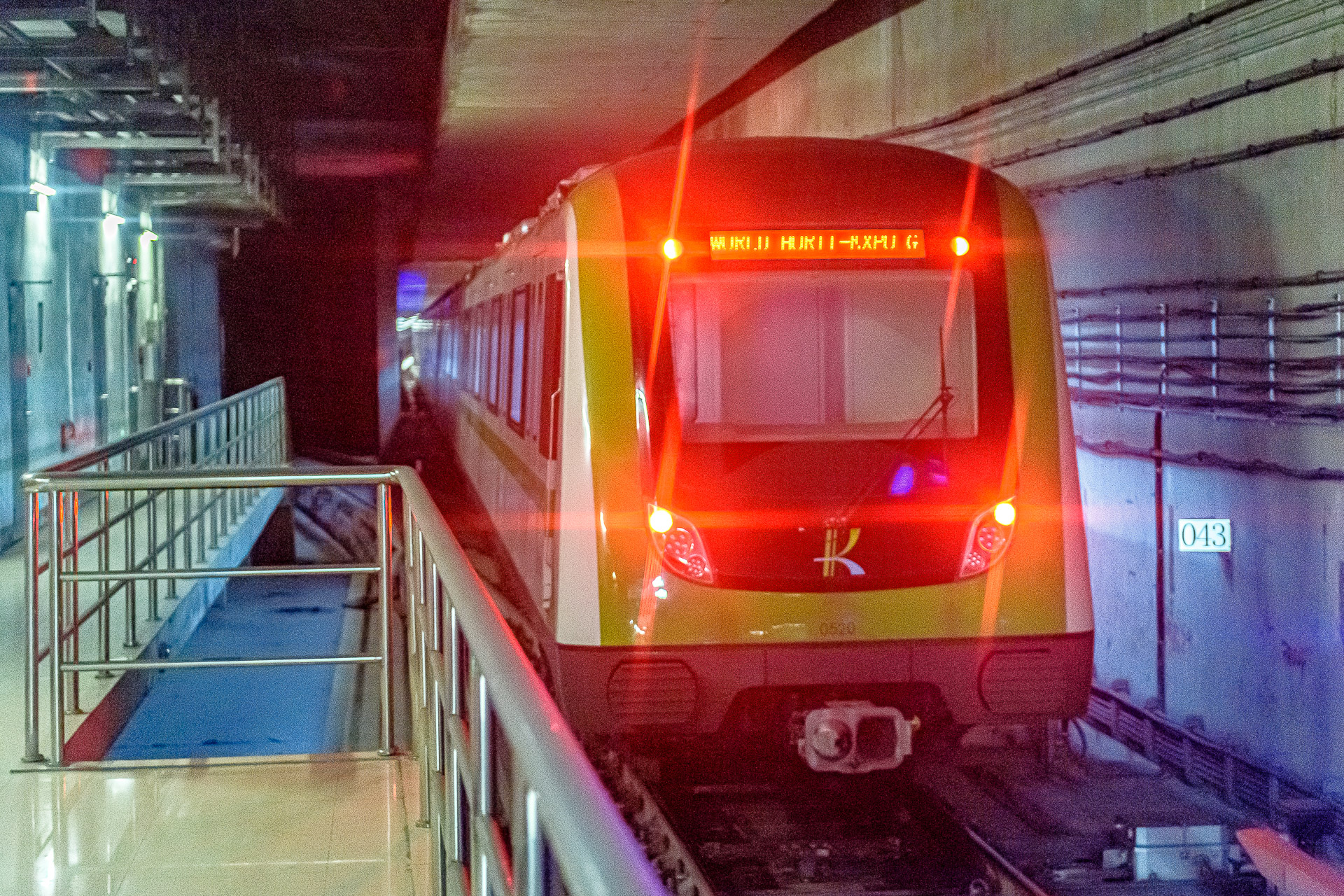
- A Line 5 train leaving North Railway Station

Overview
- Status: In operation
- Locale: Kunming, Yunnan, China
- Termini: World Horti-Expo Garden; Baofeng
- Stations: 22

Service
- Type: Rapid transit
- System: Kunming Metro

History
- Opened: 29 June 2022; 4 years ago

Technical
- Line length: 26.45 km (16.4 mi)
- Num of tracks: 2
- Track gauge: 1,435 mm (4 ft 8 1/2 in)

Line 5 is a rapid transit line of the Kunming Metro, serving the city of Kunming, Yunnan Province, China. The line has a total length of 26.45 km (16.4 mi) and 22 stations. Phase 1 of the line was opened on 29 June 2022.

== History ==
Construction began in June 2016. The line is constructed by a consortium consisting of China Railway Construction Corp, Fourth Railway Research Institute Investment Co, and Kunming Railway Group.

== Opening timeline ==
Segment	Commencement	Length	Station(s)	Name
World Horti-Expo Garden — Baofeng	29 June 2022	26.45 km (16.4 mi)	22	Phase 1

== Rolling stock ==
The line is operated using six-car Type B trainsets manufactured by CRRC, with a maximum speed of 80 km/h and a capacity for 2094 passengers.

== Stations ==
Station Name		Connections	Distance km	Location
English	Chinese	Connections	Distance km	Location
World Horti-Expo Garden	世博园			Panlong
Bailongsi	白龙寺			Panlong
Shizha	石闸			Panlong
Chuanjin Road	穿金路			Panlong
North Railway Station	火车北站	2 4 KBM		Panlong
Yuantong Hill	圆通山			Wuhua
Huashan West Road	华山西路			Wuhua
Wuyi Road	五一路	3		Wuhua
Milesi	弥勒寺	1		Xishan
Yanjiadi	严家地			Xishan
Jinlan Road	金兰路			Xishan
Fuhai	福海			Xishan
Guangfulu Xikou	广福路西口			Xishan
Daba	大坝			Xishan
Yinghai Road	迎海路			Xishan
Yuhucun	渔户村			Xishan
Xingti Road	兴体路			Xishan
Zhuangjiatang Overpass	庄家塘立交桥			Xishan
Jinjia River	金家河			Xishan
Fubao	福保			Guandu
Dianchi International Convention and Exhibition Center	滇池国际会展中心	2		Guandu
Baofeng	宝丰	2		Guandu
