= Raiduzhnyi (Kyiv Light Rail) =

Kyiv Light Rail station

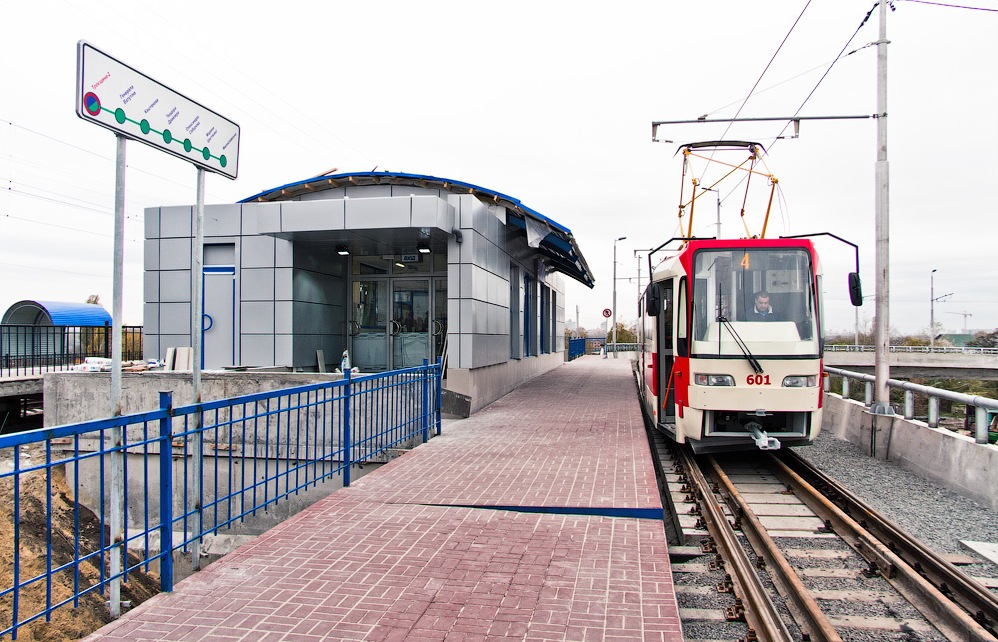

General information
- Coordinates: 50.4833°N 30.5737°E
- Owner: Kyivpastrans
- Line: Livoberezhna line
- Platforms: 1 side platform

History
- Opened: October 25, 2012
- Former names: Troieshchyna-2

Services
Preceding station	Kyiv Light Rail	Following station
Terminus	Line 4	Romana Shukhevycha towards Myloslavska
Terminus	Line 5	Romana Shukhevycha towards Serzha Lyfaria Street
Location

Raiduzhnyi (Ukrainian: Райдужний; before 2024, Troieshchyna-2) is a station on the Livoberezhna Line of the Kyiv Light Rail system. It was opened on October 26, 2012.

Raiduzhnyi is a terminus station located after the Romana Shukhevycha station. It is directly connected to the Kyiv Urban Electric Train's eponymous Troieschyna-2 railway stop, with which it forms a combined transit complex.

9 March 2024 the station was renamed from Troieshchyna-2 to Raiduzhnyi.

The former station's name comes from the neighborhood of Troieshchyna, current name comes from the neighborhood of Raiduzhnyi Masyv.
