= Myloslavska (Kyiv Light Rail) =

Kyiv Light Rail station

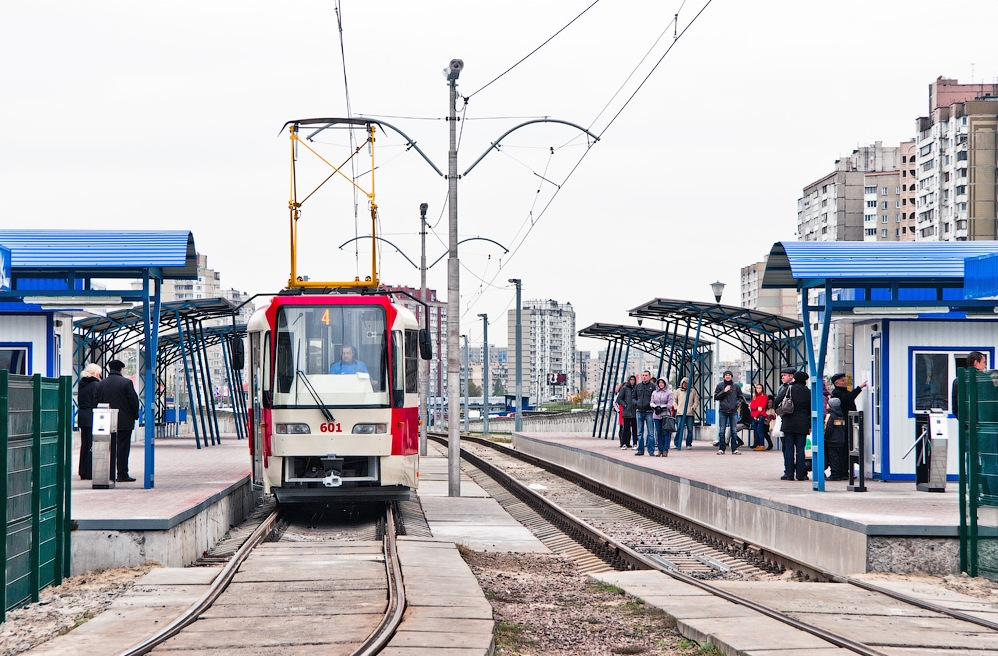

General information
- Coordinates: 50°31′52″N 30°37′00″E
- Owner: Kyivpastrans
- Line: Livoberezhna line
- Platforms: 2 side platforms
- Tracks: Loop

History
- Opened: May 26, 2000
- Rebuilt: October 25, 2012

Services
Preceding station	Kyiv Light Rail	Following station
Oleksandry Ekster towards Raiduzhnyi	Line 4	Terminus
Oleksandry Ekster towards Raiduzhnyi	Line 5	Myloslavska Street towards Serzha Lyfaria Street
Location

Myloslavska (Ukrainian: Милославська) is a station on the Livoberezhna Line of the Kyiv Light Rail system. It was opened on May 26, 2000 and reopened after a significant modernization of the line on October 26, 2012.

Myloslavska is a terminus station of the Livoberezhna Line, and is located right after the Oleksandry Ekster station. It is named after the Myloslavska Street in northeastern Kyiv's Troieshchyna neighborhood.

At one point the Kyiv City authorities proposed creating the Vulytsia Myloslavska station of the Kyiv Metro's Livoberezhna Line, although that entire project was scrapped in favor of expanding the existing light rail system.
