= Vyhurivshchyna-Troieshchyna =

Neighborhood of Kyiv

Coordinates: 50°30′53″N 30°36′5″E

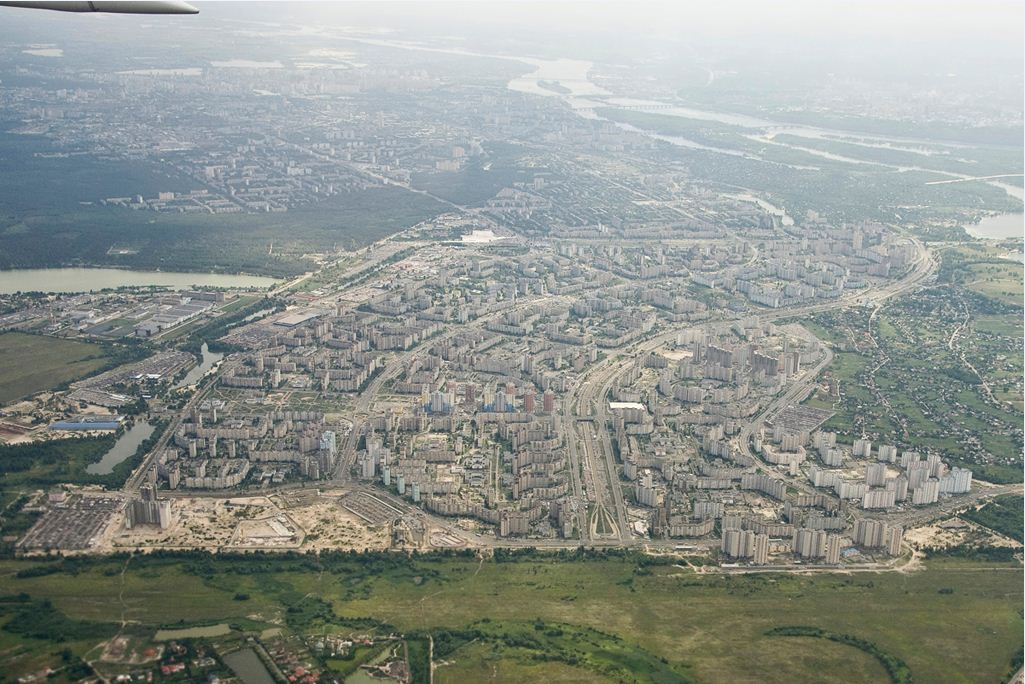
Bird's-eye view of Troieshchyna, looking westwards from the edge of Kyiv. The city's Dnipro River and right-bank are seen in the background.

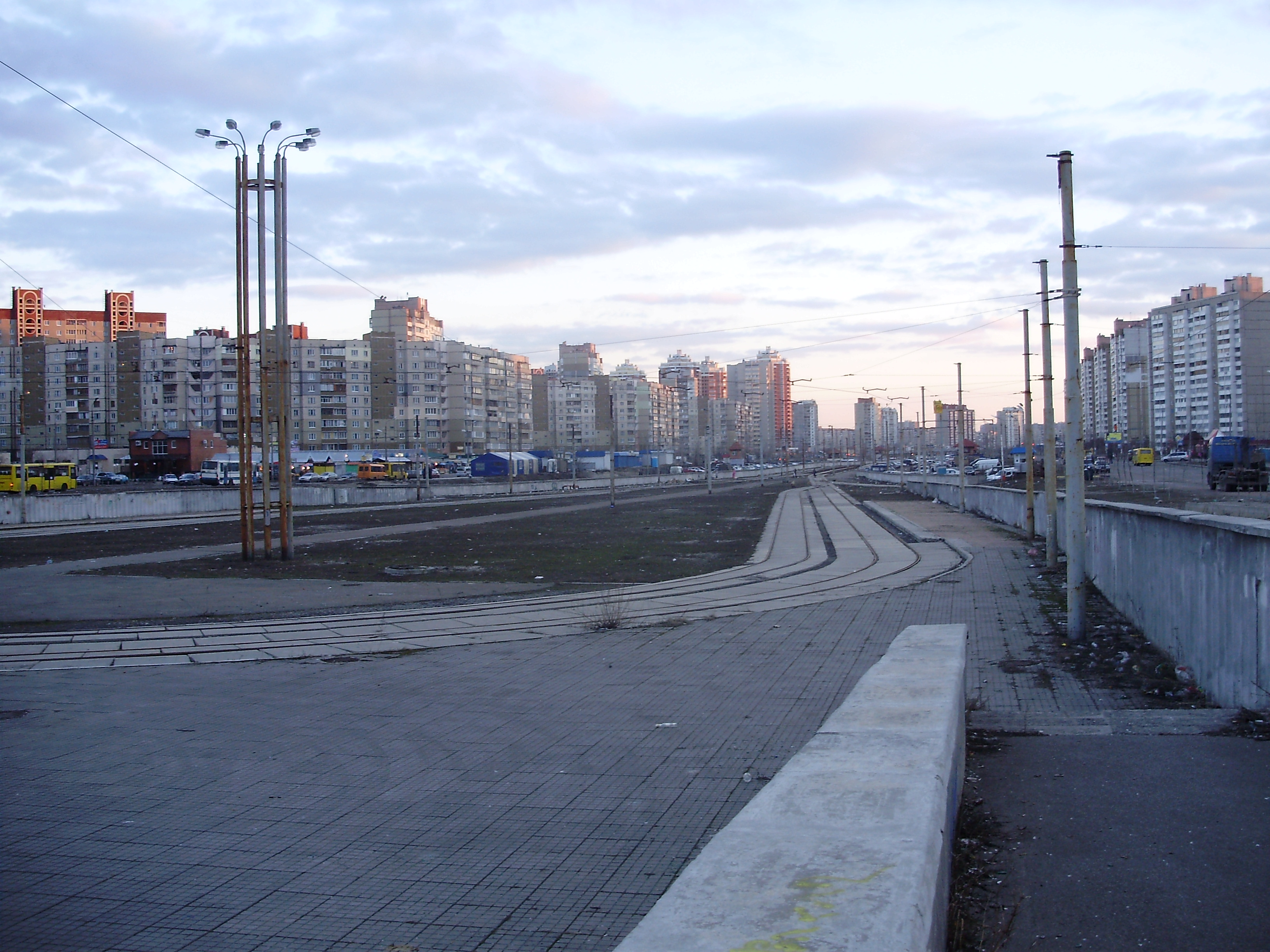
Typical skyline of Troieshchyna as seen from the light rail's Myloslavska Street Station

Troieshchyna, (Note: Ukrainian: Троєщина, pronounced [troˈjɛʃtʃɪnɐ], lit. 'Trinity'.) also known since 1997 as Vyhurivshchyna-Troieshchyna or Vygurivshchyna-Troieshchyna, (Note: Ukrainian: Вигурівщина-Троєщина, pronounced [wɪˈɦur⁽ʲ⁾iu̯ʃtʃɪnɐ troˈjɛʃtʃɪnɐ], or Виґурівщина-Троєщина, pronounced [wɪˈɡur⁽ʲ⁾iu̯ʃtʃɪnɐ troˈjɛʃtʃɪnɐ].) is a large neighbourhood of Kyiv, the capital of Ukraine. Troieshchyna is an outskirt located on the city's northern left bank and is administratively part of the Desnianskyi District.

== Overview ==
The neighbourhood is a large whole-planned bedroom district housing the population of at least 240,000 residents but also includes a small industrial area. Troieshchyna only became part of Kyiv municipality in 1988; prior to that it was a village of Kyiv Oblast which still exists on the edge of the new neighborhood.

Many of the former residents of Pripyat settled in Troieshchyna after the Chernobyl disaster.

The area suffers from inadequate transport links to the rest of the city. Kyiv City authorities have at one point decided on extending the Kyiv Metro system to Troieshchyna, either through the proposed Livoberezhna line or the Podilsko–Vyhurivska line which is currently under construction. However, the cost of building a new metro line was too high, and the proposal was scrapped in favor of modernizing an existing light rail system. But in 2018 construction of new bridge for metro continues.
