= Kyiv Light Rail =

Light rail rapid transit service in Kyiv, Ukraine

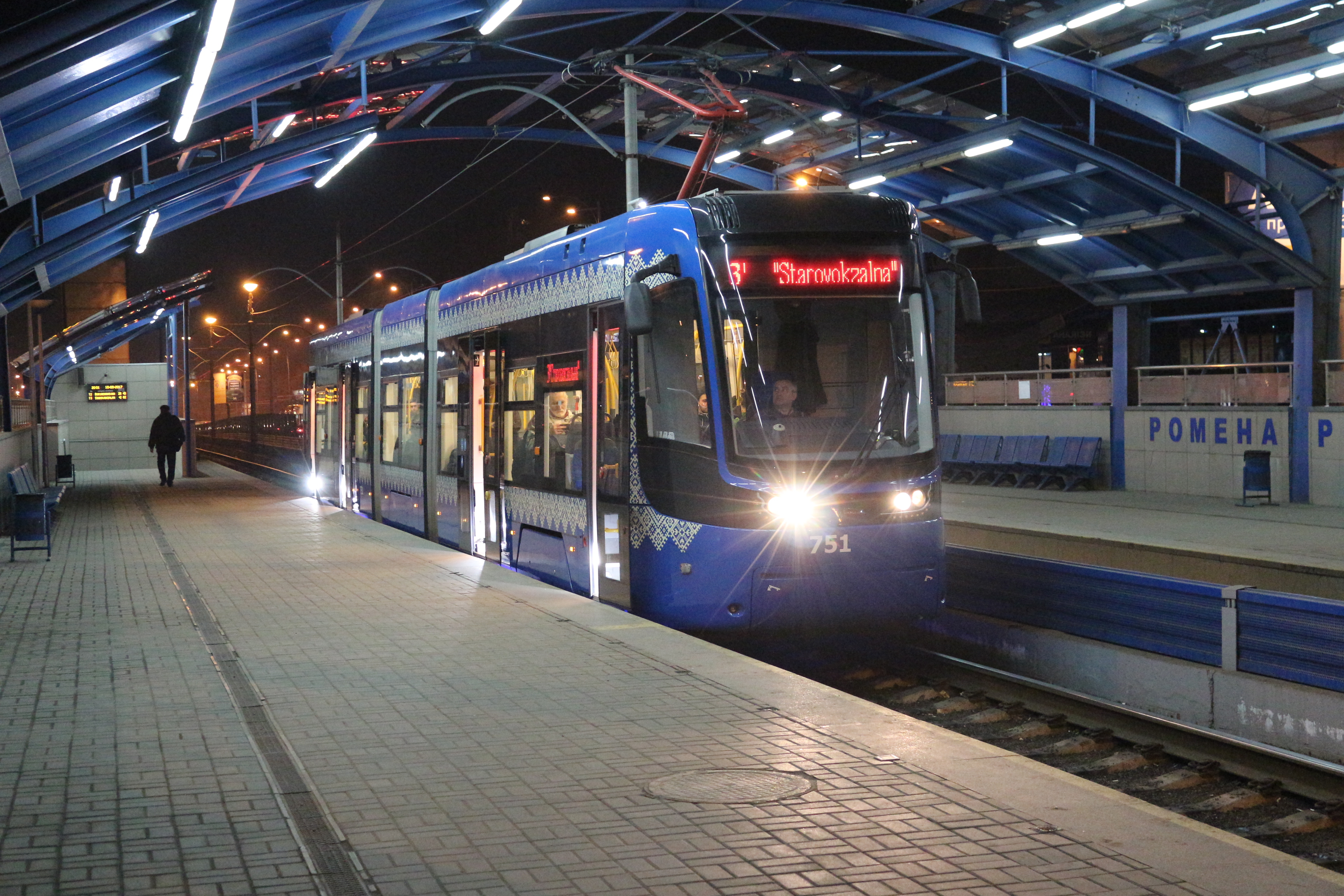
- Tram arrives at Politekhnichna station

Overview
- Locale: Kyiv, Ukraine
- Transit type: Light rail/Tram
- Number of lines: 2 lines / 5 routes
- Number of stations: 19

Operation
- Began operation: 1978
- Operator: Kyivpastrans

Technical
- System length: 21 km (13 mi)
- Track gauge: 1,524 mm (5 ft)
- Electrification: Overhead lines

Kyiv Light Rail or Kyiv Express Tram (Ukrainian: Київський швидкісний трамвай, translit.: Kyivs’kyi shvydkisnyi tramvai) consists of two light rail lines with rapid transit-like sections in the Ukrainian capital Kyiv. The system is largely grade-separated and is only connected to Kyiv's regular tram system at Starovokzalna and Myloslavska.

The two separate light rail lines are not connected. A third line has been announced. Both extant lines have intermodal stations providing links with the Kyiv Metro, urban electric train, in addition to other modes of the city's public transport.

== Lines ==
=== Pravoberezhna Line ===
The Pravoberezhna line (Ukrainian: Правобережна лінія) is the first tram line to be opened, and is located on the city's right-bank. It was closed for reconstruction in 2008 and opened again on 16 October 2010. The line is separated from other street traffic by fence for most of its length.

=== Livoberezhna Line ===
The Livoberezhna line (Ukrainian: Лівобережна лінія) is the system's second light rail line that was built in 1993–2000 to serve the Troieschyna neighborhood. It was closed after low passenger traffic in 2009, although it was rebuilt to connect with the urban electric train in 2010–2012 and re-opened on 25 October 2012. The line is also entirely separated from other traffic with fence and bridges.

== Gallery ==
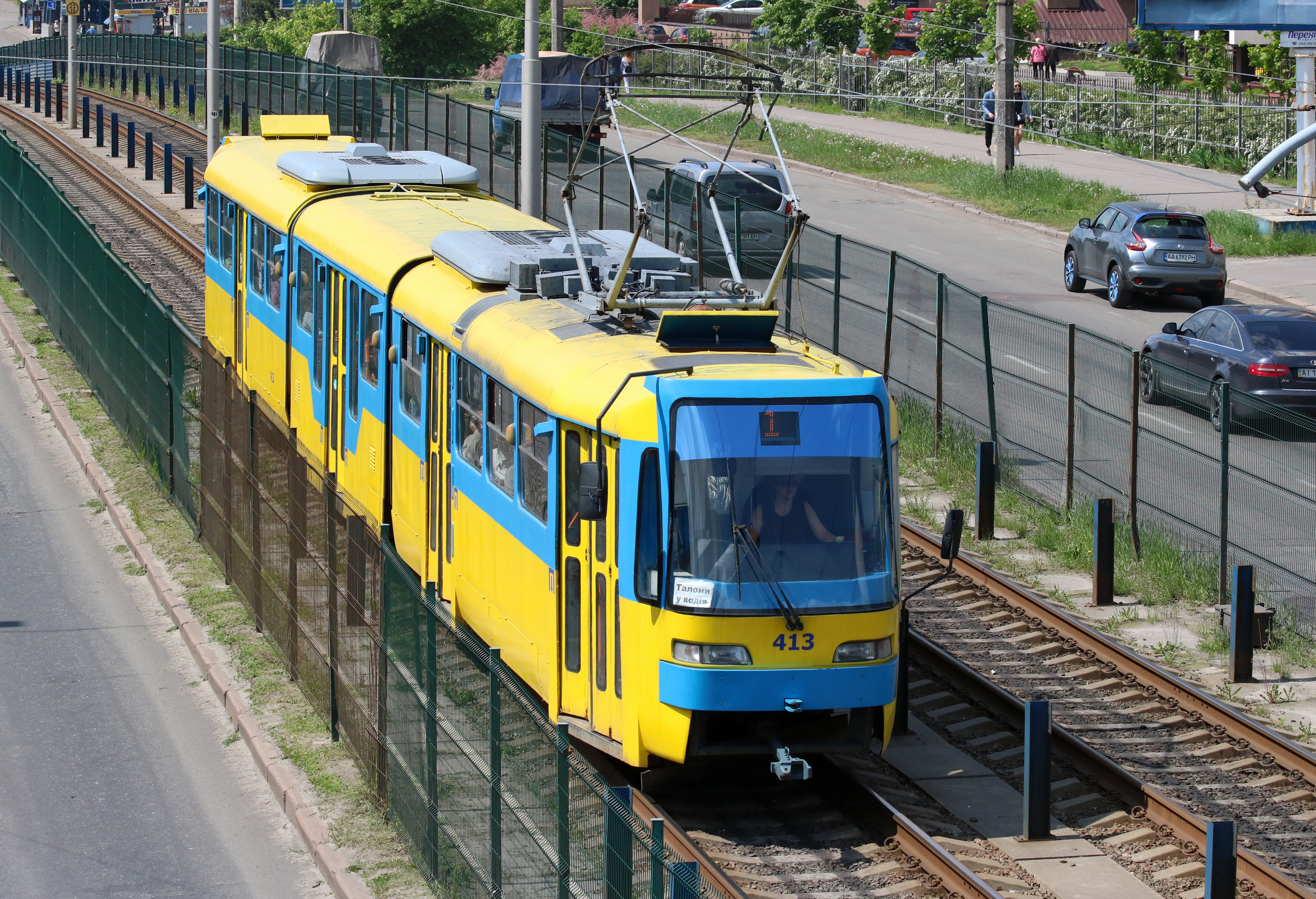
K3R-N tram locally built specifically for the Kyiv Light Rail.

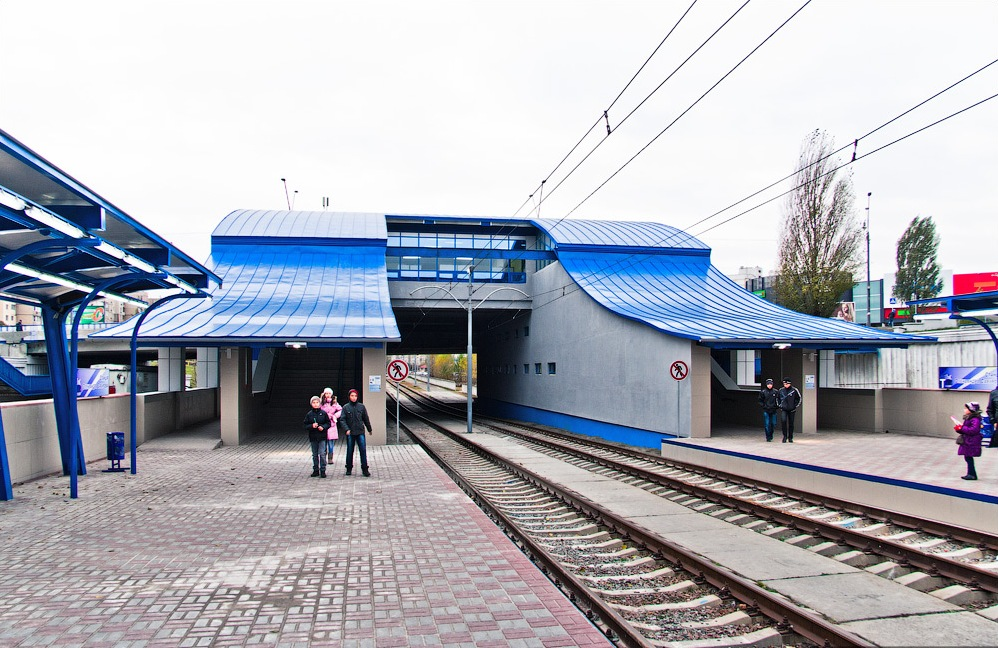
The Serzha Lyfaria station is integrated into an overpass bridge.

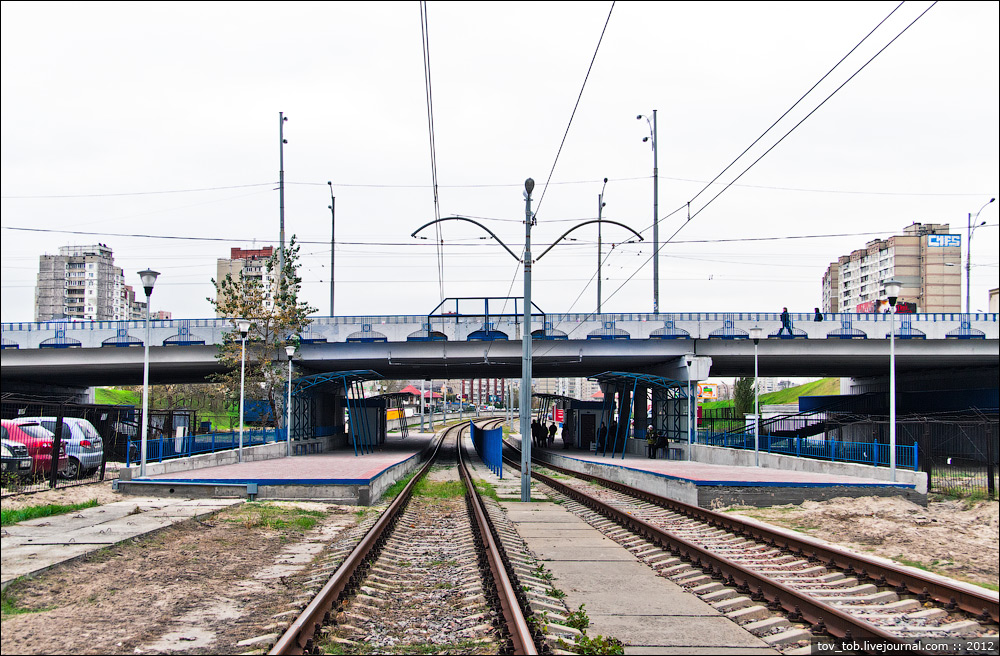
Grade separation at the Oleksandry Ekster station.

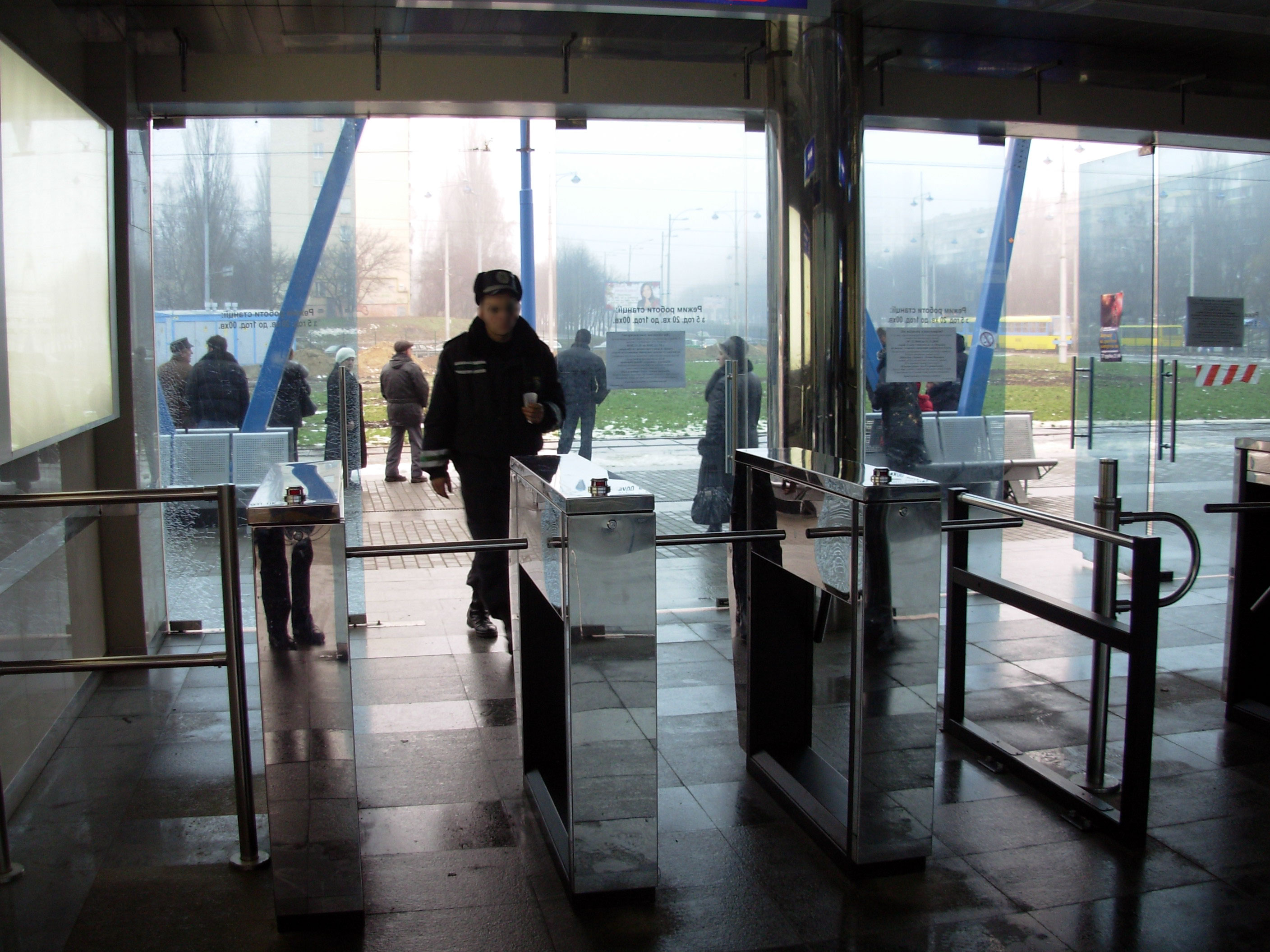
Turnstiles at the Kiltseva Doroha station's vestibule.

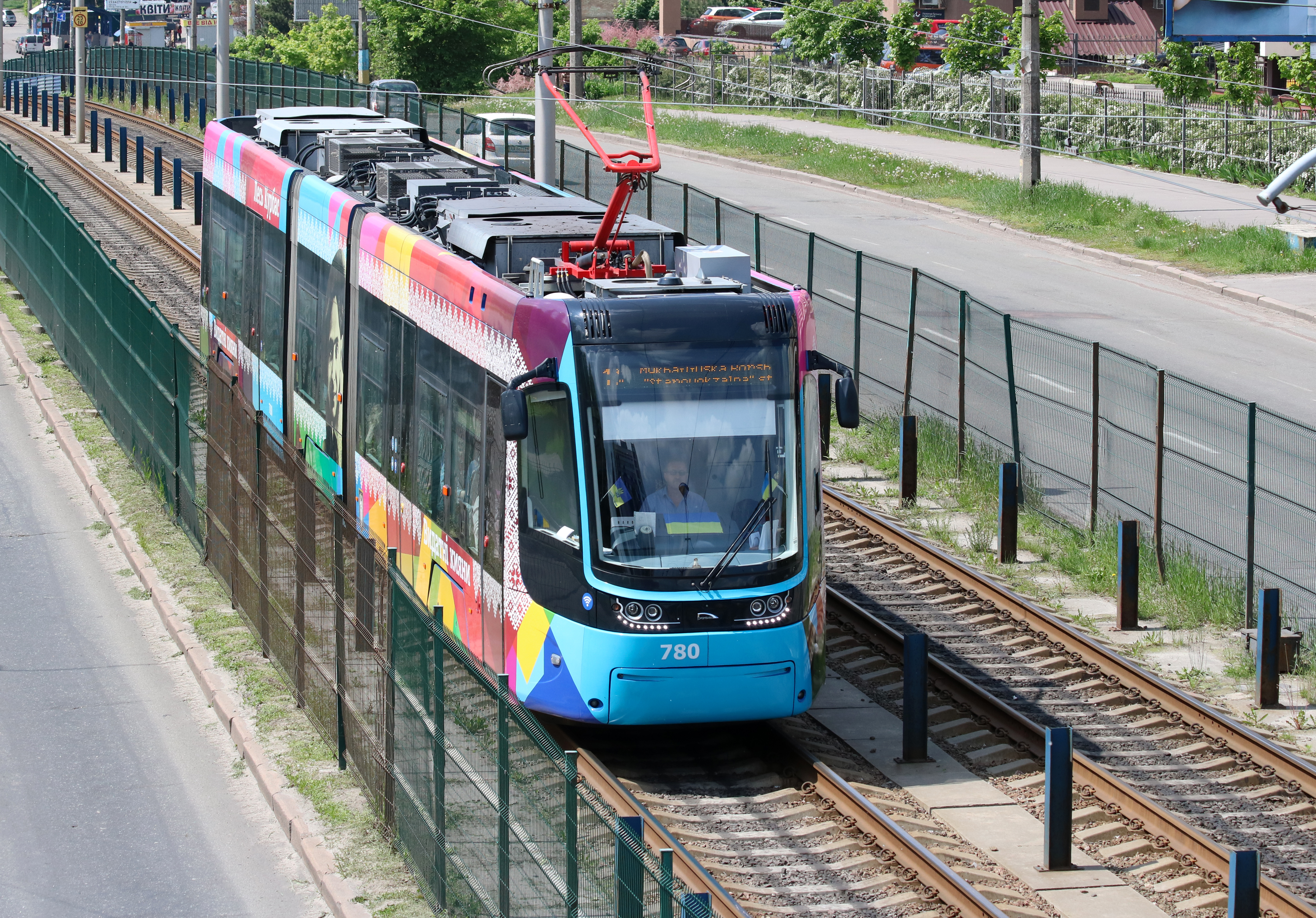
A 71-414K Fokstrot on the route #3

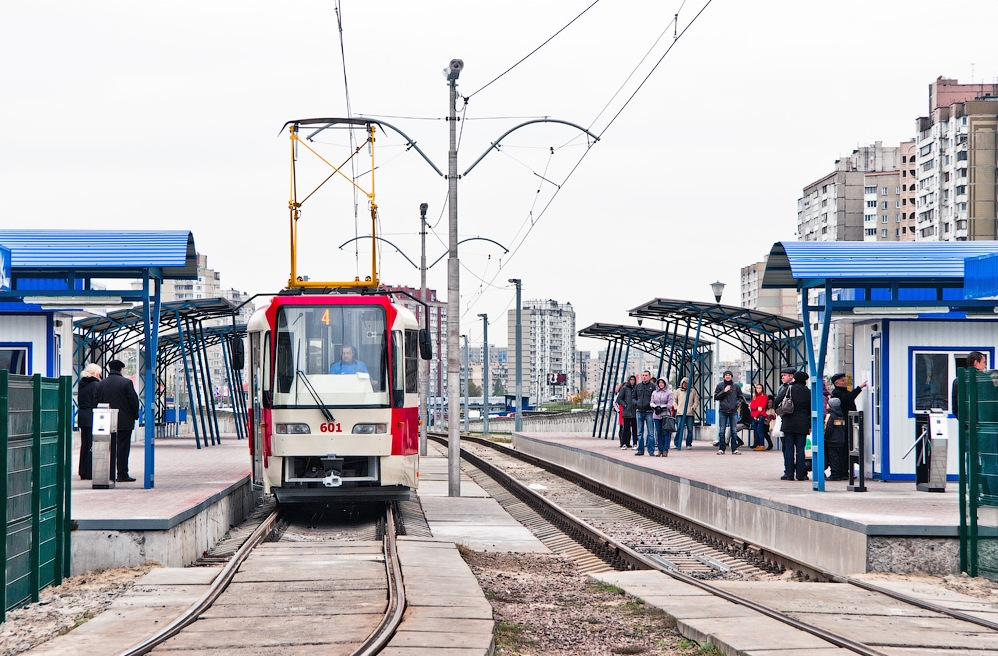
Myloslavska tram stop
