= Livoberezhna line (Kyiv Metro) =

Kyiv Metro line

Overview
- Locale: Kyiv, Ukraine

Service
- Type: Rapid transit
- System: Kyiv Metro

History
- Opened: Under planning

Technical
- Track gauge: 1,520 mm (4 ft 11 27/32 in) Russian gauge

Livoberezhna line (Ukrainian: Лівобережна лінія, romanized: Livoberezhna liniia, lit. 'left bank line') was a proposed fifth metro line of the Kyiv Metro system, which was planned to serve the left bank neighborhoods of the Ukrainian capital Kyiv. The line is typically colored sky blue on the maps.

== History ==
The line was proposed to have a transfer station with metro lines which would connect them to the city's right bank, including the Livoberezhna station of the Sviatoshynsko–Brovarska line and a future undecided station of the Podilsko–Vyhurivska line which is currently under construction. The line was also to have featured connections with existing intercity railway stations.

In April 2014, Volodymyr Bondarenko, then Chairman of the Kyiv City State Administration, stated that the proposition to extend a metro line to the city's Troieschyna neighborhood has been abandoned in favor of modernizing the Livoberezhna line of the city's light rail system.

The plan was rejected due to the high cost of building a new metro line. The most recent plan of the future metro lines no longer features the Livoberezhna line, and rather includes the Vyshhorodsko–Darnytska line, another proposed addition to the Kyiv Metro system.

On 2 September 2021, the cabinet of ministers of Ukraine allocated 50 million UAH for the development of the fifth line and to adjust the forth line, which is currently under construction.
