= Bridges in Kyiv =

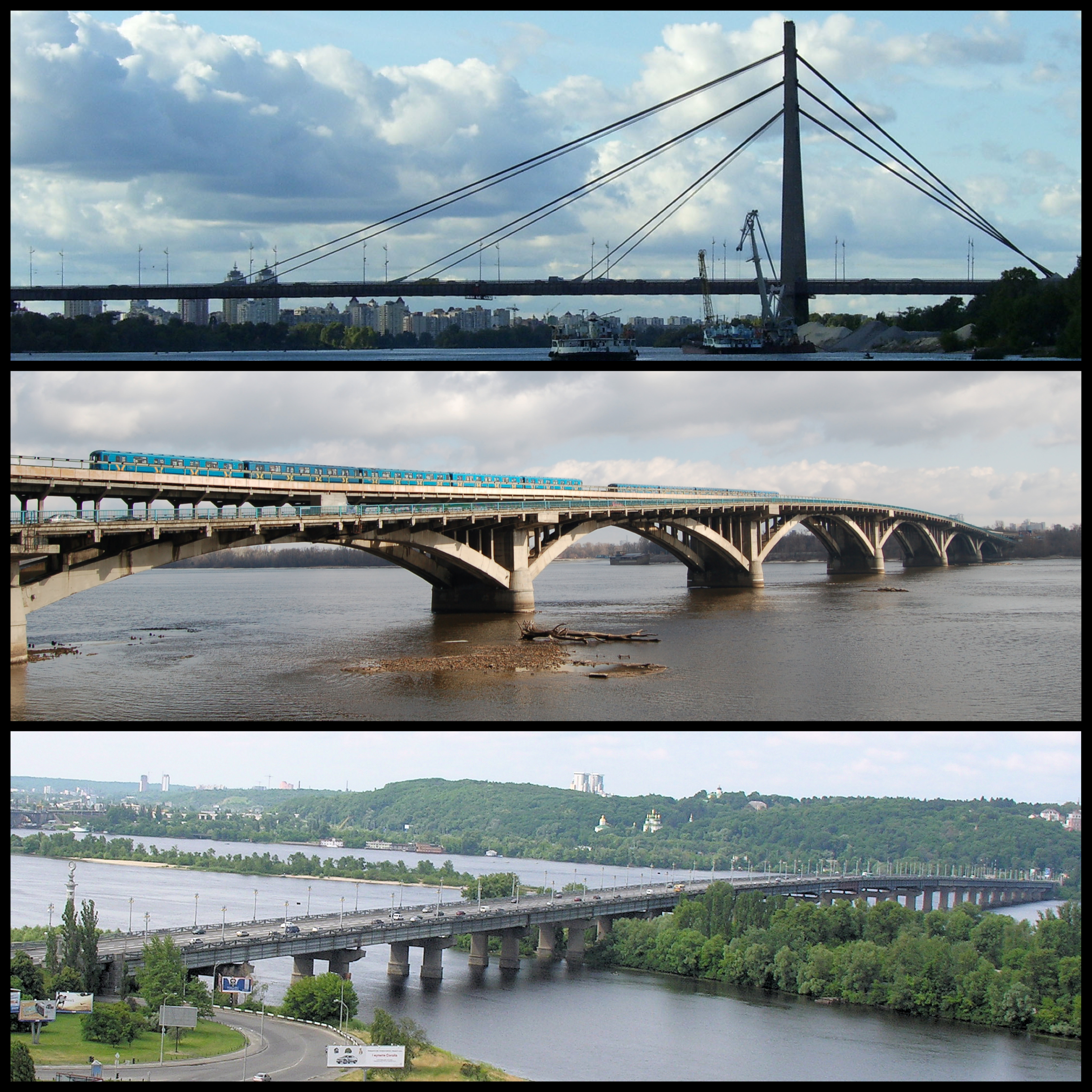
Some bridges in Kyiv (top to bottom): Pivnichnyi Bridge, Metro Bridge, Paton Bridge.

Kyiv, historically situated on the right bank of the Dnieper River, now covers both banks of the river whose width, as it flows through the city, reaches several hundred meters. Additionally, several tributaries join the Dnieper inside or just north or south of the historic city. Currently there are eight bridges spanning across the river and a few dozen bridges across the canals and Dnieper tributaries.

Due to the river's width and location, constructing bridges throughout the history of Kyiv has consistently been desirable yet highly challenging.

Temporary floater bridges were known to have existed since the 12th century. Stationary bridges existed in Kyiv from the mid-19th century, but none of them survived the turbulent events that followed the 1917 Russian Revolution.

== List of bridges ==
=== Existing bridges ===
Picture	Name	Architect	Usage	Length	Opened
	Parkovyi Bridge; Парковий міст, also Lovers' Bridge	Yevhen Paton	Pedestrians	52 metres (171 ft)	November 22, 1910
	Rybalskyi Railway Bridge; Рибальський залізничний міст	Yevhen Paton	Railway	1,430 metres (4,690 ft)	January 1917
	Darnytskyi Bridge; Дарницький міст	Mykhailo Rudenko	Railway	1,114 metres (3,655 ft)	1951
	Paton Bridge; Міст імені Патона	Yevhen Paton	Automobiles; Trams (1953–2004)	1,543 metres (5,062 ft)	November 5, 1953
	Parkovyi Footbridge across the Dnipro; Парковий міст	Aleksei Zavarov	Pedestrians	427 metres (1,401 ft)	July 3, 1957
	Rybalskyi Cable Bridge; Рибальський вантовий міст	Abram Goldshtein	Automobiles	474 metres (1,555 ft)	September 23, 1963
	Rusanivskyi Bridge; Русанівський міст		Automobiles	100 metres (330 ft)	1963
	Rusanivskyi Bridge; Русанівський міст		Automobiles	95 metres (312 ft)	1964
	Rusanivskyi Bridge; Русанівський міст		Automobiles	120 metres (390 ft)	1964
	Metro Bridge; Міст Метро	Heorhiy Fuks	Automobiles; Metro	682 metres (2,238 ft)	November 5, 1965
	Rusanivskyi Metro Bridge; Русанівський метроміст	Heorhiy Fuks	Automobiles; Metro	349 metres (1,145 ft)	November 5, 1965
	Venetsiiskyi Bridge; Венеційський міст	Oleg Iliashenko	Pedestrians	144 metres (472 ft)	1966
	Rusanivskyi Footbridge; Русанівський міст		Pedestrians	100 metres (330 ft)	1967
	Rusanivskyi Footbridge; Русанівський міст		Pedestrians	110 metres (360 ft)	1967
	Pivnichnyi Bridge; Північний міст	Mikhail Krasnoshtein	Automobiles	816 metres (2,677 ft)	December 3, 1976
	Pivdennyi Bridge; Південний міст	Heorhiy Fuks	Automobiles; Metro	1,256 metres (4,121 ft)	December 25, 1990
	Heavenly Hundred Bridge; Міст Небесної сотні		Pedestrians	45 metres (148 ft)	2002
	Havanskyi Bridge; Гаванський міст	Yuriy Borodkin	Automobiles	380 metres (1,250 ft)	December 17, 2007; October 23, 2010
	Darnytskyi Railway and Automobile Bridge Crossing; Дарницький залізнично-автомобільний мостовий перехід	Oleg Zavarzin	Automobiles; Railway	1,100 metres (3,600 ft)	September 27, 2010; July 6, 2023
	Pedestrian and Cycling Bridge over Volodymyrskyi Descent; Пішохідно-велосипедний міст через Володимирський узвіз	Andriy Myrhorodskyi	Pedestrians	216 metres (709 ft)	May 25, 2019
	Podilskyi Bridge Crossing; Подільський мостовий перехід	Heorhiy Fuks	Automobiles; Metro	4,432 metres (14,541 ft)	December 1, 2023; December 1, 2024; August 23, 2025
	Automobile Bridge to Obolonskyi Island; Автомобільний міст на Оболонський острів		Automobiles; Pedestrians	61 metres (200 ft)	2023
	Pedestrian Bridge to Obolonskyi Island; Пішохідний міст на Оболонський острів	Andriy Myrhorodskyi	Pedestrians	164 metres (538 ft)	May 24, 2024
	Vilnius Bridge; Вільнюський міст (northern Pedestrian Bridge to Obolonskyi Island)		Pedestrians	24 metres (79 ft)	June 23, 2026

=== Destroyed bridges ===
Picture	Name	Architect	Usage	Length	Opened	Destroyed
	Mykolaivskyi Chain Bridge; Миколаївський ланцюговий міст	Charles Vignoles	Pedestrians; Trams	776 metres (2,546 ft)	October 10, 1853	June 10, 1920
	Darnytskyi Railroad Bridge; Дарницький залізничний міст	Amand Struve	Railway	1,067 metres (3,501 ft)	February 25, 1870	November 1943
	Rusanivskyi Bridge; Русанівський міст	Vladimir Apyshkov	Pedestrians; Trams	202 metres (663 ft)	October 24, 1906	September 19, 1941
	Yevheniia Bosh Bridge; Міст Євгенії Бош	Yevhen Paton	Automobiles	776 metres (2,546 ft)	May 10, 1925	September 19, 1941
	Navodnytskyi Bridge; Наводницький міст	Konstantin Yakovlev	Automobiles	1,780 metres (5,840 ft)	1941	1953

== History ==
=== Early history ===
According to the chronicles, the earliest floating bridge across the Dnieper River in the area was built in the 1115. It was located near Vyshhorod or, according to different accounts, near the Vydubychi Monastery. Records exist about another floater in the 17th century with stationary approaches from the shores.

Того же лѣта устрои мостъ чересъ Днѣпръ

— Primary Chronicle, in translation: The same summer there was established a bridge over Dnieper

Such bridges could only be temporary, as the Dnieper freezes over in most winters at Kyiv's latitude, and ice drift each spring remain a concern even for modern bridges. Additionally, the river current was especially strong before the Dnieper was dammed in the 20th century. Therefore, the cross-river traffic was carried by boats and ferries for many centuries.

=== First stationary bridges: late 19th to early-20th century ===
From the mid-19th century to the mid-20th century, Kyiv was served by two stationary bridges. Both bridges had similar fates. Built at the times of the Industrial Revolution in the Russian Empire these engineering masterpieces of their time survived World War I and the Russian Civil War. Both were blown up in 1920 by the Polish troops retreating from Kyiv following the joint Polish-Ukrainian anti-Soviet Kyiv offensive.

==== Nicholas Chain Bridge ====
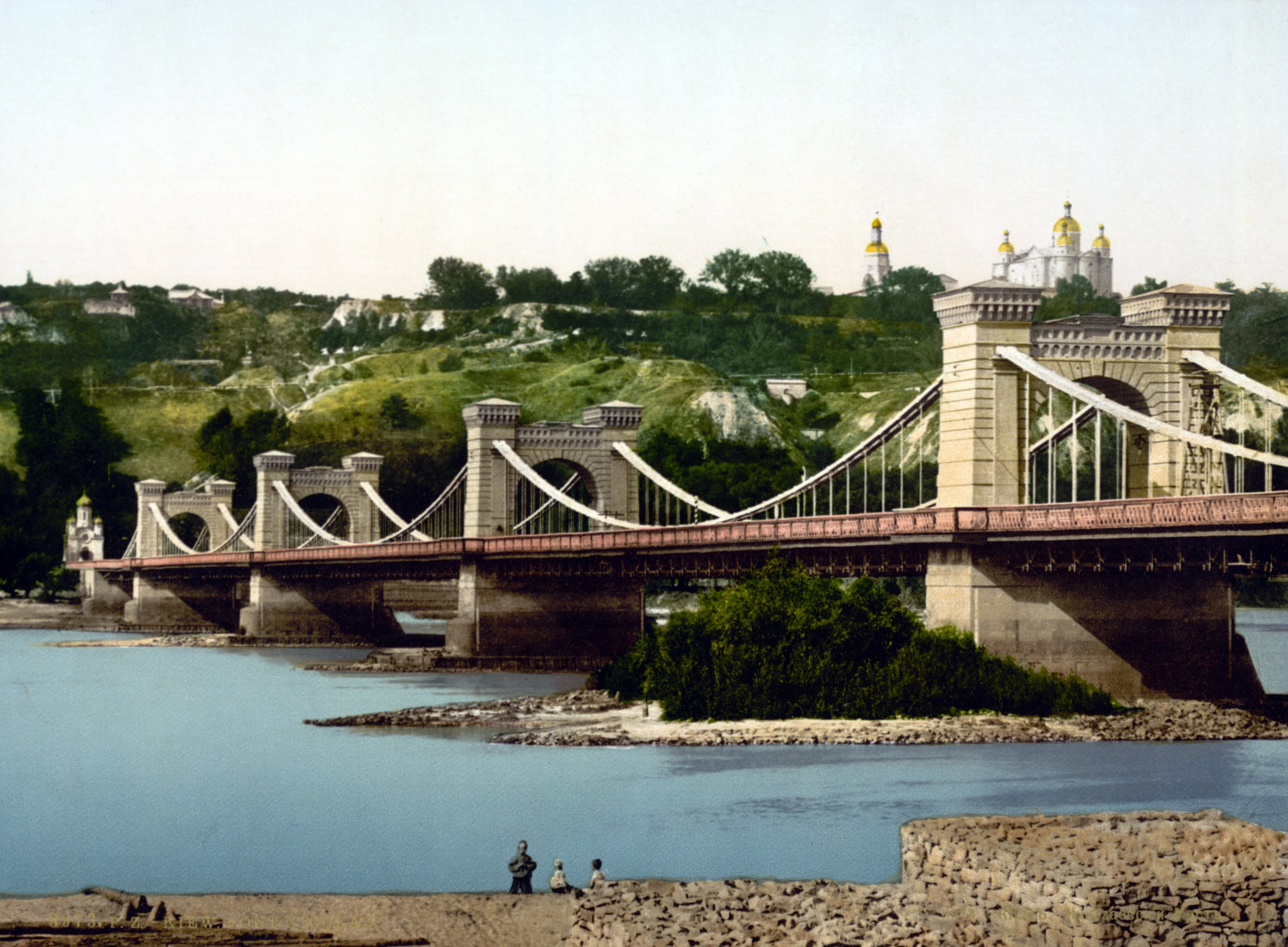
The Nicholas Bridge, photographed in 1896

The first stationary bridge in Kyiv was built between 1848 and 1853. This 770 m (2,526 ft)-long Nicholas Bridge was a chain suspension bridge rested on five pillars. Being one of the largest and most beautiful bridges in Europe, it was the pride of the city until it was blown up in 1920 by the Polish troops. The heavily damaged bridge was not subject to the restoration and in 1925 a new bridge was constructed in its place under the name Yevheniya Bosch Bridge (see below).

==== Struve (Darnytskyi) Railroad Bridge ====
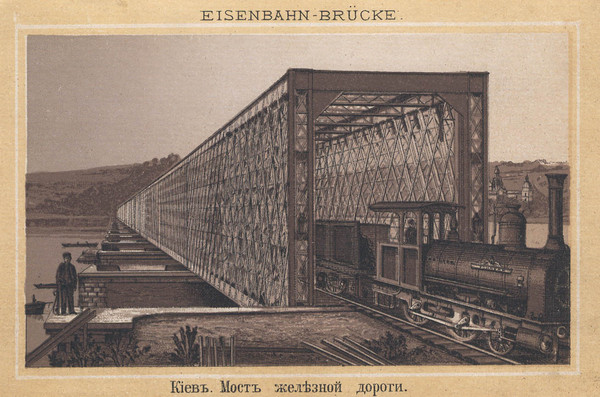
An 1870s postcard of the Struve Railroad Bridge

The Struve Railroad Bridge, Kyiv's second stationary bridge, was built in 1868–1870 with the construction supervision conducted personally by Amand Struve. This over 1 kilometer long railroad truss bridge was initially named to its constructor, engineer Struve. Standing on 13 piers, over 1 km (0.62 mi) long, the bridge was the longest in Europe at that time. During the construction Struve first in the Russian Empire used caisson method to lay the foundation. On February 17, 1870 the first train by the Kyiv-Kursk railroad company arrived through the bridge to the Kyiv railroad station. Similarly to the Nicholas Bridge, the Struve Bridge survived World War I and the Civil war, but was blown up in 1920 by the retreating Polish troops (see: Kyiv offensive).

==== Rusanivsky bridge ====
The bridge was built in 1906 and was blown up in 1943 by the retreating forces of Nazi Germany. Rusanivsky bridge connected the Darnytsia region with the city of Kyiv by the Brovary chaussée (highway). The bridge was designed by architect V.Apishkov. In 1965 in its place was erected the Metro Bridge and the Rusanivsky Metropolitan Bridge (extension of the first) which both are part of the Svyatoshyno-Brovary Subway Line (SBL).

=== Between World War I and World War II ===
New bridges were built in the early Soviet years but were destroyed in the first months of the 1941 Nazi German invasion. Restored by forced labor of war prisoners and civilians during German occupation they were blown up again by Germans when they retreated from Kyiv in November 1943.

==== Bosch bridges ====
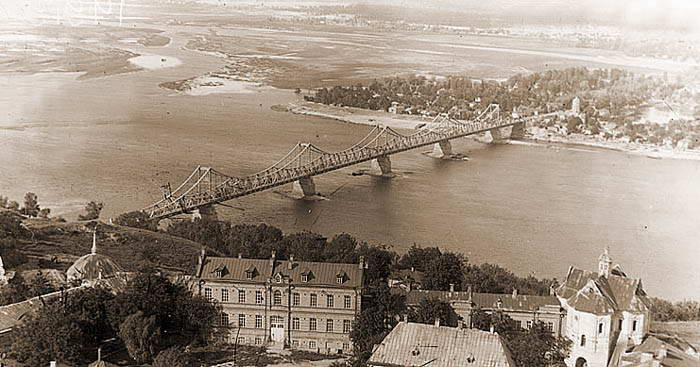
The Yevheniya Bosch Bridge

Within months after the Polish troops blew up the original chain bridge, that very summer 1920 the Ukrainian engineer Evgeny Paton proposed the reconstruction project that would have reused the old chains to be lifted from under water. However, rusting made the metallic parts of the old bridge unusable and for the following two years Paton worked on several projects of the Nicholas bridge's restoration. He ended up proposing to construct a totally new bridge but this proposal was declined by the supporters of the reusing of the old elements from underwater. The year of 1923 passed in arguing between the two proposals. The construction overseen by Paton was finished by 1925. The Yevheniya Bosch Bridge was named after the former Soviet People's Secretary of Internal Affairs and a fierce Bolshevik, Yevgeniya Bosch.

Following the Nazi attack on the Soviet Union, the bridge was destroyed on September 18, 1941, by retreating Soviet forces. A pontoon bridge was built on its place by forced labour under German occupation, which was destroyed again by German troops retreating from Kyiv.

==== Darnytskyi Railroad Bridge ====
The replacement Darnytskyi railroad bridge was built in the early 1920s but shared the fate of the Bosch Bridge. Destroyed in the first months of the Great Patriotic War, it was restored during German occupation by forced labor, and was destroyed again by retreating German troops.

During the Battle of Kyiv, Red Army's attempt to catch the bridge by landing forces was unsuccessful. The Germans blew up the bridge under the eyes of the Soviet landing force unit. The landing unit was disbanded for the operation failure.

Immediately after the liberation a temporary wooden bridge was built at the location of the blown up Darnytskyi bridge by the Red Army engineers in the record thirteen-day time (some sources cite thirty days) in the urgency to facilitate the pursuit of the German army on its retreat from Ukraine. The record short construction time plan was met despite the frequent German bombing raids. 50,000 Kyivites took part in the bridge construction.

==== Underwater tunnels ====
A few years before World War II the Soviet government planned two underground railroad lines to be laid underneath the bedrock of Dnieper river. One tunnel line (Northern) would have stretched from the Obolon neighborhood (Obolon Raion) and to what is known as Vygurivshchyna (Desna Raion) near Voskresenska Slobidka on the left bank of Dnieper in the close proximity of Troieschyna. Another line (Southern) was planned to cross the Dnieper from the Zhukiv Island to Osokorky (Darnytsia Raion). The project came up in a fear that in case of a war the bridges over the Dnieper were a vulnerable part of the regional transport infrastructure, and tunnels might be a long-term strategic solution.

The construction started in 1936 and was planned to be finished sometime in 1944. The NKVD oversaw the project, drafting hundreds of military, civilian and prison workers to work on it. The underdeveloped technology of the time required special makeshift caissons (vertical mines for ventilation and soil extraction) to be built in the middle of the river. Due to technical failures and the start of the war, the construction was never finished or even disclosed to the public. The builders were able only to connect the Right Bank with the close Zhukiv Island (where the present-day southern port is situated). The flooded entrance to the tunnel and abandoned caissons can now be seen in the forests and bays of Holosiivskyi Raion. Contemporary amateur researchers believe that a large secret base component of the project, including a train station, barracks and mass graves of workers, are also located in the depths of the tunnels.

After the start of World War II all tunnel construction (known as the Construction No.1) was suspended and afterwards recognized as unreasonable. Nonetheless, the entrances to the unfinished tunnels, which are mostly unguarded, still exist around the mentioned neighborhoods.

=== Modern bridges ===
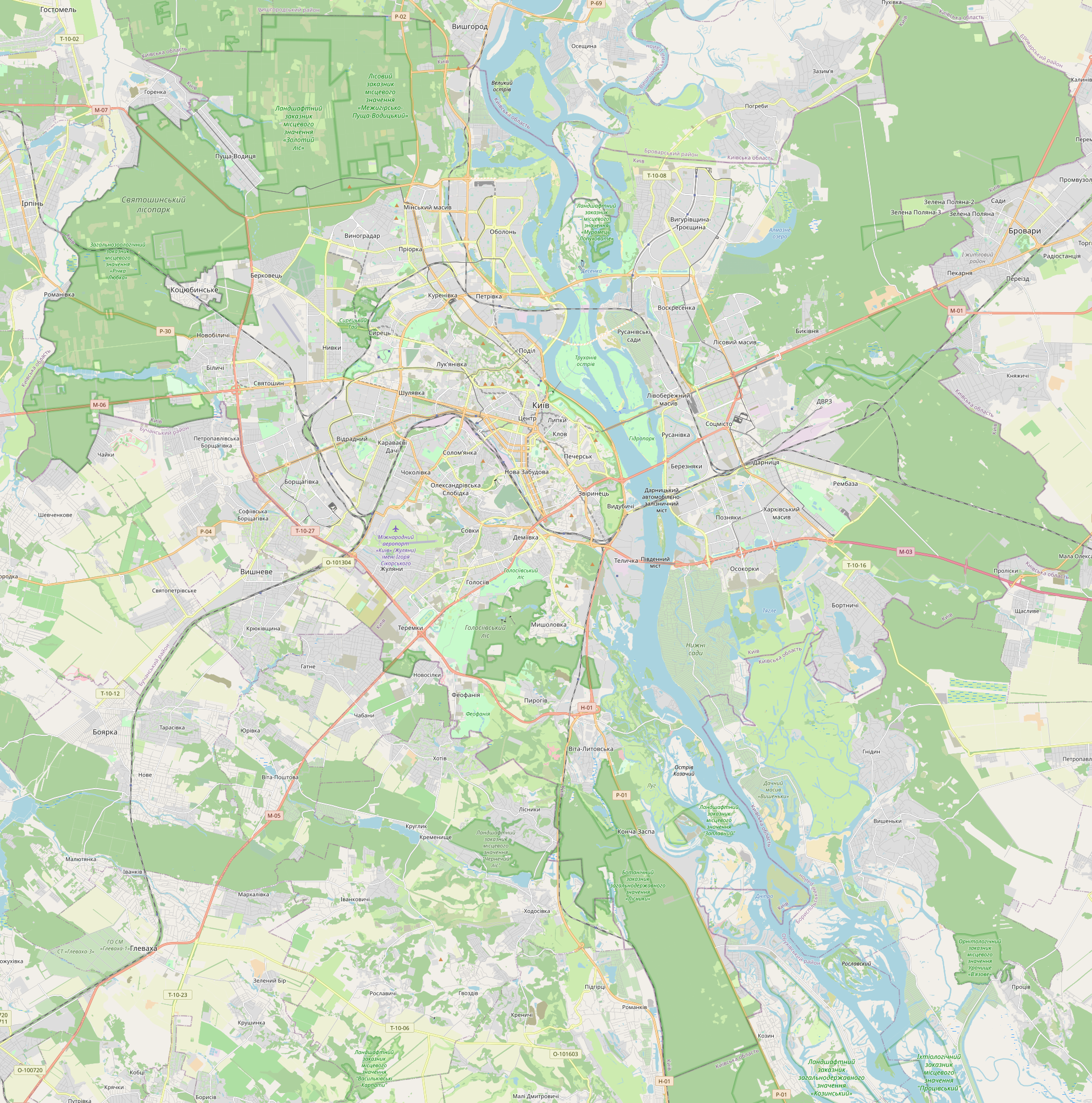
The Dnipro bridges of Kyiv

Note: Bridges are listed southwards along the river flow.

==== Pivnichnyi Bridge ====
The road-only Pivnichnyi Bridge (50°29′26″N 30°32′09″E) (until February 2018 the bridge was named Moskovskyi Bridge), designed by the architect A.V.Dobrovolsky and engineered by G.B.Fux, was built in 1976. It is a cable-stayed bridge, with the beam of the main span being held by a cluster of steel ropes which are fixed to a 115 meters tall A-pylon. The bridge consists of two spans: a 816 m (2,677 ft) long and 31.4 m (103 ft) wide span across the Dnieper and a 732 m (2,402 ft) long, 29.1 m (95 ft) wide span across the Desyonka, a Dnieper tributary.

The northernmost of the city bridges, Pivnichnyi Bridge is a key structure on the northern end of the Kyiv Smaller Ring Road, connecting Pochaina to the densely populated north-eastern residential neighborhoods, mainly Troieschyna. From the moment of its construction the bridge was built as a high-speed motorway, which it remains to this day.

==== Rybalskyi Railroad Bridge ====
The Rybalskyi Railroad Bridge (50°29′01″N 30°32′50″E) is made of steel trusses. It was originally built in 1929 and was known as Petrovskyi Bridge at that time. Like other bridges, it was blown up in the course of World War II, but was not heavily damaged and was reopened in 1944.

The Rybalskyi Railroad Bridge completes the railway circle around Kyiv. However, the bridge is limited to slow-speed rail traffic due to its age.

==== Harbor bridges ====
===== Rybalskyi (Fisherman's) Bridge =====
A steel bridge connects Podil neighborhood to the Rybalskyi Peninsula over the Kyiv Harbor. In the 1990s, the bridge was found unsafe for automobile traffic and since 2001 it was reserved for pedestrians only. The bridge was fenced off from February 2, 2009 and set to be dismantled. In 2019 the bridge was closed for pedestrians in preparation for its demolition.

===== Havanskyi Bridge =====
The automobile-only Havanskyi ("Harbor") Bridge was opened on 17 December 2007 for automotive traffic from Podil towards Obolon across Havan' (Ukrainian: Гавань) — the harbor in the mouth of the former Pochaina River, with the construction being started in 2003, serving as a substitute for the closed Rybalskyi Bridge. On October 23, 2010 the bridge was opened for two-way traffic together with an adjacent flyover on the right bank.

==== Parkovyi Footbridge ====
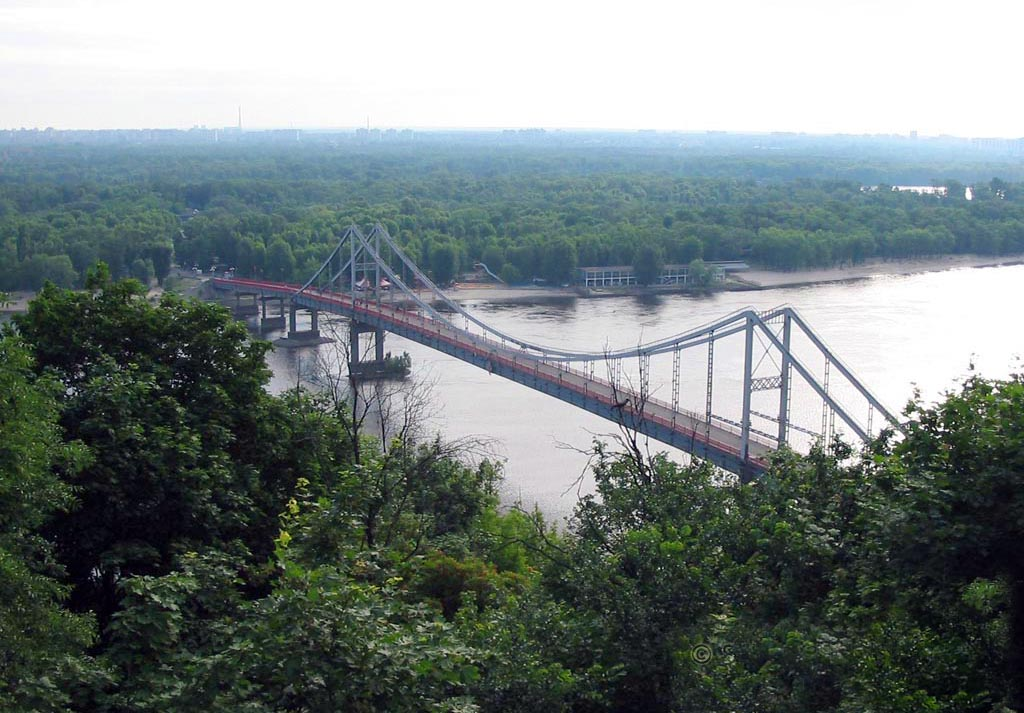
The Parkovyi Bridge

The Parkovyi Bridge, also known as the Parkovyi Footbridge, designed by architect V. Suvorov and engineered by V. Kiriyenko, was built in 1957. The bridge is a light construction 400 m (1,312 ft) in length that connects Kyiv to the Trukhaniv Island park-area. This is the only bridge constructed specifically for the pedestrian traffic over the Dnieper fairway, and for this reason it is formally included in the number of Kyiv bridges across Dnieper.

==== Venetian Bridge ====
The automobile-only Venetian Bridge, designed by architect A. Ilyashenko and engineered by V. Koval, was built in 1966. The bridge spans the Venetian Canal dividing the Venetsiiskyi Island and the Dolobetskyi Island.

==== Rusanivka Bridges ====
The Rusanivka Bridges were built in the 1960s over the Rusanivka Canal, connecting the neighborhood with the rest of Left Bank city. There are 5 bridges, 2 of them are exclusively pedestrian. Prior to World War II, Rusanivka had been connected to the rest of Kyiv by a bridge, but it was destroyed during the war. The Rusanivka bridges are a popular place for amateur fishermen.

==== Metro Bridge ====
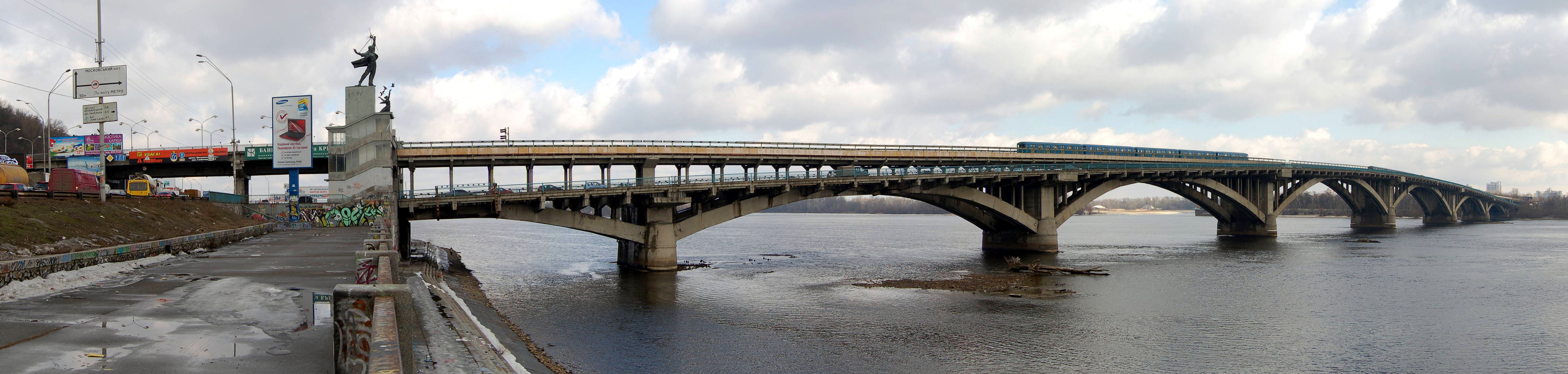
Metro Bridge seen from the Right-bank Dnipro embankment.

The auto-and-rail Metro Bridge (50°26′35″N 30°33′50″E), engineered by G. Fux and Y. Inosov and built in 1965. The bridge is used for both the Sviatoshynsko-Brovarska Line of Kyiv Metro and automobile traffic (being part of the Brovary Parkway). The Metro bridge consists of two spans as it links the central Hydropark island as well as the left and right banks. The larger span consists of an elevated central Metro deck and side automobile decks on separate, lower spans. Both the Metro and automobile paths have a distinct arched contour. This was because the Metro line continues into the hill of the right bank with the Dnipro station.

The smaller span called Rusanivskyi Bridge, which links the Hydropark with the left bank, is a conventional, level span, with two northern traffic lanes and a southern Metro path.

==== Paton Bridge ====
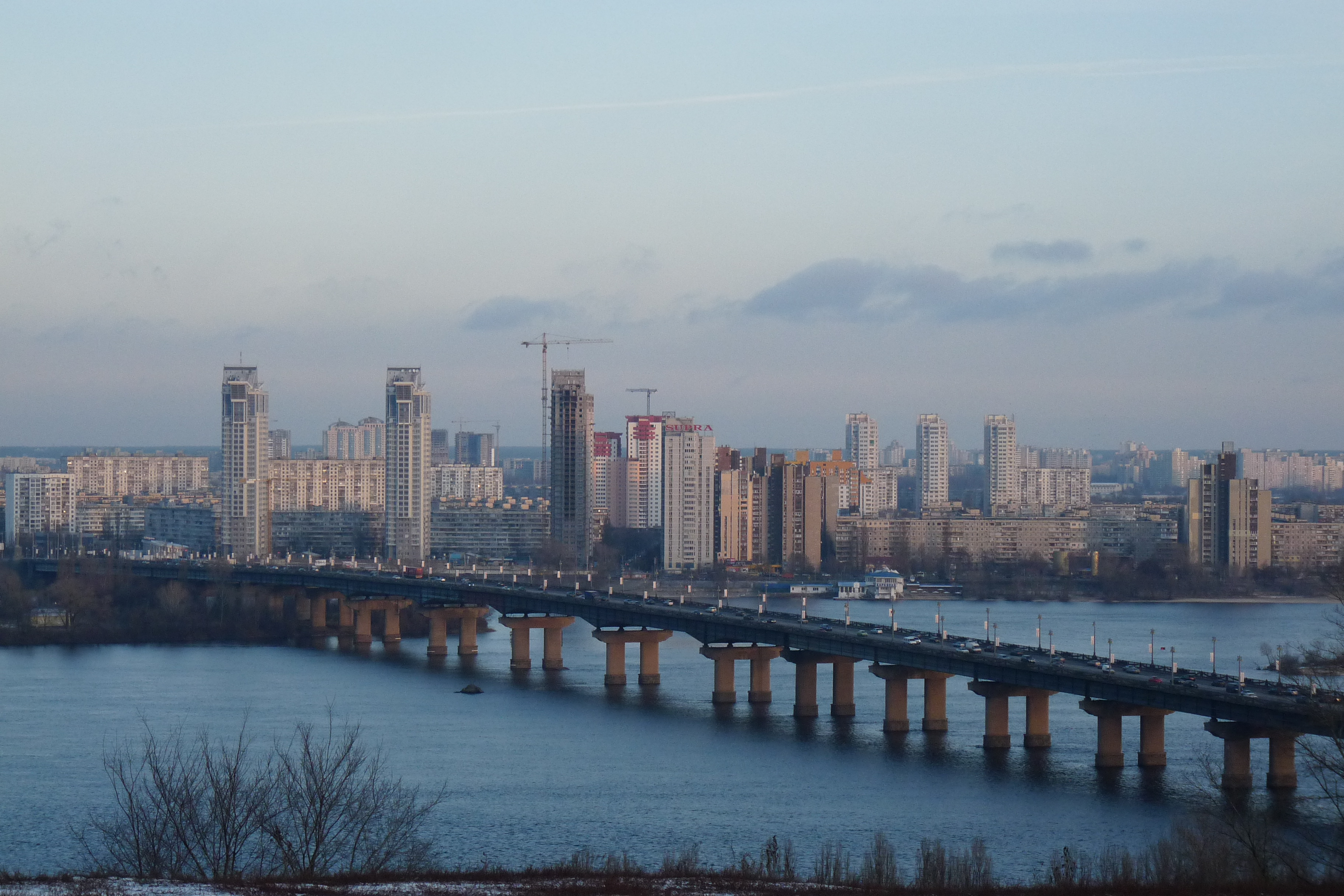
The Paton Bridge.

The 1,543 meters long automobile-only Paton Bridge (50°25′38″N 30°34′55″E), built in 1953, is the longest of the Dnieper bridges in the city. It was the first fully welded steel construction of such length in the world to the date of completion and it was the longest bridge in Europe at that time. The bridge was named after Evgeny Paton, the famous welding engineer who developed the technology for the structure. He died a few weeks before the construction was completed, never seeing his masterpiece.

Initially carrying the automotive traffic and cross-Dnieper tram lines, the bridge have recently been renovated. The tram rails were removed and the electric trolley bus infrastructure was added to the bridge. Shutting down the tram line that historically served the bridge has met the mixed reception from the Kyivites, despite the municipal authorities claimed that the tram service over the bridge has become impractical.

The bridge currently has 3 traffic lanes in both directions and one reversible lane connecting Pechersk to the Left Bank.

==== Darnytskyi Railroad Bridge ====
The old Darnytskyi Railroad Bridge (50°24′58″N 30°35′11″E), engineered by I. Barenboym and E. Radzevich, was built in 1949. It took the place of an older bridge, which was destroyed in 1941 in the first days of the German invasion of the Soviet Union (see the earlier history section.).

==== New Darnytskyi Bridge ====
The New Darnytskyi Bridge is an auto-and-rail bridge, constructed 50 m (164 ft) south of the existing Darnytskyi Railroad Bridge. The bridge carries 2 lanes of railroad, and 6 lanes of auto traffic. The bridge's expected capacity is 60,000 vehicles and 120 pairs of trains per day. Already operational as itself, the bridge complex now lacks road connection ramps from some directions which are still under construction. Additional railroad links to match new bridge' capacity are also being constructed. On September 27, 2010 the railroad part of the bridge was officially opened; on March 31, 2011, road traffic opened. As of the last government notice, the bridge was expected to be completed in 2012. Following the construction of the bridge, a new major passenger terminal will be completed in the Darnytsia Railway Station on the Left Bank of the city. In 2023 part of the ramps providing access to the bridge from the left bank were finished, and as of 2024 another ramp was still to be completed.

==== Pivdennyi Bridge ====
The auto-and-rail Pivdennyi ("Southern") Bridge (50°23′41″N 30°35′23″E), designed by the architect A. Gavrilov and engineered by G. Fux, was built in 1990. It is the second metro bridge in Kyiv, serving both the Syretsko-Pecherska metro line and automobile traffic. The shrouds holding the spans on the bridge are supported by a two-column ferroconcrete construction 115 m (377 ft) in height.

The bridge currently has 3 traffic lanes in both directions. It connects the Vydubychi to the rapidly developing left-bank Darnytsia neighborhood, completing the southern end of the Kyiv Smaller Ring Road route.

=== Bridges in construction ===
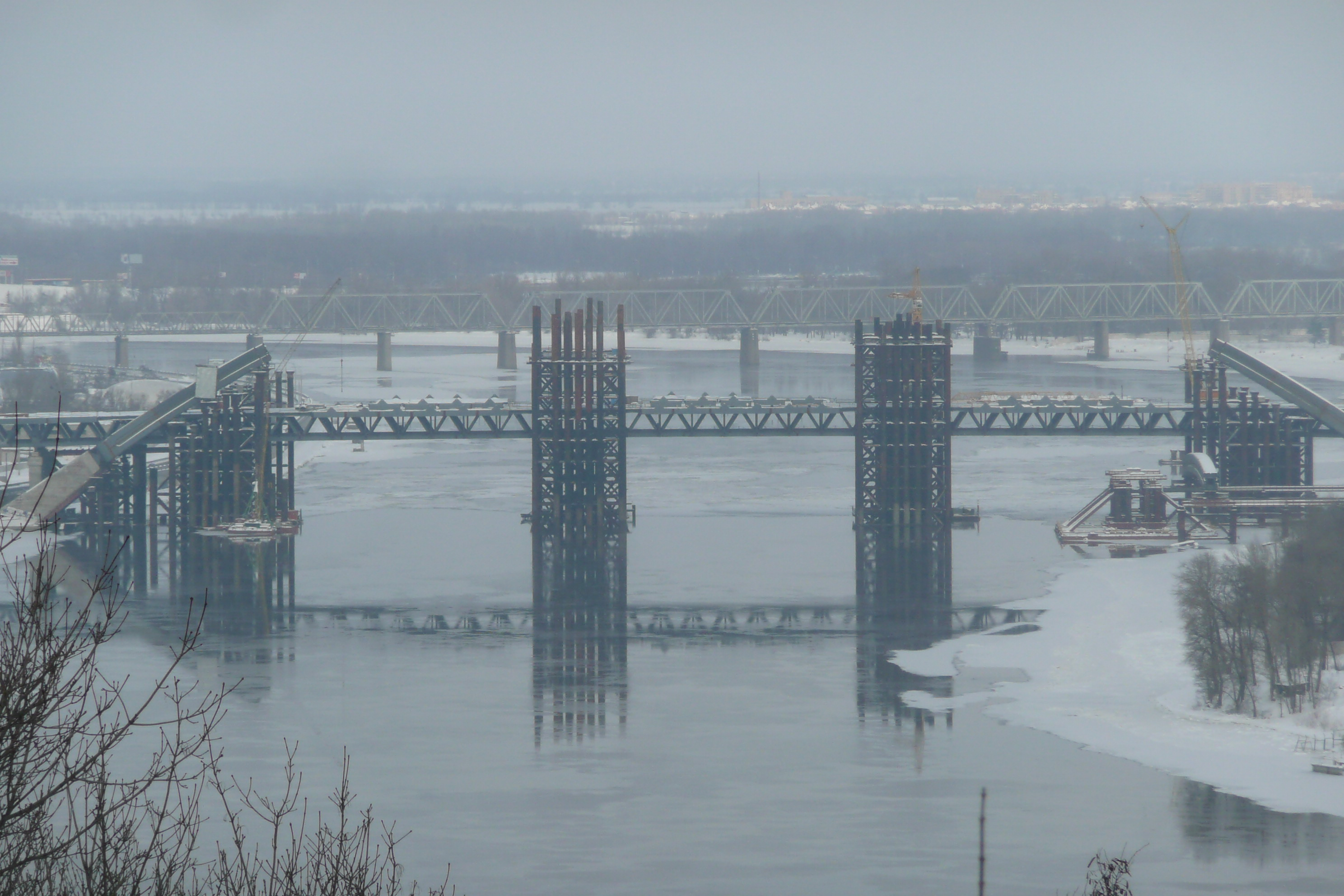
Construction of the Podilsko-Voskresensky Bridge in 2010

Due to a large traffic increase since the late 1990s, more bridges are needed to avoid traffic jams on and around already existing bridges. Specifically, the central rail route from the central railway terminal via the Darnytskyi Bridge is overloaded, limiting the railroad traffic in Eastern Europe.

Two bridges are currently under construction (one, the New Darnytskyi Bridge, already operational) and one more is planned according to the Kyiv Development Plan. In addition, in 2006 a project was unveiled to provide decorative night illumination to most of the bridges.

==== Podilskyi Bridge ====
The construction of a new 7 km (4 mi) long metro/automobile bridge (50°28′18″N 30°32′40″E) across Trukhaniv Ostriv, on the midway between existing Rybalskyi Rail Bridge and Parkovyi Bridge, was included into Kyiv's urban development plan in the 1980s. Major construction on the site started in 2003 and was planned to finish in 5 years, however the project lagged due to lack of funding. The construction was contracted by the Kyiv municipality and sponsored from the city budget, being accompanied by a number of corruption scandals. In 2023 the bridge was opened for bus traffic, and in December 2024 movement of private transport was opened. As of 2025 works on the left-bank section of the bridge have been ongoing, with the project being 88% complete. The bridge is a part of the future Podilsko-Vyhurivska Line, and it will carry 3 lanes of auto traffic in both directions.

== Alternatives to bridges ==
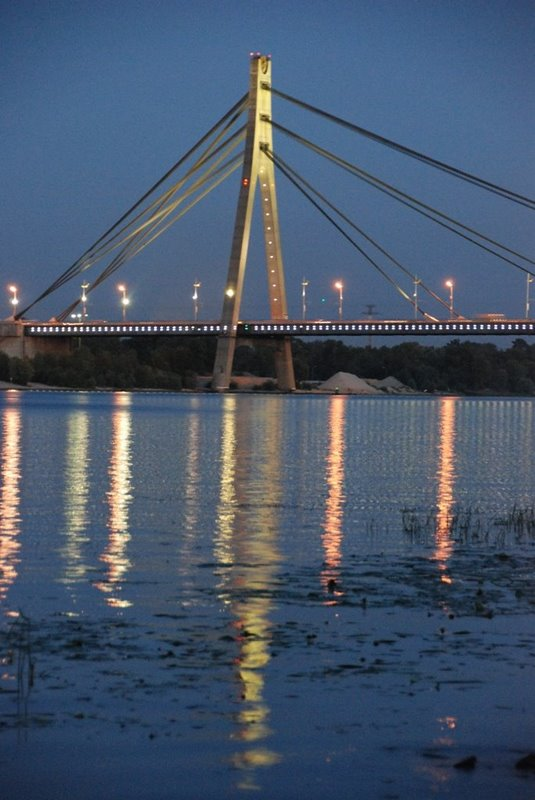
Pivnichnyi Bridge in evening

=== Tunnel projects ===
Despite the mid-20th century failure, the idea of under-river tunnels, which is relied on much advanced metro technologies, is still on Kyiv city planner's table. Tunnel projects are recently being included in some of proposed Kyiv development plans as a way to move the main traffic flows in the city center underground. However, most experts agree that such projects are both unaffordable and technically infeasible at this time.

Recently, Kyivavtodor road company and the institutes of Kyivdormostproekt and Kyivproekt were working out plans for a tunnel system which would connect the left and right banks of Kyiv. City authorities welcomed the plan, which would ease the traffic congestion of Kyiv's bridges.

=== Emergency bridges ===
In case of war/terrorism emergency, the makeshift pontoon bridges are to be established in the city. A special Pontoon-Bridge Brigade of the Armed Forces is based on the Left Bank, ready to use its truck-based automatic bridges and docking boats. Such equipment allows automobile and limited railroad connection over the river, and is frequently used in military maneuvers.

== See also ==
- Bridge over Institute Street
- Kyiv Glass Bridge
- Small Ring Road, Kyiv
- Great Ring Road, Kyiv
