= Struve Railroad Bridge =

Struve Railroad Bridge Железнодорожный мост Струве
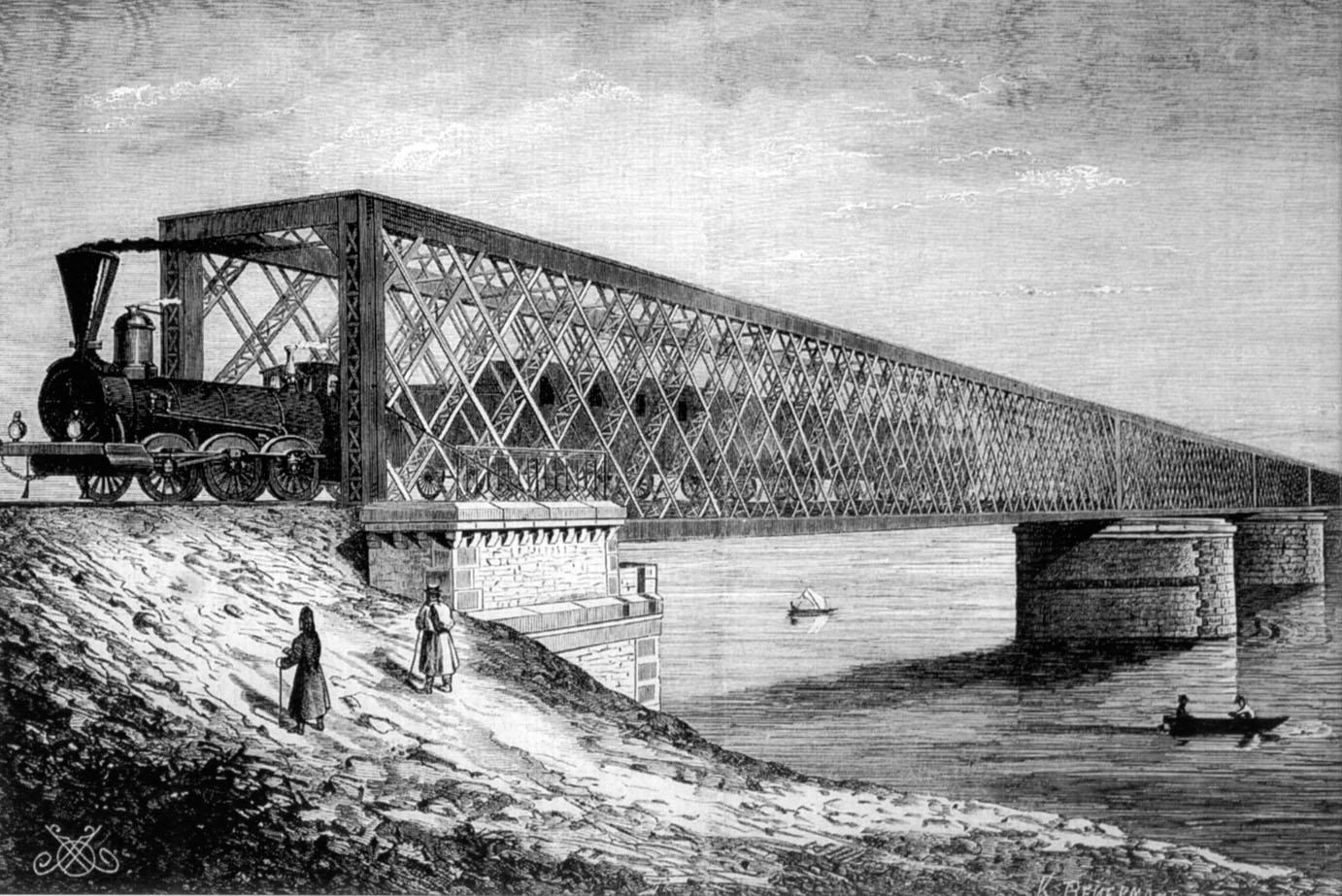
- Kyiv Railway Bridge (1870)
- Coordinates: 50°24′59″N 30°35′09″E
- Crosses: Dnieper
- Locale: Kyiv, Russian Empire
- Official name: Railroad Bridge of Amand Struve

Characteristics
- Design: Truss bridge
- Total length: 1,068 metres (3,504 ft)
- Longest span: 89 metres (292 ft)

History
- Construction start: March 1868
- Construction end: February 1870
- Opened: February 17, 1870
- Closed: June 1920 (destroyed)

Location
- Interactive map of Struve Railroad Bridge; Железнодорожный мост Струве

The Struve Railroad Bridge (Russian: Железнодорожный мост Струве; Ukrainian: Залізничний міст Струве), was the first all-metal railroad bridge over the Dnieper in Kyiv; it existed from 1855 to 1920. The bridge was one of the longest in the Russian Empire, yielding in length only to the bridges in Syzran and Yekaterinoslav (present-day Dnipro).

== History ==
It was the second stationary bridge over Dnieper with the construction supervision conducted personally by Amand Struve. This railroad truss bridge was initially named after its constructor, engineer Struve. Standing on 13 piers, it consisted of a dozen 292-feet-long sections resulting in a size of some 480 sazhens (1440 fathoms). During the construction Struve used the first caisson method in the Russian Empire to lay the foundation. 243 pood of iron (3,000 tonnes) was used for its construction. Each of the sections were tested to hold 18,000 pood. The total cost of the project was 3,200 thousands rubles. Captain Struve was promoted to colonel for the construction of the bridge. During this period of time (1860s-1870s) Struve was involved in various other construction projects as well, such as the installation and improvement of the city's utilities network.

On February 17, 1870 the first train by the Kyiv-Kursk Railways company crossed the bridge to the Kyiv railroad station. However, regular traffic was not officially opened until April 4, 1870, after the consecration of the bridge. Similarly to the Nicholas Chain Bridge, the Struve Bridge survived the Great and Civil wars but was blown up in 1920 by retreating Polish troops (see: Kiev offensive).

Today, the newly built New Darnytskyi Bridge stands next to the former Struve's bridge.

== See also ==
- Bridges in Kyiv

== Bibliography ==
- Rybakov, M.O. Nevidomi ta malovidomi storinky istoriï Kyi︠e︡va (Unknown and not-well-known pages of Kiev's history). "Kyi". Kiev, 1997. ISBN 966-7161-15-3
- Anisimov, A. Sad ignorance. "Tabachuk Ltd." Kiev, 1992.
