= Rusanivskyi Bridge =

Coordinates: 50°26′53″N 30°35′04″E

The Rusanivskyi Bridge (Русанівський міст) was a bridge spanning the Rusanivka Channel of the Dnieper River on the Brovary Highway; from 1906 to 1943, it connected Trukhaniv Island with Mykilska Slobidka. It was located within the current city limits of Kyiv.

== History ==
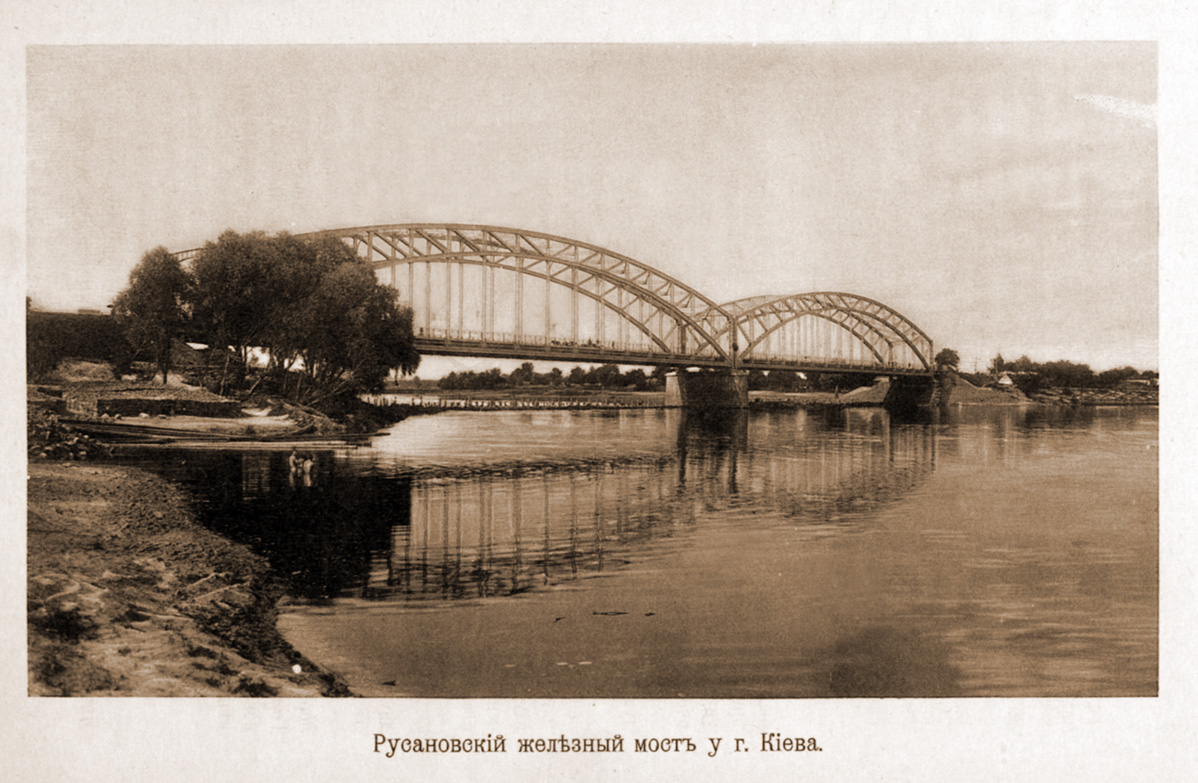
Rusanivskyi Bridge (illustration from a 1913 book)

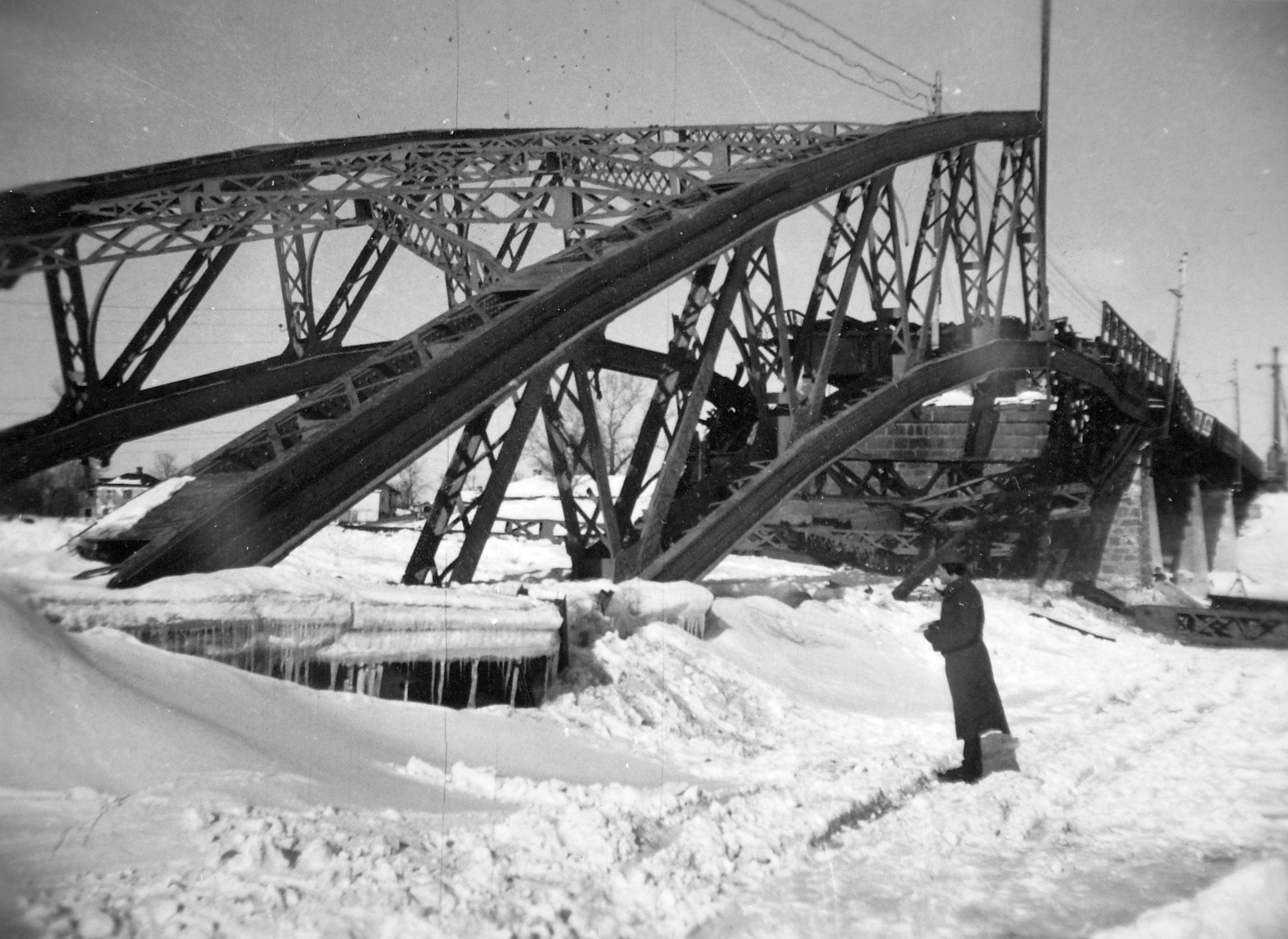
Destroyed Rusanivskyi Bridge, winter 1942

During the construction of the Mykolaivskyi Chain Bridge in the mid-19th century, four wooden bridges were built to provide access to Mykilska Slobidka and the Brovary Highway. These bridges were frequently destroyed during spring floods.

Between 1903 and 1906, a metal bridge was constructed across the channel to replace the wooden ones The project was designed by engineers Mykola Bieleliubskyi and Hryhorii Kryvoshein, along with architect Volodymyr Apyshkov.

The new bridge featured two spans, each measuring 101.35 meters (47.5 sazhens) in length. A distinctive feature was the design of the load-bearing structures as metal two-hinged arches, rising 9.81 meters (4.6 sazhens) above the supports and 17.07 meters (8 sazhens) at the center of the span. The roadway—8.08 meters (3.8 sazhens) wide—and the two sidewalks—each 1.28 meters (0.6 sazhens) wide—were constructed of wood. The bridge was enclosed by metal railings standing 1.07 meters (1.5 arshins) high.

Traffic across the bridge opened on 11(24) October 1906.

On 7(20) July 1908, the bridge's wooden decking burned down. The following day, the Mykolaivskyi Chain Bridge also caught fire, though the blaze there was quickly extinguished. An investigation determined that the fires on both bridges were the result of arson. The bridge decking was repaired shortly thereafter, and traffic resumed on 13(26) July 1908, under a temporary arrangement. Security at the bridges was stepped up to prevent further arson attacks. Major repairs to the wooden road surface and the metal components damaged by the fire were carried out between May and September 1909. In 1912, a petrol-powered tram service to Darnytsia began operating across the renovated bridge.

In June 1920, the Rusanivskyi Bridge—like all other Kyiv bridges spanning the Dnipro—was destroyed by retreating Polish troops. It was rebuilt between 1924 and 1925 based on a design by Professor Yevhen Paton. The tram line was electrified in the 1930s.

The bridge was blown up during the Red Army's retreat in September 1941. The Germans did not rebuild it, as it held no strategic value without a bridge spanning the main channel of the Dnipro. It was not restored in the post-war period either. In 1945 the metal structures were dismantled, and the remains of the spans were removed.

In 1965, the Rusanivskyi Metro Bridge was built on the site to accommodate the left-bank section of the Sviatoshynsko-Brovarska metro line.

== See also ==
- Bridges in Kyiv
