= Pivdennyi Bridge =

Pivdennyi Bridge may refer to:

- Pivdennyi Bridge (Dnipro), a bridge in Dnipro
- Pivdennyi Bridge (Kyiv), a bridge in Kyiv
