= Vydubychi =

Neighborhood of Kyiv, Ukraine

Vydubychi (also Vydobychi, Vudobych, Vydobech) (Ukrainian: Видубичі) is a historical neighborhood in Ukrainian capital Kyiv. Geographically constituting a hill and a valley on the Right (western) Bank of the Dnipro River, it is now a part of the Pechersk district of the city.

The real revival of the monastery took place in the second half of the seventeenth century, when the Cossack elders built churches and gave generous gifts for the development of the church. Paul of Aleppo wrote about the enthusiasm that prevailed in Ukraine in the middle of the seventeenth century: "The people are triumphant, they believe in the beginning of a peaceful life and are in a hurry to restore their homes, fortifications, and churches." The traveler witnessed the restoration of St. Michael's Cathedral in Vydubychi. In the 1690s, Starodubsky Colonel Mykhailo Myklashevsky, following the lead of Hetman Ivan Mazepa, who was a great builder and patron of the arts, built St. George's Church, the Savior's Refectory, and a two-story fraternal building in the Vydubychi Monastery. In 1727-1733, Hetman Danylo Apostol built the entrance gate, bell tower, and stone wall around the monastery.

The lower part of Vydubychi has evolved into a giant intermodal transport hub comprising the Kyiv Metro Syretsko–Pecherska line Vydubychi metro station, two railway stops Vydubychi railway station serving east bound trains, the Kyiv Urban Electric Train and the Kyiv Boryspil Express, and Vydubychi-Trypilski serving south bound trains, the Vydubychi bus terminal, two multi-level grade-separated interchanges: motorway interchange and railway interchange. The Vydubychi hub adjoins two major bridges: the Pivdennyi Bridge and New Darnytskyi Bridge.

The Vydubychi Monastery with its beautiful hill park is located in the neighborhood.

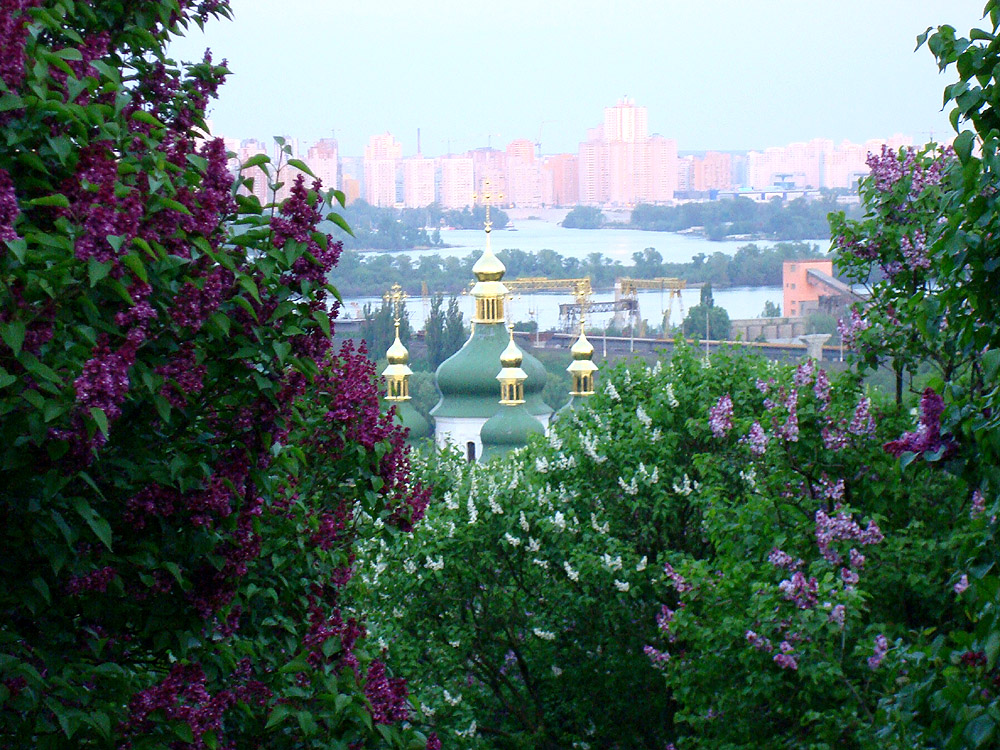

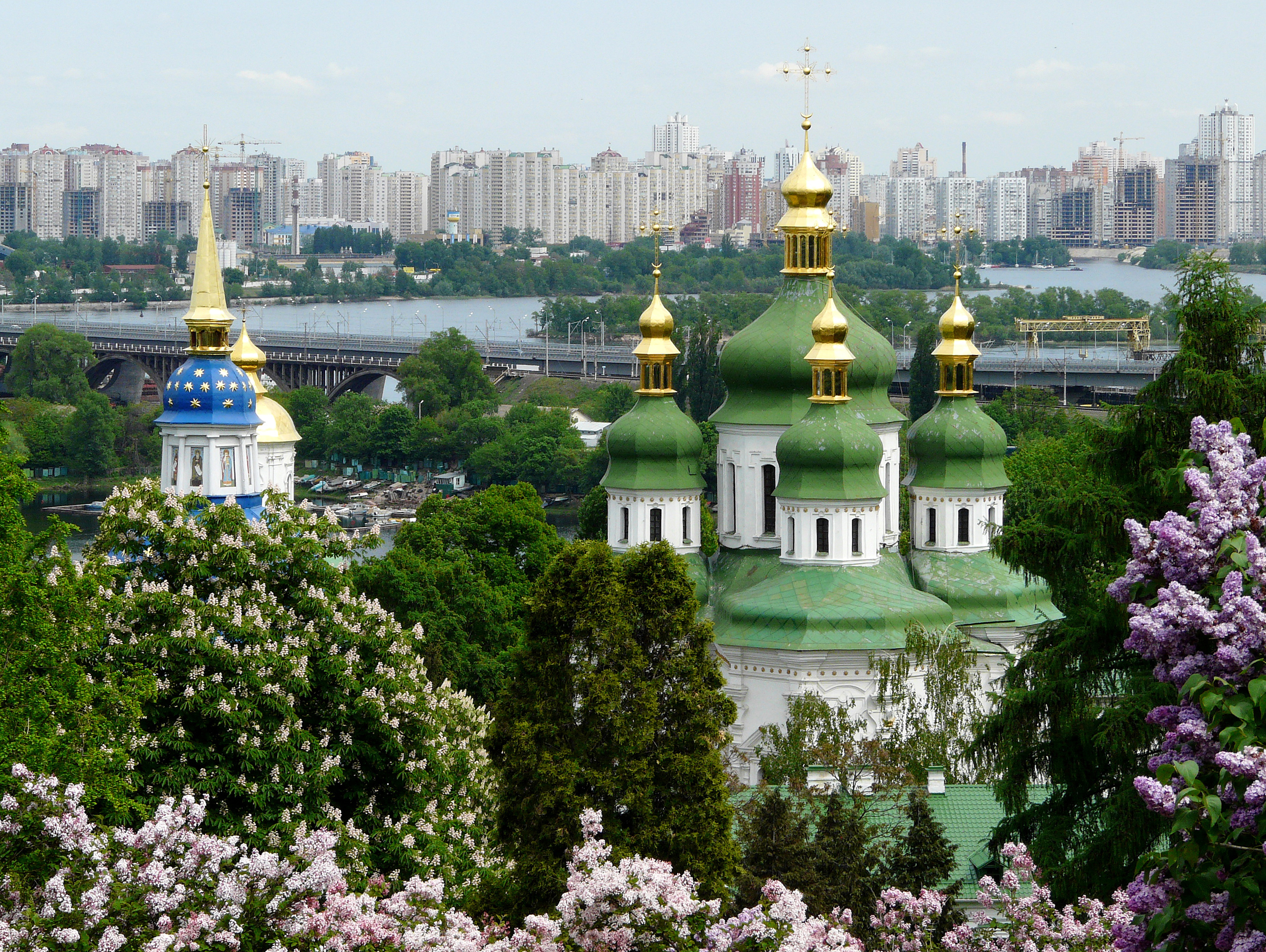

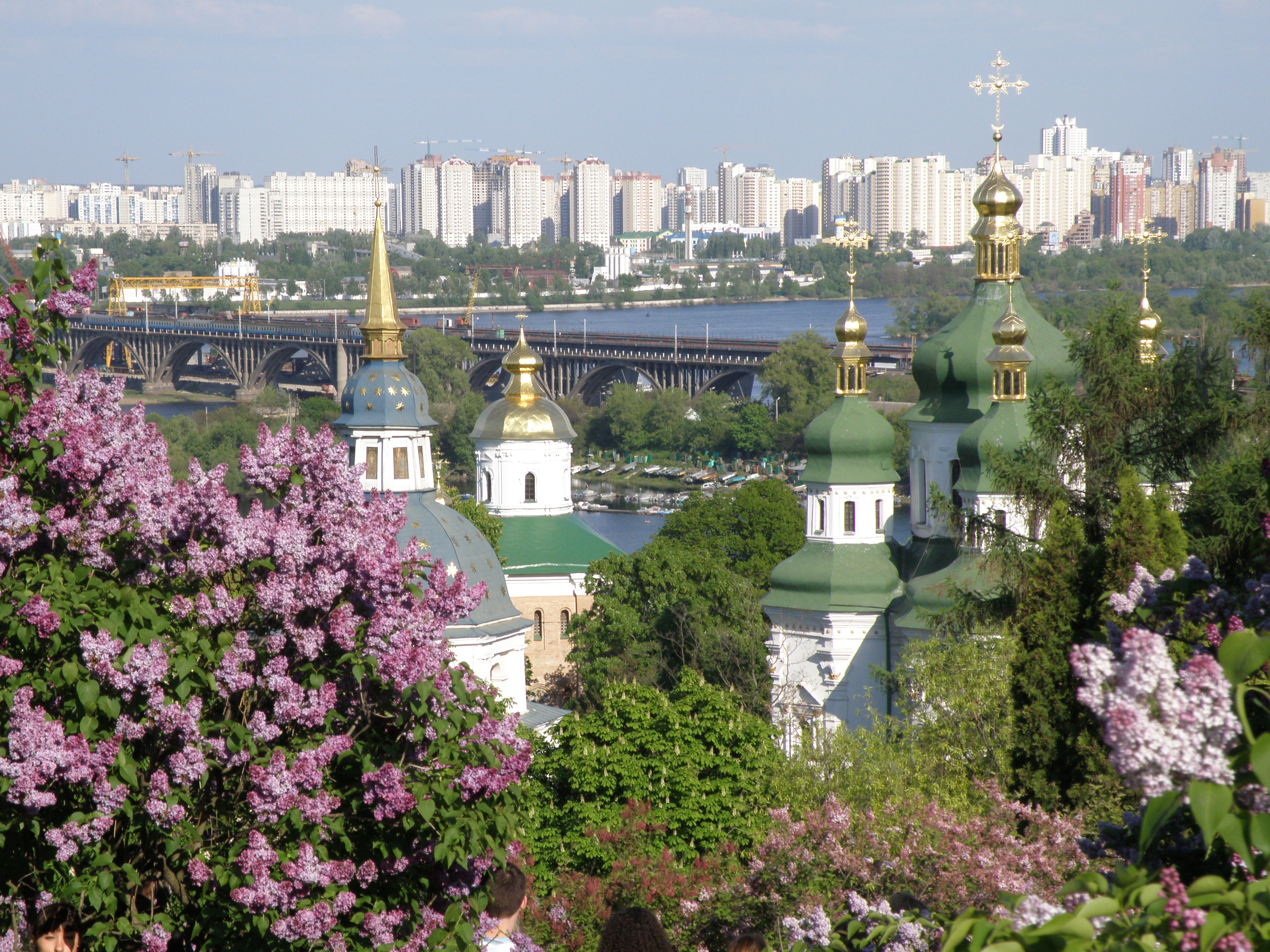

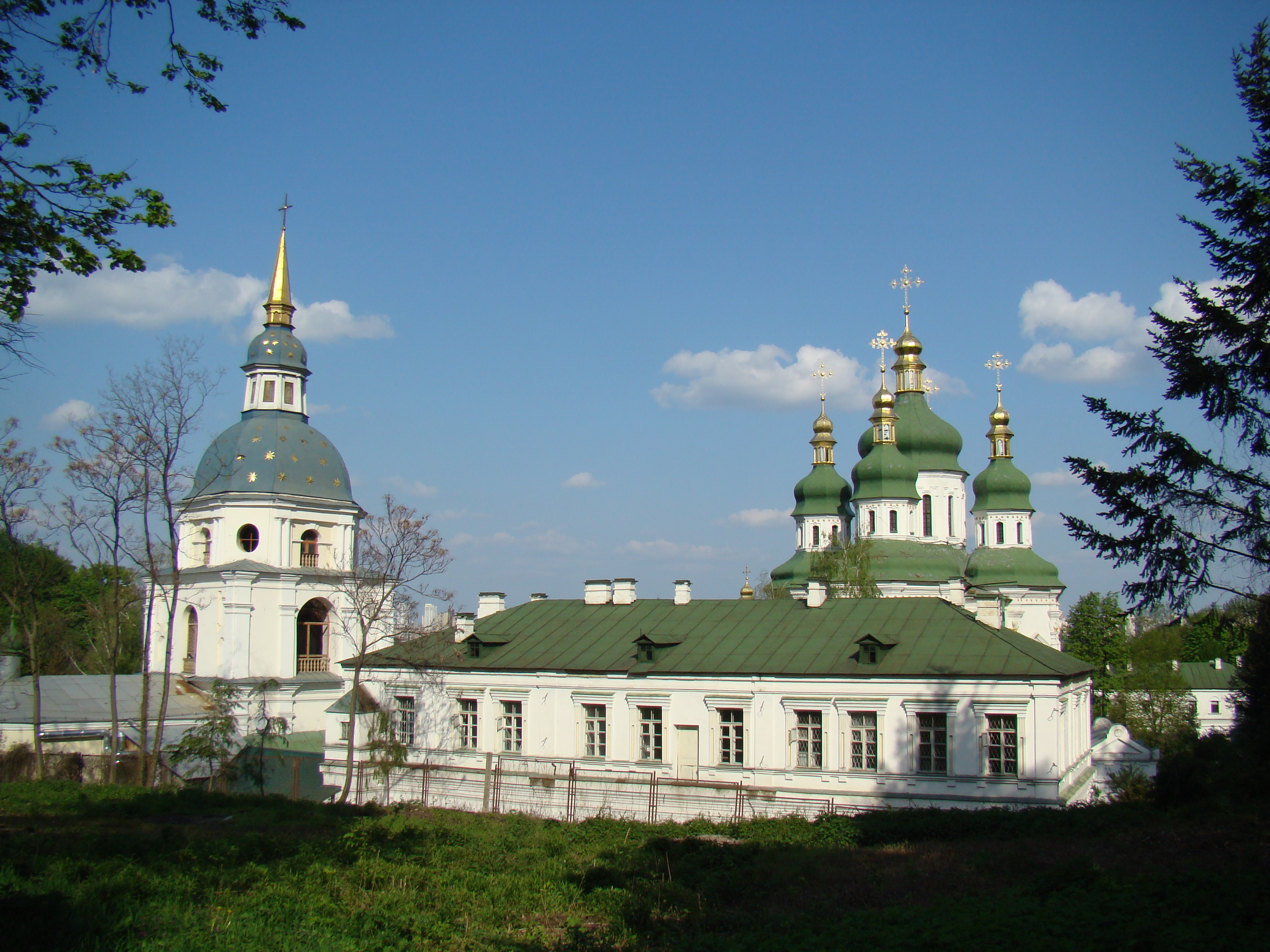
