= Borys Paton =

Ukrainian scientist (1918–2020)

Hero of Ukraine Borys Paton
- Борис Патон
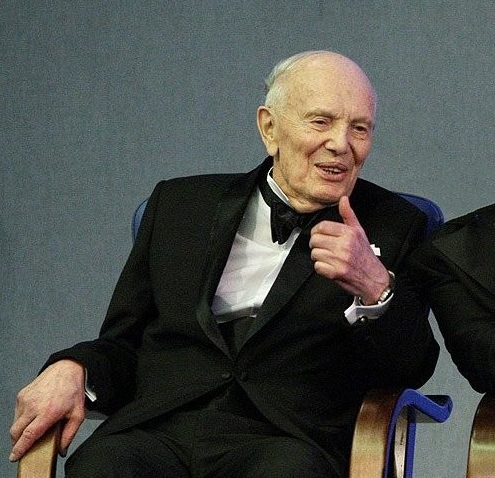
- Paton in 2010
- Born: 27 November 1918; Kyiv, Ukrainian State
- Died: 19 August 2020 (aged 101); Kyiv, Ukraine
- Education: Kyiv Polytechnic Institute
- Known for: Studies in metallurgy of electrical welding; President of National Academy of Sciences of Ukraine (since 1962)
- Spouse: Olha Paton
- Children: Yevhenia
- Awards: Hero of Socialist Labor (twice); Hero of Ukraine; Lomonosov Gold Medal
- Scientific career
- Fields: Metallurgy
- Workplaces: Paton Electrical-Welding Institute, International Association of Science Academies, National Academy of Sciences of Ukraine

Borys Yevhenovych Paton (Ukrainian: Борис Євгенович Патон; 27 November 1918 – 19 August 2020) was a Ukrainian scientist and a long-time chairman of the National Academy of Sciences of Ukraine. He was appointed to this post in 1962 and held it until his death. Paton, like his father Evgeny Paton, was famous for his work in electric welding.

== Biography ==
Paton was born on 27 November 1918 in Kyiv in the family of scientist and founder of the Paton Institute of Electric Welding in Kyiv, Professor Evgeny Paton. Evgeny Paton was (like his son) famous for his works in electric welding. The first welded bridge in Kyiv, Paton Bridge, was constructed under the supervision of, and named after, Evgeny Paton. Paton junior's mother was a housewife. Paton junior was born in the professors’ residence building of Kyiv Polytechnic Institute, where his father was teaching. In 1941, Borys Paton completed the Kyiv Polytechnic Institute and became an engineer.

During the Second World War, in 1941 and 1942, Paton worked and designed electric circuits at the Krasnoye Sormovo Factory No. 112 in Gorky. His designs helped to increase Soviet tank production.

Paton had a doctoral degree in technical sciences after he defended his doctoral dissertation in 1952. In 1952 Paton joined the Communist Party of the Soviet Union. In 1953 he became head of the Paton Institute of Electric Welding. (The institute founded and formerly led by his father.)

Paton joined the National Academy of Sciences of Ukraine on 18 November 1958. From 1963 to 1991, he was a member of the Academy of Sciences of the Soviet Union. Paton was appointed chairman of the National Academy of Sciences of Ukraine in 1962 and held this position until his death. Paton was also offered to head the Academy of Sciences of the Soviet Union in Moscow, but he refused. He was convinced that he should work in Kyiv, at his parents' Institute of Electric Welding and the Ukrainian Academy of Sciences.

Paton was a deputy of the Supreme Soviet of the Soviet Union from 1962 to 1989.

In the early 1970s and 1980s Paton had advised the Soviet authorities not to build the Chernobyl Nuclear Power Plant.

In 1998 Paton was the first person to have been awarded the title of the Hero of Ukraine.

In January 2008 Paton was appointed member of the National Security and Defense Council of Ukraine by a decree of President Viktor Yushchenko. In the 2010 Ukrainian presidential election he was a proxy for candidate Yulia Tymoshenko. In August 2011 Paton was one of the ten signatories of the so-called "Letter of Ten", a letter from Ukrainian intelligentsia figures in support of the policy of President Viktor Yanukovych.

Paton was last re-appointed for another term as chairman of the National Academy of Sciences of Ukraine in 2015. Paton did not submit his candidacy for the post in March 2020, which signified that he was leaving the position.

Paton never fully denounced Ukraine's past as part of the Soviet Union. (Note: Ukraine was part of the Soviet Union from 1920 until Ukraine declared its independence from the Soviet Union on 24 August 1991.) In 2019 he declared he was against decommunization policies.

Paton died on 19 August 2020 aged 101. He was buried at Baikove Cemetery three days later.

Borys Paton was the author of more than 1,000 publications, including 20 monographs and responsible for more than 400 inventions.

== Family ==
Paton was married to Olha Paton and had a daughter, Yevheniya, who was also a scientist. Yevheniya died in 2009 and four years later, his wife died. After the death of his wife, Paton was cared for by his granddaughter, Olha.

== Research activities ==
Paton devoted his scientific research to

- automatic and semi-automatic submerged arc welding
- development of theoretical foundations for the creation of automatic and semi-automatic machines for electric arc welding and welding power supplies
- research for conditions of long arc burning and its regulation
- solving the problems of management of welding processes
- creation of new functional materials

Under his leadership, electroslag welding was created which became a fundamentally new method of welding. Paton led research on the application of welding heat sources for the improvement of the quality of the smelted metal. On this basis a new branch of metallurgy was founded called special electrometallurgy (electroslag, plasma arc welding and electron-beam remelting). He was the first researcher to start intensive research in the field of the use of welding and related technologies in space.

== Honours and awards ==
Ukraine

- Hero of Ukraine (26 November 1998) – for dedicated service to science, outstanding achievements in the field of welding and special electrometallurgy, which contributed to the recognition and approval of the authority of Soviet science in the world.
- Order of Liberty (21 January 2012)
- Order of Prince Yaroslav the Wise:
  - 1st class (27 November 2008) – for many years of untiring service to the science, outstanding personal contribution to strengthening the scientific and economic potential of Ukraine
  - 2nd class (December 7, 2018) – for a significant personal contribution to the development of national science, strengthening the scientific and technical potential of the Ukrainian state, many years of fruitful work and on the occasion of the 100th anniversary of the founding of the National Academy of Sciences of Ukraine.
  - 4th class (26 November 2003) – for outstanding personal contribution to the development of domestic science, strengthening scientific and technological capacities and on the occasion of the 85th anniversary of the National Academy of Sciences of Ukraine
  - 5th class (13 May 1997) – for outstanding personal contribution to the Ukrainian state in the development of science, the approval authority of the national academic school in the world
- State Prize of Ukraine (2004)
- Honour of the President of Ukraine (1993)

Soviet Union

- Hero of Socialist Labour, twice (1969, 1978); this award includes the installation of a bust of the recipient – Paton – in his home town of Kyiv; it was sculpted by Olexandr Skoblikov in 1982 and it is installed in front of academic museums at 15 Bogdan Khmelnitsky
- Four Orders of Lenin (1967, 1969, 1975, 1978)
- Order of the October Revolution (1984)
- Order of the Red Banner of Labour (1943)
- Order of Friendship of Peoples (1988)
- Lenin Prize (1957)
- Stalin Prize (1950)
- Award of the Council of Ministers of the USSR (1988, 1984)
- Honoured Worker of Science and Technology of the Ukrainian SSR (1968)
- Honoured Inventor of the USSR (1983)
- Lomonosov Gold Medal (1981)
- Member of the Central Committee of the 27th Congress of the Communist Party of the Soviet Union (1986–1990)

Russian

- Order "For Merit to the Fatherland";
  - 1st class (Russia, 26 November 2008) – for outstanding contribution to world science, strengthening the scientific and cultural relations between the states – members of the Commonwealth of Independent States
  - 2nd class (Russia, 27 November 1998) – for outstanding contribution to science
- Order of Honour (Russia, 19 January 2004) – for outstanding contribution to science and to strengthen friendship and cooperation between Russia and Ukraine

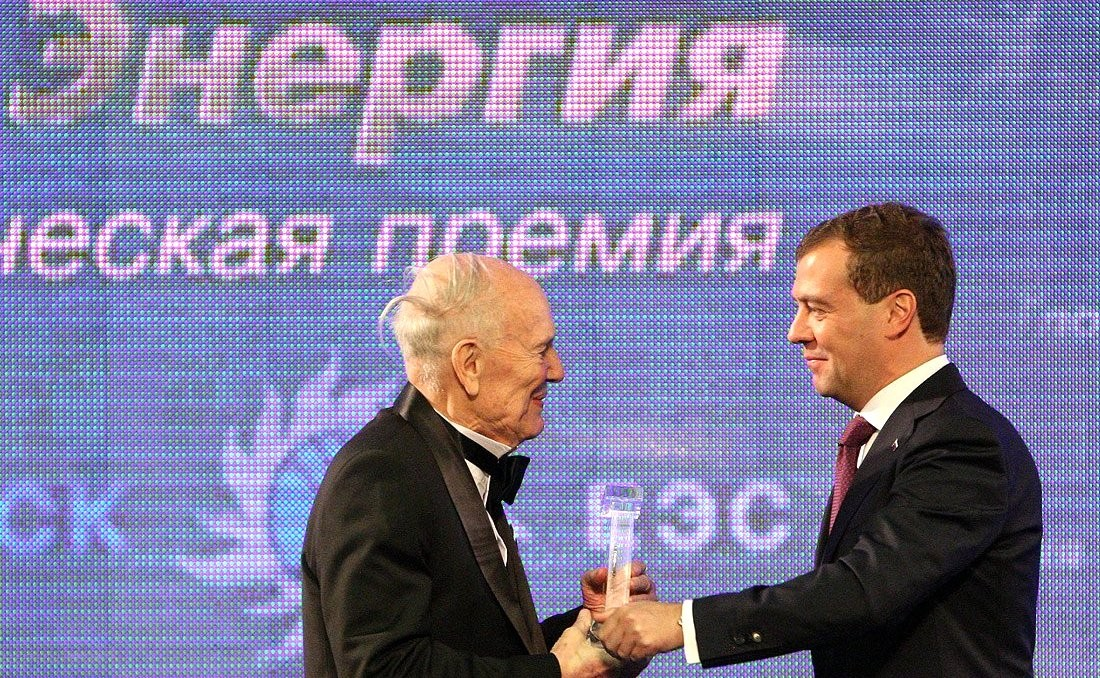
Russian President Dmitry Medvedev awarded of Global Energy Prize in Saint Petersburg, 18 June 2010

Other

- 2020: IEEE Honorary Membership
- Korolev Gold Medal (2003)
- Czochralski Gold Medal (2006)
- Honorary Citizen of Mariupol (1998) – for outstanding service to Mariupol
- Professor Emeritus of Moscow Institute of Physics and Technology (2003)
- Global Energy Prize (2010)
- Honorary member of the Academy of Sciences of Moldova

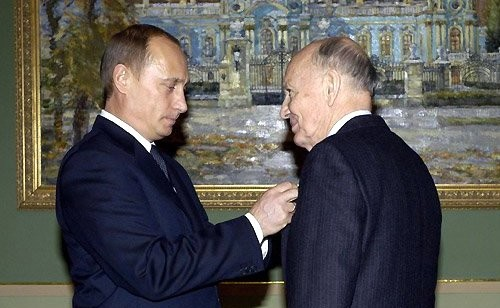
Russian President Vladimir Putin awarded of Order of Honour in Kyiv, 23 January 2004

== Notes ==
Preceded by Aleksandr Palladin	President of NANU; 1962–2020	Succeeded by Anatoliy Zahorodniy
