= Paton Institute of Electric Welding =

Ukrainian research institute

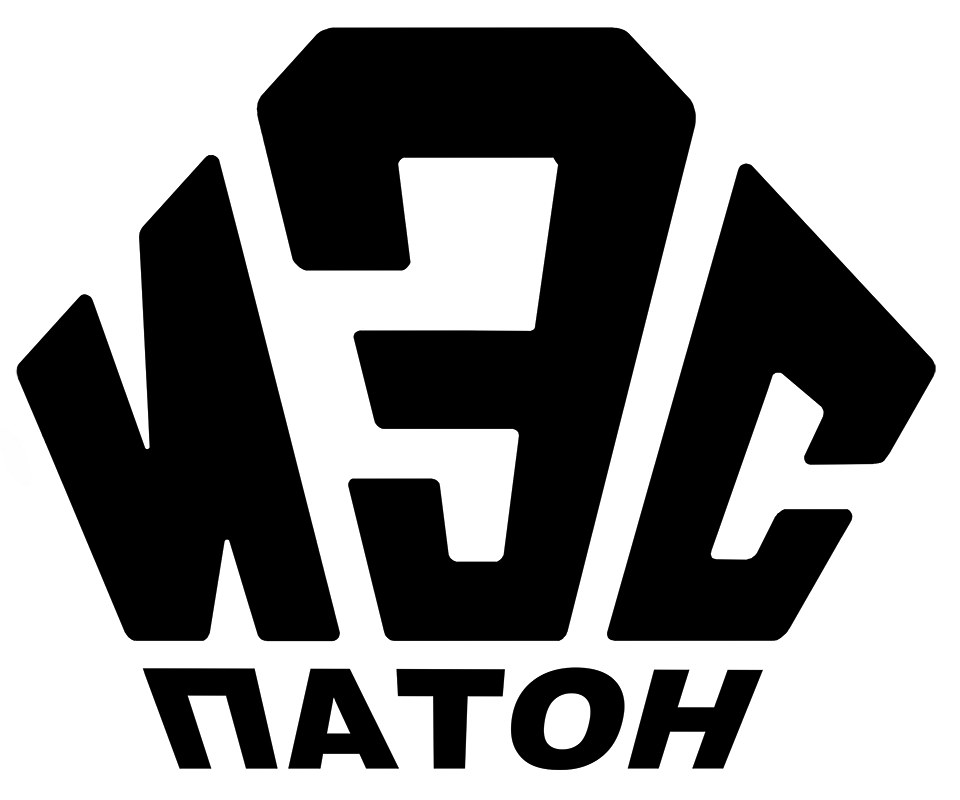
Institute's logo (Cyrillic lettering)

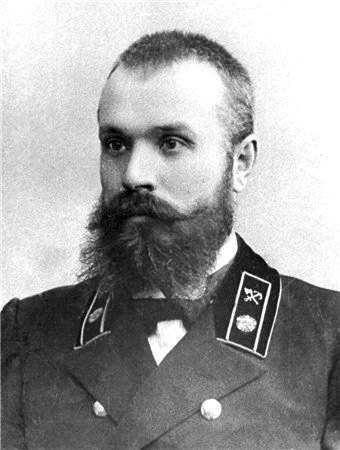
Yevgeniy Paton

E. O. Paton Electric Welding Institute (Ukrainian: Інститут електрозварювання ім. Є. О. Патона, romanized: Insytut elektrozvariuvannia im. Ye. O. Patona) is a welding research institution situated in Kyiv, Ukraine. It is named after its founder, Professor Evgeny Paton.

== History ==
The institute was established in 1934 following the decree of the Ukrainian Academy of Sciences. The institute was formed from the Laboratories of the State Electric Welding Committee and Electric Welding Department of Kyiv Polytechnic Institute in 1934. Until 1991 it was known as the Ukrainian SSR Academy of Sciences Electric Welding Institute. The first leader of the institute was Evgeny Paton.

For many years the institute was directed by Evgeny Paton's son, Borys Paton. Since 2020 following Borys Paton's death the institute is led by Ihor Krivtsun

Currently the institute research staff includes 70 Doctor of Science, 250 Kandidats of Science. The institute is the main Ukrainian research facility dealing with electric welding and electrical discharge machining.

== Directors ==
- 1934 – 1953 Yevgeniy Paton
- 1953 – 2020 Borys Paton, a chairman of the National Academy of Sciences of Ukraine
- 2020 – Ihor Krivtsun
