= Navodnytskyi Bridge =

Coordinates: 50°25′40″N 30°34′55″E

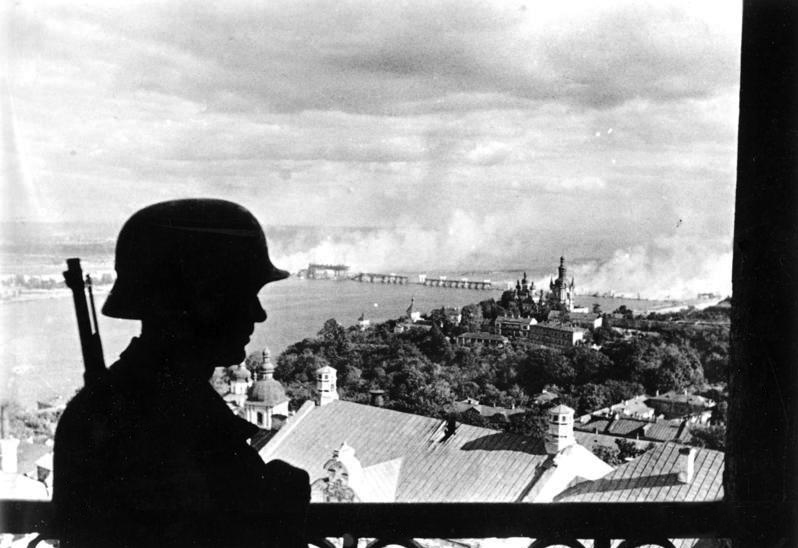
In the background, the wooden Navodnytskyi Bridge is burning (photograph from September 1941).

Наводни́цький міст (Navodnytskyi Bridge) is the collective name for several bridges across the Dnieper that existed in Kyiv between 1713 and 1953.

According to historical chronicles, one of Kyiv's main river crossings existed on the Dnieper near the mouth of the Lybid River as early as the 10th and 11th centuries. By the 16th century, the Navodnytskyi crossing operated at this location, consisting of two ferries and a wooden bridge over the Telbin (which was a Dnieper inlet at the time).

Construction of the state-owned Navodnytskyi pontoon bridge began in 1713; it was dismantled during the spring ice drift.

In 1744, a permanent wooden bridge—450 sazhens long and featuring cables twisted from willow withies—was built; it was owned by the Kyiv-Pechersk Lavra.

== Strategic Bridge ==
In 1915, at the outbreak of World War I, a strategic wooden bridge on a pile foundation was built here; it was burned down on June 9, 1920, by retreating Polish troops on the orders of General Edward Śmigły-Rydz. It was rebuilt in March 1921. The bridge was damaged during the spring flood of 1931 and rebuilt in 1932. The bridge was finally destroyed in September 1941.

== The 1930s Project ==
A design was developed in the mid-1930s, and construction began in 1939 on a permanent metal bridge featuring caisson-based piers and a through-girder system with short spans—a design that allowed for the rapid replacement of damaged components (designed by engineer V. M. Vakhurkin and architect K. M. Yakovlev).

Construction was not completed by the outbreak of the war. Consequently, under German occupation, a temporary structure known as the "von Reichenau Bridge" (German: Brücke von Reichenau)—marked on a 1943 map and named after the German field marshal Walther von Reichenau—was built upon the existing piers. This bridge was blown up during the battles for Kyiv in the autumn of 1943.

== Post-War Temporary Bridges ==
Following the liberation of Kyiv in November 1943, Soviet Army sapper units constructed the low-level Navodnytskyi Bridge, which remained in service until the spring of 1944. A high-level bridge was in operation from 1944 onwards. The Navodnytskyi Bridge was dismantled shortly after the construction of the Paton Bridge in 1953. Today, only a few remnants of the old piers remain; they can sometimes be seen above the surface of the Dnieper River when water levels are low.

== Sculpture on the bridge's ice-breaker pier ==
On May 22, 2013, the sculpture "Rare Bird"—named after a quote from Nikolai Gogol's work "The Wondrous Dnieper"—was installed on the remains of the bridge's ice-breaker pier.

The sculpture is made entirely of welded black metal rods and is situated at the spot where sightseeing boats turn around. The work was created by sculptor Oleksiy Vladimirov.
