= Pivdennyi Bridge (Kyiv) =

Pivdennyi Bridge Південний міст
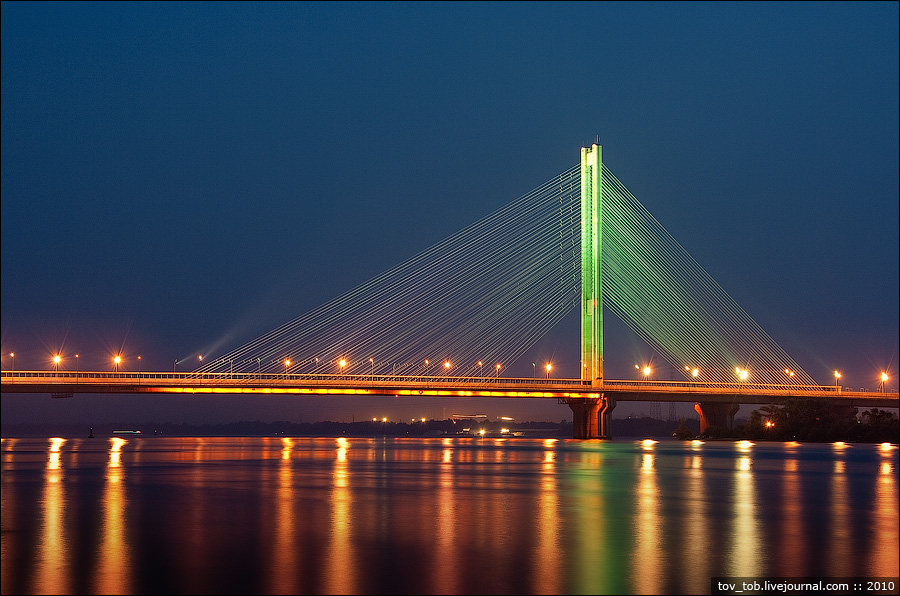
- Pivdennyi Bridge
- Coordinates: 50.39481°N 30.58814°E
- Carries: Road traffic, Metro
- Crosses: Dnieper River
- Locale: Kyiv, Ukraine
- Official name: Pivdennyi Bridge
- Owner: Ukraine
- Preceded by: New Darnytskyi Bridge

Characteristics
- Design: Cable-stayed bridge, Harp
- Material: Concrete, steel
- Total length: 1,256 metres (4,121 ft)
- Width: 41 metres (135 ft)
- Height: 133 metres (436 ft)
- Longest span: 270 metres (890 ft)

History
- Designer: Oleksiy Havrylov
- Engineering design by: Heorhiy Fuks
- Constructed by: Mostozahin No. 2 Mostozahin No. 3 Mostozahin No. 112; Mostobud No. 1
- Fabrication by: Kryvorizhstal; Zavod No. 50
- Construction start: 1983
- Opened: 25 December 1990

Statistics
- Daily traffic: 6 lanes total (3 each direction)

Location
- Interactive map of Pivdennyi Bridge

The Pivdennyi Bridge (Ukrainian: Південний міст [piu̯ˈdɛnːɪj ˈmist], lit. 'Southern bridge') is a bridge on the Dnieper River in Kyiv, Ukraine.

== History ==
The bridge was designed by the architect A. Gavrilov ("Mostobud") and a group of engineers headed by G. Fux. The 7 km (4 mi) long metro/automobile bridge was built in 1990. The main tower has a height of 113 metres, making it the highest bridge in the city.

It is the second metro bridge in Kyiv, serving both the Syretsko-Pecherska metro line and road traffic.

Due to insufficient funding of the object during the 1990s, as well as because of a significant increase in traffic, which the engineers responsible for the project were unable to predict, starting from the 2010s sections of the bridge have been frequently closed for traffic due to constant repair works.

In 2021 the bridge was determined to be in a limited operational state, resulting in emergency repair work. The bridge reopened on December 1, 2024, but was soon closed again from March 28, 2025 to August 1, 2025 for necessary repairs on the right-bank overpass.

Between 1 and 2 October 2026, Russian drones twice struck the bridge near the support structure. As a result, both the Pivdennyi Bridge and Paton Bridge were closed by the city of Kyiv pending a technical evaluation. Later in November, four Russian missiles hit the bridge.

== Construction ==
The main span of the bridge consists of metal sheets suspended on steel cables. Parts of the bridge beyond the main span are made of prefabricated concrete elements, which were transported by water and assembled on the spot. The whole construction project cost 112 million Soviet rubles, which was equal to $200 million at the time.

== Design ==
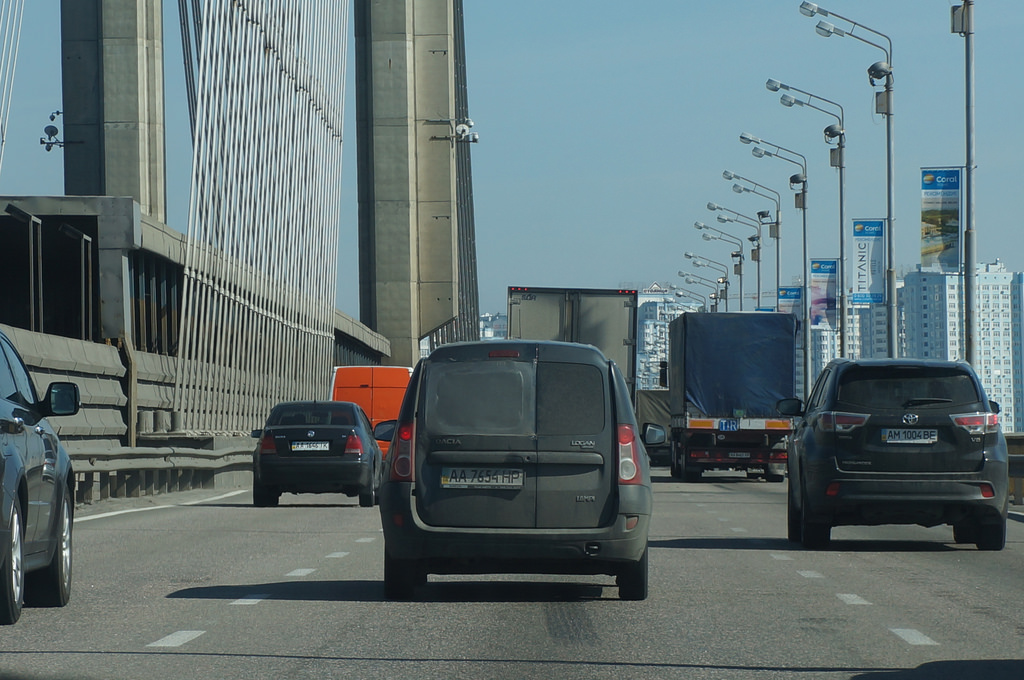
Traffic on Southern Bridge in Kyiv

The cables holding the spans on the bridge are supported by a ferroconcrete double-column pylon 135 m (443 ft) in height. The bridge currently has three traffic lanes and one metro track in both directions (total of six vehicle lanes and two rail tracks).

== Location ==
The bridge is part of the E40/M03 and is formally an extension of the local Promyslova Street.

== See also ==
- Bridges in Kyiv
