= Nicholas Chain Bridge =

Former bridge in Ukraine

Nicholas Chain Bridge Миколаївський ланцюговий міст (Ukrainian)
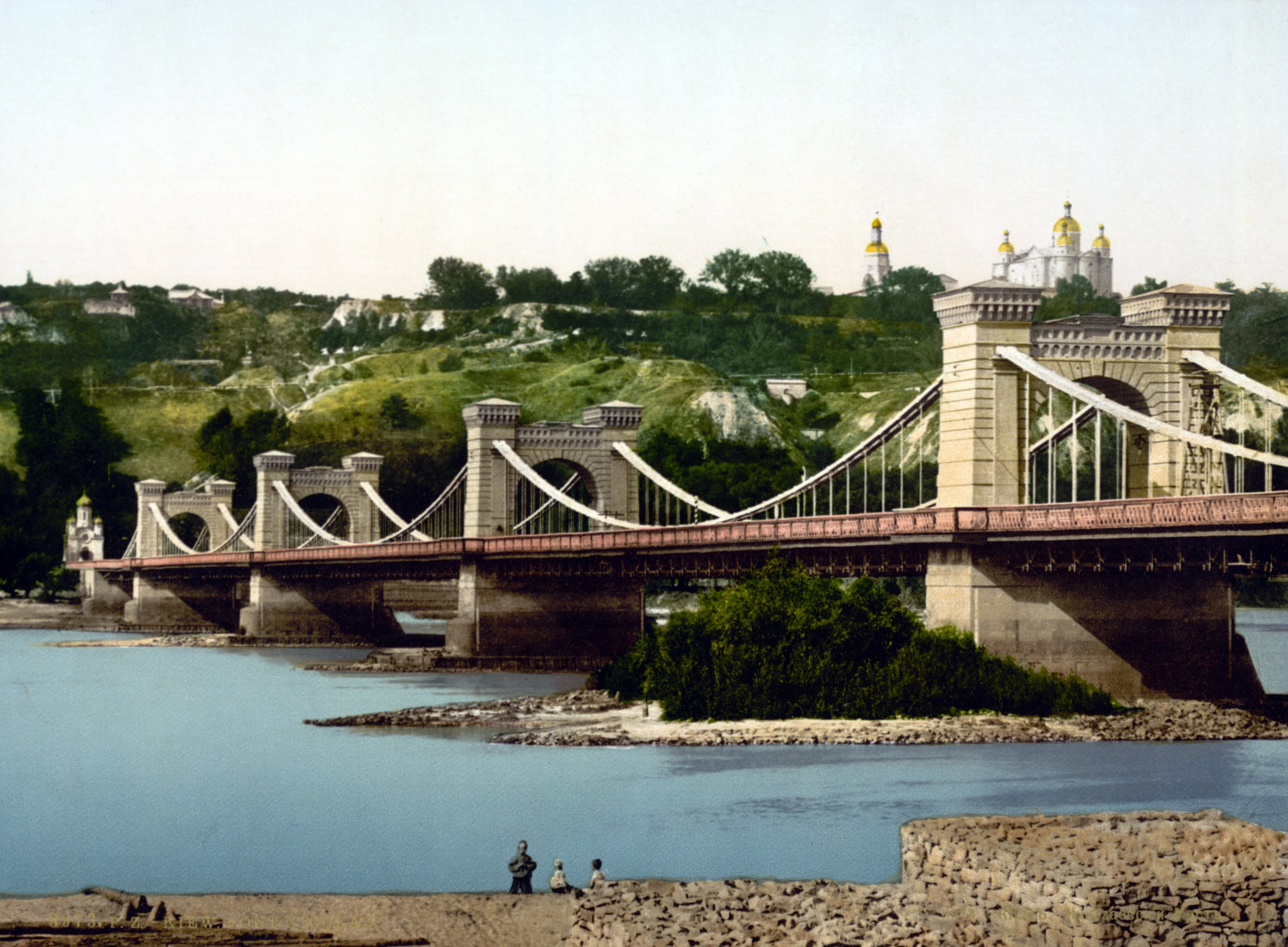
- Coordinates: 50°26′32″N 30°33′52.30″E
- Crosses: Dnieper
- Locale: Kyiv, Ukraine

Characteristics
- Design: Suspension bridge
- Longest span: 776 metres (2,546 ft)

History
- Construction start: 1848
- Construction end: 1853
- Closed: 1920 (destroyed)

Location
- Interactive map of Nicholas Chain Bridge

The Nicholas Chain Bridge or Mykolaivskyi Chain Bridge (Ukrainian: Миколаївський ланцюговий міст, romanized: Mykolaivskyi lantsiuhovyi mist, IPA: [mɪkoˈlɑjiu̯sʲkɪj lɐnʲtsʲʊˈɦɔwɪj ˈmist]; Russian: Николаевский цепной мост, romanized: Nikolayevskiy zepnoy most) was a chain bridge over the Dnieper that existed from 1855 to 1920 in Kyiv.

== History ==
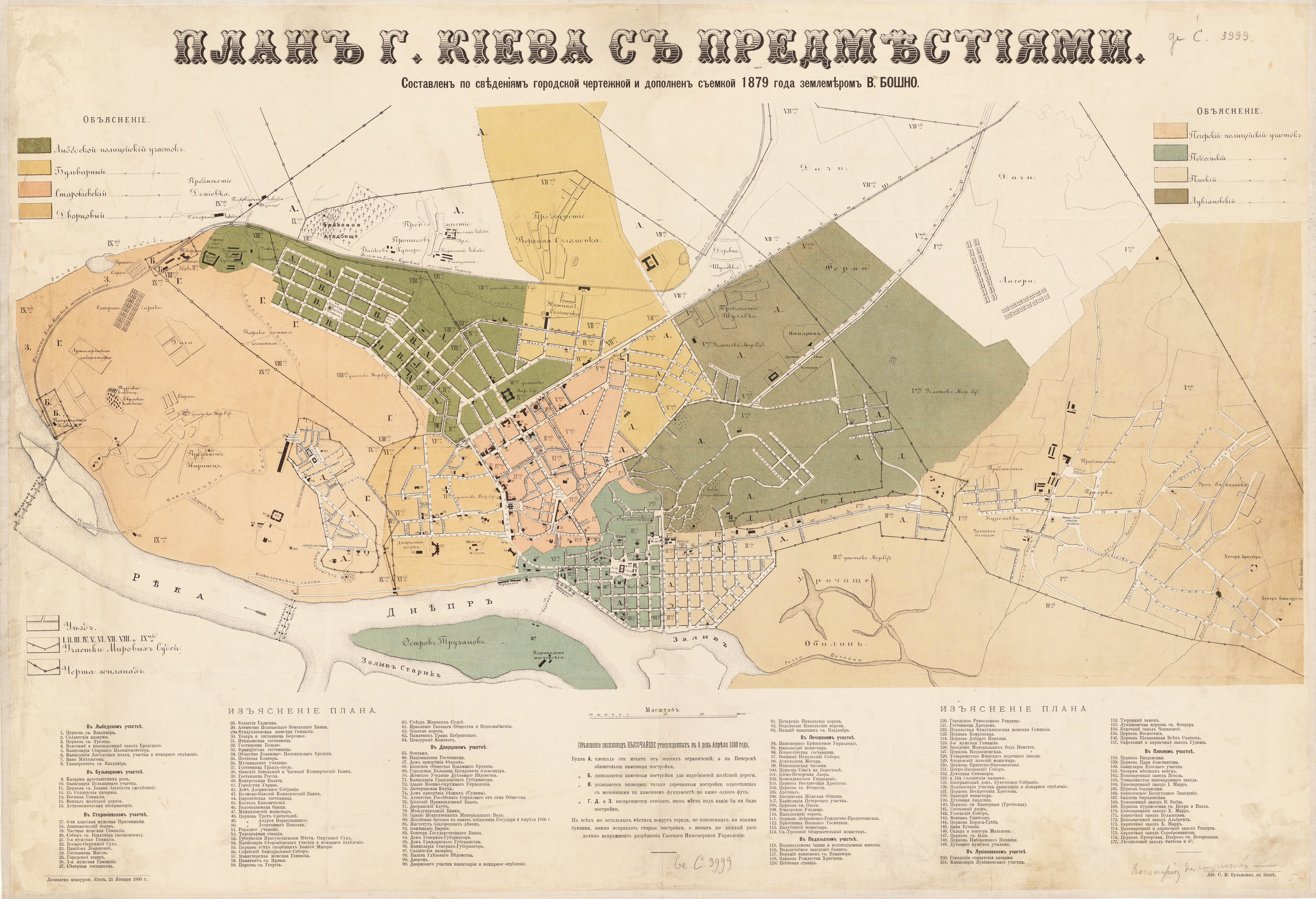
An 1879 map of Kyiv, showing the railway bridge and the Nicholas Bridge, then the only permanent structures across the Dnieper

The British engineer Charles Blacker Vignoles directed the bridge's construction, and Fox, Henderson and Company supplied the ironwork. In 1851 a silver model of the bridge was presented at The Great Exhibition in London. Building started in 1848 and was completed in 1853. The 776-metre-long (2,546 ft) bridge was the largest at that time in Europe.

In 1920, during the Polish-Soviet War, retreating Polish troops blew up the bridge. It was restored based on old drawings by Evgeny Paton, and opened again in 1925 as the Yevheniia Bosh Bridge, named after the Bolshevik Yevgenia Bosch. Paton significantly changed its structure and raised it by several metres, so that the Yevgenia Bosch Bridge may be considered as a new bridge.

On 19 September 1941, retreating Soviet troops demolished the Yevgenia Bosch Bridge. It was not restored after the war. In 1965 in place of the former chain bridge a new Kyiv Metro Bridge was built.

== See also ==
- Bridges in Kyiv

== Bibliography ==
- Rolt, LTC (1970). Victorian Engineering. London: Allen Lane. SBN 7139-0104-7.
