= Paton Bridge =

Paton Bridge Міст Патона
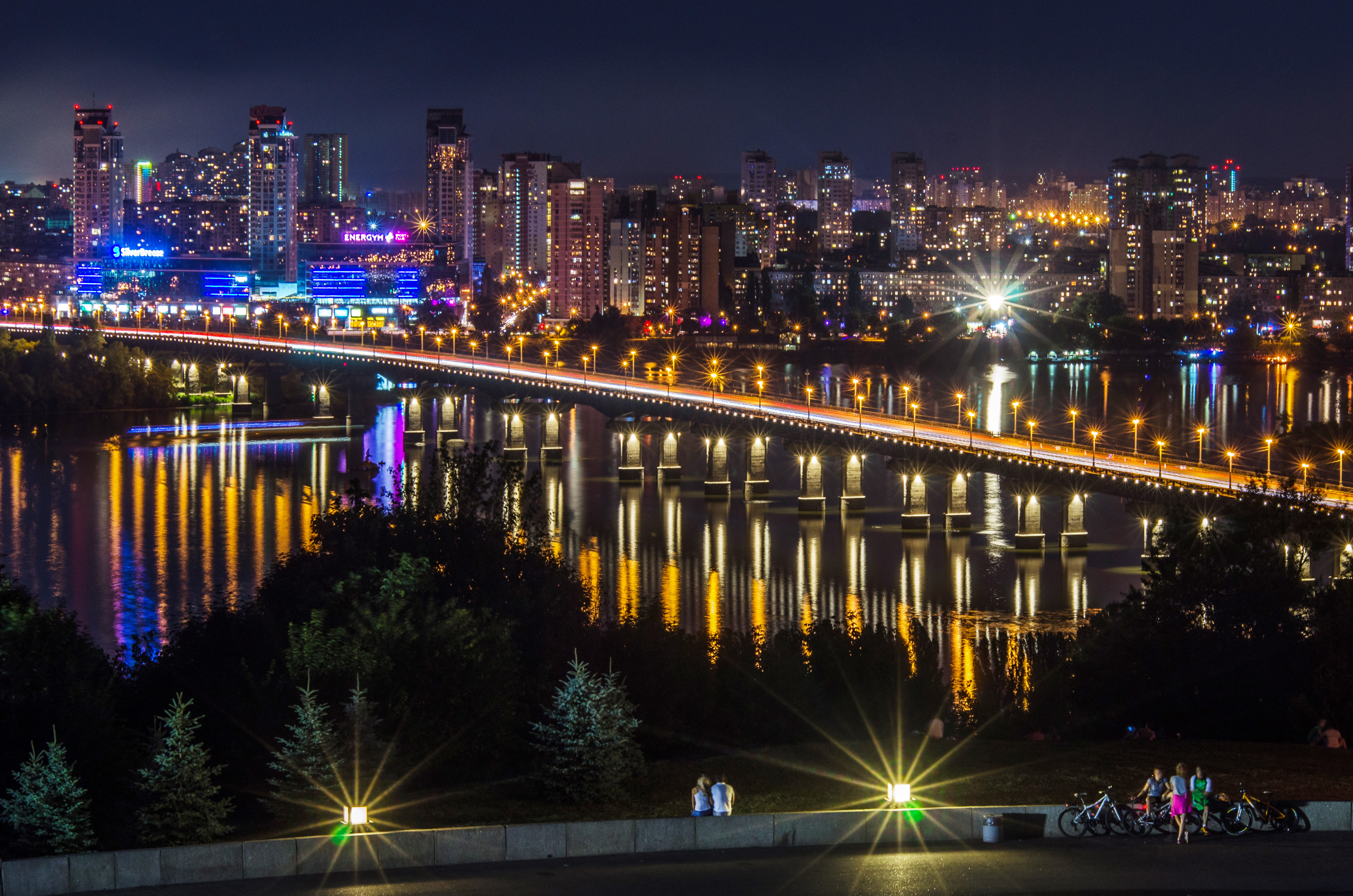
- Paton Bridge
- Coordinates: 50°25′38″N 30°34′55″E
- Carries: Automobiles; Trams (formerly)
- Crosses: Dnipro River
- Locale: Kyiv, Ukraine
- Official name: Paton Bridge
- Owner: Ukraine
- Maintained by: Kyivavtodor
- Heritage status: Architecture and Urban Planning Monument of Local Significance; Science and Technology Heritage of Local Significance
- Preceded by: Kyiv Metro Bridge
- Followed by: New Darnytskyi Bridge

Characteristics
- Material: Steel
- Total length: 1,543 metres (5,062 ft)
- Width: 21 metres (69 ft)
- No. of spans: 26
- Piers in water: 48
- Load limit: 70,000 vehicles per day
- Clearance below: 18 metres (59 ft)

History
- Designer: Evgeny Paton
- Constructed by: Mostobud
- Construction start: July 1941; 84 years ago
- Construction end: November 1953; 72 years ago
- Opened: November 5, 1953; 72 years ago
- Inaugurated: November 5, 1953; 72 years ago

Statistics
- Daily traffic: 36,000 vehicles per day

Immovable Monument of Local Significance of Ukraine
- Official name: Міст ім. Є.О. Патона (Bridge named after Y. O Paton)
- Type: Architecture, Urban Planning, Science and Technology
- Reference no.: 530-Кв

Location
- Interactive map of Paton Bridge

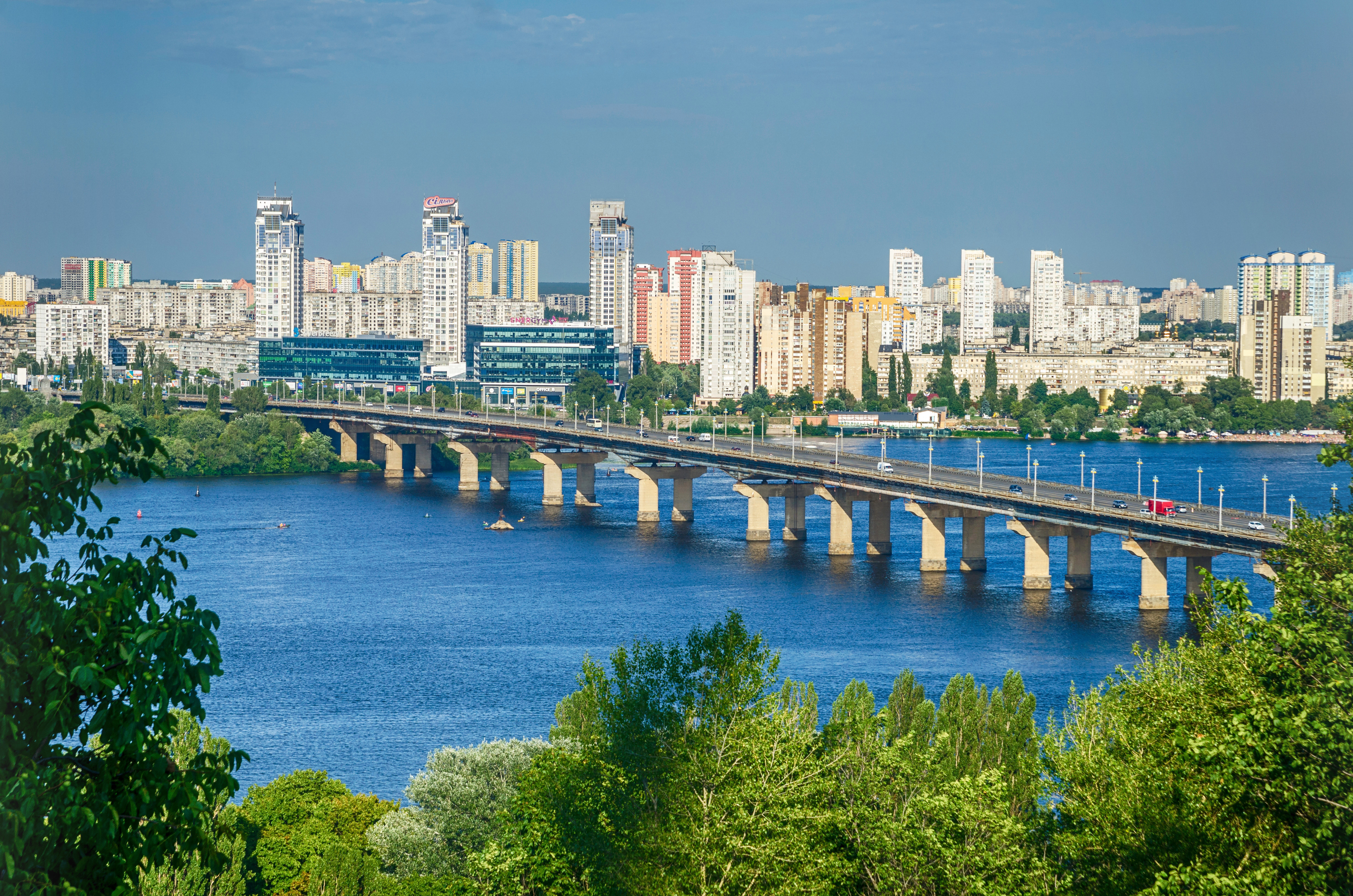
View of the Paton Bridge and the left-bank neighborhoods of the city.

Paton Bridge (Ukrainian: Міст Патона, romanized: Mist Patona) is one of the bridges across the Dnipro in Kyiv, Ukraine named after its constructor Evgeny Paton. Built between 1941 and 1953, it is one of the world's first all-welded bridges and the longest bridge in Kyiv, having a length of 1,543 metres (5,062 ft). Traffic across the bridge was opened on 5 November 1953. The bridge also acts as a segment of the Small Ring Road of Kyiv.

== Construction ==
Engineer Evgeny Paton played a direct role in the design and construction of the bridge. Originally he came up with a revolutionary, even on a global scale, innovative idea of all-welding the structure instead of using the traditional riveted design. The first such road bridge in the world, the Maurzyce Bridge, had been opened only in 1928 and since then the idea was a relative novelty in civil engineering, with only a couple dozen constructions finished before the outbreak of World War II. Paton urged the designers that such an approach will greatly improve the reliability of the structure, but initially, his idea did not find any support amongst the professionals. Eventually, his idea of all-welding did receive support, as he was given the go-ahead to start building the bridge by the head of the Ukrainian Communist Party, Nikita Khrushchev, who personally oversaw the entire operation. The construction of the first span began in early June 1941 but was interrupted by the Great Patriotic War. After the reconquering of Kyiv by the Red Army on 6 November 1943, construction of the bridge was forced to begin practically from scratch as the retreating German troops blew up all of the existing parts of the incomplete bridge. However, the construction of the bridge was completed just in time for the 10th anniversary of the liberation of Kyiv and was officially opened on 5 November 1953. Upon the completion, the bridge was composed of 264 identical blocks which are 29 metres (95 ft) in length each, held together by welded seams totalling 10,668 metres (35,000 ft). The total weight of the entire structure is estimated to be over 10,000 tonnes (9,800 long tons; 11,000 short tons). The installation of the streetcar tracks on the bridge also enabled the passengers to commute between the Left Bank and Right Banks of Kyiv by tram, taking pressure off the buses.

== History ==
Since the successful opening in 1953, the bridge did not see any major additions or changes until 1968. Sometime during that year, two guardrails were installed separating both pedestrian and automobile traffic. This particular approach was never before used in the entire Soviet Union at the time. In 1976, a strength test was conducted to see how much pressure the bridge can withstand. Originally, the bridge was designed to handle 10,000 vehicles per day. However, the results of the test revealed that the bridge can withstand an estimated 70,000 vehicles per day. In 1995, the bridge was recognized by the American Welding Society as the most unique all-welded structure. In 2004 the bridge has undergone a major overhaul. In its anticipation, on 9 June of that year, the streetcar traffic on the bridge ceased to exist as the streetcar tracks were removed in favor of adding additional lanes to help ease the jams that were crippling the bridge and its vicinity during the rush hours. The bridge was divided into seven lanes. Three lanes would be used for both directions, plus one reversible lane in the middle. The addition of the reversible lane has also led to an increase in traffic accidents, especially head-on collisions. Starting on 1 February 2008, based on the initiative of the Department of Traffic Services, the bridge was equipped with additional lighting. In the summer of 2009 and 2010, the bridge has undergone through some major repairs.

== Future Improvements ==
According to the experts, the bridge's current state does not reflect modern design requirements and is in need of a major overhaul including the spans, waterproofing, welded seams, lighting poles, guardrails and the foundation itself as well. The expansion to four lanes in each direction at an expense of the reversible lane will also increase the average daily traffic by almost 60%. In addition, the concept of using a concrete divider, similar to the Ontario Tall Wall, as used on the Northern Bridge since 2007, would greatly reduce traffic accidents, especially head-on collisions. As of November 2010, this next major overhaul is estimated to cost the city an estimated ₴714,000,000. The reconstruction is scheduled to begin in 2011 and is estimated to last up to 27 months.

== See also ==
- Bridges in Kyiv
