= Amand Struve =

Russian military engineer (1835–1898)

- Аманд Струве
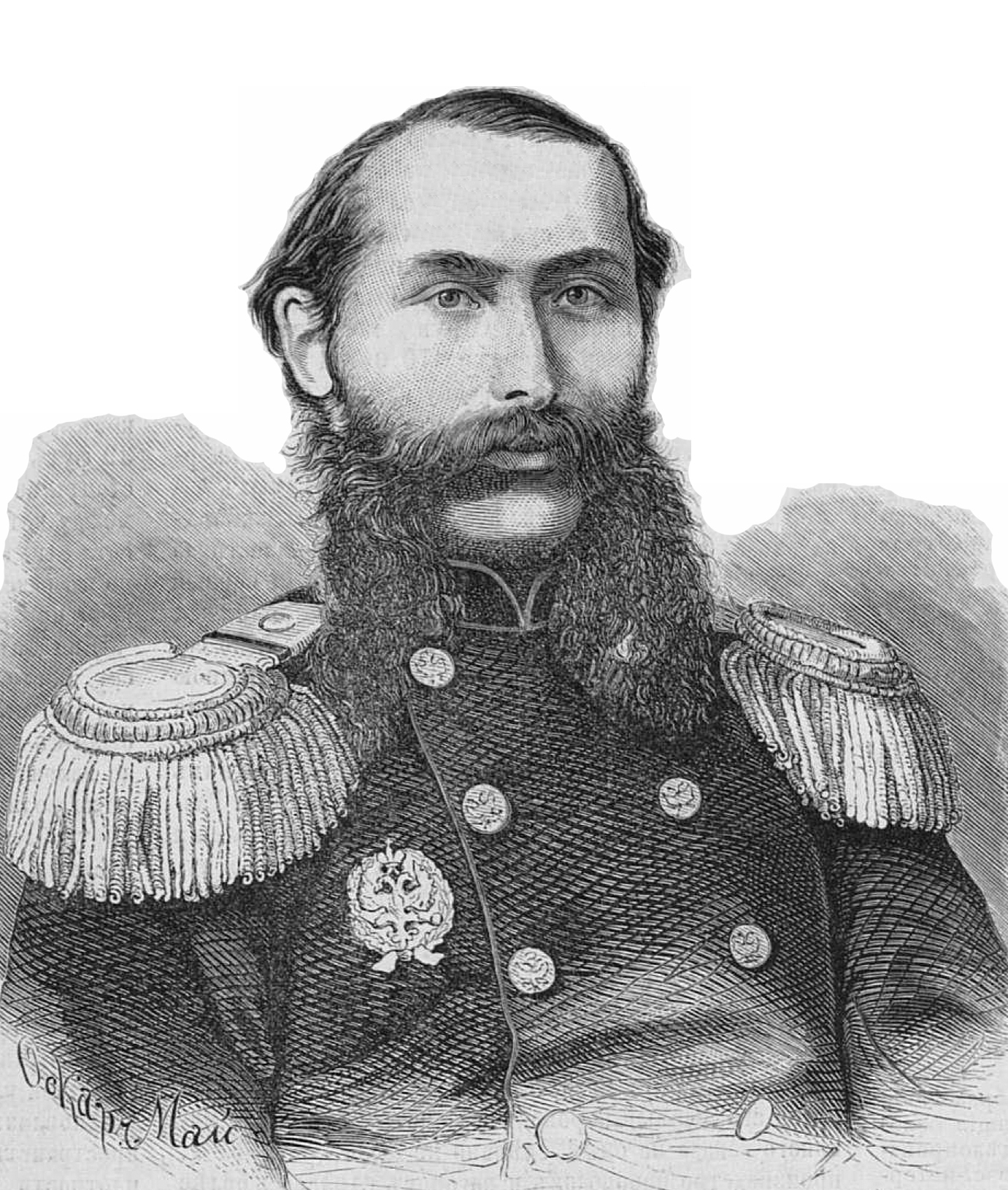
- Struve in 1870
- Born: May 30, 1835; Saint Petersburg, Russia
- Died: September 12, 1898 (aged 63); Saint Petersburg, Russia
- Occupation: Military engineer

Signature
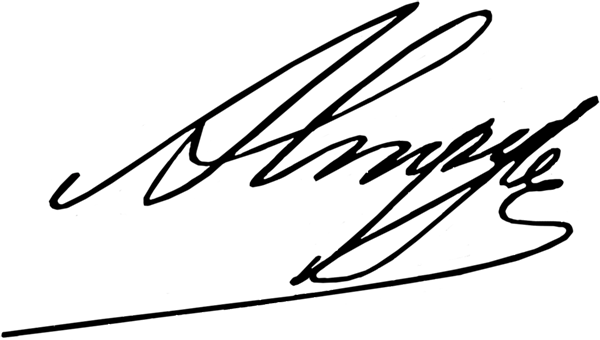

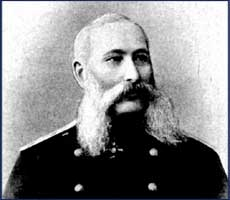
Portrait

Amand Yegorovich Struve (Russian: Аманд Егорович Струве; 30 May 1835 – 12 September [O.S. 31 August] 1898) was a Russian military engineer and bridge specialist of Baltic German descent.

Struve's relatives included diplomats, engineers, government officials and military officers. He was a graduate of the main artillery school of the Imperial Russian Army and received his engineering education at the Nikolaevsky Engineering Academy.

From 1858 to 1862, he was chief of construction of the Moscow–Nizhny Novgorod railway, which was opened from Moscow to Vladimir on 26 June [O.S. 14 June] 1861 and to Nizhny Novgorod on 13 August [O.S. 1 August] 1862.

In 1863, he established workshops at Kolomna to manufacture iron structures for bridge spans. This facility was converted in 1871 to manufacture machinery under the name A. Struve, Kolomna Maschinenfabrik, with his brother Gustav as manager. This was the forerunner of today's Kolomensky Zavod (German: Lokomotivfabrik Kolomna).

Struve was chief of construction in 1864–1865 of the Oka bridge of the Moscow–Ryazan railway, the first bridge in Russia intended for both railway and road traffic. He next supervised construction of a section of the Moscow–Kursk railway; this road was opened from Moscow to Kursk on 29 September [O.S. 17 September] 1868.

From 1868 to 1870, Struve was the chief of construction of the Struve Bridge on the Dnieper at Kiev. This was the first Russian bridge in which the foundation was laid using the caisson method. His subsequent bridge projects included the Dnieper bridge at Kremenchug (1870–1872), the Liteyny Bridge on the Neva at St. Petersburg (1875–1879), and the Alexandrovsky Bridge on the Volga at Syzran (1876–1880).

Upon completion of the Liteyny Bridge in 1879, Struve was promoted to major general. When his brother Gustav died in 1882 he assumed management of the works at Kolomna. In Kiev, Struve built a central sewerage system, horse-pulled railway (1885–1886), the first electric tramway in the Russian Empire (1891–1892), and a gas-powered street lighting system.

Promoted to lieutenant general in 1896, Struve died in Kolomna two years later.
