= Evgeny Paton =

Ukrainian and Soviet scientist and engineer

- Євген Патон
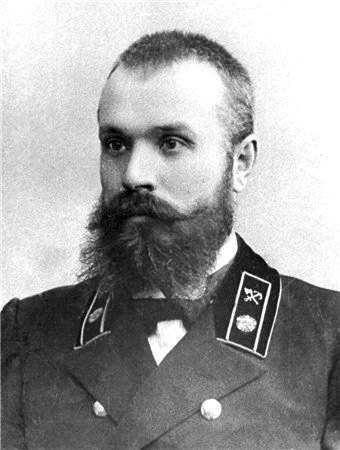
- Paton in the 1910s
- Born: 5 March 1870; Nice, France
- Died: 12 August 1953 (aged 83); Kyiv, Ukrainian SSR, Soviet Union
- Education: Dresden Technical University (1894); Institute of Engineer Corp of Transportation (1896)
- Known for: Vice-President of the Academy of Sciences of the Ukrainian SSR (1945–52)
- Spouse: Natalie Viktorovna Budde
- Children: Volodymyr, Borys
- Awards: Distinguished Scientist and Technician or Artist of Ukrainian SSR (1940); Order of the Red Banner of Labour (1940); Stalin Prize (1941); Order of the Red Star (1942); Order of Lenin (1942, 1943); Hero of Socialist Labour (1943); Order of the Patriotic War (1945)
- Scientific career
- Fields: Welding
- Workplaces: E. O. Paton Electric Welding Institute, International Association of Science Academies, National Academy of Sciences of Ukraine
- Notable students: Borys Medovar; Borys Paton; Volodymyr Pidhaietskyi; Heorhii Raievskyi; Viacheslav Shevernytskyi; Pyotr Kamentsev

Signature
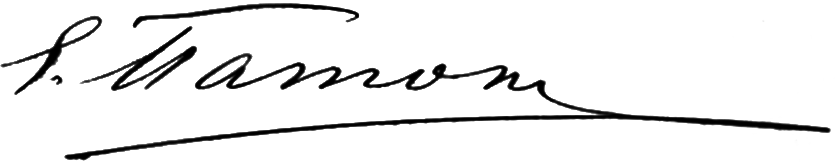

Professor Yevhen Oskarovych Paton (Ukrainian: Євген Оскарович Патон; 5 March 1870 – 12 August 1953), also known as Evgeny Oskarovich Paton (Note: Also transliterated as Yevgeny) (Russian: Евгений Оскарович Патон), was a Russian Empire and Soviet Union engineer who established in 1934 the E. O. Paton Electric Welding Institute in Kyiv. Paton was a people's deputy of the Supreme Soviet of the Soviet Union (1946–1953). He was the father of Borys Paton.

== Early career ==
Born in 1870 in Nice, France, he studied at the Dresden Technical University (graduated in 1894), and at the Petersburg Institute of Railway Roads (graduated in 1896). He designed the structure of the train station in Dresden and was a lecturer at the Moscow Engineering College of Railway Roads (1889–1904). Paton was a professor at Kyiv Polytechnic Institute and the Chairman of the Bridge Department from 1904 to 1938. In 1929 he organized a welding laboratory and the Electric Welding Committee. In 1934 Paton founded the Electric Welding Institute of the Academy of Sciences of the Ukrainian SSR in Kyiv. His idea of all-welding received support by the then-head of the Ukrainian Communist Party, Nikita Khrushchev. From 1945 to 1952 he was a Vice-President of the Academy of Sciences of the Ukrainian SSR.

== Welding research ==
Paton was a pioneer researcher of joining and welding technology. To make welding a reliable technological process, it was necessary to conduct comprehensive research regarding the mechanics of welded structures, the metallurgical processes involved, and the physics of the arc, as well as to develop welding equipment, tools, and techniques.

Paton created methods used in the design of rational bridge spans, investigated the conditions of their operation, and suggested methods for restoring damaged bridges. He researched the fundamentals of welding, how to calculate the strength of welded structures and the mechanization of welding processes. He supervised the development of automatic submerged arc welding. During World War II Paton supervised the design and production of equipment and technology for automated welding of special steels for tanks, bombs, and other military hardware.

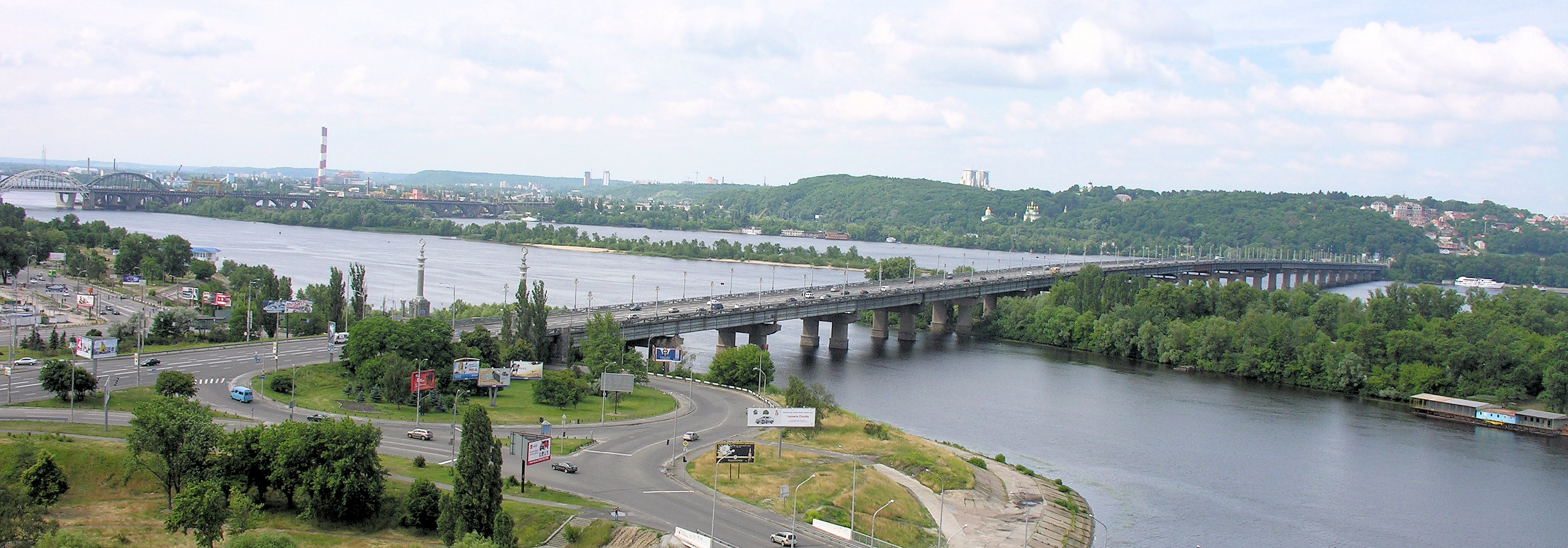
Paton Bridge, a fully welded steel construction in Kyiv in 1953 developed by Evgeny Paton.

Paton supervised the wide implementation of welding in industry, including the design and production of assembly-line welding systems. He designed welded bridges and founded a domestic school of metal welding. Paton was awarded almost all of the highest Soviet government and scientific awards and prizes and received the title of the Hero of Socialist Labour.
