= New Darnytskyi Bridge =

Darnytskyi Automobile and Railway Bridge Crossing Дарницький автомобільно-залізничний мостсвий перехід
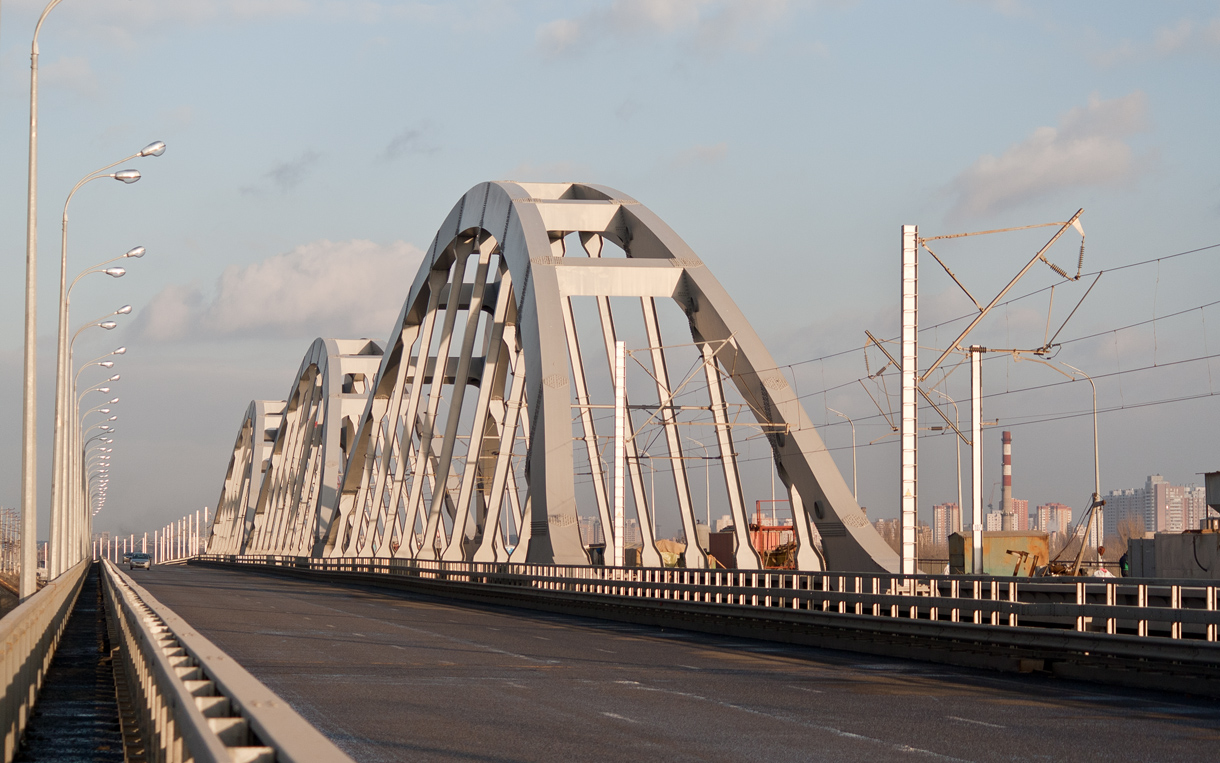
- New Darnytskyi Bridge pictured from its road deck looking eastwards.
- Coordinates: 50°24′58″N 30°35′11″E
- Carries: Road traffic, railway
- Crosses: Dnieper River
- Locale: Kyiv, Ukraine
- Other name(s): New Darnytskyi Bridge; Kirpa Bridge
- Owner: Ukraine
- Maintained by: Ukrzaliznytsia
- Preceded by: Darnytskyi Railroad Bridge

Characteristics
- Design: cantilever
- Material: Concrete, steel
- Total length: 1,100 metres (3,600 ft)

History
- Designer: Kyivdniprotrans
- Engineering design by: Oleg Zavarzin; Leonid Etnis
- Constructed by: Planeta-Mist
- Construction start: 2004
- Construction end: July 2023
- Opened: 2011
- Inaugurated: 2010

Location
- Interactive map of Darnytskyi Automobile and Railway Bridge Crossing

The Darnytskyi Automobile and Railway Bridge Crossing (Ukrainian: Дарницький автомобільно-залізничний мостсвий перехід, romanized: Darnytskyi avtomobilno-zaliznychnyi mostovyi perekhid), known colloquially as the New Darnytskyi Bridge (Ukrainian: Новий Дарницький міст, romanized: Novyi Darnytskyi mist) or Kirpa Bridge (Ukrainian: Міст Кірпи, romanized: Mist Kirpy), is a combined road and railroad bridge in Kyiv, the capital of Ukraine. It spans across the Dnieper River connecting the left and right banks of the city, the Darnytsia and Holosiiv districts of Kyiv, respectively. The bridge carries a double track rail line and is built to accommodate six lanes of road traffic.

The bridge was completed in July 2023, but operated in reduced capacity for months before, lacking road connection ramps from some directions. Additional railroad links to match the new bridges' capacity are also being constructed. The bridge's expected capacity is 60,000 vehicles and 120 pairs of trains per day, which will serve as a major relief for both the Kyiv road and bridge network and as well as Ukraine's Ukrzaliznytsia national rail system.

== Location and design ==
The new bridge was built 50 m (164 ft) north of the existing Darnytskyi Railroad Bridge.

== History ==
The bridge construction is the initiative of the late Heorhiy Kirpa, the head of Ukrzaliznytsia and the Minister of Transportation in the early 2000s (hence the unofficial name).

The 1,100 m (3,609 ft)-span will cost an estimated $700 million. Its construction was ordered by the state-owned Ukrzaliznytsia rail company and financed by the government, but the Kyiv municipality co-sponsors the project. The main developer of the project is Kyivdniprotrans, and the main constructor is BMK Planeta-Mist. Following the construction of the bridge, a new major passenger terminal will be completed in the Darnytsia Railway Station on the left bank of the city.

In July 2006 one third of the bridge was constructed and the first train was initially expected to run through the bridge in the second half of 2007. However, in spring of 2007, cracks were discovered in the bridge's structure, delaying its construction. The bridge opening was then scheduled for March 2008. On May 7, 2010 the bridge was tested with first electrified train traffic. On September 27, 2010 the railroad segment of the bridge was officially opened; on March 31, 2011, road traffic opened. The bridge was scheduled for completion in 2012.

In 2011, the Ukrainian government spent a total of ₴1.5 billion for the project.

== See also ==
- Vydubychi
- Bridges in Kyiv
