= Industrialna (Kyiv Light Rail) =

Kyiv Light Rail station

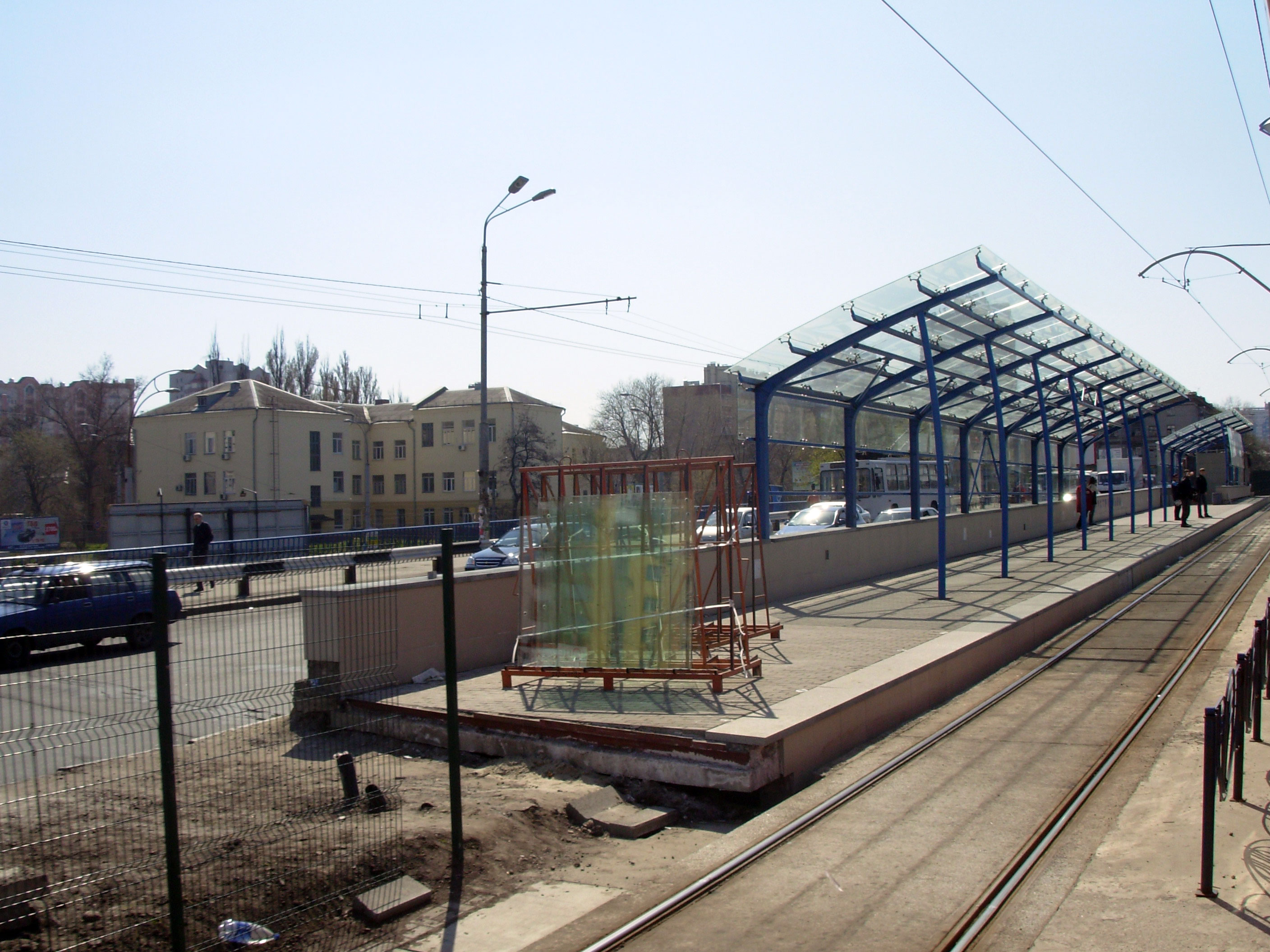

General information
- Coordinates: 50°26′38″N 30°26′32″E
- Owner: Kyivpastrans
- Line: Pravoberezhna line

History
- Opened: 1977

Services
Preceding station	Kyiv Light Rail	Following station
National Aviation University towards Mykhailivska Borshchavihka	Line 1	Oleksy Tykhoho towards Starovokzalna
National Aviation University towards Kiltseva Doroha	Line 3	Oleksy Tykhoho towards Starovokzalna
Location

Industrialna (Ukrainian: Індустріальна) is a station on the Kyiv Light Rail in Ukraine. It was opened in 1977.

== History ==
On October 12 2008 section Politekhnichna - Ivana Lepse was closed for reconstruction.

On October 16, 2010, the station was opened for several hours, but then closed again due to unpreparedness of the underpass. Reopened to passengers on October 24, 2010. After opening, repair works continued at the station, and by December 2010, cover was installed over the platforms and entrances to the underpasses.
