= Hnata Yury (Kyiv Light Rail) =

Kyiv Light Rail station

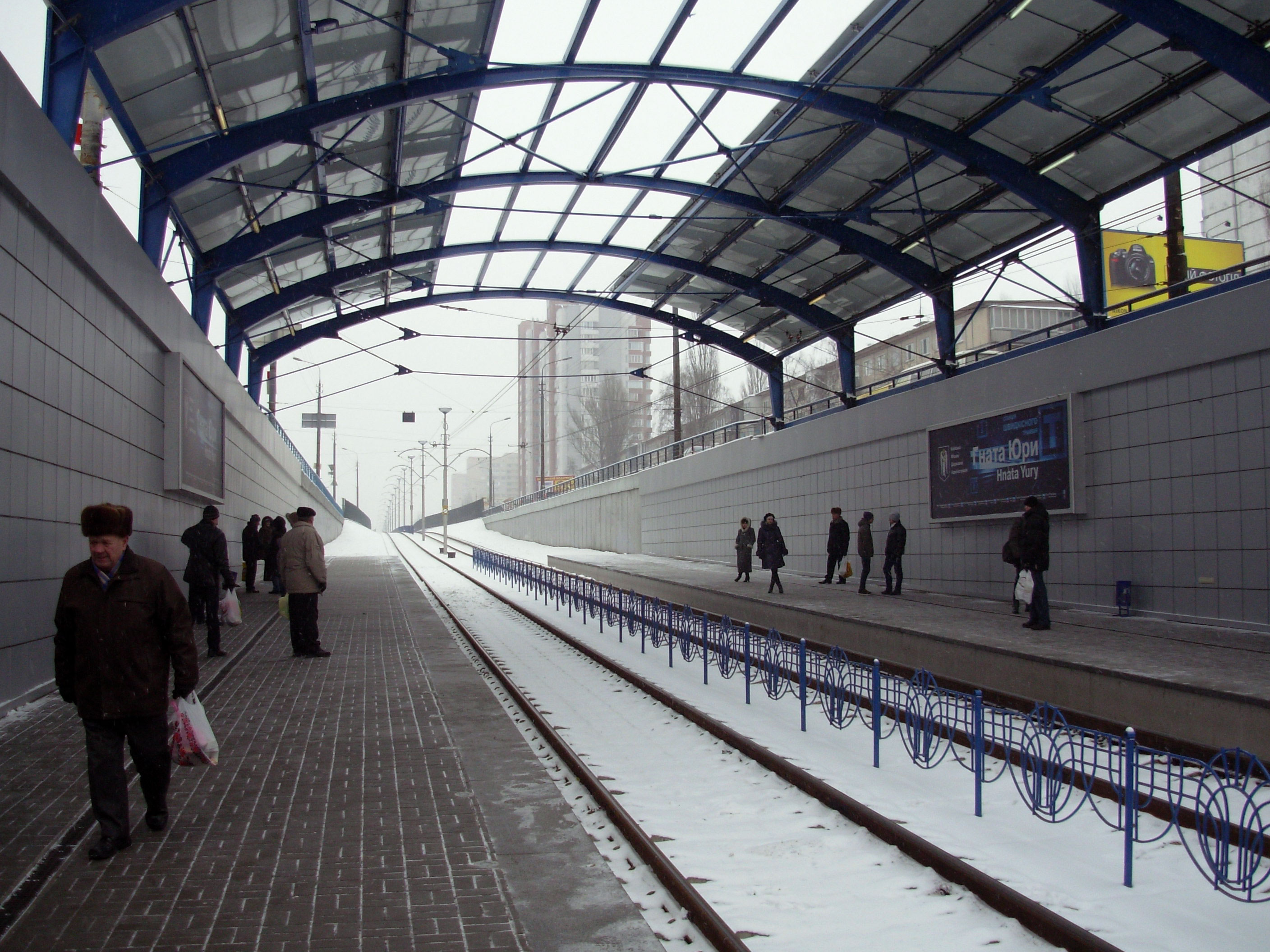

General information
- Coordinates: 50°25′47″N 30°23′12″E
- Owner: Kyivpastrans
- Line: Pravoberezhna line

History
- Opened: 1977

Services
| Preceding station | Kyiv Light Rail | Following station |
|---|---|---|
| Vasylia Domanytskoho Street towards Mykhailivska Borshchavihka | Line 1 | Ivana Dziuby towards Starovokzalna |
| Zhulia Verna towards Kiltseva Doroha | Line 3 | Ivana Dziuby towards Starovokzalna |
Location

Hnata Yury (Ukrainian: Гната Юри) is a station on the Kyiv Light Rail. It was opened in 1977.

The station is under the roundabout at Lesya Kurbas, Gnata Yuri, and Volodymyr Pokotyl Street, but is not a full-fledged underground station because it is not fully covered. The station has two shore platforms with separate exits connected by a pedestrian bridge.

== History ==
Closed for reconstruction as part of the route "Ivan Lepse"- "Hnata Yury" on June 13, 2009. During the reconstruction, an arched ceiling was built over the platforms and tracks and the entrance pavilions were renovated, as well as a track connecting the branches from Gnata Yuri to the Kiltseva Doroga station and to Mykhailivska Borshchahivka. On October 16, 2010, the station of high-speed trams was opened after reconstruction, trams of routes № 1 and № 3 stop here.

== Gallery ==
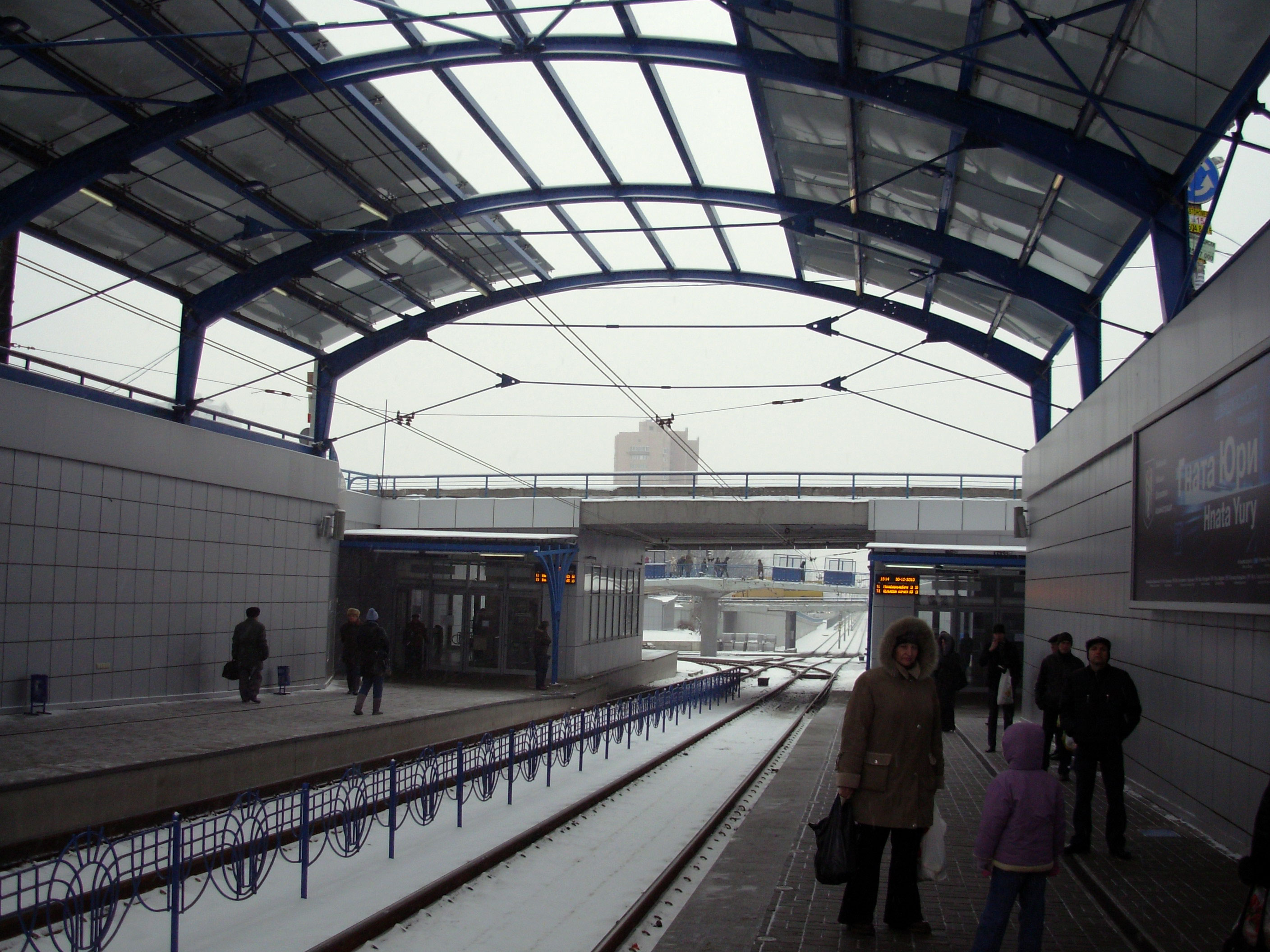
Landing platforms

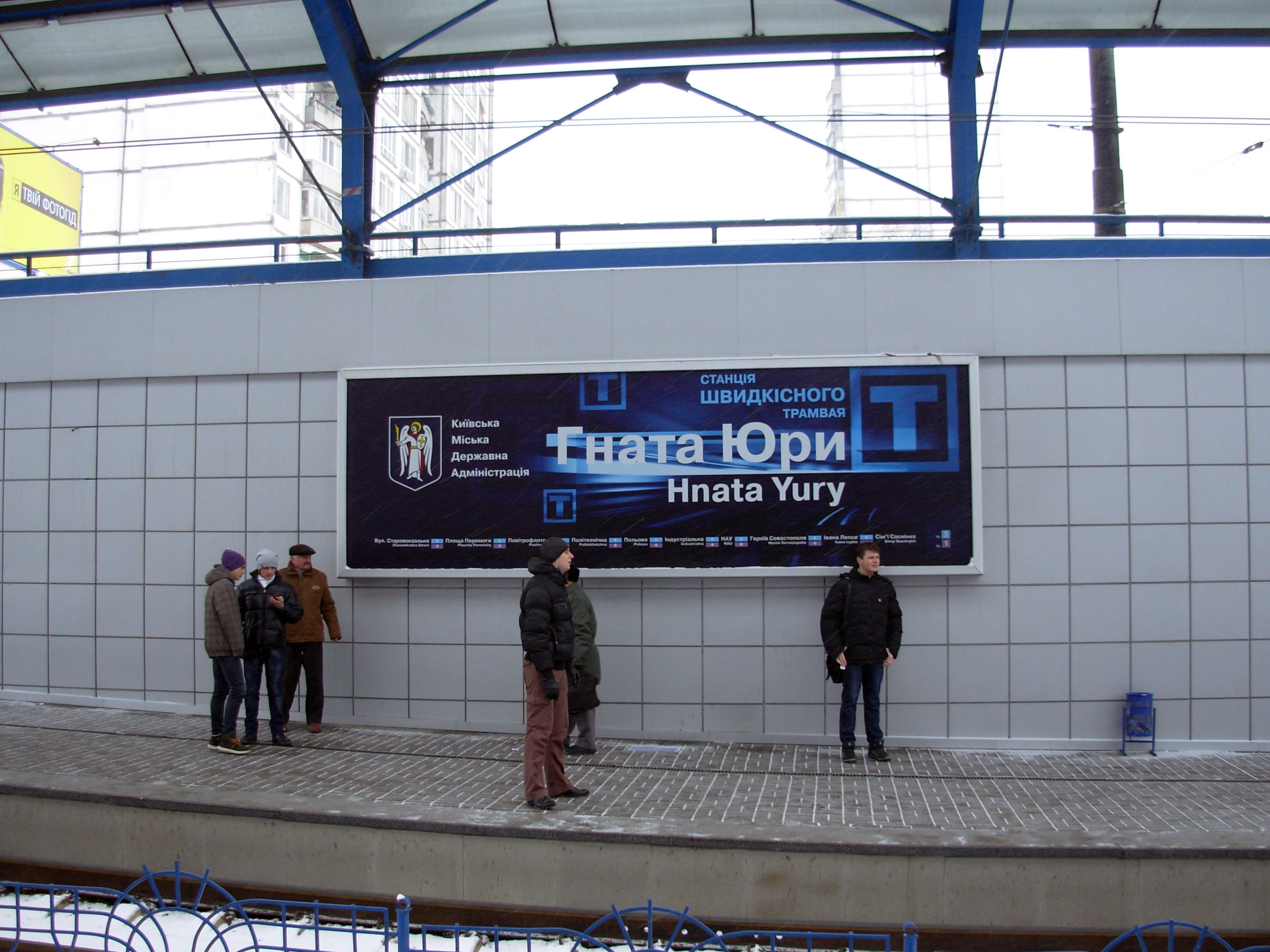
Nameplate of the station on the platform

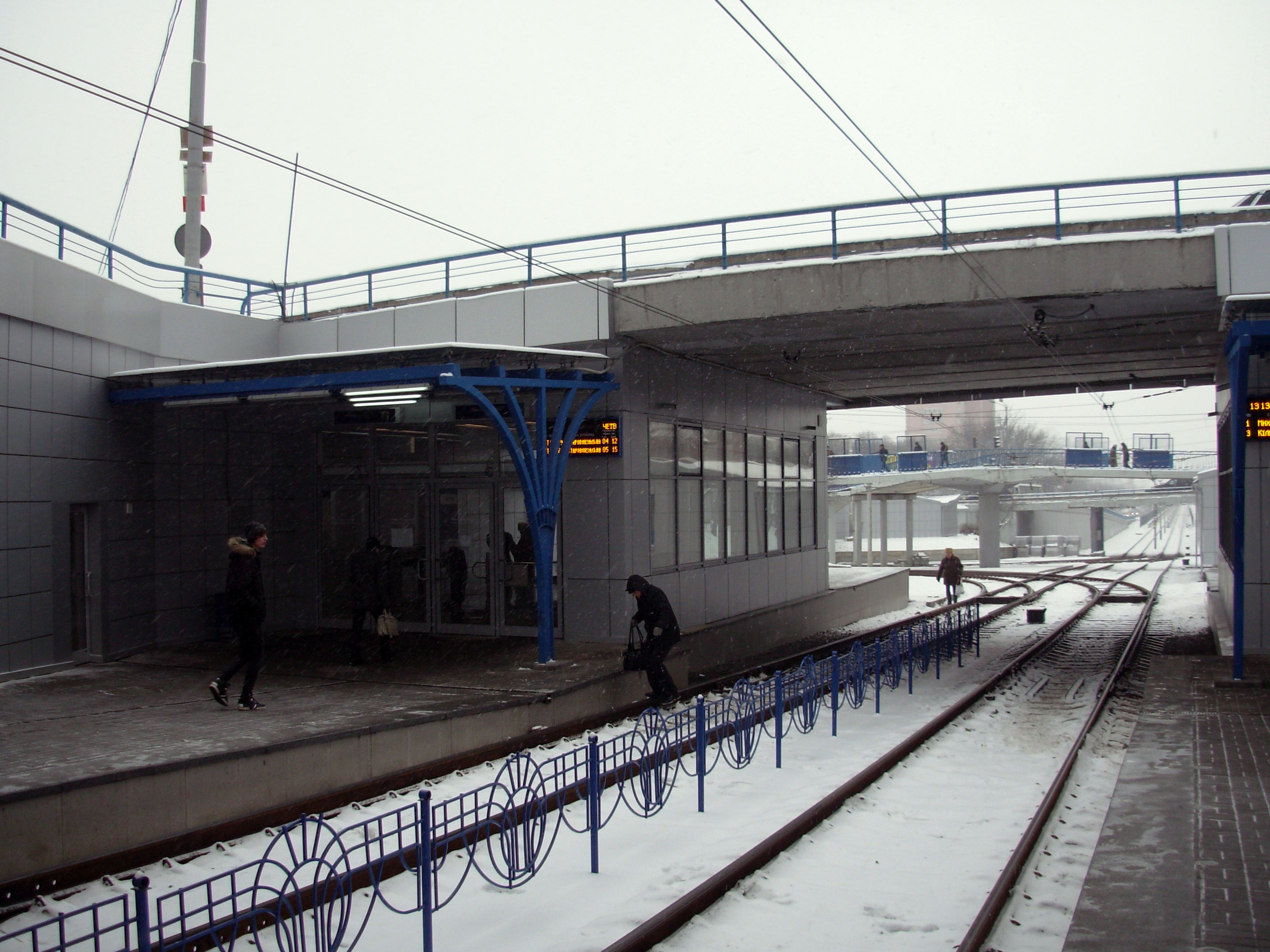
Exit to the city

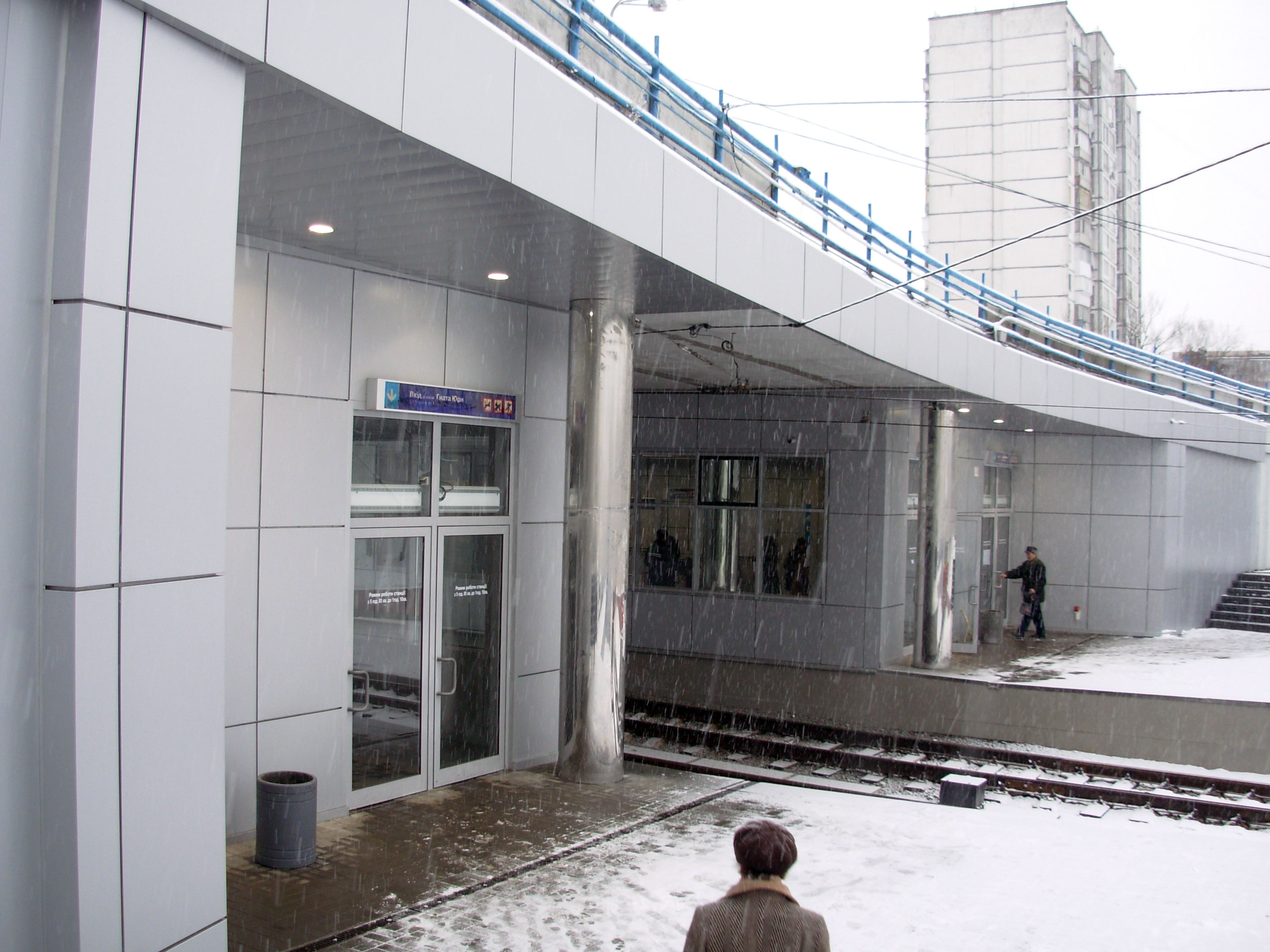
Entrance to the station

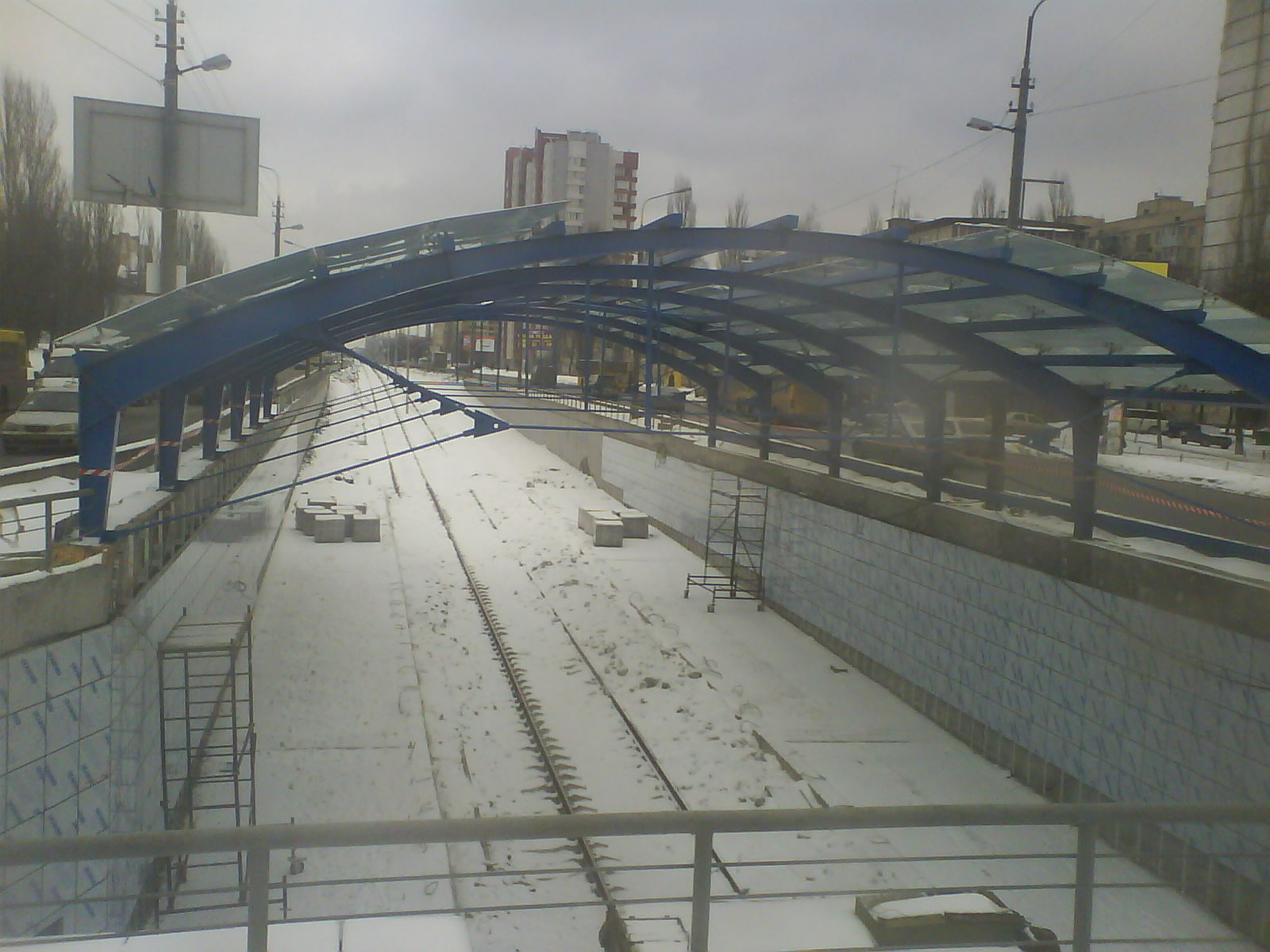
Reconstruction of the station, March 2010
