= Oleksy Tykhoho (Kyiv Light Rail) =

Kyiv Light Rail station

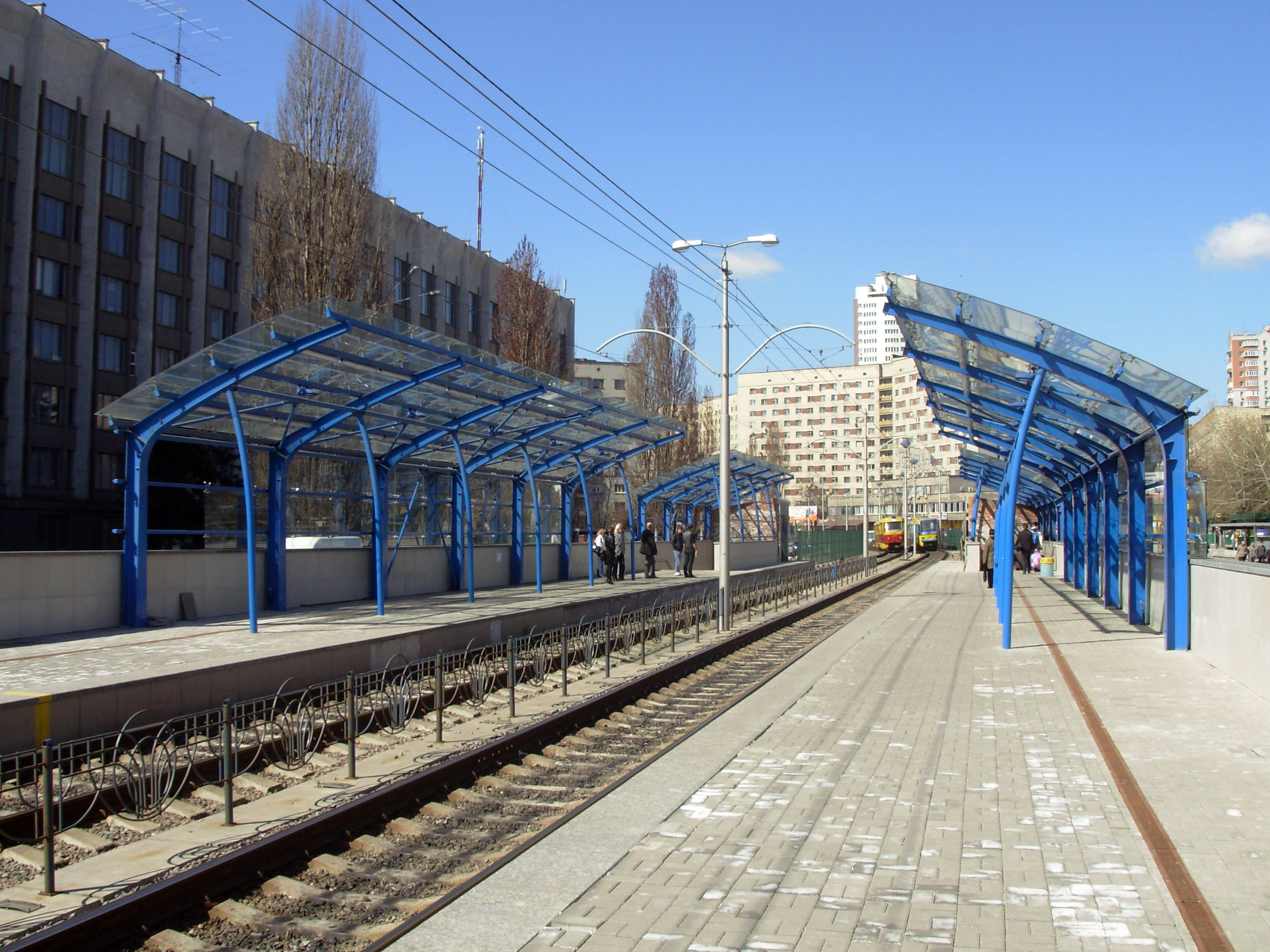

General information
- Coordinates: 50°26′47″N 30°27′18″E
- Owner: Kyivpastrans
- Line: Pravoberezhna line

History
- Opened: 1977

Services
Preceding station	Kyiv Light Rail	Following station
Industrialna towards Mykhailivska Borshchavihka	Line 1	Politekhnichna towards Starovokzalna
Industrialna towards Kiltseva Doroha	Line 3	Politekhnichna towards Starovokzalna
Location

Oleksy Tykhoho (Ukrainian: Олекси Тихого; until 2020, Poliova) is a station on the Kyiv Light Rail. It was opened in 1977.
