= Ivana Dziuby (Kyiv Light Rail) =

Kyiv Light Rail station

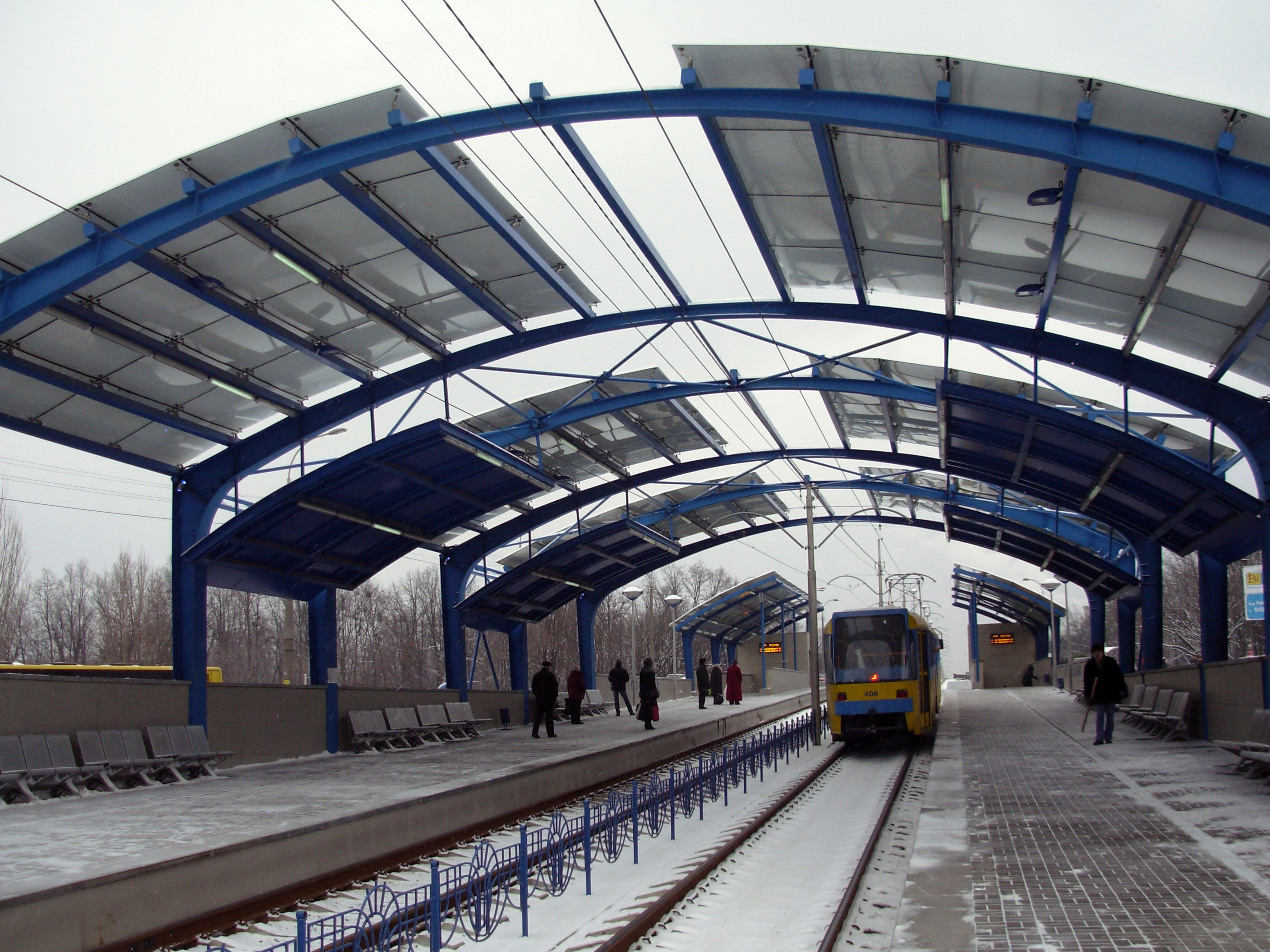

General information
- Coordinates: 50°25′59″N 30°23′59″E
- Owner: Kyivpastrans
- Line: Pravoberezhna line

History
- Opened: 1977

Services
Preceding station	Kyiv Light Rail	Following station
Hnata Yury towards Mykhailivska Borshchavihka	Line 1	Vatslava Havela towards Starovokzalna
Hnata Yury towards Kiltseva Doroha	Line 3	Vatslava Havela towards Starovokzalna
Location

Ivana Dziuby (Ukrainian: Івана Дзюби; until 2023, Simi Sosninykh) is a station on the Kyiv Light Rail. It was opened in 1977.
