= Akademika Shalimova (Kyiv Light Rail) =

Kyiv Light Rail station

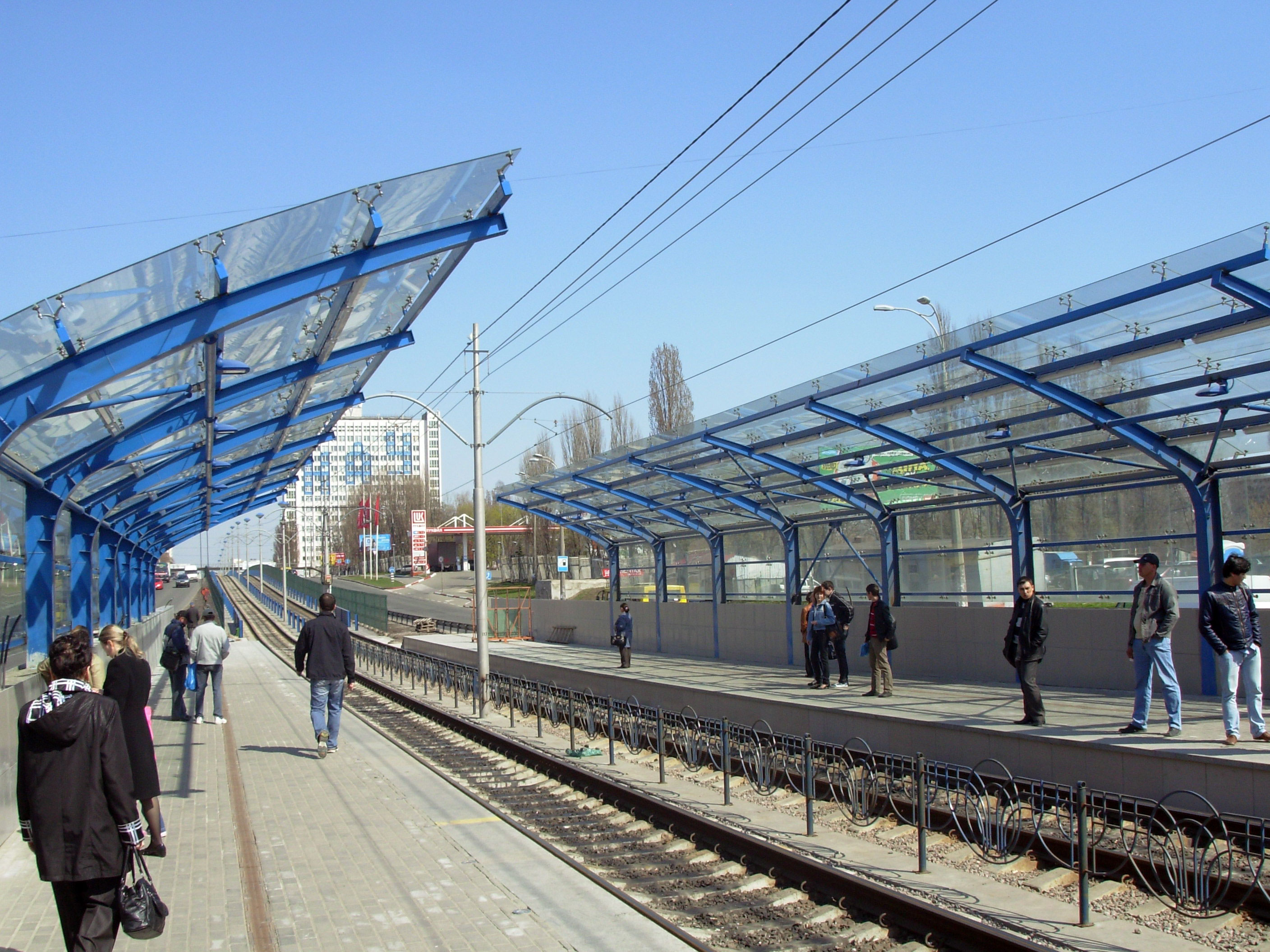

General information
- Coordinates: 50°26′17″N 30°25′11″E
- Owner: Kyivpastrans
- Line: Pravoberezhna line

History
- Opened: 1977

Services
Preceding station	Kyiv Light Rail	Following station
Vatslava Havela towards Mykhailivska Borshchavihka	Line 1	National Aviation University towards Starovokzalna
Vatslava Havela towards Kiltseva Doroha	Line 3	National Aviation University towards Starovokzalna
Location

Akademika Shalimova (Ukrainian: Академіка Шалімова, until 2024, Heroiv Sevastopolia) is a station on the Kyiv Light Rail. It was opened in 1977.
