= National Aviation University (Kyiv Light Rail) =

Kyiv Light Rail station

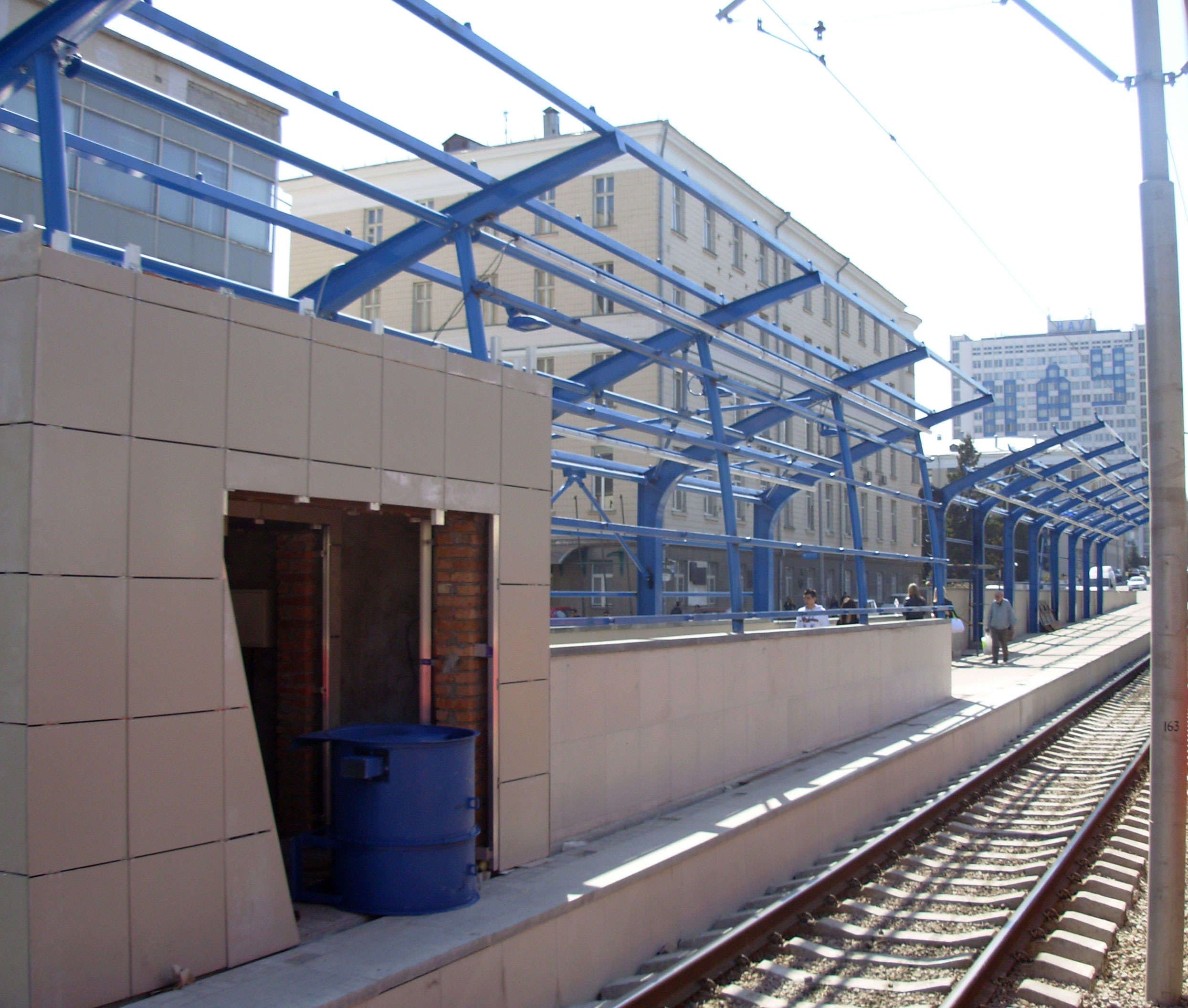

General information
- Coordinates: 50°26′28″N 30°25′51″E
- Owner: Kyivpastrans
- Line: Pravoberezhna line

History
- Opened: 1977

Services
Preceding station	Kyiv Light Rail	Following station
Akademika Shalimova towards Mykhailivska Borshchavihka	Line 1	Industrialna towards Starovokzalna
Akademika Shalimova towards Kiltseva Doroha	Line 3	Industrialna towards Starovokzalna
Location

National Aviation University (Ukrainian: Національний авіаційний університет) is a station on the Kyiv Light Rail. It was opened in 1977, beside the National Aviation University, and upgraded in 2010.
