= Zhulia Verna (Kyiv Light Rail) =

Kyiv Light Rail station

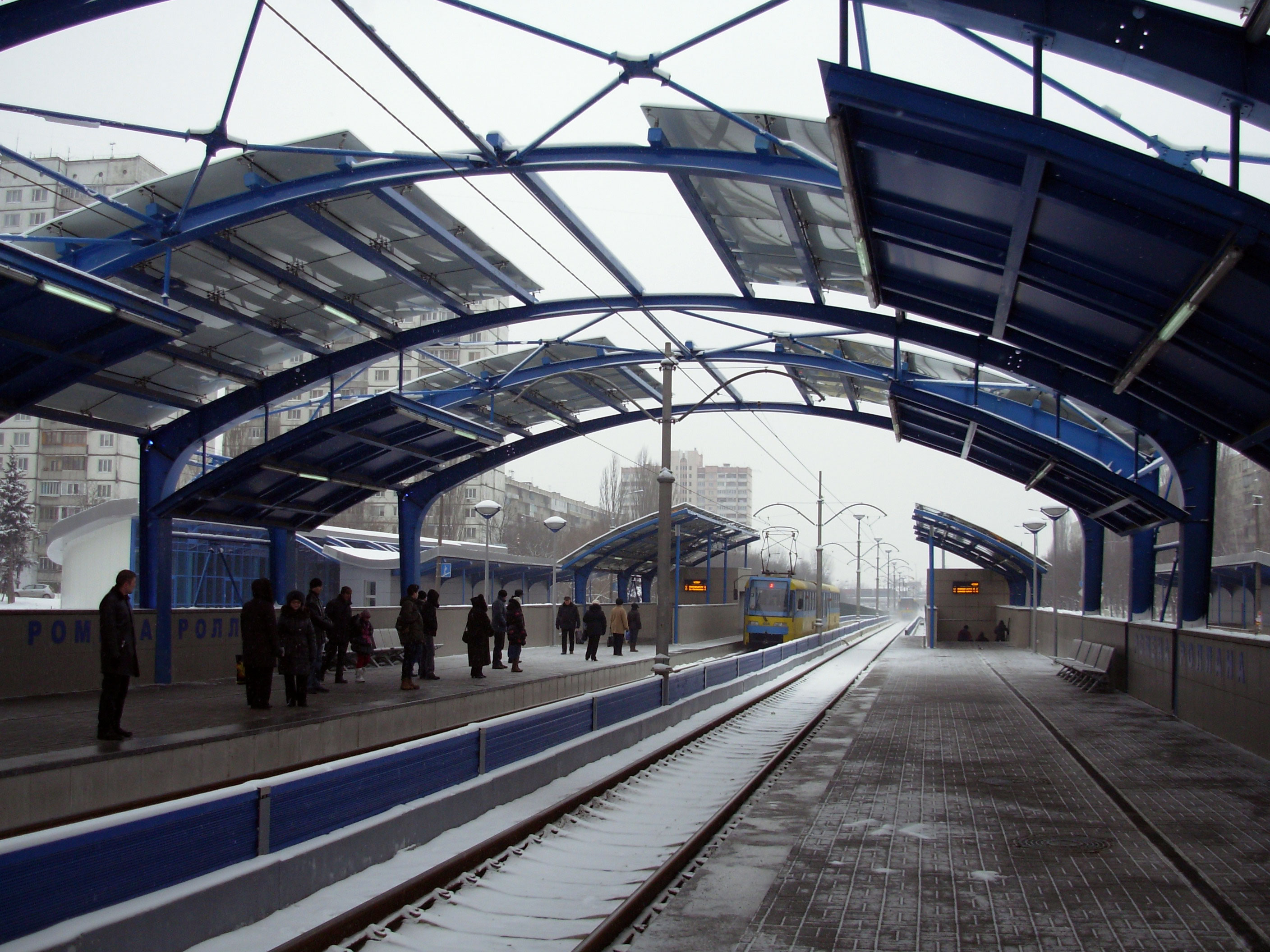

General information
- Coordinates: 50°25′36″N 30°22′28″E
- Owner: Kyivpastrans
- Line: Pravoberezhna line

History
- Opened: 1977

Services
| Preceding station | Kyiv Light Rail | Following station |
|---|---|---|
| Vasylia Domanytskoho Street towards Prospekt Akademika Koroliova | Line 2 | Kiltseva Doroha Terminus |
| Kiltseva Doroha Terminus | Line 3 | Hnata Yury towards Starovokzalna |
Location

Zhulia Verna (Ukrainian: Жуля Верна; until 2023, Romena Rollana) is a station on the Kyiv Light Rail. It was opened in 1977.

From September 30, 2019, Romena Rollana serves as the final stop of tram routes No 2 and No 3 during the reconstruction of Kiltseva Doroha.
