= Ploshcha Halytska (Kyiv Light Rail) =

Kyiv Light Rail station

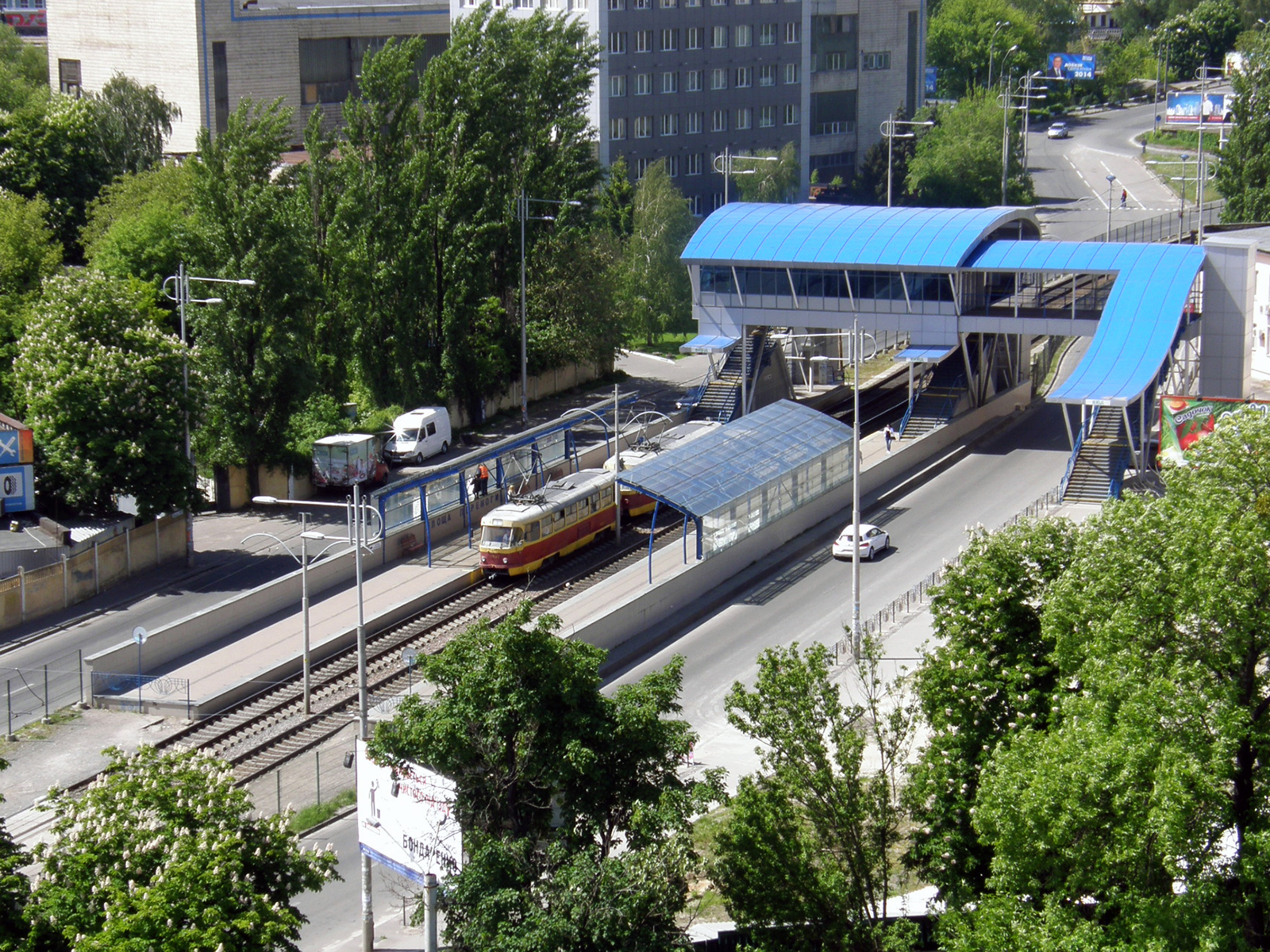
- Ploshcha Halytska (Kyiv Light Rail)

General information
- Coordinates: 50°26′46.5″N 30°29′18″E
- Owner: Kyivpastrans
- Line: Pravoberezhna line

History
- Opened: 1978
- Rebuilt: 2010

Services
Preceding station	Kyiv Light Rail	Following station
Politekhnichna towards Mykhailivska Borshchavihka	Line 1	Starovokzalna Terminus
Politekhnichna towards Kiltseva Doroha	Line 3	Starovokzalna Terminus
Location

Ploshcha Halytska (Ukrainian: Площа Галицька; until 2023, Ploshcha Peremohy) is a station on the Kyiv Light Rail. Originally opened in 1978, during the reconstruction of the tramways in 2010 the station was moved to the middle Zhylianska Street and the previous track loops were removed.
