= Politekhnichna (Kyiv Light Rail) =

Kyiv Light Rail station

General information
- Coordinates: 50°26′47″N 30°28′1″E
- Owner: Kyivpastrans
- Line: Pravoberezhna line

History
- Opened: 1978

Services
| Preceding station | Kyiv Light Rail | Following station |
|---|---|---|
| Oleksy Tykhoho towards Mykhailivska Borshchavihka | Line 1 | Ploshcha Halytska towards Starovokzalna |
| Oleksy Tykhoho towards Kiltseva Doroha | Line 3 | Ploshcha Halytska towards Starovokzalna |
Location

Politekhnichna (Ukrainian: Політехнічна) is a station on the Kyiv Light Rail. It was opened in 1978.
