= Vatslava Havela (Kyiv Light Rail) =

Kyiv Light Rail station

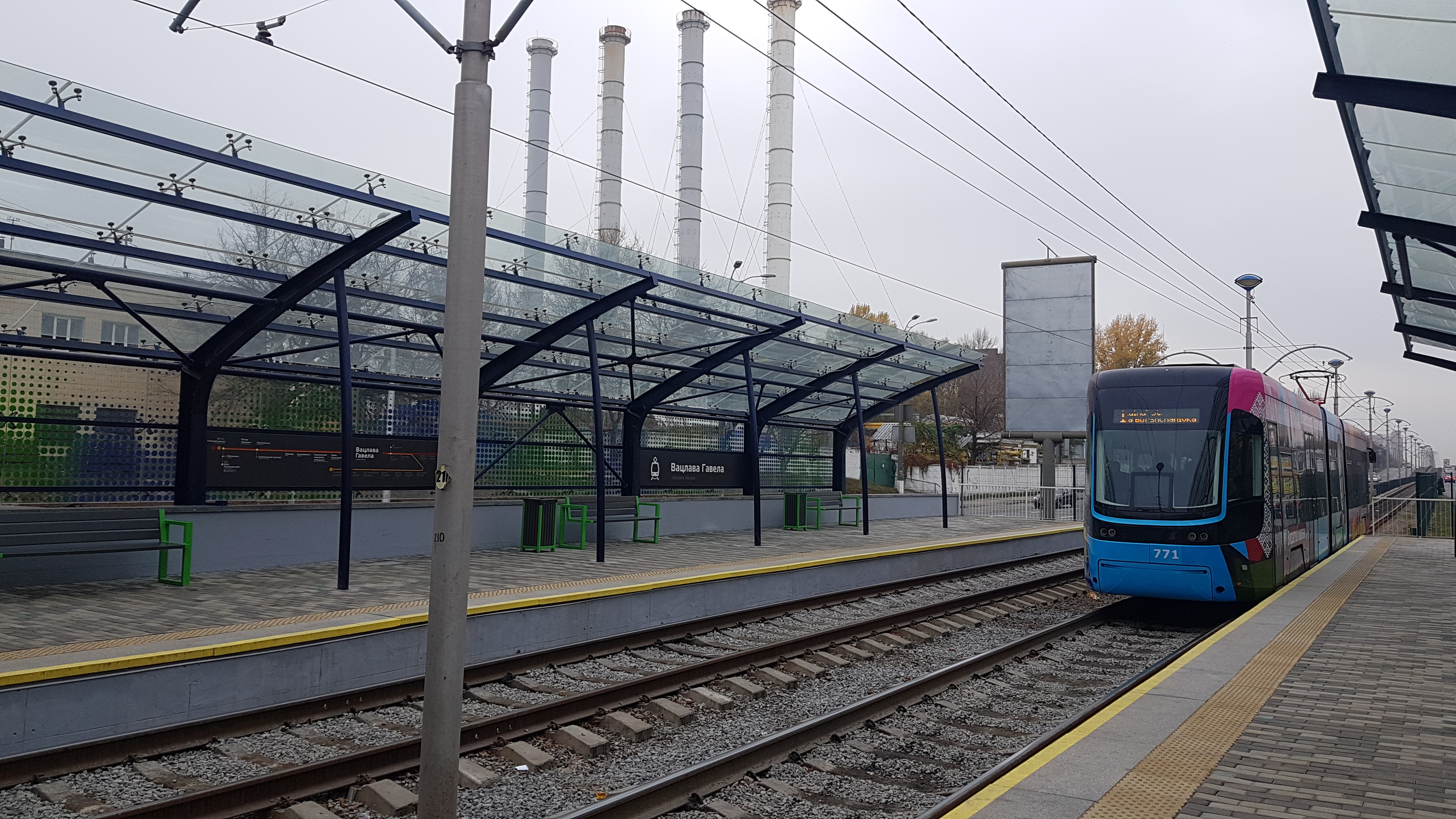

General information
- Coordinates: 50°26′9″N 30°24′38″E
- Owner: Kyivpastrans
- Line: Pravoberezhna line

History
- Opened: 1977

Services
Preceding station	Kyiv Light Rail	Following station
Ivana Dziuby towards Mykhailivska Borshchavihka	Line 1	Akademika Shalimova towards Starovokzalna
Ivana Dziuby towards Kiltseva Doroha	Line 3	Akademika Shalimova towards Starovokzalna
Location

Vatslava Havela (Ukrainian: Вацлава Гавела) is a station on the Kyiv Light Rail in Kyiv, Ukraine. It was opened in 1977. Before 2018, the station was called Ivana Lepse (Ukrainian: Івана Лепсе)
