= Pravoberezhna line =

Kyiv Light Rail line

Pravoberezhna Line
- 1 2 3 The 3 tram runs along the entire Pravoberezhna Line, while the 1 and 2 trams run along sections of it

Overview
- Locale: Kyiv, Ukraine
- Termini: Kiltseva Doroha; Starovokzalna
- Stations: 13 (11 active)

Service
- Type: Light rail
- System: Kyiv Light Rail
- Operator: Kyivpastrans

History
- Opened: February 1, 1975

Technical
- Line length: 9.5 km (5.9 mi)
- Track gauge: 1,524 mm (5 ft)

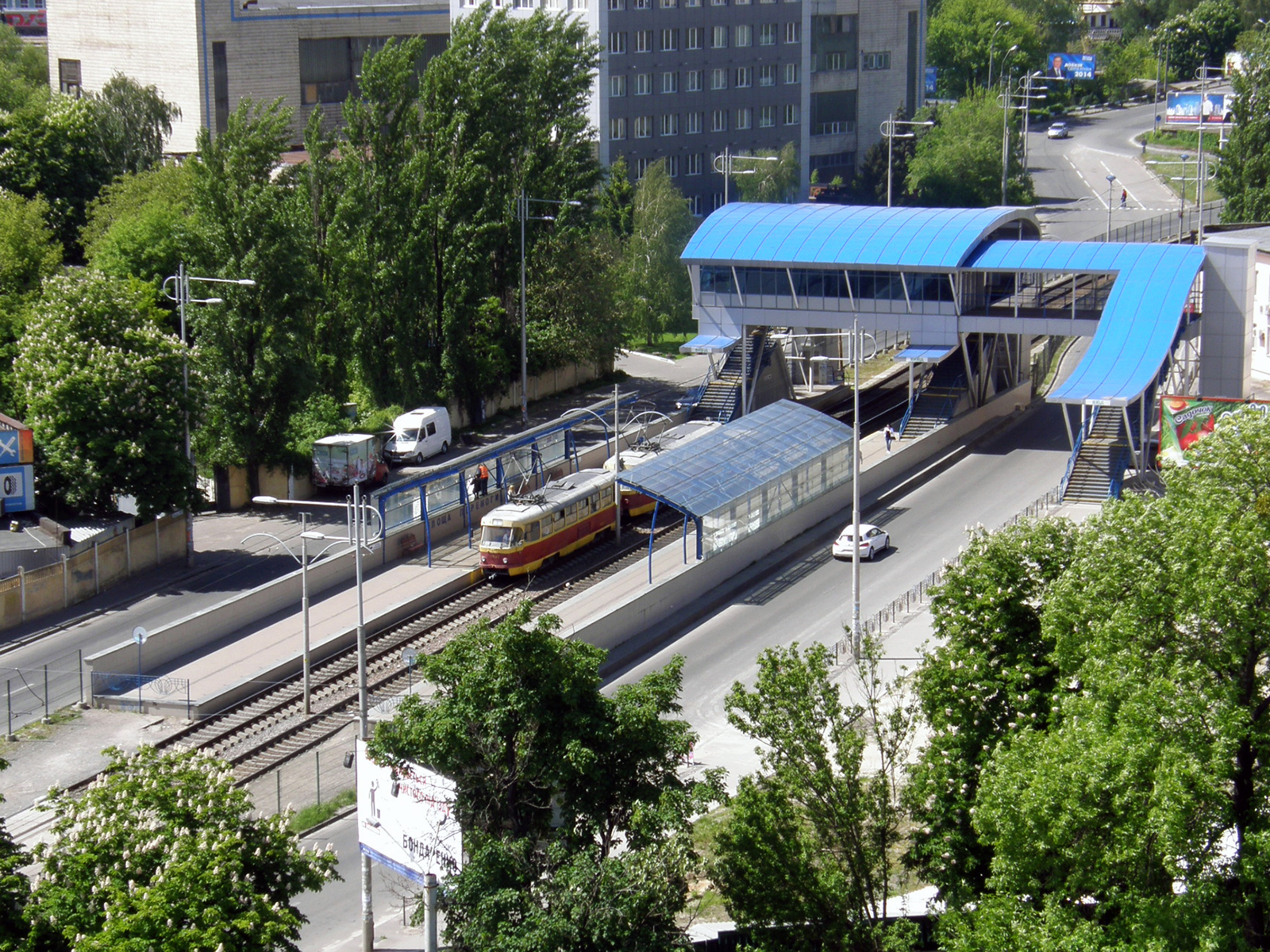
Ploshcha Halytska station

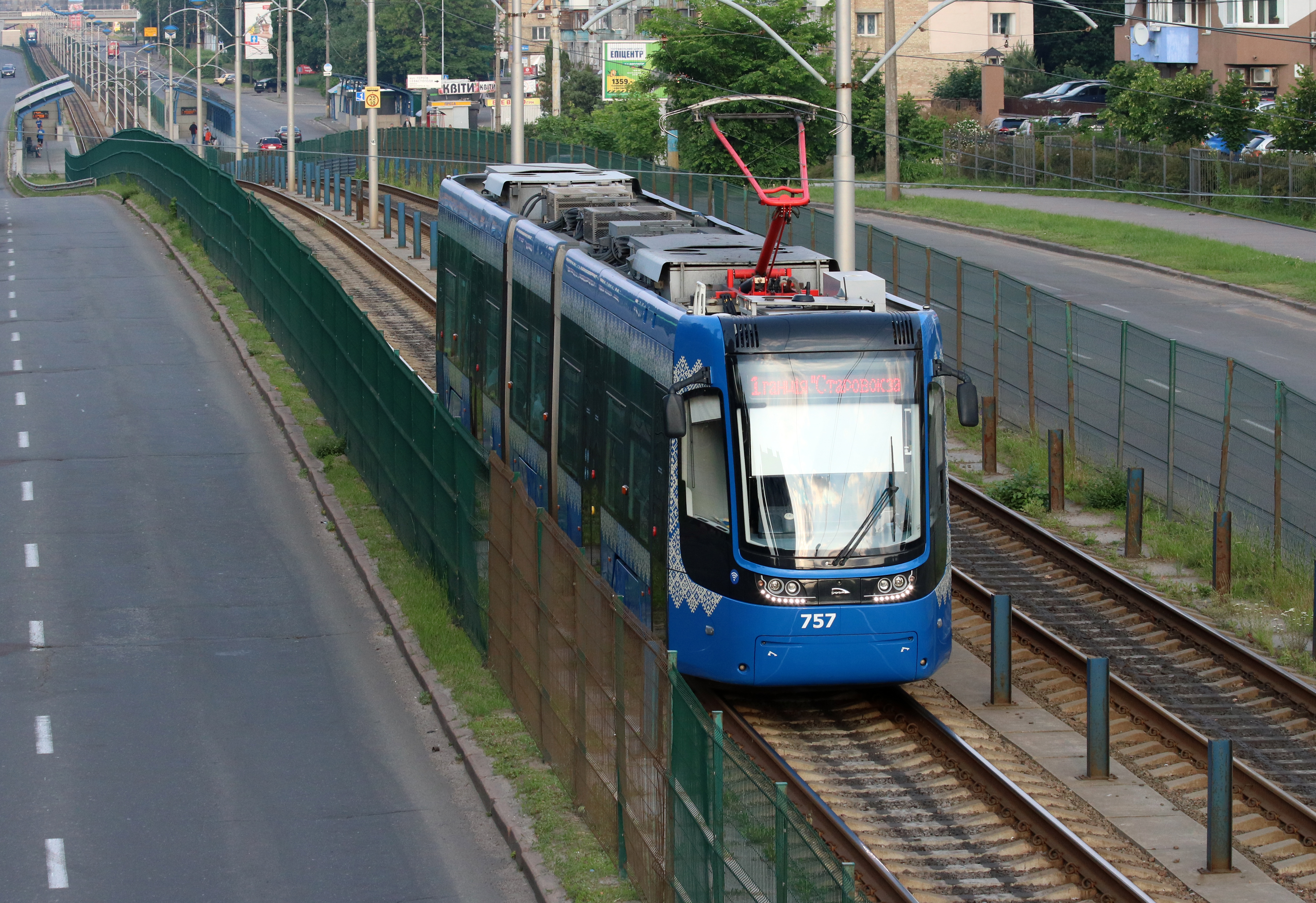
PESA Fokstrot tram

The Pravoberezhna Line (lit. 'Right-bank line') or Borshchahivka Rapid Tram is the first line of the Kyiv Light Rail, located in the western part of Kyiv. Constructed from 1975 onwards, the rail corridor connects central Kyiv near Kyiv Passenger Terminal with Shuliavka and Borshchahivka, before having its terminus at the Kyiv Kiltseva Road. The 1, 2, and 3 trams run along the Pravoberezhna Line, together carrying 150,000 passengers daily.

== List of stations ==
The Pravoberezhna Line consists of a total of eleven full stations, served by routes No 1, No 2, and No 3. It contains a total of 9.5 kilometres (5.9 mi) of track. The line is serviced by the Shevchenko tram depot. Here is a full list of stations on the line:

Station	Transfers	Notes
Prospekt Akademika Koroliova	2	
Mykhailivska Borshchahivka	1	
Vakhtanha Kikabidze	1 2	Before 2024 the station was called Bulgakova.
Hryhorovycha-Barskoho		Permanently closed in 2022.
Oleksandra Makhova	1 2	Before 2023 the station was called Zholudieva.
Mykoly Rudenka	1 2	Before 2024 the station was called Bulvar Koltsova.
Vasylia Domanytskoho	1 2	Before 2023 the station was called Henerala Potapova.
Kiltseva Doroha		Closed during reconstruction.
Zhulia Verna	2 3	Before 2023 the station was called Romena Rollana.
Hnata Yury	1 3	
Ivana Dziuby	1 3	Before 2023 the station was called Simii Sosninykh.
Vatslava Havela	1 3	
Akademika Shalimova	1 3	Before 2024 the station was called Heroiv Sevastopolia.
National Aviation University	1 3	
Industrialna	1 3	
Oleksy Tykhoho	1 3	Before 2020 the station was called Poliova.
Politekhnichna	1 3	
Povitroflotska		Permanently closed.
Ploshcha Halytska	1 3	Before 2023 the station was called Ploshcha Peremohy.
Starovokzalna	1 3 15 18	
