= Kiltseva Doroha (Kyiv Light Rail) =

Kyiv Light Rail station

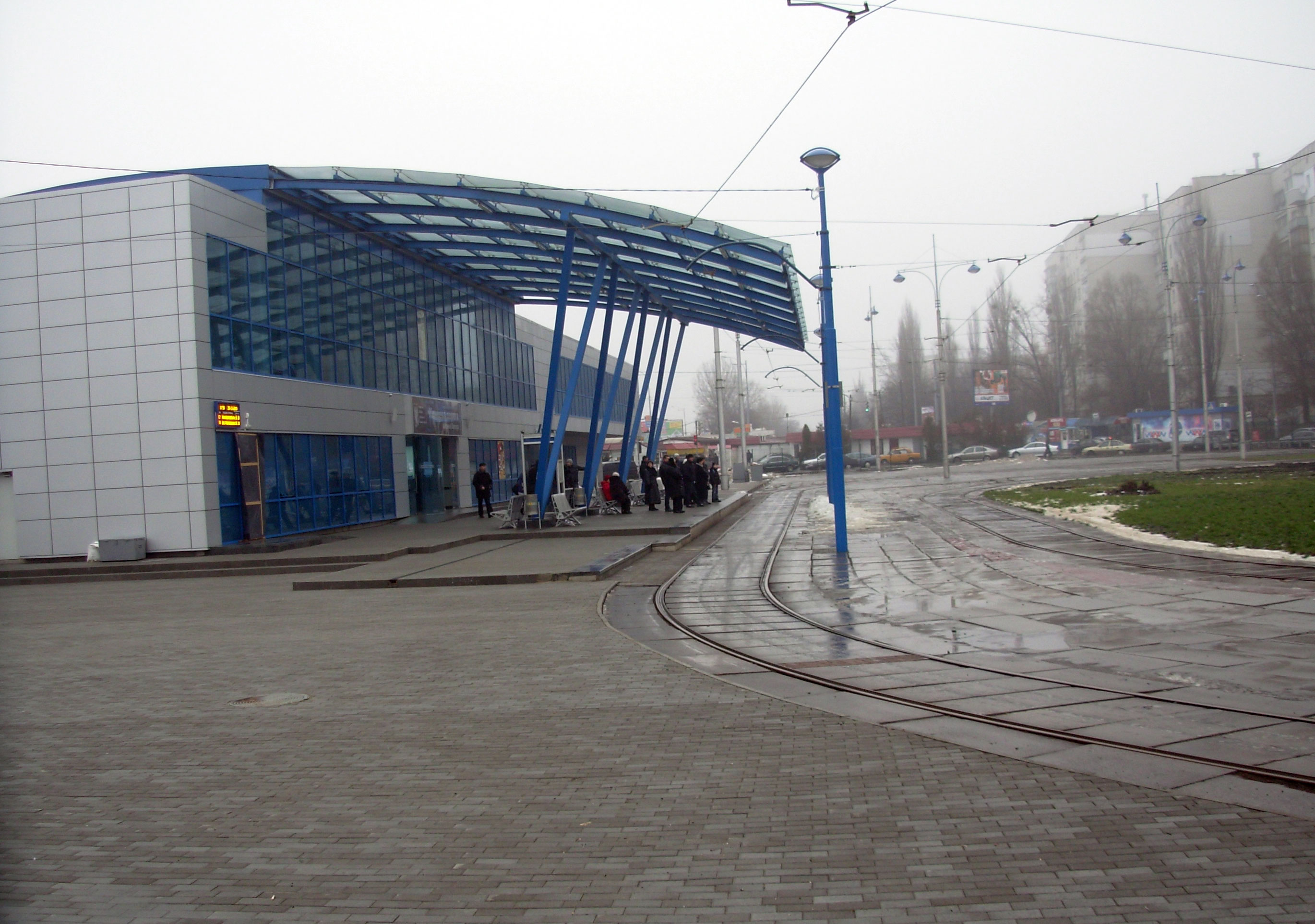

General information
- Coordinates: 50°25′31″N 30°22′02″E
- Owner: Kyivpastrans
- Line: Pravoberezhna line
- Platforms: 1 side platform
- Tracks: Loop

History
- Opened: 1977
- Rebuilt: 2008—2010; 2016—2023

Services
Preceding station	Kyiv Light Rail	Following station
Zhulia Verna towards Prospekt Akademika Koroliova	Line 2	Terminus
Terminus	Line 3	Zhulia Verna towards Starovokzalna
Location

Kiltseva Doroha (Ukrainian: Кільцева дорога) is a station on the Kyiv Light Rail. It was opened in 1977.

== History ==
Kiltseva Doroha station with a balloon loop, one side platform and a dispatcher building was opened in 1977. The balloon loop had a technical tracks with a lot of turning options. In 1980's the road junction was built around the station

In 2008 the station was temporarily closed because of the tram line reconstruction. In 2010 the station reopened after its first reconstruction. The tracks amount decreased from four to just two and the dispatcher building was destroyed to build a new vestibule with a canopy for the platform.

In 2014 the Aprel mall opened on the other side of the junction, occupying the free space inside of it. In 2016 it was decided to expend it by building a new complex called April Mall (later renamed to April City) right on top of the tram station with a connection to the planned April Tower business center, forming an arch on top of the junction.

To start a preparation work one of the loop's tracks was dismantled and the construction was going on around the existing track. Since 2017 the center of the loop was also occupied by construction making a corridor for tracks. In October 2018 the station was completely closed, the vestibule built in 2010 was demolished to make an indoor tram station inside the mall the rails were also changed to new ones so the trams were able to go through the construction without stopping.

The April City caused a controversy, especially since it was building right on the roadway, narrowing it down.
