= Starovokzalna (Kyiv Light Rail) =

Kyiv Light Rail station

General information
- Coordinates: 50°26′38″N 30°29′21″E
- Owner: Kyivpastrans
- Line: Pravoberezhna line
- Platforms: 1 side platform
- Tracks: Loop

History
- Opened: 1989
- Rebuilt: 2010

Services
Preceding station	Kyiv Light Rail	Following station
Ploshcha Halytska towards Mykhailivska Borshchavihka	Line 1	Terminus
Ploshcha Halytska towards Kiltseva Doroha	Line 3	Terminus
Location

Starovokzalna (Ukrainian: Старовокзальна) is the final station of the right-bank line the Kyiv Light Rail, located near the city's main railway station Kyiv-Pasazhyrskyi. It was originally opened in 1989 as a tram stop. On October 16, 2010, the station was reopened after reconstruction to service light rail trams.

== History ==
Until 2007, the station served as a terminus for three routes: No. 1, No. 15, and No. 18. From August to December 2007, the station underwent reconstruction, during which new tracks were laid and the overhead lines were updated. Following the reconstruction in December 2007, the turning loop was used by two regular-service routes: No. 15 and No. 18. Two additional rapid transit routes, No. 1 and No. 3, were planned to launch in 2008.

Starting 13 June 2009, it served as a terminus for tram routes No. 15 and No. 18, as well as replacement bus routes No. 1T and No. 3T, which were introduced in place of tram routes No. 1 and No. 3 during the reconstruction of the rapid transit line.

On 16 October 2010, the rapid tram station reopened following reconstruction. The platform is equipped with a canopy and turnstiles.
