= Trams in Kyiv =

Electric tram system in Kyiv, Ukraine

Kyiv Tram
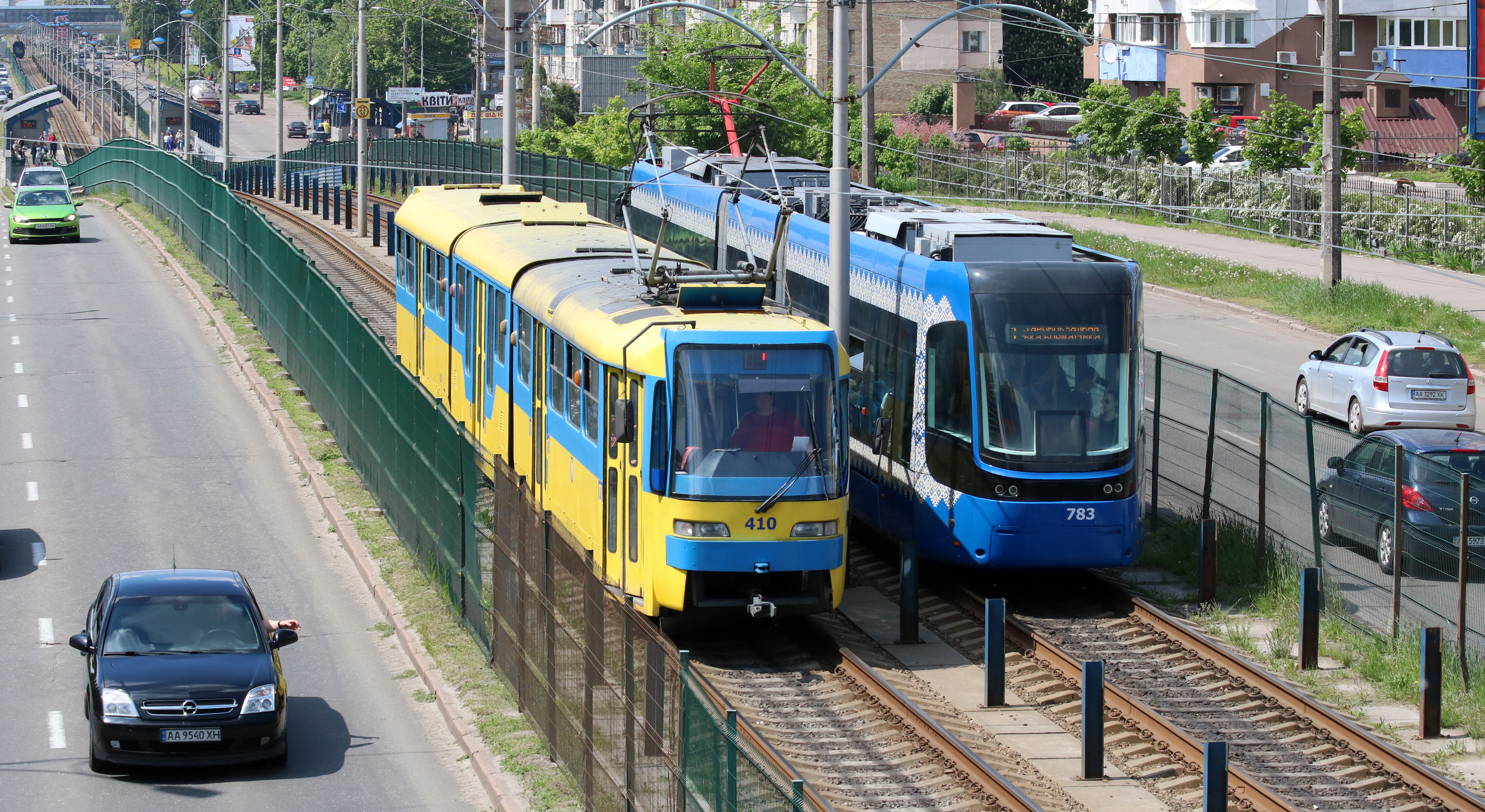
- Rapid trams of Kyiv Light Rail on the Pravoberezhna (Right-bank) Line

Overview
- Native name: Київський Tрамвай
- Owner: Kyivpastrans, Kyiv City Council
- Area served: Darnytsia Raion, Desna Raion, Dnipro Raion, Holosiiv Raion, Obolon Raion, Pechersk Raion, Podil Raion, Shevchenko Raion, Solomianka Raion, Sviatoshyn Raion
- Locale: Kyiv
- Number of lines: 22
- Annual ridership: 114,701,800 (2016)
- Website: https://kpt.kyiv.ua/

Operation
- Began operation: August 11, 1891 (horse-drawn tram); February 1892 (steam tram); June 13, 1892 (electric tram)
- Number of vehicles: 456

Technical
- System length: 230 kilometres (140 mi) (2017)
- Track gauge: 1,524 mm (5 ft)
System map
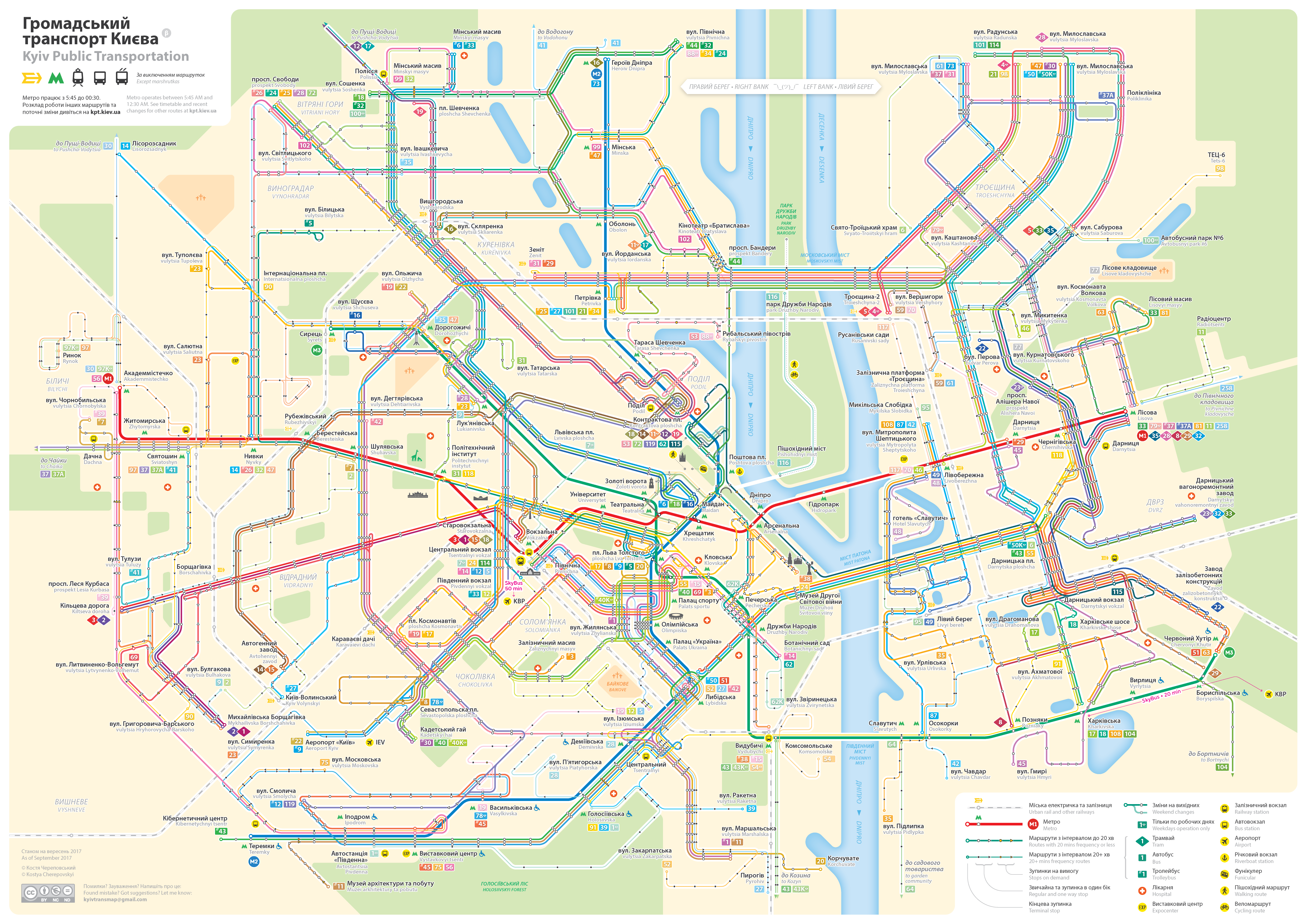

The Kyiv Tram (Ukrainian: Київський трамвай, romanized: Kyivskyi tramvai, pronounced [ˈkɪjiu̯sʲkɪj trɐmˈwɑj]) is a tram network that serves the Ukrainian capital Kyiv. The system was the first electric tramway in the former Russian Empire and the fourth one in Europe after the Berlin, Budapest, and Prague tramways. The Kyiv Tram system currently consists of 139.9 km (86.9 mi) of the track, including 14 km (8.7 mi) of two Rapid Tram lines, served by 21 routes with the use of 523 tram cars. However, the system is being neglected, the serviced track length is decreasing at a fast rate and is replaced by buses and trolleybuses.

The Kyiv Tram system is operated by the municipal company Kyivpastrans, which also maintains bus, Kyiv trolleybus, and Kyiv Funicular transport in Kyiv.

== History ==
=== During the Russian Empire ===
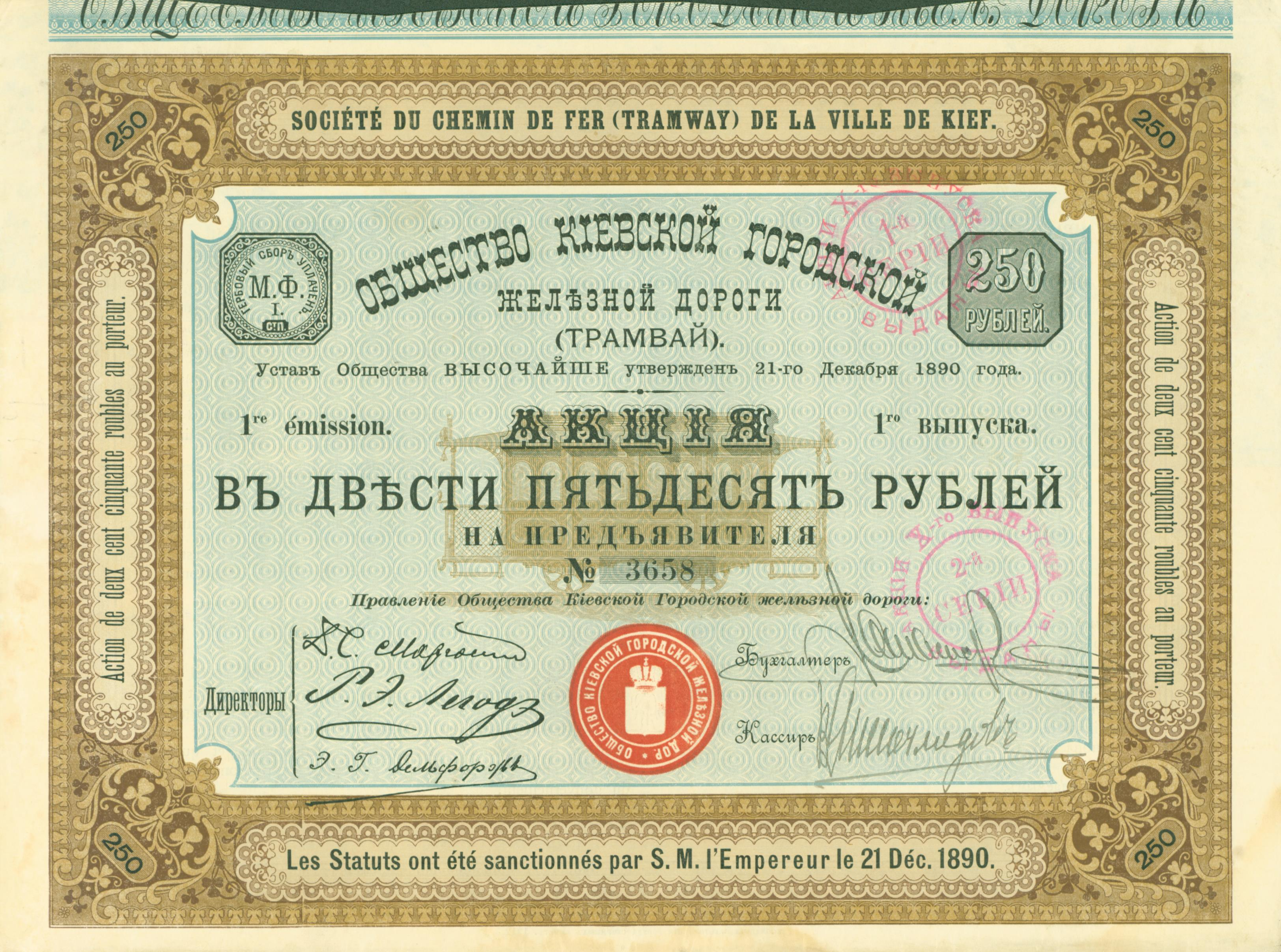
Share of the Société du Chemin de Fer (Tramway) de la Ville de Kief, issued 21 December 1890

Before 1886, projects for the construction of a horse-drawn tramway were planned. However, none of these plans had ever proceeded to the construction stage. In 1886, engineer Amand Struve's project was approved for construction, and the Kyiv City Railway Society joint-stock company was founded in 1889.

On June 30, 1891, after the opening ceremony, the first horse-drawn tramcar was set on its track. The official tram operation from Lybidska Square to Mariinsko-Blahovishchynska Street (now Saksahanskoho Street) began on August 11. By August 18, the tram line stretched from Tsarska Square (now Yevropeiska Square) to the Demiivska Square. November 7 the Podil tram line from Troitske Tram Depot (now Podilske Tram Depot) to Oleksandrivska Square (now Kontraktova Square) had been opened.

Soon after tram operations were started, many problems arose. The hilly terrain of Kyiv presented the largest problem. When the Podil line was extended to the Poshtova Square, a pair of horses was not enough to pull a tramcar uphill. Therefore, another two pairs of horses were added, which did not improve the situation. Thus, mechanizing the tramway by using steam-powered tramway engines was attempted as a solution to the problem. However, the steam engines produced a lot of noise, which scared the horses and people, and produced significant amounts of air pollution. Between September 1891 and February 1892, the line on Oleksandrivskyi Descent (now Volodymyrskyi Descent) was constructed.

The slew of problems experienced by the trams shocked Struve, who, in 1890, had written a letter to the City Administration of Kyiv suggesting that for increased safety and easier use, the trams would need to be powered by electricity. The administration of the Kyiv Telegraph Service opposed this move since, in their opinion, the electric motors would interfere with the telephone and telegraph systems.

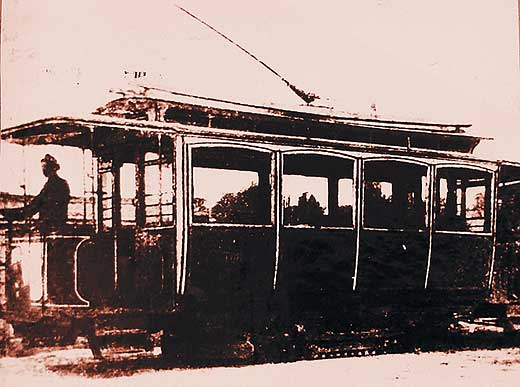
One of the earliest Kyiv tramcars, constructed by the Struve brothers (1892), based on American designs.

On May 3, 1892, the first two electric trams arrived in Kyiv. They were built by the Struve brothers in a factory located near Moscow, based on American designs. The same day, the tramcars were tested on the flat Oleksandrivska Street (now Sahaidachnoho Street), and again, on May 8, on the track from Podil Street to Khreshchatyk Street. On June 9, the trams were tested by special commission and began passenger service on June 13.

In 1893, the money earned by the electric trams exceeded the costs of maintenance. Furthermore, the electric trams were used whenever the horse-drawn or steam-powered trams had difficulty. Nevertheless, the system's horse-drawn trams were in use until 1895, and the last steam-powered cars ran until 1904.

By 1893, the city's trams easily climbed the many steep streets of Kyiv, including Prorizna Street, Kruhlouniversytetska Street and Karavaievska Square (now Ukrainskykh Heroiv Square). In 1893, the Elektrichestvo journal wrote:

If Kyiv's terrain had not been so unique, then it would have taken many years before electricity would have been used to power the trams.

— Elektrichestvo journal

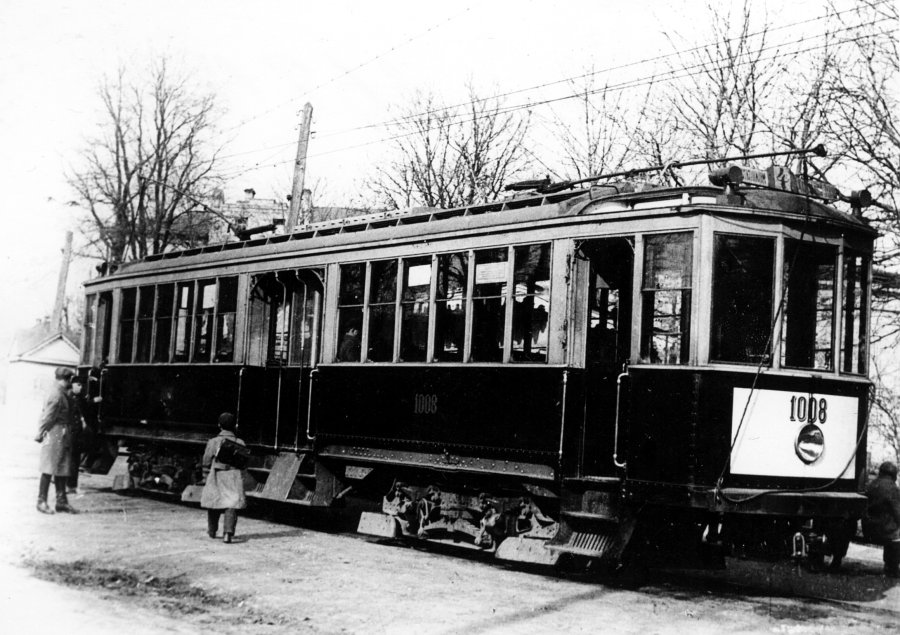
Belgian Pullman cars, modernized by the Kyiv tram factory, were used throughout the 1930s

A major problem for the tram drivers at the time was the rolling stock used. When the city's railroad stockholder Lazar Brodsky died, the stock was transferred to a Belgian auction firm, and the tram system began running with Belgian Pullman tramcars with soft, sail-type cloth seats. But neither these, nor the earlier seats on the German tramcars, gave the tram drivers any comfort while standing in wind, rain, or snow, on the driver's platform on the tram.

In 1900 the tram network expanded to Pushcha-Vodytsia. In 1912, a long gasoline tram line about 17 versts (18 km) long, was laid from the Poshtova Square, across the Dnipro river on the Mykolaivskyi Bridge, through the Peredmostna and Nikolska Slobodka neighborhoods, and to the neighboring town of Brovary. The line was used until the mid-1930s, and was a single line with passing places. This made the trip seem longer than it really was. The cost was 35 kopecks, a fair amount of money at the time. Nevertheless, the trams were always packed with passengers.

=== During the Soviet Union ===
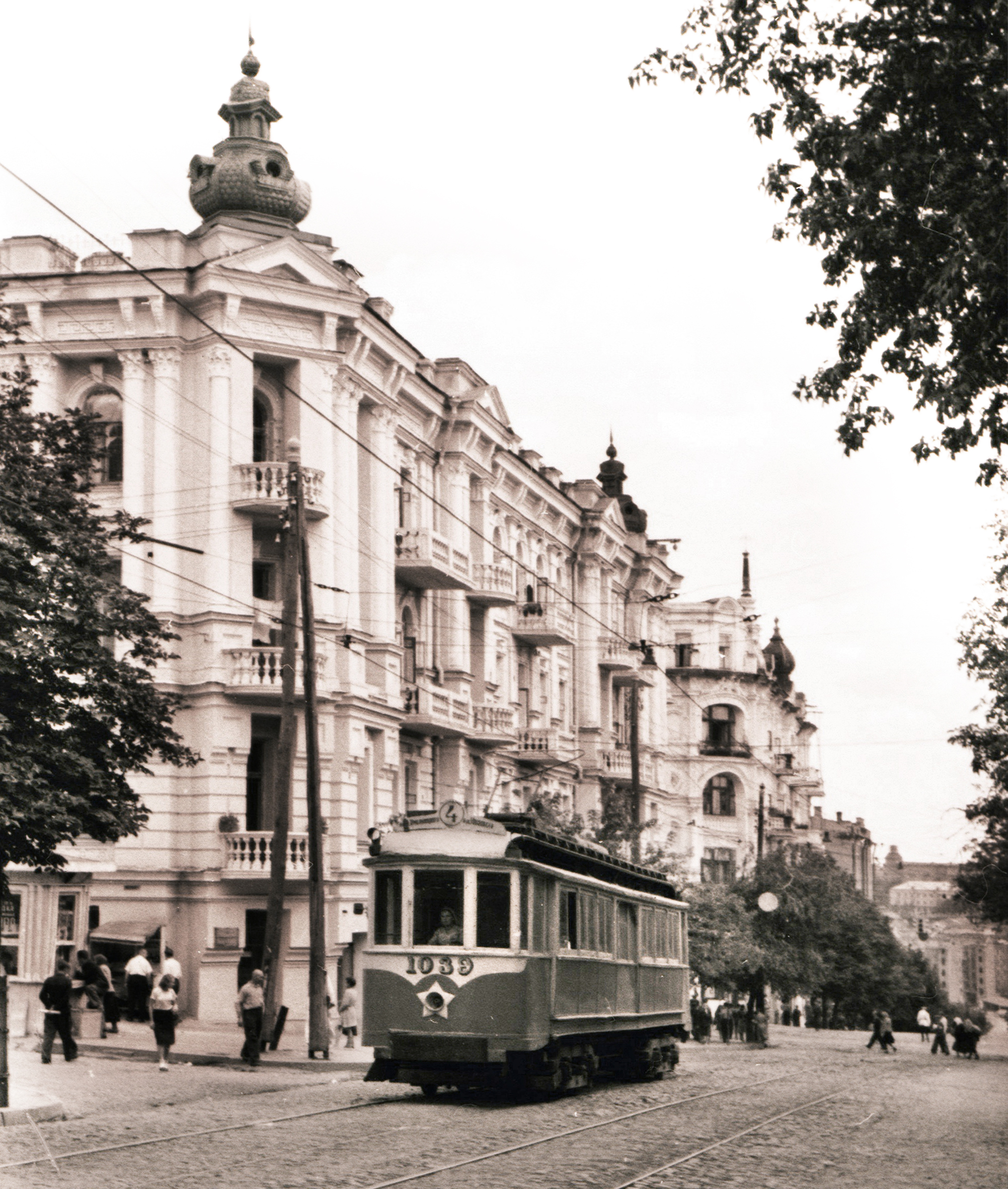
Pullman tramcar at Yaroslaviv Val Street in 1930s

After the Russian Revolution and the Russian Civil War, reconstruction of the tramway system began. Several tram lines were dismantled and were not rebuilt. The privately held lines were connected with the state-owned ones and several new ones were built. In 1924, trams begin to operate at Solomianka, and in 1926 the line at Bulionska Street (now Kazymyra Malevycha Street) was built.

The old and outdated tramcars required restoration, as the industry of the country could not manufacture new rolling stock. The reconstruction was carried out in the main tram depot of the system, the Dombal Depot, which would later become the Kyiv Electric Transport Factory. From 1928 to 1932, 80 two-axle motor tramcars and 65 trailer cars were manufactured for Kyiv. From 1932, the depot started producing four-axle tramcars. In these tramcars, the motorman's area was separated from the passenger saloon, but was not warmed during the winter.

In the 1930s, various tram expansion projects were proposed, featuring the lines in Shevchenkivskyi and Solomianskyi Districts, as well as connections with the left bank of the city. Most of the projects were cancelled because of the introduction of the Kyiv trolleybus system, which also caused the dismantling of the tram line in city center.

In 1932, the line at Ivana Fedorova Street was built. In 1934, the line at Dehtyarivska Street was opened. In 1935, the tram began to operate at Tymiryazievska Street (now Sadovo-Botanichna Street), as well as the Pechersk line. In 1936, the tram network reached the Darnytsia Wagon Repair Plant (DVRZ).

In 1941, Nazi Germany attacked the Soviet Union. During the first battle of Kyiv in September, tram operation was stopped. Under Nazi occupation, the tram worked intermittently and mostly for freight purposes. During the second battle in 1943, its operation was stopped again. The tram network in the city center incurred heavy damage, which would not be restored during the war. After the war, the tram was used for garbage removal during the repair works.

In 1951, the tram line at Klovskyi Descent was opened, but other central lines were dismantled around the same time. In 1954, the tram line at Paton Bridge was opened, reconnecting two banks after the war. In 1956, the line at Diahonalna Street (now Leonida Kadenyuka Avenue) was opened. In 1958, the tram began to operate at Kharkivske Highway.

In the 1960s, the Soviet Union acquired tramcars from ČKD. Unlike the Soviet ones, they only had one cabin, which caused the dismantling of many dead-end lines and which lasted until the 1980s.

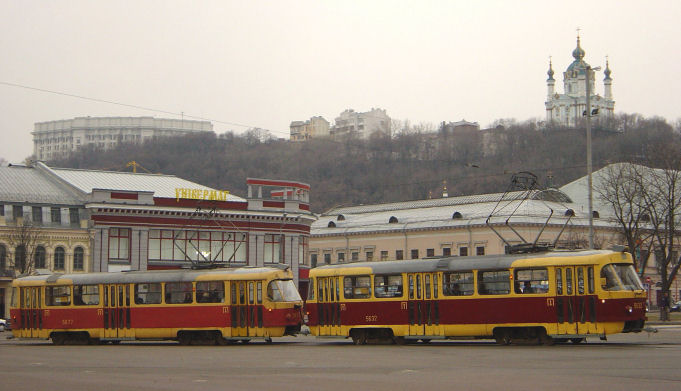
The ČKD Tatra-T3SU tram cars are the most common tram cars seen in Kyiv. Here the tram cars are on the Kontraktova Square, with the roofs of St. Andrew's Church in the background.

On March 13, 1961, a major landslide hit the city's Podilske Tram Depot, burying it in clay sludge and killing most personnel on site. Additionally, dozens of people died in the tram cars and buses caught in the landslide and subsequent electrical fault and short circuit on the street intersection immediately next to the depot.

Between 1961 and 1968, the tram network was expanded from Dehtiarivska Street to 50-richchia Zhovtnia Avenue (now Lesia Kurbasa Avenue) at the right bank and from Tashkentska Street to Myropilska Street at the left bank. Several unpopular lines had been closed.

In the 1970s, a tram line was built at Kurenivka. On April 11, 1977, the first line of the Kyiv tram stopped operating. In 1978, a line at Brest-Lytovskyi Avenue (now Beresteiskyi Avenue) was partially dismantled. The remaining part operated until 1982.

On December 30, 1978, the first high-speed tram line in the then Soviet Union was opened in Kyiv. It connected the Peremohy Square (present-day Halytska Square) with the Pivdenna Borshchahivka housing estate. The same year, Kyiv experienced a historical peak in tram route development: the length of the lines reached 285 km, the fleet numbered 909 cars, and passenger traffic per year exceeded 396 million people.

In 1980, a tram line through the recently built Obolon neighborhood was built. In 1982, the left bank tram line was expanded to Mykoly Kybalchycha Street. In 1985, the line at Lesi Ukrainky Boulevard was closed. In 1986, a new tram line was opened at Troieshchyna neighborhood. In 1987, a tram line was opened in the newly built Kharkivskyi neighborhood, while the last dead-end line at Lva Tolstoho Street (now Hetmana Skoropadskoho Street) was dismantled. In 1991, the line at Hoholivska Street was closed.

=== Independent Ukraine ===
In 1992, new rails near the Darnytske Tram Depot were opened.

In 1994, the line at Troieshchyna was expanded to Myloslavska Street.

The period of stagnation of the Kyiv tram network is usually associated with Oleksandr Omelchenko, who became the mayor of Kyiv in August of 1996. During his administration from 1996 to 2006, the city began car-centric development; the tram was believed to cause traffic jams.

In August 1996, the ring lines were dismantled in front of Kyiv-Pasazhyrskyi railway station and at Vorovskoho Street (now Bulvarno-Kudriavska Street).

In 1998, the line at Pechersk was closed.

In 2001, the ring terminus near the Palace of Sports was dismantled; its former location was sold to build the Gulliver skyscraper which was the tallest building in Ukraine for some time.

In 2004, the Kyiv tram network was separated in two after the line at Paton bridge was dismantled. The bridge was in a poor state already, and the tram removal was an attempt to save it. The decision was controversial: it was unannounced and residents did not know how to get to their jobs on the other bank of Kyiv after learning about the route change right at the tram stop. Eventually, further reconstruction on the bridge caused more traffic jams on the newly added lines that only worsened the structure's state.

== In culture ==
The Kyiv tram system is the object of "Kiever tramvay", a popular humorous song composed in a mix of Yiddish and the local dialect of Russian, which was most likely created during the 1930s. According to Psoy Korolenko, the song is a later creation by Vitaly Krestovsky (born 1942). It became popular in the 1970s Soviet underground music scene, being performed by Yan Tabachnik, among others.

== Routes ==
As of December 26, 2023, the following routes are in effect:

Temporarily not working (see details in the notes)
Temporary or temporarily changed route (see opening hours in the notes)

Route	Schedule	Terminus	Terminus	Via	Notes
1		Mykhailivska Borshchavihka	Starovokzalna station	Symyrenka Street — Koltsova Boulevard — Volodymyra Pokotyla Street — Lesia Kurbasa Avenue — Liubomyra Huzara Avenue — Borshchahivska Street — Zhylianska Street —Starovokzalna Street	Forms part of the Pravoberezhna Line of the Kyiv Light Rail.
2		Prospekt Akademika Koroliova	Kiltseva Road station	Akademika Koroliova Avenue — Symyrenka Street — Koltsova Boulevard — Volodymyra Pokotyla Street — Lesia Kurbasa Avenue	Forms part of the Pravoberezhna Line of the Kyiv Light Rail.
3		Kiltseva Road station	Starovokzalna station	Kiltseva Road — Lesia Kurbasa Avenue — Liubomyra Huzara Avenue — Borshchahivska Street — Zhylianska Street —Starovokzalna Street	Forms part of the Pravoberezhna Line of the Kyiv Light Rail.
4		Raiduzhnyi station	Myloslavska station	Petra Vershyhory Street — Onore de Balzaka Street	Forms part of the Livoberezhna Line of the Kyiv Light Rail. Works only on weekdays and in peak hours.
5		Raiduzhnyi station	Serzha Lyfaria Street	Petra Vershyhory Street — Onore de Balzaka Street — Myloslavska Street — Mykoly Zakrevskoho Street	Forms part of the Livoberezhna Line of the Kyiv Light Rail.
8		Lisova station	Pozniaky station	Hetmana Pavla Polubotka Street — Leonida Kadeniuka Avenue — Hnata Khotkevycha Street — Pavla Usenka Street — Plastova Street — Kharkivske Highway — Pryvokzalna Street — Yaltynska Street — Denysa Antipova Street — Trostianetska Street — Anny Akhmatovoii Street — Petra Hryhorenka Avenue	
11		Yordanska Street	Kontraktova Square	Yordanska Street — Heroiv Polku "Azov" — Dorbyninska Street — Semena Skliarenka Street — Petropavlivska Square — Kyrylivska Street — Shchekavytska Street (other direction: Olenivska Street) — Kostiantynivska Street (other direction: Mezhyhirska Street) — Spaska Street — Kontraktova Square	Temporarily suspended during construction on the segment from Shchekavytska Street to Podilske depot.
11K		Yordanska Street	Kontraktova Square	Yordanska Street — Heroiv Polku "Azov" — Dorbyninska Street — Semena Skliarenka Street — Petropavlivska Square — Kyrylivska Street	Temporary route during construction on the segment from Shchekavytska Street to Podilske depot. Works only on weekdays.
12		14th Lane, Pushcha-Vodytsia	Kontraktova Square	Mykoly Yunkerova Street — 5th Lane — Fedora Maksymenka Street — forest highway — Pushcha-Vodytska Street — Tarasa Shevchenka Square — Poliarna Street — Avtozavodska Street — Semena Skliarenka Street — Petropavlivska Square — Kyrylivska Street — Shchekavytska Street (other direction: Olenivska Street) — Kostiantynivska Street (other direction: Mezhyhirska Street) — Spaska Street — Kontraktova Square	Temporarily suspended during construction on the segment from Shchekavytska Street to Podilske depot.
12K		14th Lane, Pushcha-Vodytsia	Kontraktova Square	Mykoly Yunkerova Street — 5th Lane — Fedora Maksymenka Street — forest highway — Pushcha-Vodytska Street — Tarasa Shevchenka Square — Poliarna Street — Avtozavodska Street — Semena Skliarenka Street — Petropavlivska Square — Kyrylivska Street	Temporary route during construction on the segment from Shchekavytska Street to Podilske depot.
14		Vidradnyi Avenue	Kontraktova Square	Vidradnyi Avenue — Vatslava Havela Boulevard — Mykoly Vasylenka Street — Dehtiarivska Street — Dmytrivska Street — Hlybochytska Street — Nyzhnii Val Street — Verkhnii Val Street — Kostiantynivska Street (other direction: Mezhyhirska Street) — Spaska Street — Kontraktova Square	
15		Vidradnyi Avenue	Starovokzalna station	Vidradnyi Avenue — Vatslava Havela Boulevard — Mykoly Vasylenka Street — Dehtiarivska Street — Dmytrivska Street — Bulvarno-Kudriavska Street — Zhylianska Street	
16		Heroiv Dnipra station	Kontraktova Square	Heroiv Dnipra Street — Zoi Haidai Street — Levka Lukianenka Street — Heoriv Polku "Azov" Street — Dorbyninska Street — Semena Skliarenka Street — Petropavlivska Squre — Kyrylivska Street — Shchekavytska Street (other direction: Olenivska Street) — Kostiantynivska Street (other direction: Mezhyhirska Street) — Spaska Street — Kontraktova Square	Temporarily suspended during construction on the segment from Shchekavytska Street to Podilske depot.
16К		Heroiv Dnipra station	Kontraktova Square	Heroiv Dnipra Street — Zoi Haidai Street — Levka Lukianenka Street — Heoriv Polku "Azov" Street — Dorbyninska Street — Semena Skliarenka Street — Petropavlivska Squre — Kyrylivska Street	Temporary route during construction on the segment from Shchekavytska Street to Podilske depot.
17		Yordanska Street	14th Lane, Pushcha Vodytsia	Yordanska Street — Heroiv Polku "Azov" Street — Dorbyninska Street — Semena Skliarenka Street — Avtozavodksa Street — Poliarna Street — Tarasa Shevchenka Square — Pushcha-Vodytska Street — forest highway — Fedora Maksymenka Street — 5th Lane — Mykoly Yunkerova Street	
18		Kontraktova Square	Starovokzalna station	Kontraktova Square — Spaska Street — Mezhyhirska Street (other direction: Kostiantynivska Street) — Nyzhnii Val Street (other direction: Verkhnii Val Street) — Hlybochytska Street — Dmytrivska Street — Bulvarno-Kudriavska Street — Zhylianska Street — Starovokzalna Street	
19		Kontraktova Square	Tarasa Shevchenka Square	Kontraktova Square — Spaska Street — Mezhyhirska Street (other direction: Kostiantynivska Street) — Shchekavytska Street (other direction: Olenivska Street) — Kyrylivska Street — Semena Skliarenka Street — Avtozavodska Street — Poliarna Street — Tarasa Shevchenka Square	Temporarily suspended during construction on the segment from Shchekavytska Street to Podilske depot.
19К		Kontraktova Square	Tarasa Shevchenka Square	Kyrylivska Street — Semena Skliarenka Street — Avtozavodska Street — Poliarna Street — Tarasa Shevchenka Square	Temporary route during construction on the segment from Shchekavytska Street to Podilske depot.
22		Plant of Reinforced Concrete Structures (ZZBK)	Perova Boulevard	Boryspilska Street — Pryvokzalna Street — Kharkivske Highway — Plastova Street — Pavla Usenka Street — Hnata Khotkevycha Street — Bratyslavska Street — Myropilska Street — Ostafiia Dashkevycha Street — Suleimana Stalskoho Street — Perova Boulevard	
23		DVRZ	Alishera Navoii Avenue	Almatynska Street — Prazka Street — Azerbaidzhanska Street — Hnata Khotkevycha Street — Bratyslavska Street — Myropilska Street — Alishera Navoii Avenue	
25		Pozniaky station	Plant of Reinforced Concrete Structures (ZZBK)	Petra Hryhorenka Avenue — Anny Akhmatovoii Street — Trostianetska Street — Denysa Antipova Street — Yaltynska Street — Pryvokzalna Street — Boryspilska Street	Works only on weekdays. One morning route.
28		Myloslavska Street	Lisova station	Myloslavska Street — Mykoly Zakrevskoho Street — Ronalda Reihana Street — Mykoly Kybalchycha Street — Ostafiia Dashkevycha Street — Myropilska Street — Bratyslavska Street — Hnata Khotkevycha Street — Leonida Kadeniuka — Hetmana Pavla Polubotka Street	
28D		Myloslavska Street	Plant of Reinforced Concrete Structures (ZZBK)	Myloslavska Street — Mykoly Zakrevskoho Street — Ronalda Reihana Street — Mykoly Kybalchycha Street — Ostafiia Dashkevycha Street — Myropilska Street — Bratyslavska Street — Hnata Khotkevycha Street — Pavla Usenka Street — Plastova Street — Kharkivska Highway — Pryvokzalna Street — Boryspilska Street	One morning route.
29		Boryspilska station	Lisova station	Tashkentska Street — Volodymyra Rybaka Street — Denysa Antipova Street — Yaltynska Street — Pryvokzalna Street — Kharkivske Highway — Plastova Street — Pavla Usenka Street — Hnata Khotkevycha Street — Leonida Kadeniuka Avenue — Hetmana Pavla Polubotka Street	
32		Lisova station	DVRZ	Hetmana Pavla Polubotka Street — Leonida Kadeniuka Avenue — Pavla Usenka Street — Plastova Street — Prazka Street — Almatynska Street	
33		Serzha Lyfaria Street	DVRZ	Hetmana Pavla Polubotka Street — Leonida Kadeniuka Street — Hnata Khotkevycha Street — Pavla Usenka Street — Plastova Street — Prazka Street — Almatynska Street	
35		Serzha Lyfaria Street	Lisova station	Mykoly Zakrevskoho Street — Ronalda Reihana Street — Mykoly Kybalchycha Street — Ostafiia Dashkevycha Street — Myropilska Street — Hnata Khotkevycha Street — Leonida Kadeniuka Avenue — Hetmana Pavla Polubotka Street	

== Rolling stock ==
The Kyiv tram system uses many different tram cars and types, with some being designed in Moscow and manufactured in Riga, some being manufactured by the ČKD Tatra company in Prague, and with some being manufactured right in the city of Kyiv. The following data incorporates only some tram cars used by the system.

=== Current ===
Picture	Manufacturer	Model	Quantity	Since
	(Czech Republic) ČKD Tatra	T3SU (3 doors); T3; T3SUCS	587; 10; 138	1976; 2012; 2013
	(Czech Republic) Pars Nova (Ukraine) KZET	KT3UA	14	2004
	(Ukraine) Tatra-Yug	K1; K1M8; K1M; K1M6	9; 4; 8; 1	2010; 2010; 2012; 2018
	(Czech Republic) Pars Nova (Ukraine) PTS	T3UA-3 Kashtan; K3R-NNP Kashtan-2	6; 1	2012; 2013
	(Ukraine) Electron	T5B64	11	2015
	(Poland) PESA	71-414 Fokstrot	57	2016
	(Czech Republic) ČKD Tatra	T6A5	7	2019
	(Ukraine) Tatra-Yug	K1T306	28	2021

=== Historical ===
Picture	Manufacturer	Model	Quantity	Years
	(Russia) KZ		6	1892–1909
	(Germany) P. Herbrand & Cie.		86	1894–1935
	(Ukraine) KZET		6	1894–1917
	(Poland) Gostyński		16	1899–1917
	(Germany) MAN		61	1904–1951
	(United States) Pullman		88	1909—1962
	(Ukraine) Kuznia na Rybalskomu		129	1911–1955
	(Ukraine) KZET		13	1926–1934
	(Russia) UKVZ (Ukraine) KZET	Kh; 2M	49; 131	1928–1961; 1930–1955
	(Ukraine) KZET	M1	9	1940–1961
	(Russia) UKVZ	KTM-1	65	1948–1966
	(Latvia) RVR (Ukraine) KZET	MTV-82; KTV-55; KTV-57	260; 14; 81	1949–1984; 1955–1984; 1955–1987
	(Russia) PTMZ	LM-57	1	1957–1967
	(Czech Republic) ČKD Tatra	T2SU	51	1960–1987
	(Latvia) RVR	6	25	1962–1969
	(Czech Republic) ČKD Tatra	T3SU (2 doors)	336	1964–2011
	(Czech Republic) ČKD Tatra (Ukraine) Tatra-Yug	T6B5SU; T6B5	95; 2	1985–2025; 1994–2025
	(Russia) PTMZ	71-154M-K	1	2010–2017
	(Belarus) BKM (Ukraine) Bogdan	TR843	1	2012–2025
