= Kyivpastrans =

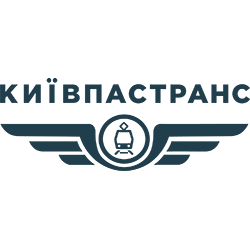
- Predecessor: KP "Kyivelektrotrans"; Kyiv City Territorial-Production Union of Automobile Transport
- Formation: October 2, 2001; 25 years ago
- Founder: Kyiv City Council
- Type: Municipal organization, Other non-liability limited
- Headquarters: Kyiv, Ukraine
- General Director: Mykola Lambutskyi
- Affiliations: 15
- Staff: ~9,500
- Website: kpt.kyiv.ua

Kyivpastrans is a municipal company that operates public transport in Kyiv, the capital of Ukraine. Its operations include electric trams, city buses and trolleybuses. It also operates the Kyiv Funicular and some urban rail lines.

Kyivpastrans was established on October 2, 2001, by the Kyiv City Council to replace KP "Kyivelektrotrans" and the Kyiv City Territorial-Production Union of Automobile Transport.

== Rolling stock and depots ==
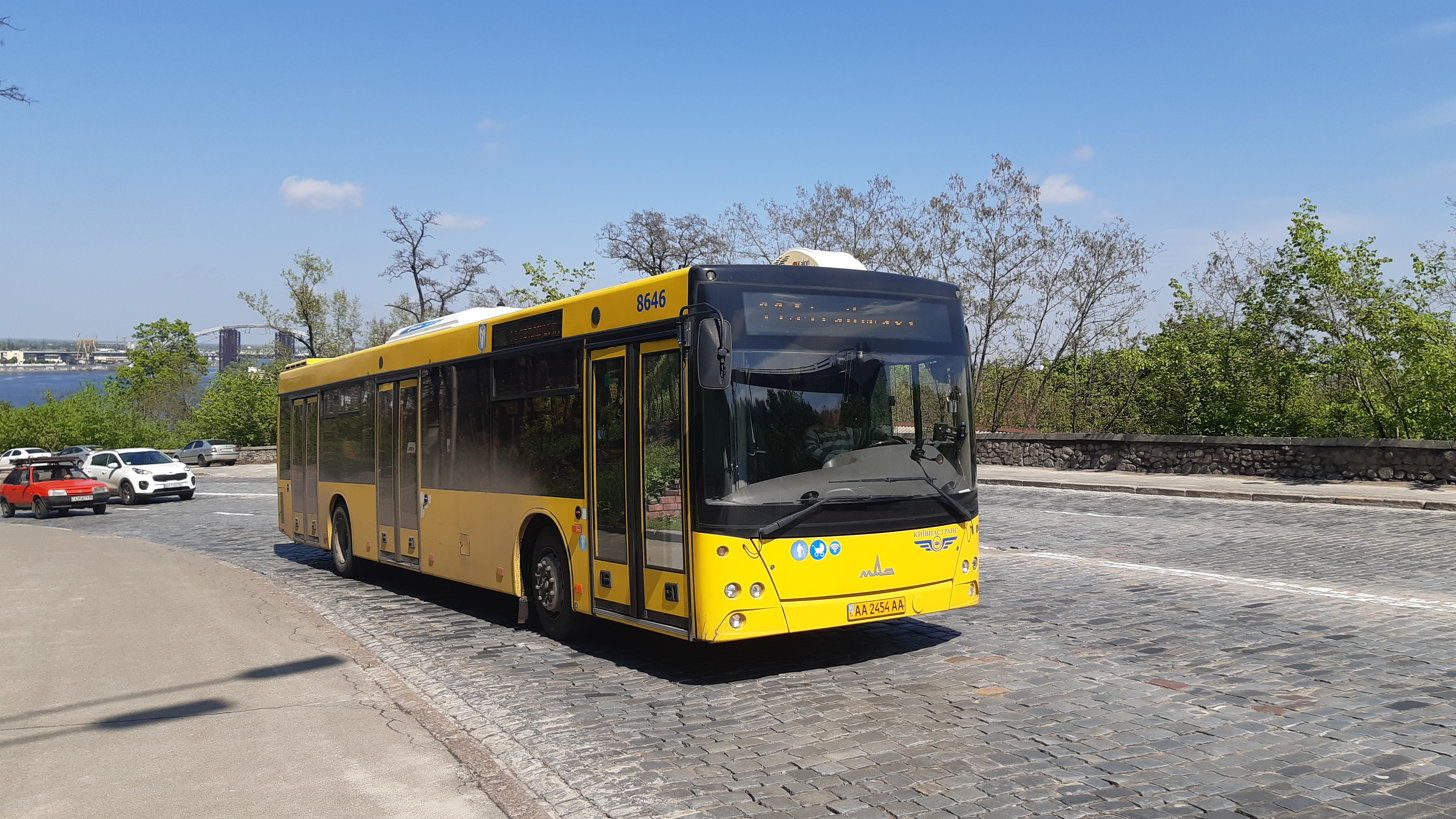
Air conditioned bus on route #114

Kyivpastrans has four bus depots and operates 650 buses that drive 107 routes.

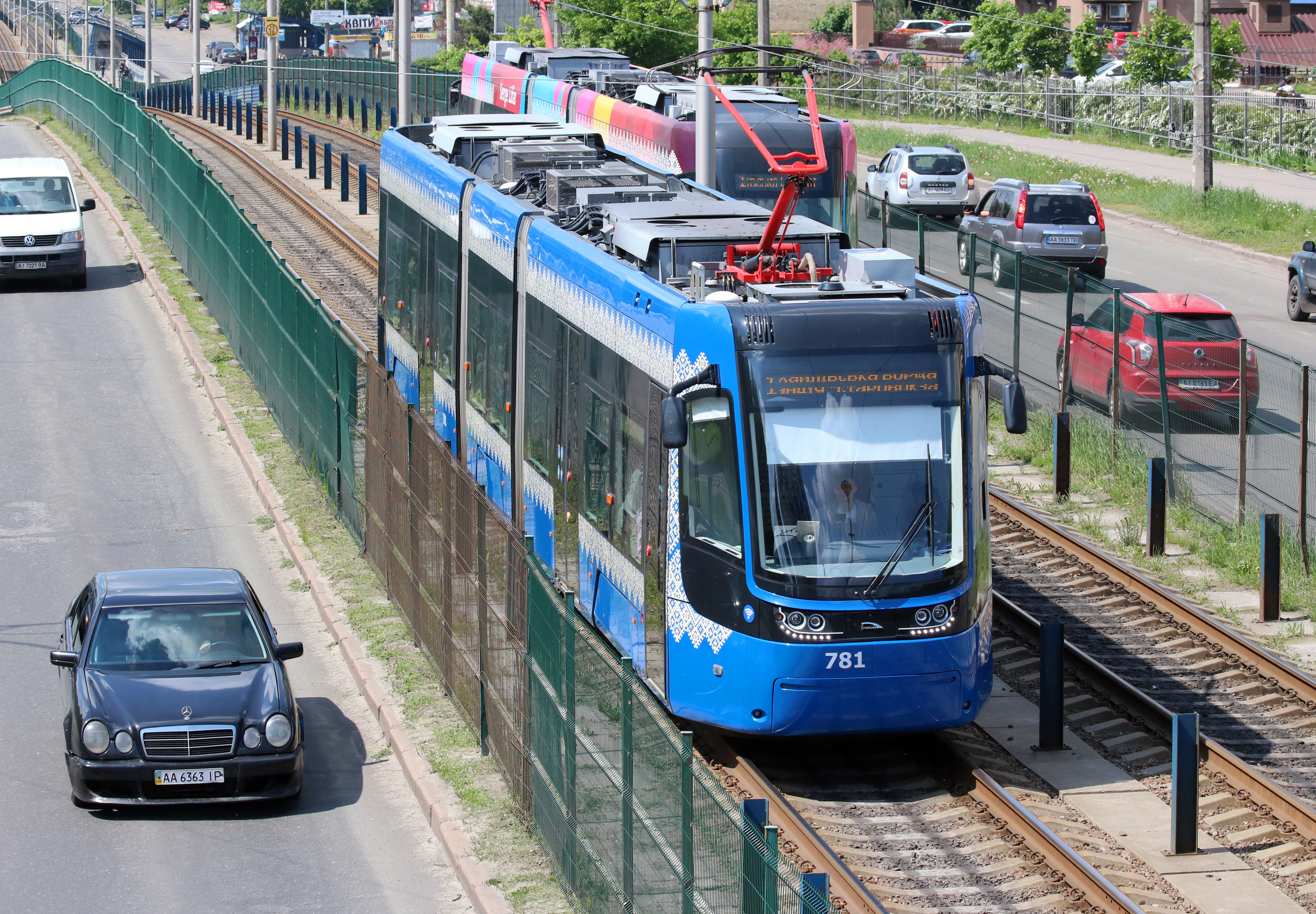
Rapid trams in Kyiv operates routes #1 and 3

The company also has three tram depots: one on the left bank of the Dnieper (in Darnytsia) and two on the right bank. The system serves 21 tram routes in total. LRT routes #1 and 3 are operated by new air-conditioned trams from a dedicated right-bank depot. The most popular tram model used in the system is a modified Tatra T3.

There are three trolleybus depots located on the right bank. In total, the system operates 45 regular trolleybus routes and 4 night routes.

The average lifetime of buses and trolleybuses is 7–18 years.

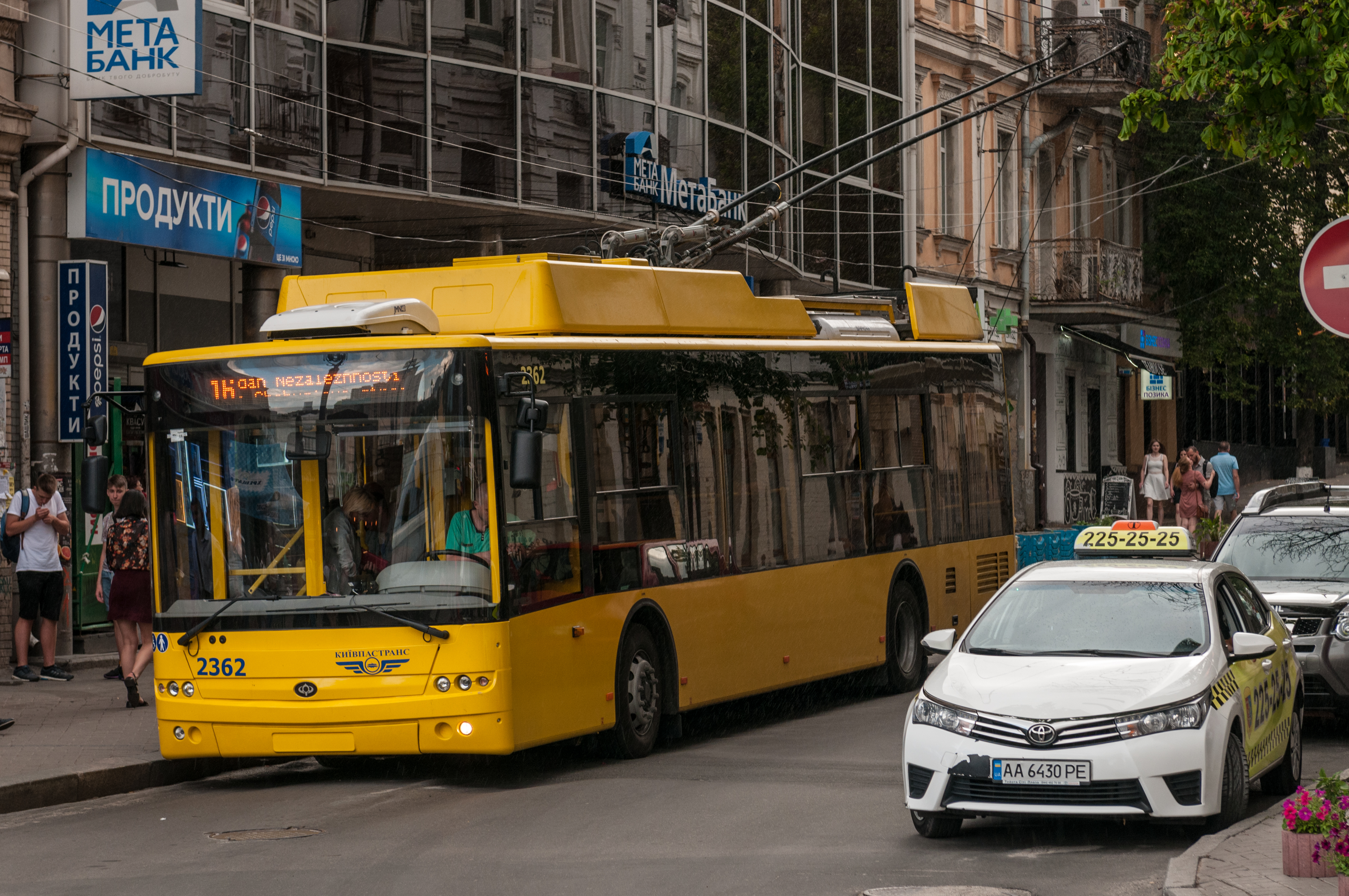
Trolleybus in Kyiv

Buses	Trams	Trolleybuses	
650	335	385	Quantity
7 years	18 years	15 years	Average lifetime

== Fares ==
There are no timed tickets in the system. Each ride can be purchased aboard the vehicle or via Kyivsmartcard (e-ticket) or a QR code purchased online and scanned on board.

In municipal buses, trams and trolleybuses operated by Kyivpastrans one ride cost from ₴6.50 to ₴8.00. These prices are the same in the metro.

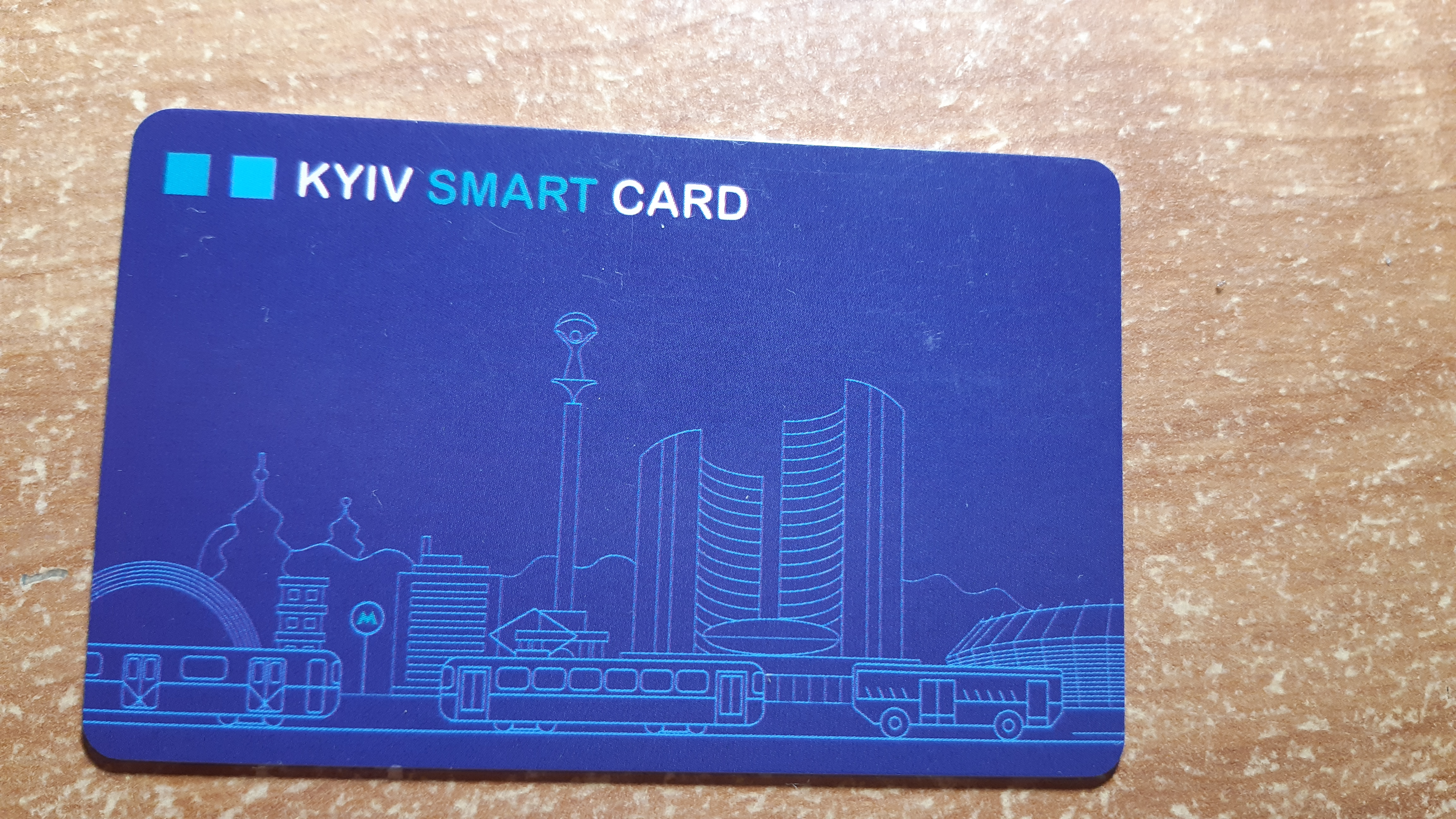
Passengers can pay for riding in municipal transport by Kyivsmartcard.

1 ride - 30 hrn. (qr-code or Kyivsmartcard)

10 rides - 28.90 hrn (by Kyivsmartcard)

50 rides - 25 hrn (by Kyivsmartcard)

The penalty for riding without a valid ticket is ₴160.

One Kyivsmartcard costs ₴50 and must be activated before use.

On each ride, passengers must validate their QR code or cards on orange validator machines inside the vehicle. Passengers can use any door to enter.

== Routes ==
Passengers can get from Zhuliany (Kyiv Airport) by trolleybus #9 to Central Railway Station and Palats Sportu (center of the city).

One of the most popular and useful routes for a tourist is bus #24 (24A at weekends and holidays) from Central Railway Station - Khreshchatyk Street - European Square - to Kyiv Pechersk Lavra. This route operates by air-conditioning buses.

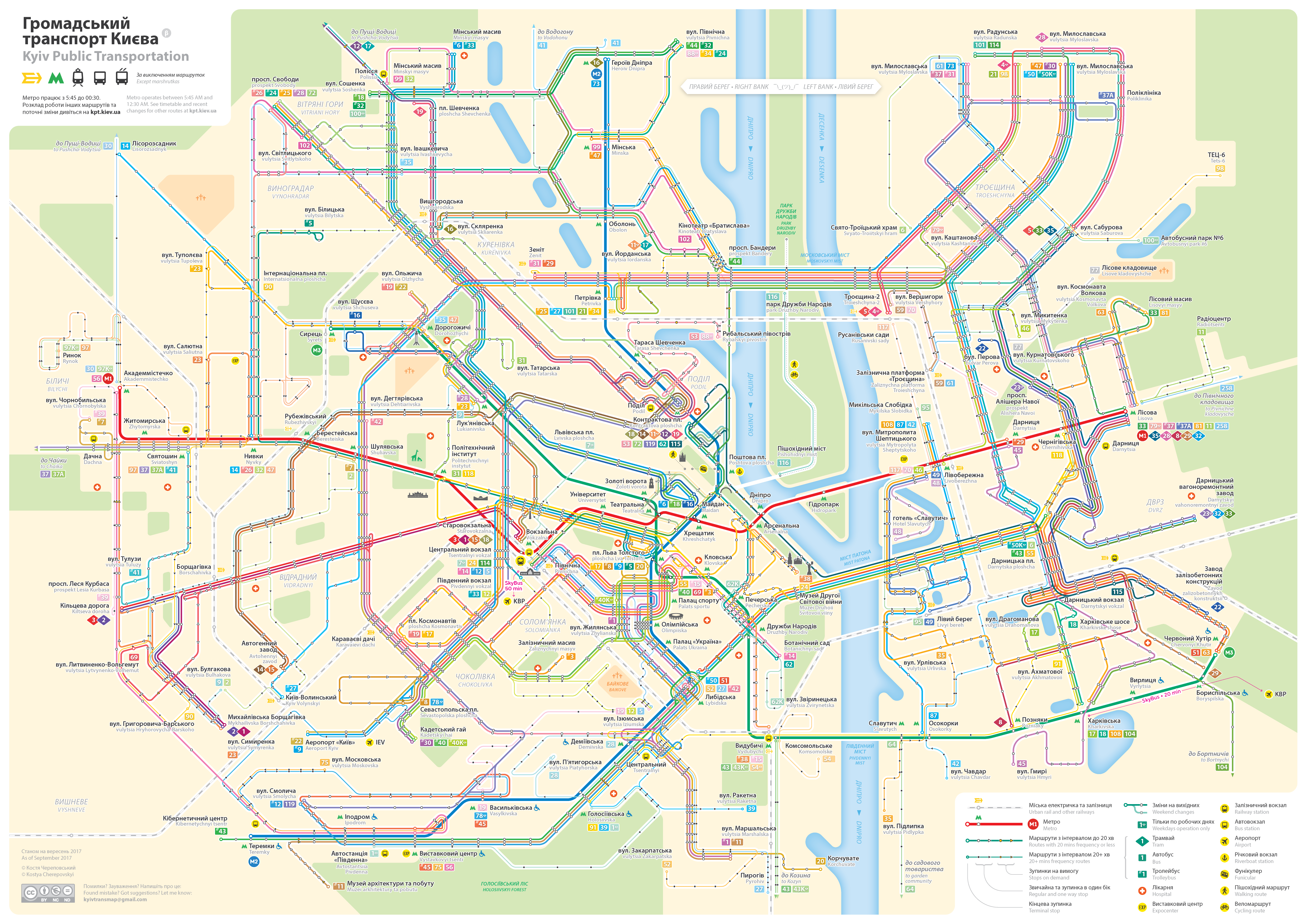
Routes operated by Kyivpastrans

Passengers can see online where their transport is on the official Kyivpastrans site.

The most popular routes operated by Kyivpastrans:
BusNo.	TrolleybusNo.	TramNo.
99	30	1
114	18	3
69	50	15

Kyiv also has night routes. All these routes are operated by Kyivpastrans only.

137N (bus) - Central Railway Station - Kharkivska Metro Street.

91N (trolleybus) - Central Railway Station - Myloslavska Street.

92N (trolleybus) - Zhuliany Airport - Central Railway Station - Svobody Avenue.

93N (trolleybus) - Lva Tolstoho Square Metro Station - Chornobylska Street.

94N (trolleybus) - Lva Tolstoho Square Metro Station - Lesya Kurbasa Avenue.
