= Podilskyi Bridge =

Podilskyi Bridge Crossing Подільський мостовий перехід
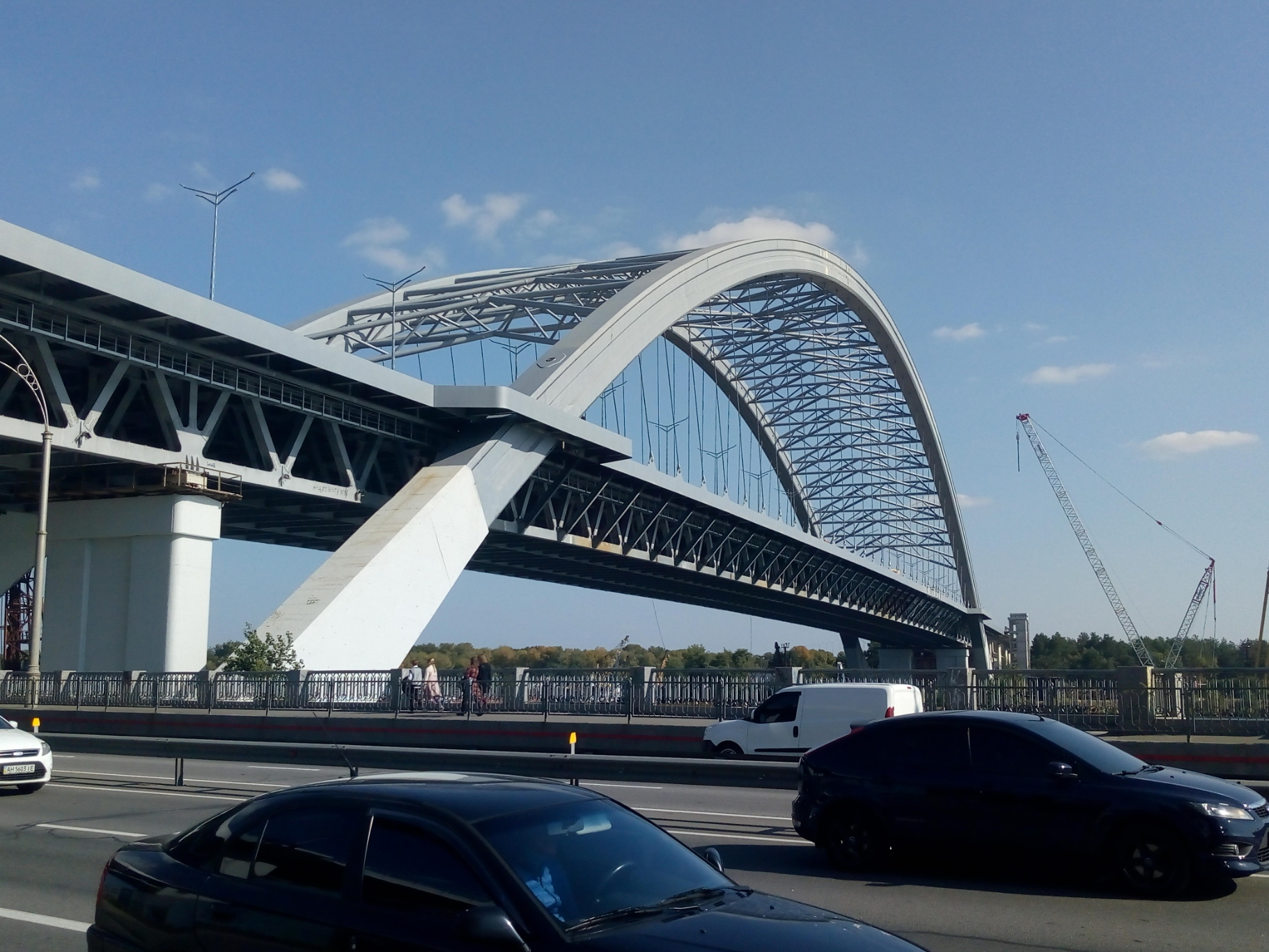
- Coordinates: 50°28′18″N 30°32′40″E
- Carries: Automobiles; Metro
- Crosses: Kyiv Harbor, Dnieper River, Desenka Strait
- Locale: Kyiv, Ukraine
- Official name: Podilskyi Bridge Crossing
- Other name: Podilsko-Voskresenskyi Bridge
- Owner: Ukraine
- Preceded by: Rybalskyi Railroad Bridge
- Followed by: Parkovyi Pedestrian Bridge

Characteristics
- Design: arch
- Material: Concrete, steel
- Total length: 4,432.2 metres (14,541 ft)
- Width: 39 m
- Height: 80 m
- Longest span: 344 metres (1,129 ft)

History
- Designer: Kyivsoiuzdorproekt
- Engineering design by: Heorhiy Fuks; Mykhailo Korniev; Vadym Zhezherin; Oleg Zavarzin
- Constructed by: Mostobud (2003–2014); Eurocon (2013–2014); EcoBudTrade (2017–present); Adamant (2017–2020); MZ-112 (2019–2022); Autostrada (2023–present)
- Construction start: 1993
- Opened: 1 December 2023 (1st stage)

Location
- Interactive map of Podilskyi Bridge Crossing

The Podilskyi Bridge Crossing (Ukrainian: Подільський мостовий перехід, romanized: Podilskyi mostovyi perekhid, IPA: [poˈd⁽ʲ⁾ilʲsʲkɪj mostoˈwɪj pereˈxid]), formerly known as Podilsko-Voskresenskyi Bridge (Подільсько-Воскресенський міст, Podilsko-Voskresenskyi mist), is a combined road-rail bridge over the Dnipro River under construction in Kyiv, Ukraine. It is a focal point of construction of the Podilsko-Vyhurivska line of the Kyiv Metro (the so-called 'Metro to Troieshchyna'). A part of the bridge was opened with restrictions on 1 December 2023, and a year later its connection to Troieshchyna was fully opened.

The two-level and 7 km (4 mi)-long bridge is intended to carry part of the future Podilsko-Vyhurivska Line of the Kyiv Metro and three lanes of road traffic in each direction, connecting the central Podil neighborhood to the left-bank parts of the city. The top level of the bridge will carry road traffic, while the bottom will carry rail traffic.

Construction is being carried out by the Kyiv City Council. The original contractor that was building the bridge since 2003 was Mostobud, but the work went slowly and stopped in 2014; before the halt, Eurocon assisted them in arch construction. After the 2017 contest, EcoBudTrade was chosen to finish the construction. To do the work they were hiring contractors like Adamant, MZ-112 and Autostrada.

== Location ==
The bridge is located midway between the existing Rybalskyi Railroad Bridge and the Parkovyi Pedestrian Bridge. The first entrance is planned to begin with intersection at Mezhyhirska and Naberezhno-Luhova Street, the second one from the right bank's Nyzhniy Val and Naberezhno-Khreshchatytska Street (current location of the closed Rybalskyi Bridge, that is planned to be dismantled). The third entrance is at Rybalskyi Peninsula from Naberezhno-Rybalska Street. At the left bank the bridge will be connected to Suleimana Stalskoho Street that leads to Voskresenskyi Avenue.

== Design ==
The bridge is intended to connect Podil on the right bank with Voskresenka and Raiduzhnyi Masyv on the left bank. Starting in Podil the bridge will cross the Rybalskyi Peninsula, the Dnieper River, Trukhaniv Island, and the Rusanivski Sady dacha community, terminating on the left bank. Due to protests against building the bridge over Raiduzhne Lake, the project of the bridge was modified so that the bridge will divide into two parts on the left bank: one going to the north and linking with Troieshchyna, and the other going south and linking with Voskresenka.

The bridge is actually a combination of several bridges, ramps, and other types of viaducts with a total length of 7.5 km (4.7 mi). It consists of several major components:

- three bridges over Kyiv Harbor
- a bridge over Dnieper River (main part)
- a bridge over Chortoryi Gulf
- viaducts over Trukhaniv Island and Horbachykha
- four multi-level road interchanges
- a connection to Romana Shukhevycha Avenue (Troieshchyna)
- a connection to Alishera Navoi Avenue and Voskresenskyi Avenue (Voskresenka)

The bridge roadway is intended to have three lanes each way with a projected traffic intensity of 59,000 vehicles per day. The bridge will also carry the Podilsko–Vyhurivska line containing three metro stations on the bridge: Sudnobudivna, Trukhaniv Ostriv, and Desenka Strait.

== History ==
A bridge from Podil to Voskresenka had been planned since the Soviet times and appeared in the Kyiv master plan for 1985–2005. The first construction project was approved in 1993, and the construction began that year with a plan of finishing it in 2001; however in 1995, it was suspended due to the difficult financial situation.

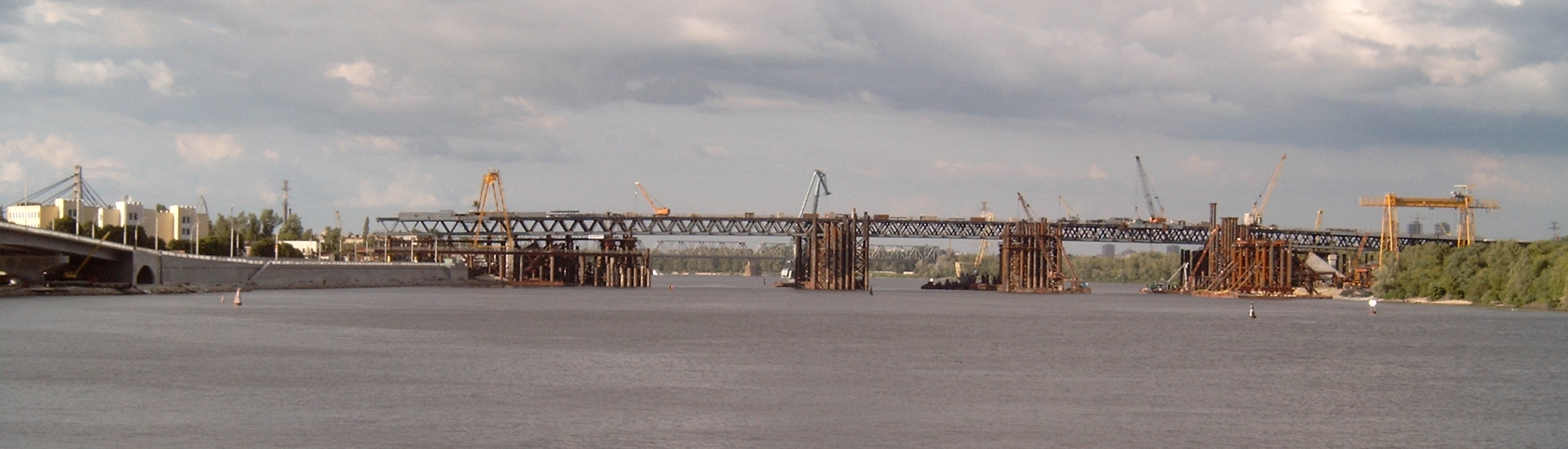
Early phase of construction, 2008

After some years of being abandoned, the bridge reappeared in the Kyiv master plan for 2005–2020, Mostobud was chosen to finish the construction. 28 December 2003, marked the renewal of land preparation at Trukhaniv Island, and the new project was accepted in 2004. This year also marked the connection of the bridge with the left bank. At the start of construction, the bridge was planned to be opened in 2007, but inadequate funding meant that the completion date was postponed to 2008. In 2007, the construction was expanded to Rybalskyi Peninsula, connecting it to the right bank. To start the construction, part of the Kuznia na Rybalskomu shipbuilding plant (Leninska Kuznia at the time) had to be demolished. In addition, residents of nearby dormitories had to be resettled; resettling was also planned for a number of private houses at Rusanivski Sady on the left bank. Meanwhile, the planned opening was once again postponed, this time to 2010.

In 2009, the assembly of an arch on the bridge from Rybalskyi to Trukhaniv started, alongside it the piers for a bridge from Podil were built. On the Rybalskyi Peninsula, the construction of the exit to the Naberezhno-Rybalska Street also began. There was a plan to build a skyscraper inside the interchange as a part of Kyiv City office center that had to be built on the shipbuilding plant location, but due to the financial situation the project was scrapped. The planned opening of the bridge was moved back to 2011.

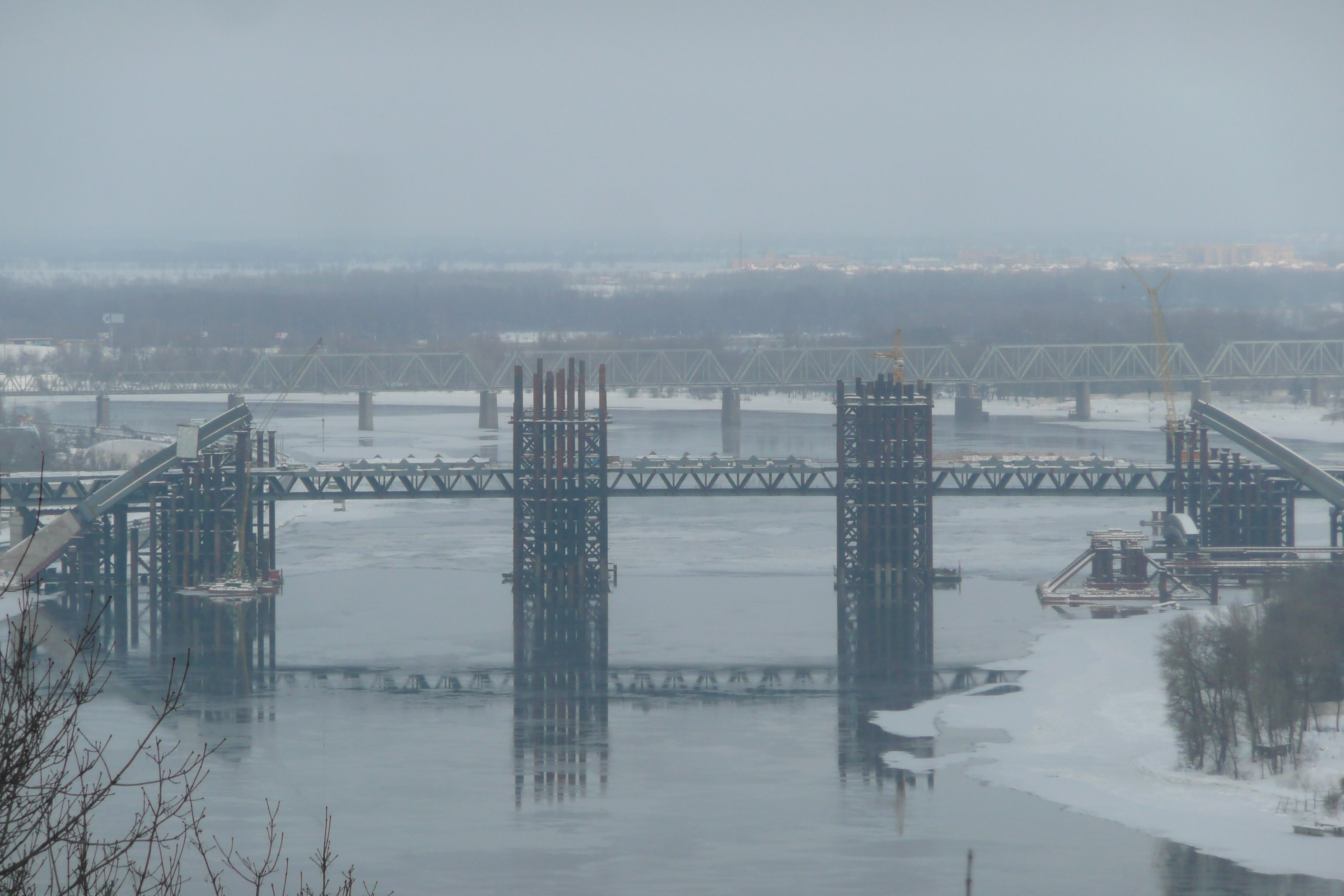
Bridge's arch assembly in 2010

From 2010 the majority of the work was carried out on the right bank, while on the left bank there was the problem of resettling Rusanivski Sady. Due to this, the completion of construction was delayed yet again, this time to 2014, and then to 2016. In February it was decided to buy and demolish the private houses that were blocking the construction process and resettle the owners to Bykivnia. Despite the resistance of the residents, the destruction began in October. In December 2011, legal issues with the private owners of the land were settled, and the construction process was finally expanded to Trukhaniv Island. In June 2012, the Kyiv River Port administration building was demolished due to the plan to build an entrance to the bridge from the Naberezhno-Khreshchatytska Street.

The work on an arch was planned to be finished in October 2012, but lack of funding caused the construction to slow down, so even in 2013, there was almost no progress. At the end of the year Swedish company, Eurocon joined Mostobud in the project to accelerate the construction. In February 2014 despite the ongoing Revolution of Dignity the process of arch's segment lifting had begun, it was finished by 4 March in a strong fog. 19 June the final segment of the arch was installed. After that, the construction was put on hold since there was not enough money to continue the construction.

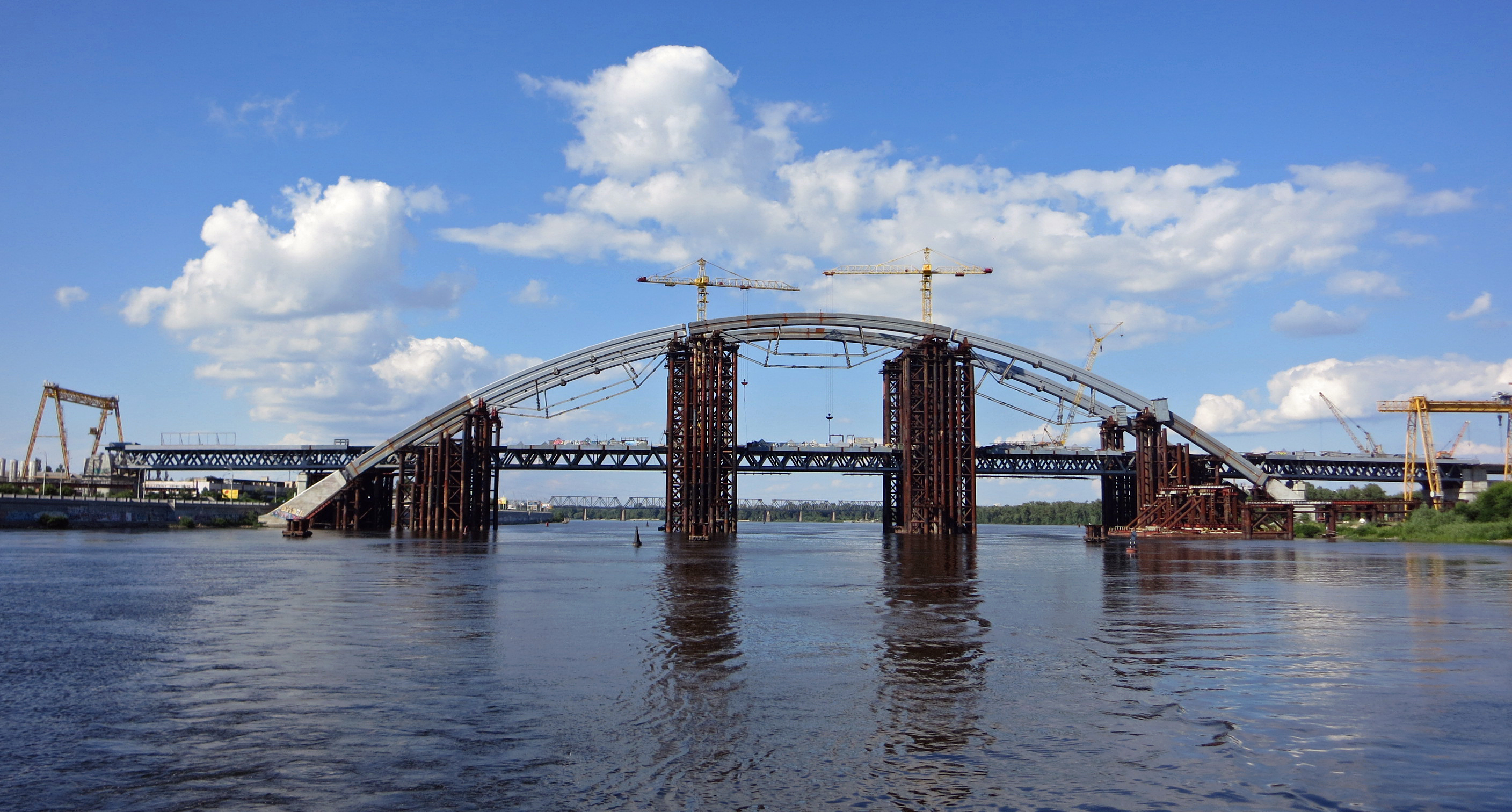
The bridge with a completed arch stands on temporary piers, 2014

Since the Autumn of 2016, it was planned to finish the construction in 2019 with investment from Germany. In December it was decided to change the temporary piers to full-time ones. In April 2017 two contests for finishing the bridge was held, one for a section from Podil to Rusanivski Sady and one for a part from Rusanivski Sady to Voskresenka. Both contests were won by EcoBudTrade. By results of technical inspection, held by German experts, the bridge was 50% ready. In August bridge construction was renewed. In 2018, construction accelerated, in July the arch connections began to be assembled, the first one was installed in August. During the inspection in October Mayor of Kyiv Vitali Klitschko stated that the bridge would be opened by the end of 2020.

In November 2018, the dormitory at Rybalskyi Peninsula that was in the way of future bridge was demolished. In January 2019, the construction at Rusanivski Sady began, where the bridge had to reach the railway. In March, the last arch connection was installed. In April, the preparation for Nyzhniy Val Street entrance construction had begun. On 29 April, the old Rybalskyi Bridge was closed for dismantling. In August, dismantling of the temporary piers had begun. In September, the preparation work for the entrance from Naberezhno-Khreshchatytska Street was renewed.

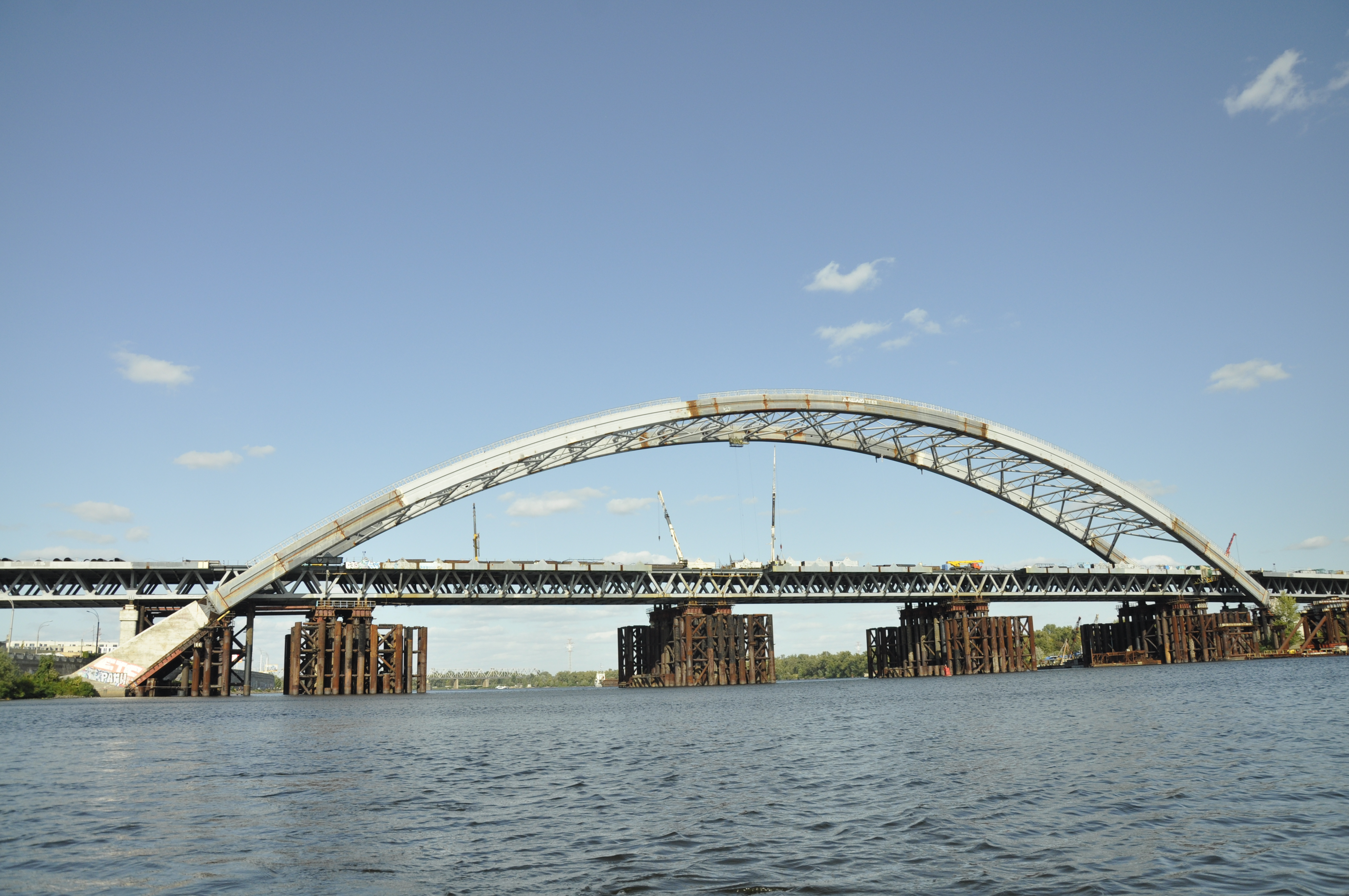
Bridge's temporary piers partially dismantled, 2019

In November 2019 installation of piers at Rusanivski Sady and Podil has begun, in December assembly of the bridge at the left bank and preparation for metro tunnel construction started. In January 2020 the assembly of the exit to Podil began using Mammoet equipment, also a part of Kuznia na Rybalskomu territory was cleared. 17 January the first batch of tension cables from Germany has arrived to construction site. In February a construction over the Rusanivske lake has begun, also the house demolition resumed to make a mound for the road and metro tunnel underneath it.

The Podil exit construction started 11 February. Later that month, a dismantling of a Podil exit of the Rybalskyi Bridge had started. In March, the piers were finished, and the span assembly began. Also, the assembly of the new heating route next to the bridge started in order to replace the one that used to be on the Rusanivskyi Bridge. In April the assembly of scaffoldings to sandblast the arch began by German company Plettac. During the 23 April inspection Klitschko announced that the asphalt would be laid on the bridge and the spans to Podil will be connected on 1 July.

In April during the preparation for asphalt laying the first noise barriers had been installed. In the end of the month cables of Rybalskyi bridge began to be cut.

On 1 February 2021, Klitschko stated that the bridge would be opened by the summer of 2021. Also in February 2021, Head of the Kyiv Urban Planning Council Vitali Selyk predicted that it would be possible to build the automobile part of the bridge no earlier than the end of the year, provided that the pace of construction would be comparable to that of the six months before the 2020 Kyiv local election, and if work began immediately.

In May 2023, Mayor Klitschko assured that the first part of the bridge will be opened in 2023. On 1 December 2023, Klitschko announced that the finished section of the bridge was partially opened, only allowing special transport, emergency service vehicles, military, and one new bus route to pass through. Since the section from the Rusanivski Sady dam to the railway was not finished yet and there was no connection of the bridge with the main transport arteries of the Left Bank, the operational potential of the bridge was extremely limited in its state.

On 1 December 2024, the connection to Romana Shukhevycha Avenue, which links the bridge with Troieshchyna, was opened. However, some of the planned work around the area is yet to be completed.

On 23 August 2025 traffic was fully opened in all lanes in both directions.

== Controversies ==
=== Eco activism against the construction ===
The original project of the bridge included its connection to Voskresenskyi Avenue on the left bank, there had been an attempt to start the construction but it had been interrupted by the protesters. The eco activists were stating that the construction will harm the Raiduzhne Lake over which the bridge should go through to reach the Suleimana Stalskoho Street. In February 2019, transport engineer Viktor Petruk designed an alternative project of the bridge with a junction right before Raiduzhne which leads to Alishera Navoi Avenue. In September residents of Rusanivski Sady asked Kyiv City Council to cancel the construction through the Horbachykha reserve at the bank of Chortoryi Gulf and pay them a compensation for demolishing their houses. Currently, it is planned to connect the bridge to both Shukhevycha Avenue and Voskresenskyi Avenue. According to the current plan, the bridge will not pass through Raiduzhne Lake, instead connecting with Voskresenskyi Avenue through Alishera Navoi Avenue. But the connection to Shukhevycha Avenue to the north is impossible to finish without the construction going through the new square garden at Vershyhory Street that was opened already during Raiduzhne Lake debate; so, the ecology would be harmed in both cases.

=== Residential complex at Kyiv River Port ===
In July 2019, SAGA Development introduced the Novyi Podil residential complex. To build it, they had planned to demolish Kyiv River Port. The main problem was that the project was located right on the way of not yet built main bridge entrance. Despite that fact, the construction was allowed by Kyiv City State Administration 22 January 2020. According to Nashi Hroshi newspaper, SAGA exploited the loophole of constructing the residential complexes on the land for public buildings calling them multifunctional complexes. The owner of SAGA Development Andriy Vavrysh made a response on Facebook stating that according to the newest construction standards, the land is allocated for the multifunctional construction, but Nashi Hroshi refuted his words by providing documents in which the land allocation hadn't been changed yet. The construction of the complex had started in 2021 being in conflict with a construction of the bridge.

== Accidents ==
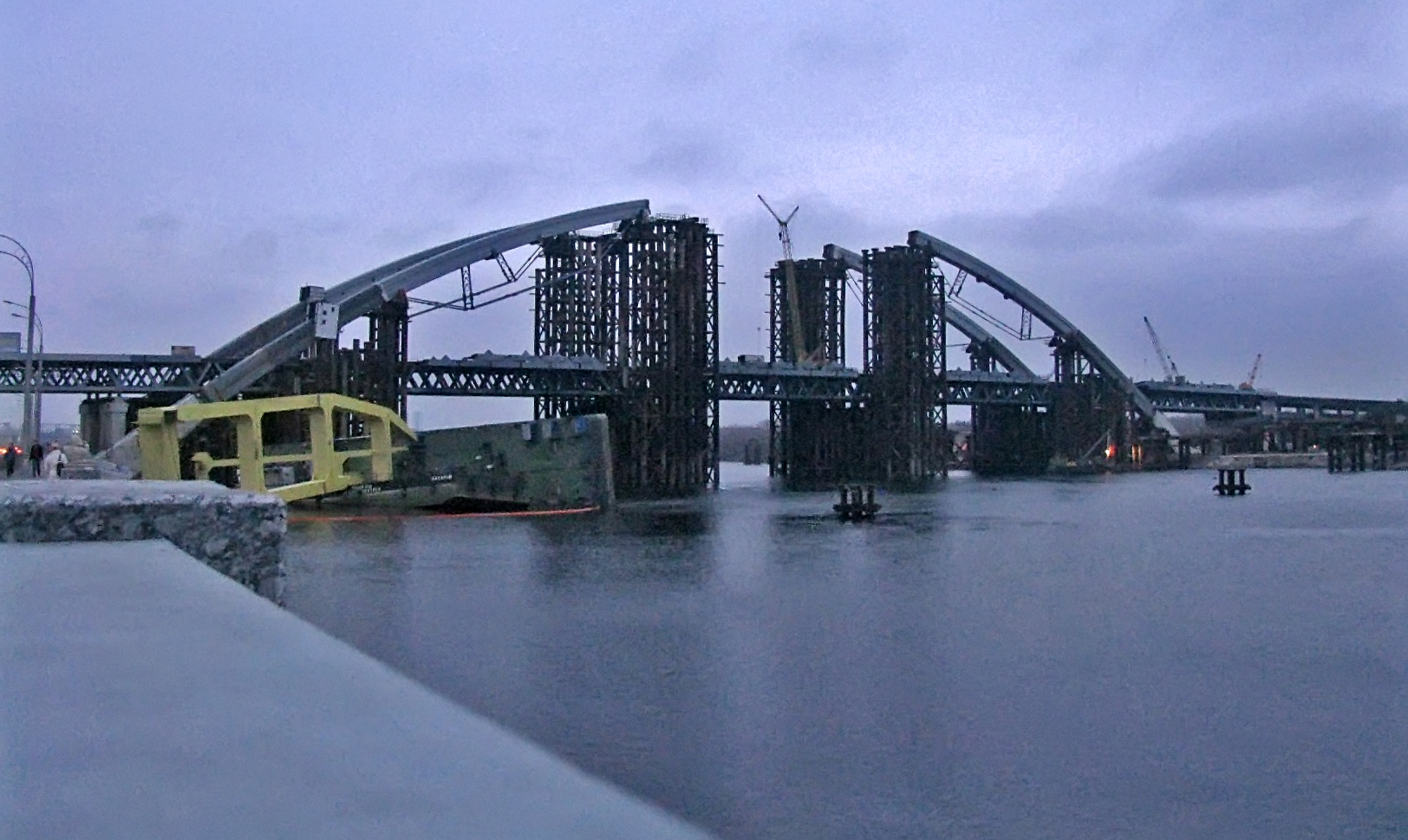
Accident with the crane Zakhariy

On 18 November 2011, a crane vessel LK-600 Zakhariy that was being used in the construction fell into the river and broke apart. The accident damaged the crane and polluted the Dnieper's waters with crane oil and construction materials. During the accident, two other barges were damaged; the Havanskyi Bridge received light damage.

Several accidents involving people falling off the bridge while exploring the incomplete construction work happened when construction was abandoned in 2014–2017.

On 14 September 2016, part of the bridge at Rybalskyi Peninsula caught fire due to a short circuit.

16 April 2020 during the dust storm scaffoldings installed by German company Plettac for arch sandblasting fell down into the river. The bridge structures didn't receive any damage and none of the workers got injured.

== In popular culture ==
In 2017, French rapper Orelsan produced a video-clip on this bridge for his song "Basique".

Some scenes from the Diesel brand "Go with the Flow" campaign were filmed on this bridge.

In 2019, Chinese boy band WayV released a music video for the song "Take Off" among the locations in the video, you can see this Bridge.

The music video for Rosalía's "Saoko", which premiered in 2022, was mainly filmed on this bridge.

== Gallery ==
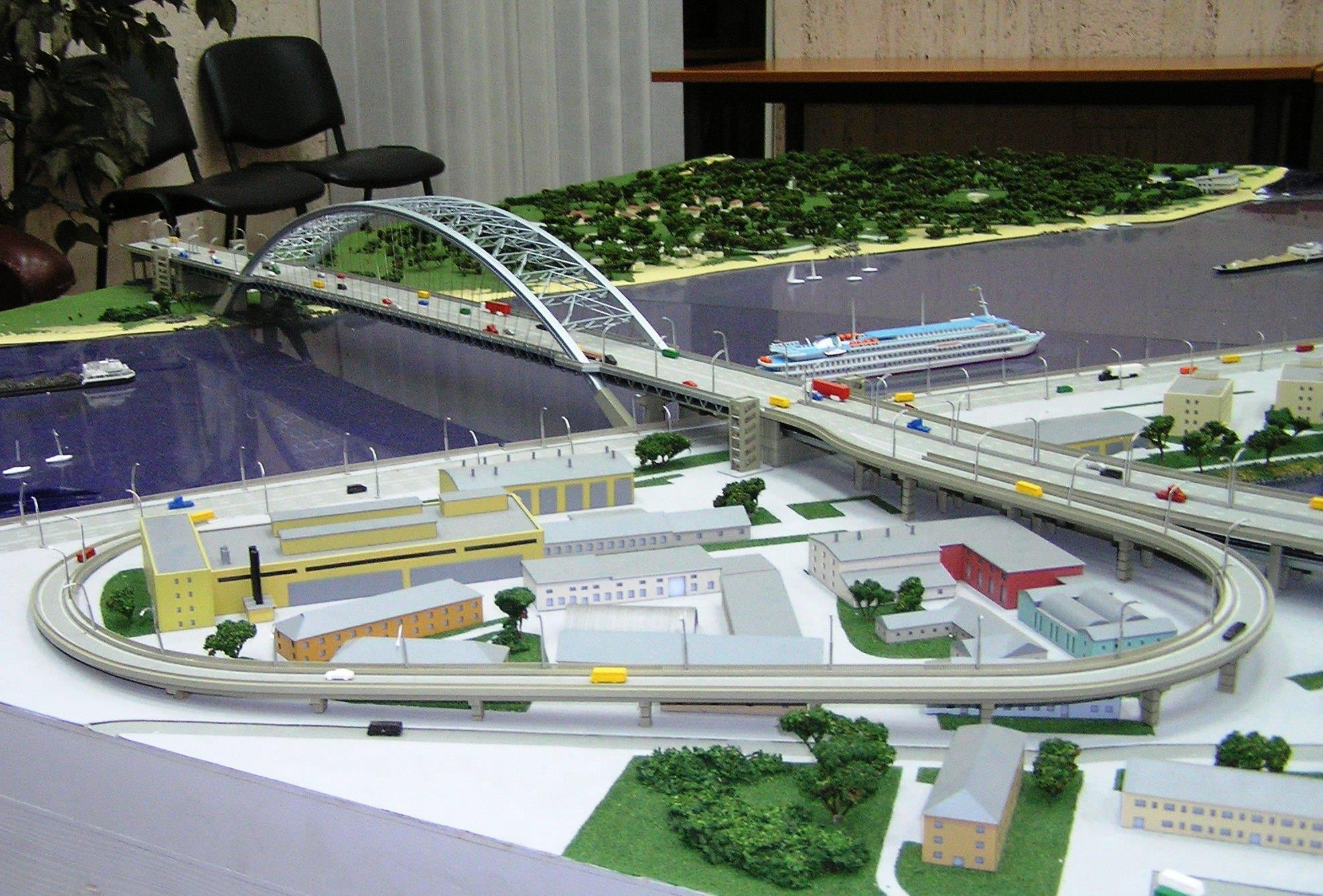
Model of the bridge's main span and car ramp

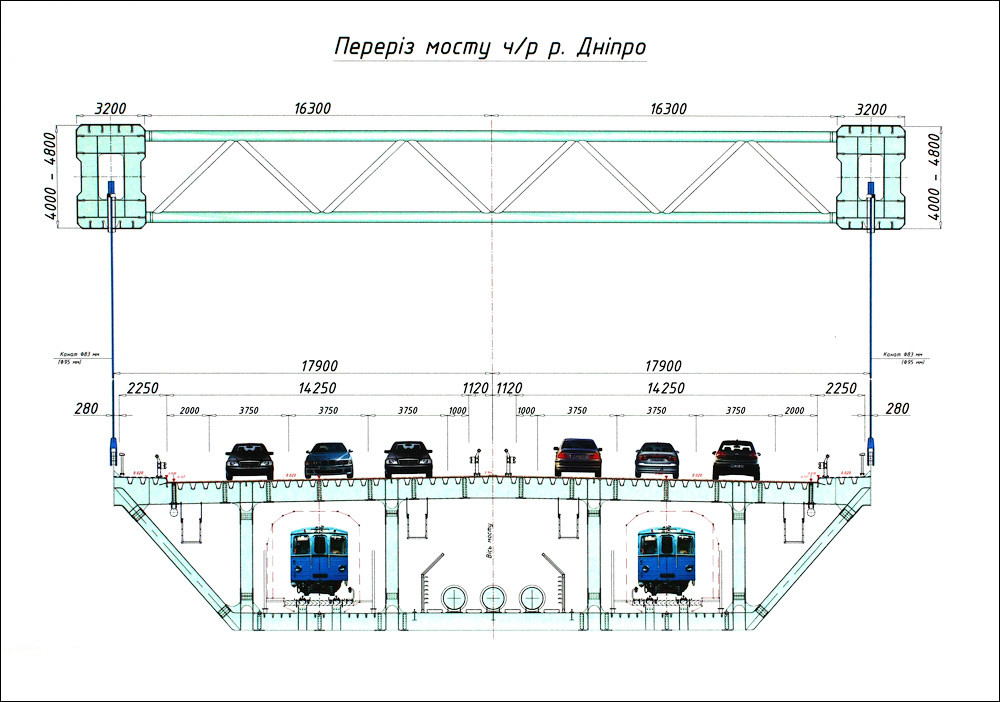
Bridge arch profile

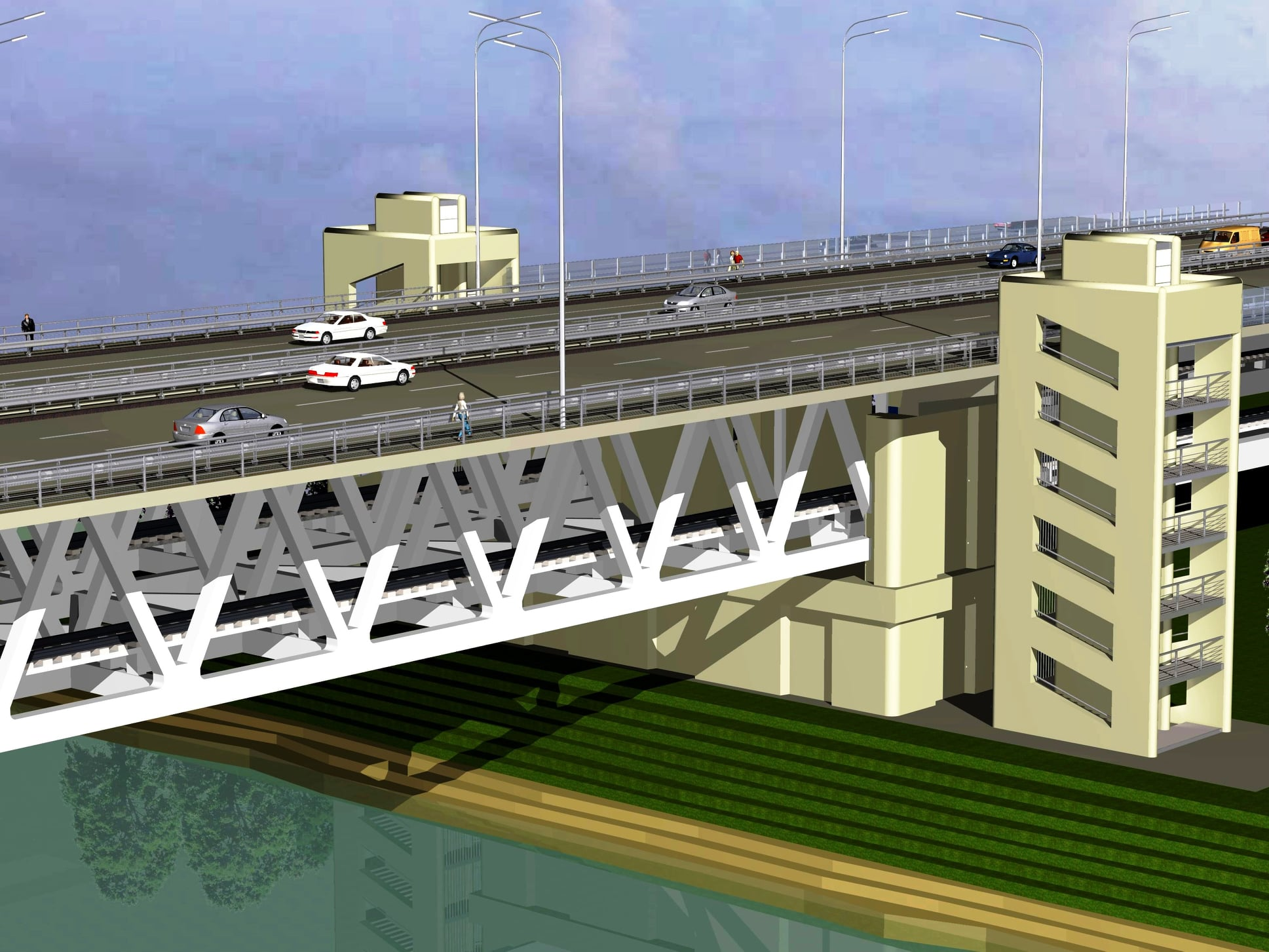
View on bridge model across Desenka Strait

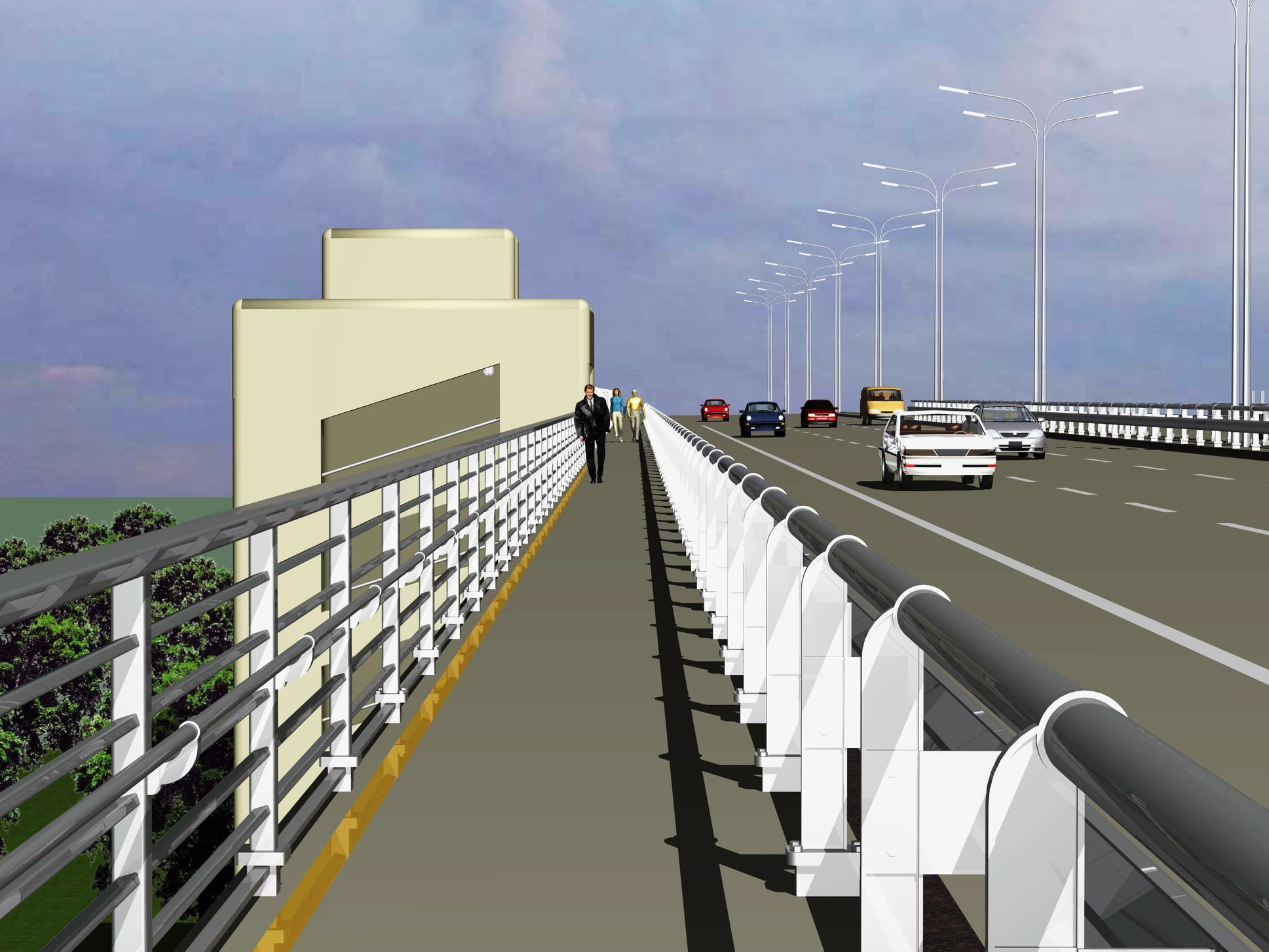
Handrail and car barrier design

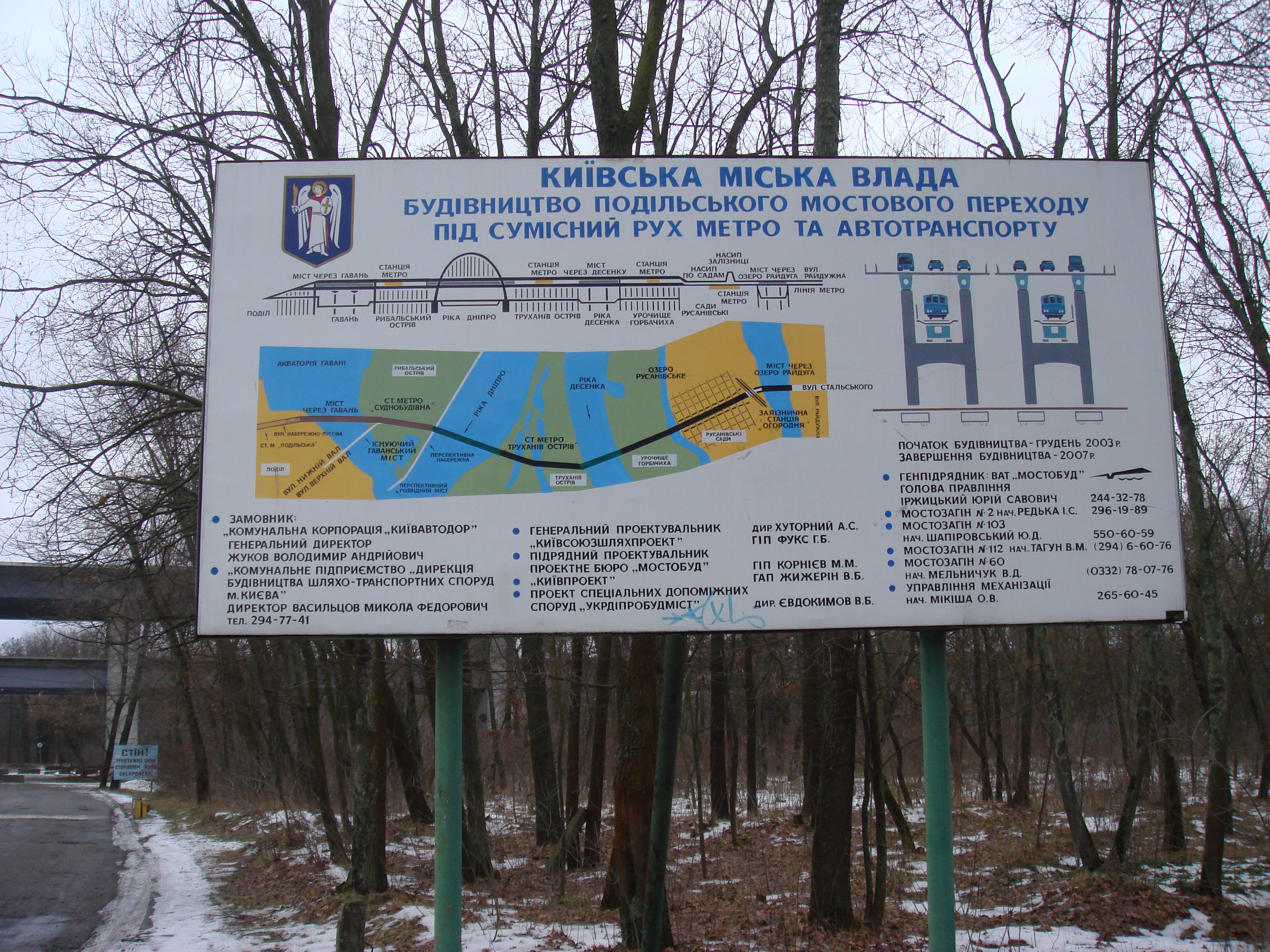
Construction information board at Trukhaniv Island in 2009, showcasing the old plan of the bridge

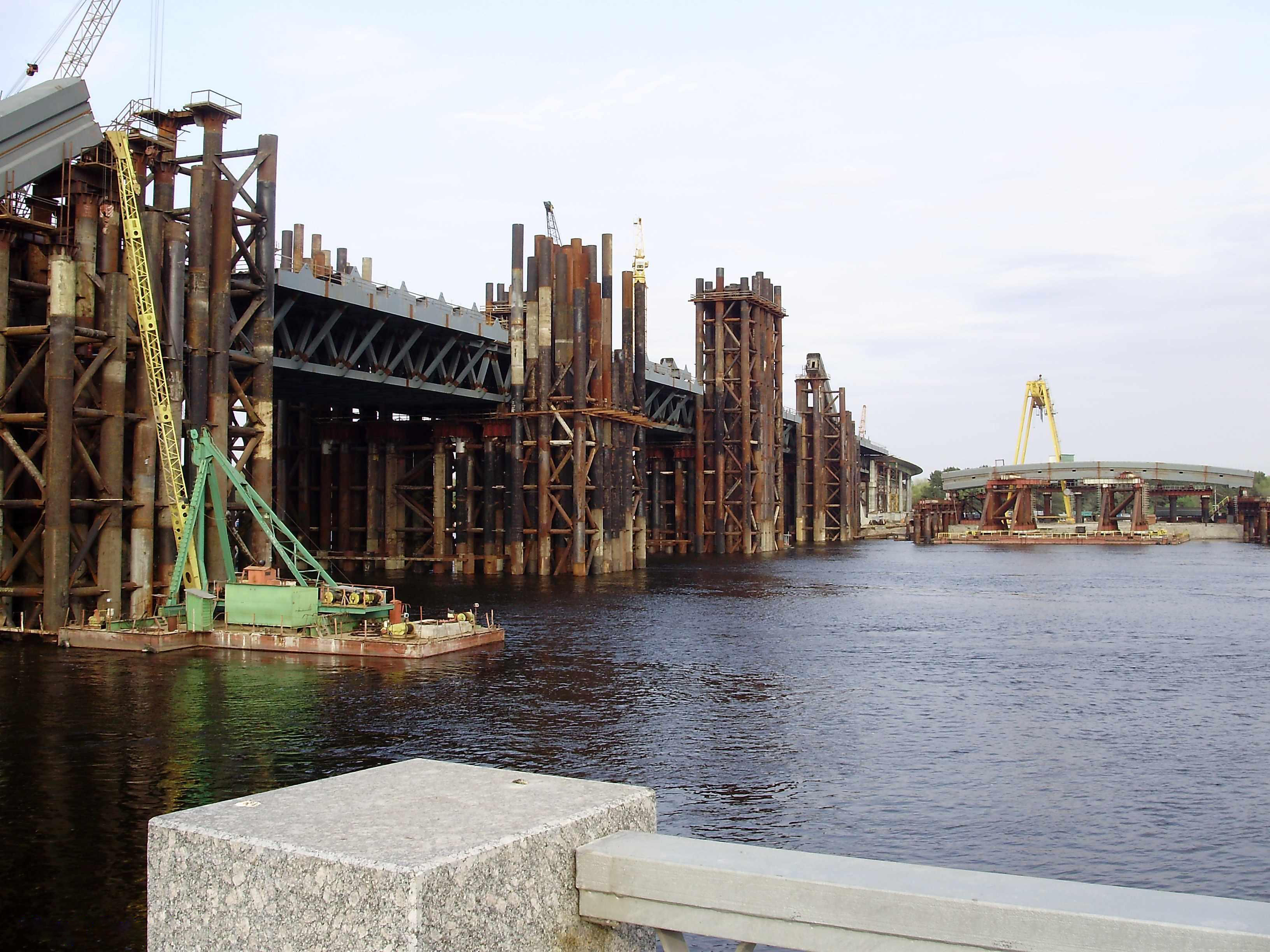
Construction site as of 2009, pictured from the Rybalskyi Peninsula

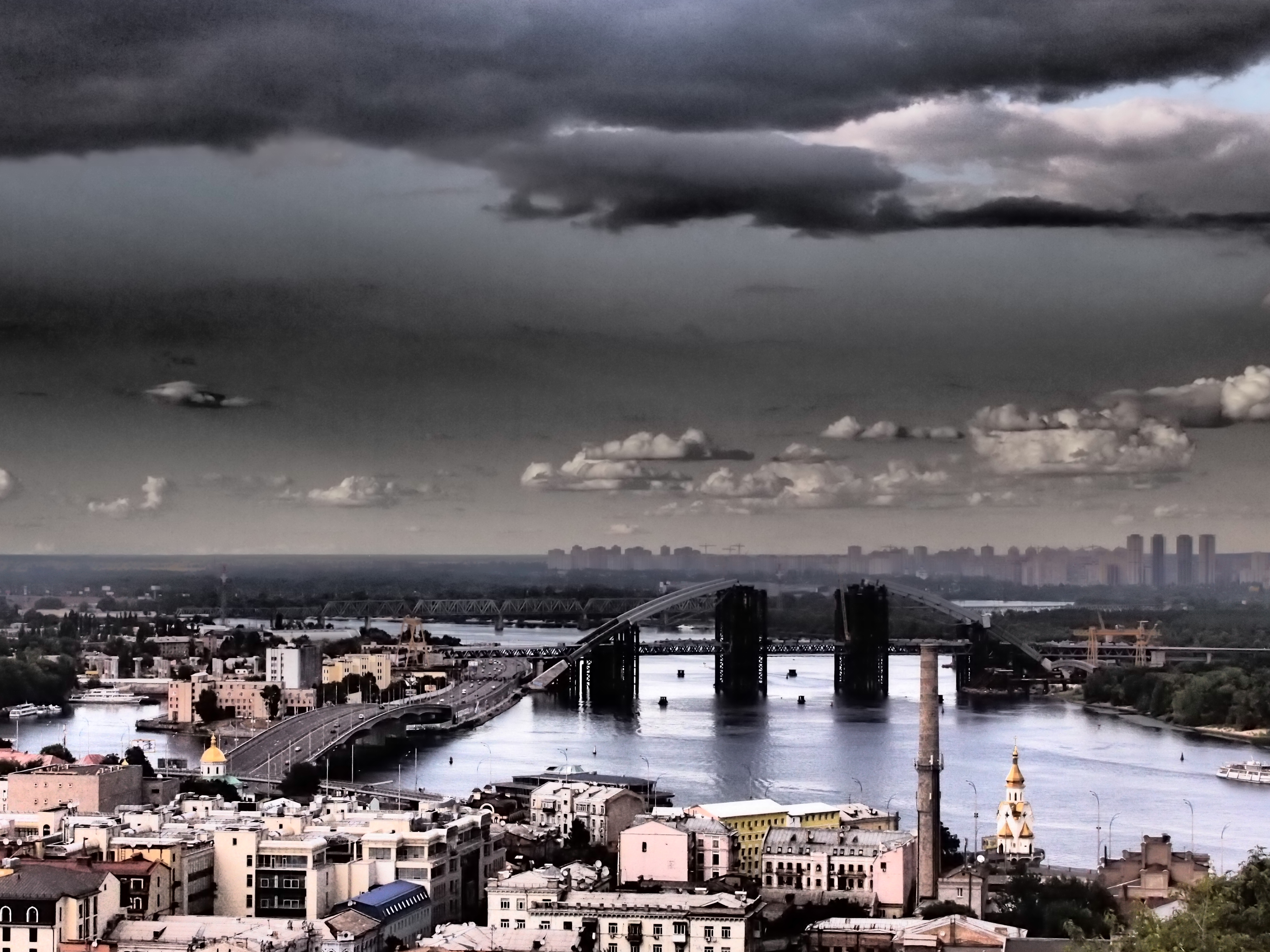
Panorama view of the bridge in 2012, pictured from the Arch of Freedom of the Ukrainian People

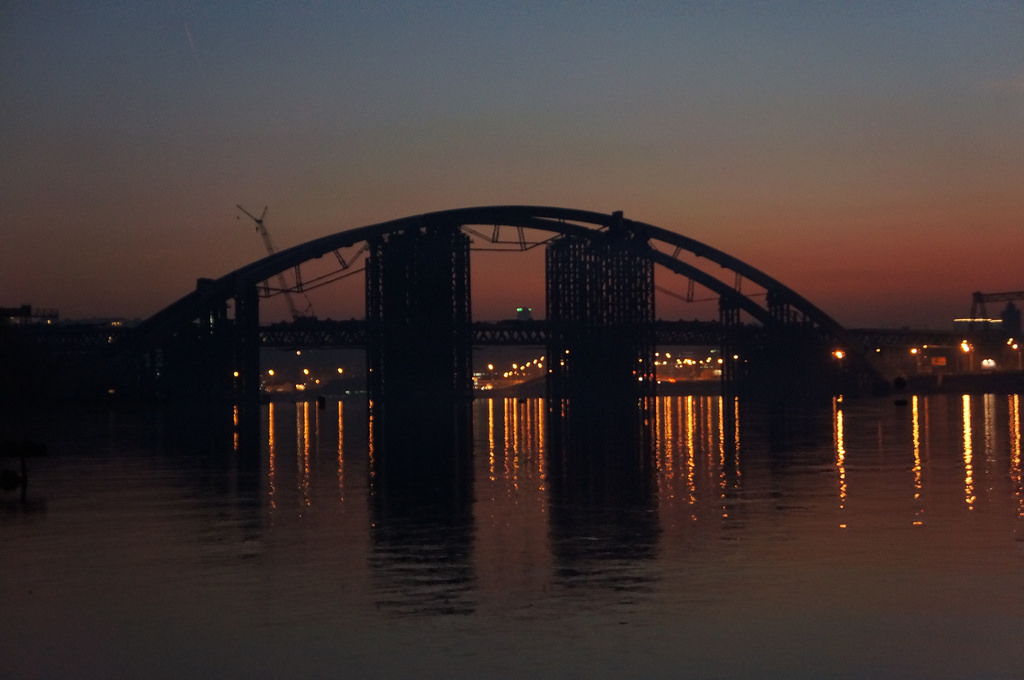
The bridge in 2015

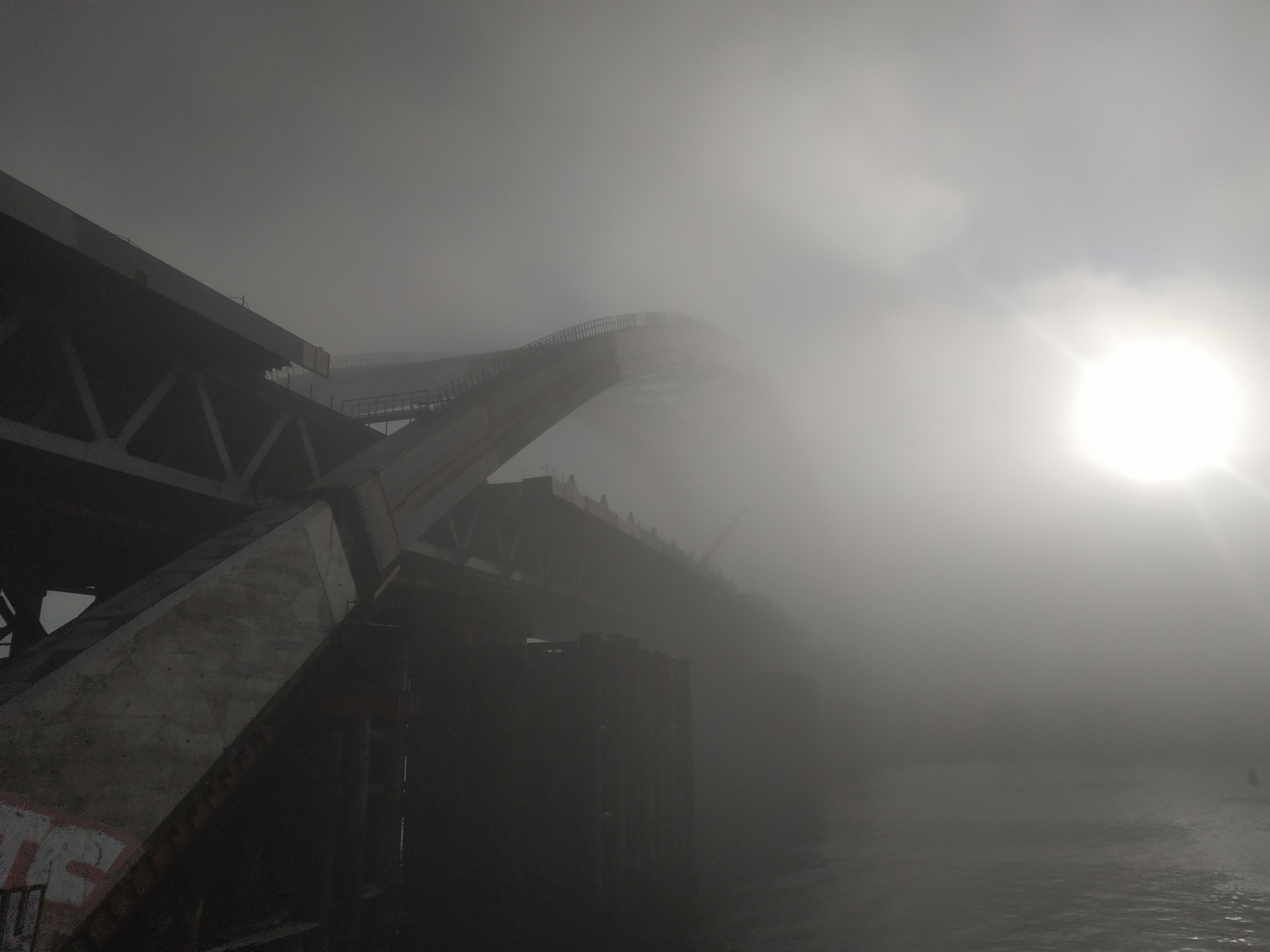
The bridge in October 2019

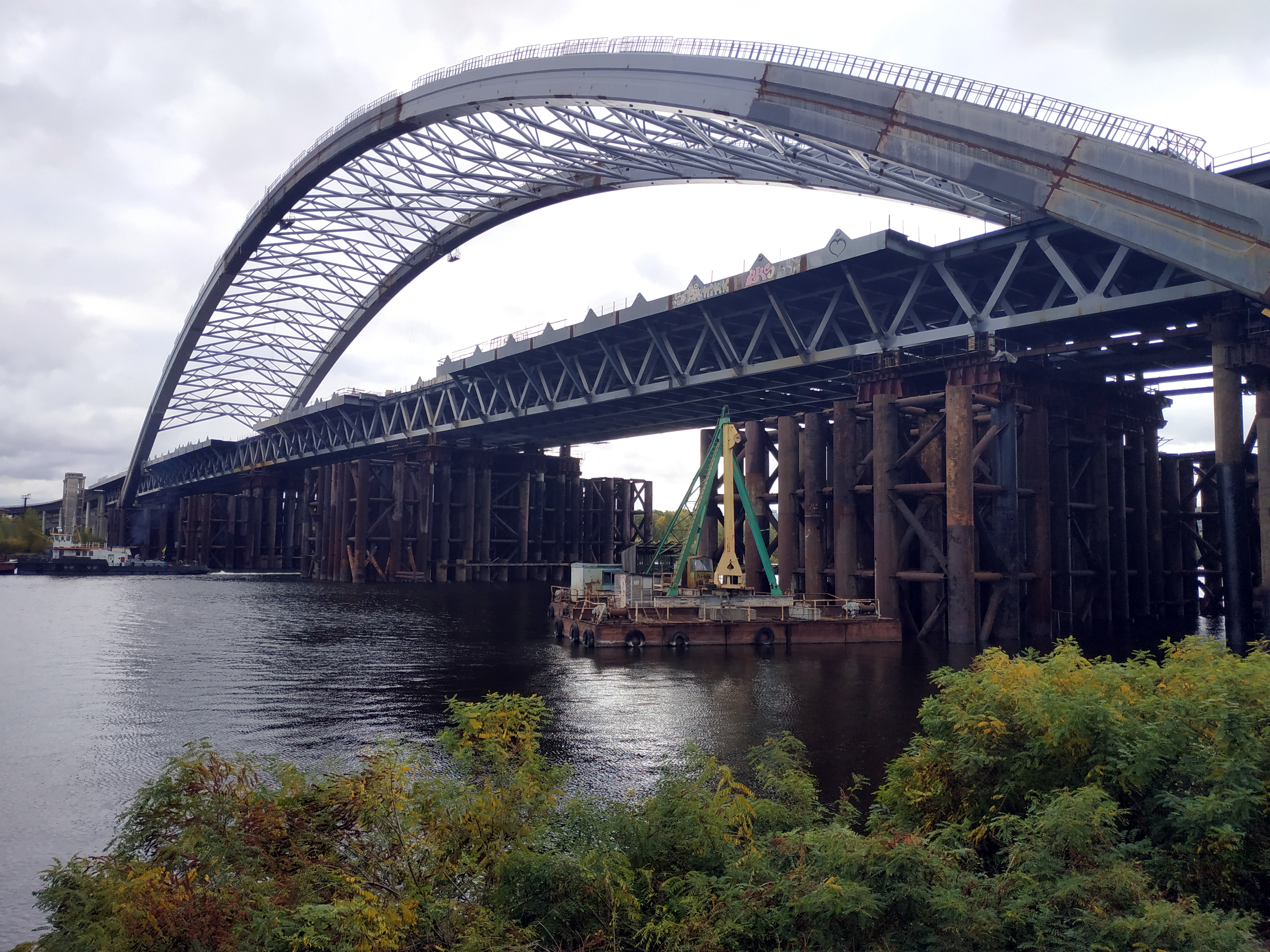
Pontoon near the bridge in 2019

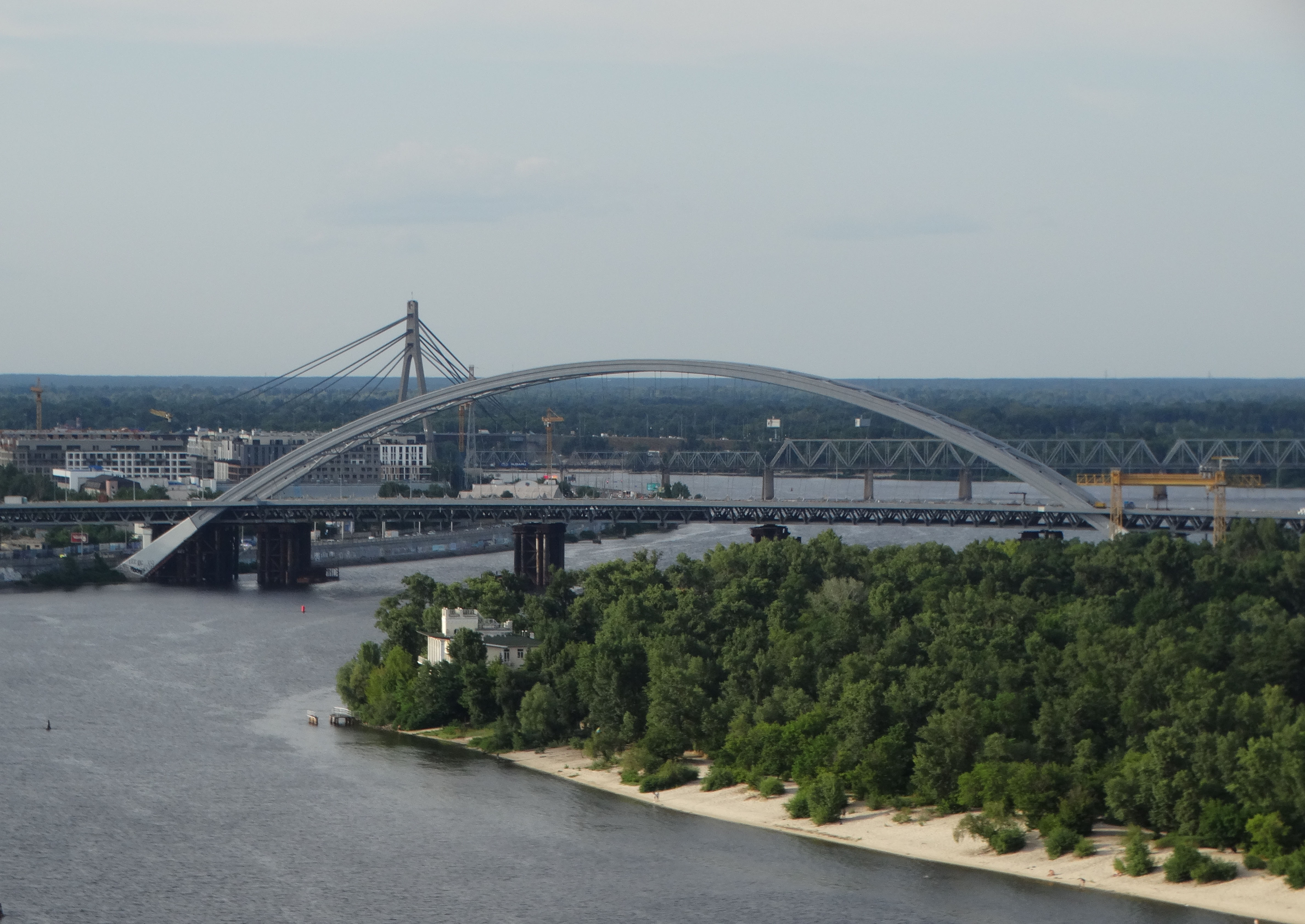
The bridge in October 2021

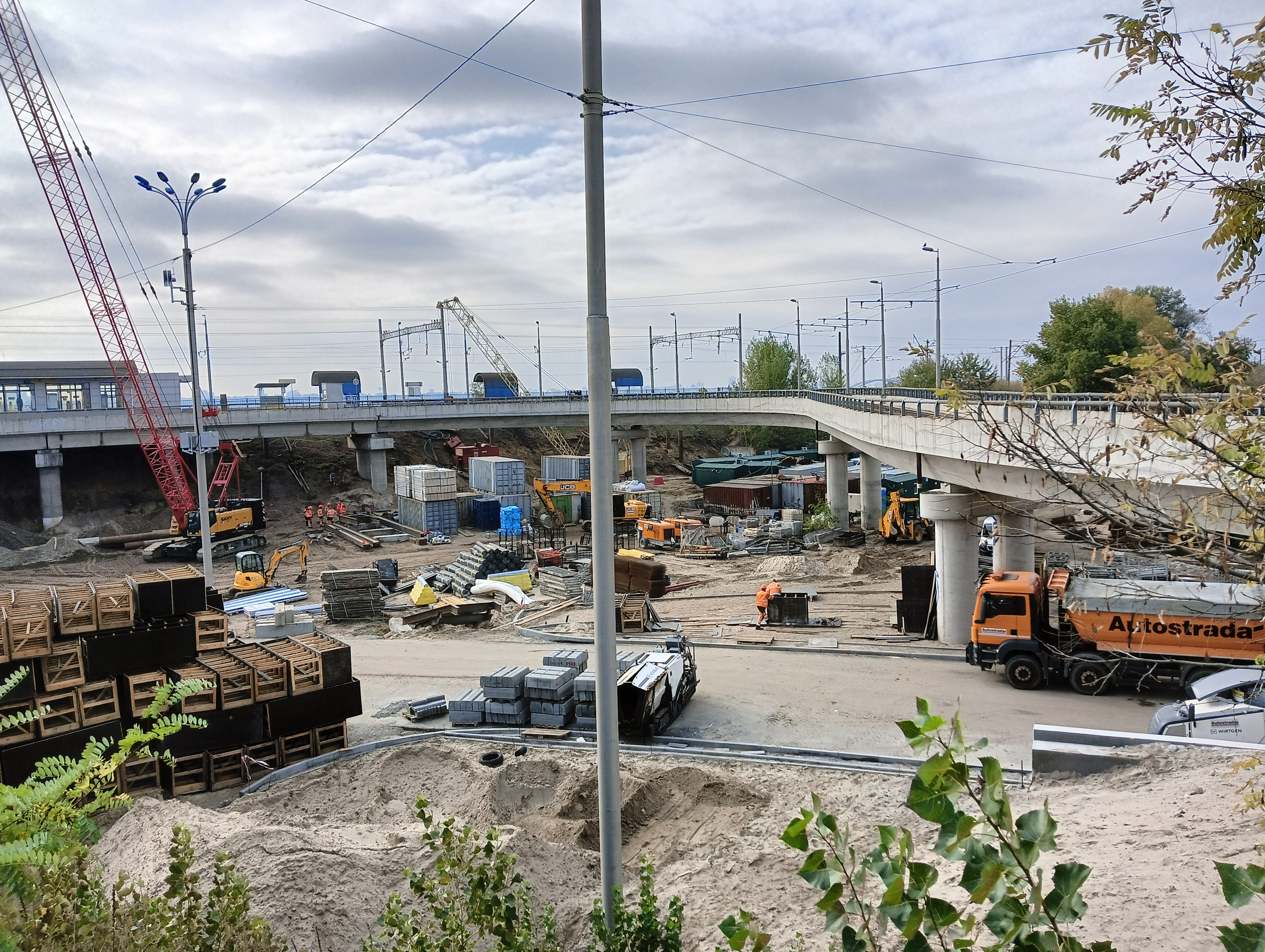
Construction of an approach to the bridge under Raiduzhnyi light rail station in 2024

== See also ==
- Bridges in Kyiv
- Kyiv River Port
