= Sudnobudivna (Kyiv Metro) =

Metro station in Kyiv, Ukraine

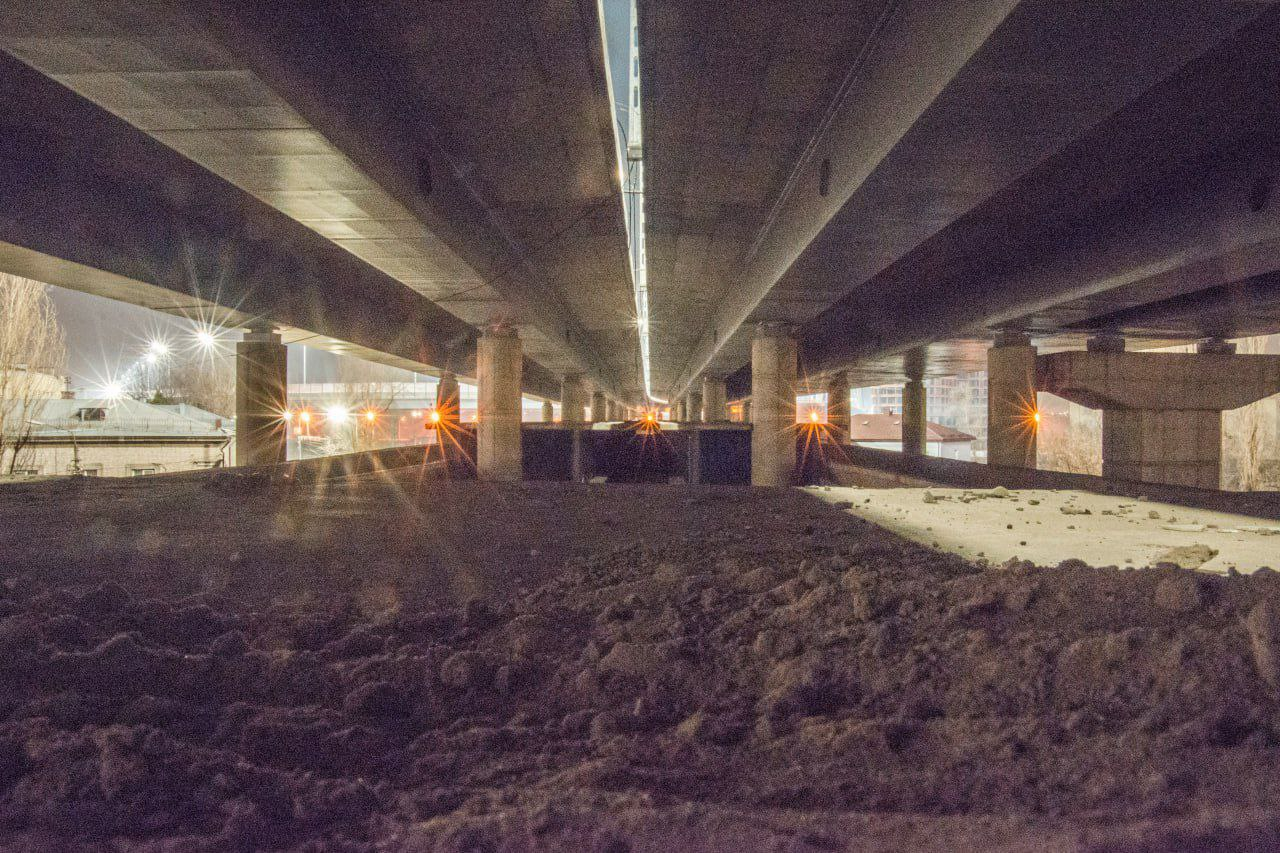
- View of the future station's platform hall, located underneath the Podilskyi Metro Bridge.

General information
- Coordinates: 50°28′27″N 30°31′39″E
- System: Kyiv Metro station
- Owner: Kyiv Metro
- Line: Podilsko–Vyhurivska line

Construction
- Structure type: Bridge

History
- Opened: Under construction

Services
Preceding station	Kyiv Metro	Following station
Podilska towards Hlybochytska	Podilsko–Vyhurivska line	Trukhaniv Ostriv towards Raiduzhna
Location

Sudnobudivna (Ukrainian: Суднобудівна) (proposed, Havan'; Ukrainian: Гавань) is a station currently under construction on the Kyiv Metro's Podilsko–Vyhurivska line. The station is part of the first segment of the Podilsko-Vyhurivska Line, which is scheduled to be completed after 2022.

== History ==
The station is located on the Rybalskyi Peninsula in the Podil district of Kyiv. The station is named after the Kuznia na Rybalskomu ship building company which is located in the vicinity. It is being built concurrently with the Podilskyi Metro Bridge, under which it is located. It will be located in between the Podilska and Trukhaniv Ostriv stations, the latter of which will be built according to the same architectural principles as the Sudnobudivna station.

The station will be enclosed with transparent glass on the outside, to protect passengers from the weathers elements. On either end of the station, there will be exits that connect to the station vestibules, with a parking lot for the station's workers included nearby. The stations entire length will be 132 m (433 ft), while its platform will have a width of 13.5 m (44 ft).
