= Trukhaniv Ostriv (Kyiv Metro) =

Railway station in Kyiv, Ukraine

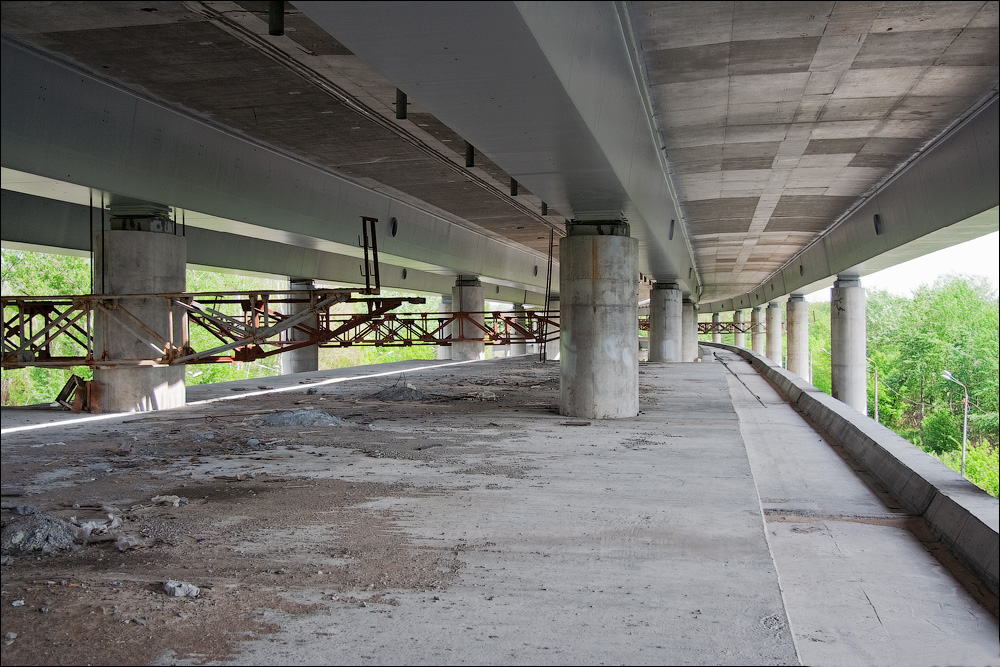
- View of the future station's platform hall, located underneath the Podilskyi Metro Bridge.

General information
- Coordinates: 50°28′16″N 30°32′40″E
- System: Kyiv Metro station
- Owner: Kyiv Metro
- Line: Podilsko–Vyhurivska line

Construction
- Structure type: Bridge

History
- Opened: Under construction

Services
Preceding station	Kyiv Metro	Following station
Sudnobudivna towards Hlybochytska	Podilsko–Vyhurivska line	Zatoka Desenka towards Raiduzhna
Location

Trukhaniv Ostriv (Ukrainian: Труханів острів, lit. 'Trukhaniv Island') is a station currently under construction on the Kyiv Metro's Podilsko–Vyhurivska line. The station is part of the first segment of the Podilsko-Vyhurivska Line, which is scheduled to be completed after 2022. Construction works at the station are suspended as of June 2020. An opening date of no earlier than 2025 has been set.

== History ==
The station is located on the northern part of the Trukhaniv Ostriv (for which it is named), an island on the Dnipro River. It is being built concurrently with the Podilskyi Metro Bridge, under which it is located. It will be located in between the Sudnobudivna and Zatoka Desenka stations, all three of which will be built according to the same architectural principles.

The station will be enclosed with transparent glass on the outside, to protect passengers from the weathers elements. On the exterior, the station will have only one station vestibule, with a parking lot for the station's workers included. The stations entire length will be 132 m (433 ft), while its platform will have a width of 13.5 m (44 ft).
