= Horbachykha =

Floodplain tract within Kyiv, Ukraine

Horbachykha tract
- Interactive map of Horbachykha tract
- Location: Dniprovskyi District, Kyiv, Ukraine
- Coordinates: 50°28′32″N 30°33′43″E

Horbachykha is a tract within the city of Kyiv (Dniprovskyi District), on the left bank of the Dnieper river, which is washed by the Chortoryi Strait, just downstream of the Rybalskyi Railway Bridge. Its territory is reserved for the creation of a 82.8-hectare protected area. Horbachykha is the last and the only remnant of floodplain forests of the left bank of the Dnieper river within Kyiv, the rest of the floodplain forests in the area have been completely destroyed.

The name of the tract stems most likely from the name of the Horbachiv strait, which flows between the Dolobetskyi island and Horbachykha.

== History ==
In the 19th century Horbachykha tract had the appearance of a low sandy hill, which stretched from the village of Vyhurivshchyna until Rusanivska Bay. This hill was considered as one of Kyiv's Bald Mountains, according to the guide by Boguslavsky (1812).

According to the cartographic data of the 19th century, around 1855 Horbachykha used to be an island separated from the shore by the Desenka Strait. But already in 1871–1873 Horbachykha becomes a tract turning into an island only during the spring floods. The tract is separated from the mainland left bank of the Dnieper River by a relic bay (present-day Lake Rusanivske). At that time, the tract was used by locals for agricultural purposes.

After the Second World War, the concept of park use of the Dnieper islands and floodplains was adopted. The lands to the east of Lake Rusanivske were assigned to the Rusaniv collective gardens, while Horbachykha tract, fenced off from the gardens by a protective dam, remained undeveloped. Thus floodplain meadows and floodplain willow-sedge forest, low willow thickets and xerophytic meadows got preserved in the tract.

The construction of the Kyiv and Kaniv Hydroelectric Power Plants led to a slowdown in the flow of the Dnieper River, and thus to a fact that the boundaries of the Dnieper islands and tracts became more fixed. Until the 1990s, the only evidence of human activity on the territory of Horbachykha was a post-war road made of concrete slabs, similar to the one on the Trukhaniv Island. In 1993 the construction of the Podilsk bridge crossing was initiated; the bridge was to connect the right and the left banks of the Dnieper River.

In 1994 the Kyiv City Council adopted a decision to put the tract on the list of valuable natural areas and objects reserved to become natural reserves. This decision was confirmed by the General Plan of Kyiv until 2020 and by the Program of integrated use of the green areas of Kyiv until 2010. However, in 2007 the Kyiv City Council adopted a decision to let Horbachykha tract for development; this decision was later overturned by the District Administrative Court.

== Nature and wildlife ==
Horbachykha tract combines all types of floodplain landscapes with their characteristic plant communities. The remains of relic riverine sand dunes, covered with typical psammophytic (thriving in sandy conditions) vegetation, have been preserved in the south-eastern part of the tract. Festuca beckeri, wood small-reed and blue hair grass grow in this area. There are also xerophytic (dry) meadows, where red sorrel, blue eryngo, Dianthus borbasii, common evening-primrose, Dnieper wormwood, common wood sorrel, goldmoss stonecrop, tasteless stonecrop, yellow bedstraw, northern bedstraw, yellow rattle and others grow. Some rare plants can be found, such as Tragopogon ucrainicus that is included in the European Red List. The slopes of the ridges are covered with sharp-leaf willow, wild rye (Secale sylvestre) and Carex colchica.

Most of the tract is occupied by floodplain forests and meadows. According to the old maps, the territory of the tract used to be covered solely by the floodplain meadows. However, after the Dnieper river flow became regulated and the spring floods ceased, forests began to develop, consisting mainly of black poplar and white willow. A relic fern adder's-tongue grows in the floodplain forests.

The shores of the tract, its bays and lakes are also characterized by rich vegetation. Yellow water-lily, white water lily, water chestnut (Trapa natans) and floating fern are common (the last two species are listed in the Red Book of Ukraine).

The fauna of Horbachykha includes the beaver, which is listed in Annex II of the Bern Convention, and the otter, which is listed in the Red Book of Ukraine. There are small populations of the American mink, the European polecat, the northern white-breasted hedgehog and the mole. Several species of bats listed in the Red Book of Ukraine nest in the old trees. Among the birds, grey and white heron can be found, especially in the Lake Chaplyne. Numerous species of migratory birds make a stopover at Horbachykha during the autumn migration, in particular the Eurasian oystercatcher, the little tern, the common tern, the little gull and a number of waders. Bunting, leaf warbler, typical warbler, Acrocephalus warbler, true thrush, tit, Eurasian penduline tit, brown owl, Eurasian golden oriole, lesser spotted woodpecker, grey-headed woodpecker, Eurasian wryneck, and nightingale breed in the floodplain forests. Amphibians and reptiles are represented by the European pond turtle, the sand lizard, the European tree frog, the moor frog, the garlic toad, as well as the grass snake and the marsh frog. In the adjacent water area there are so-called wintering pits, in which fish gather together in winter, in particular squalius, asp, ballerus, as well as valuable industrial species such as catfish and sander. Tench and silver Prussian carp can also be found in the bays of Horbachykha.
