= Rybalskyi Peninsula =

Peninsula on the Dnieper River in Kyiv, Ukraine

- Peninsula
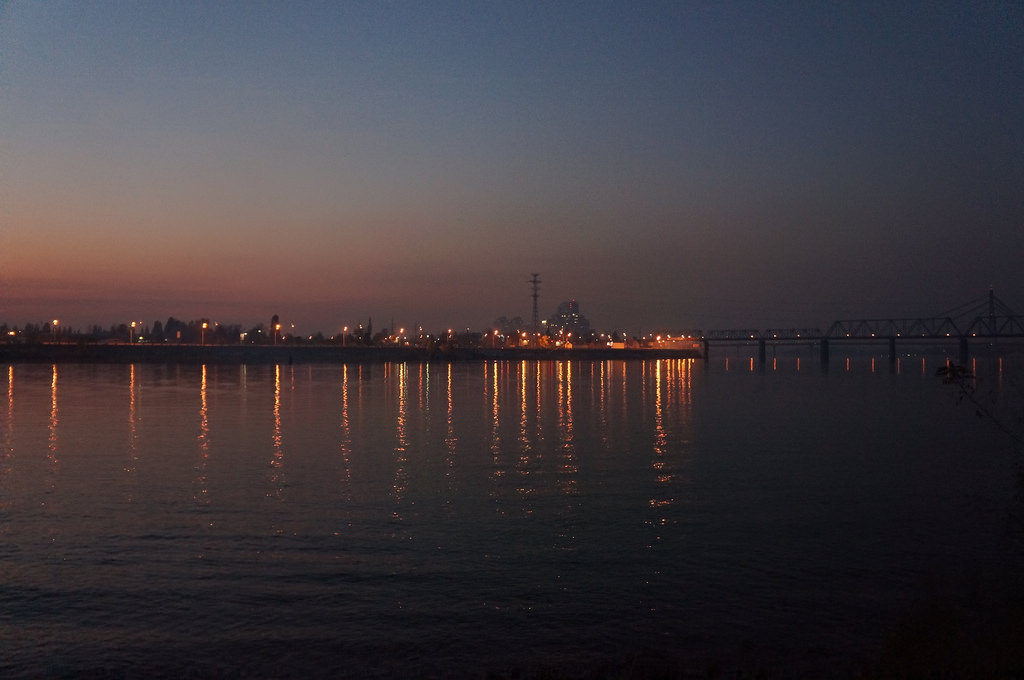
- Evening view of Rybalskyi Peninsula from Trukhaniv Island with the Rybalskyi Railroad Bridge on the right.

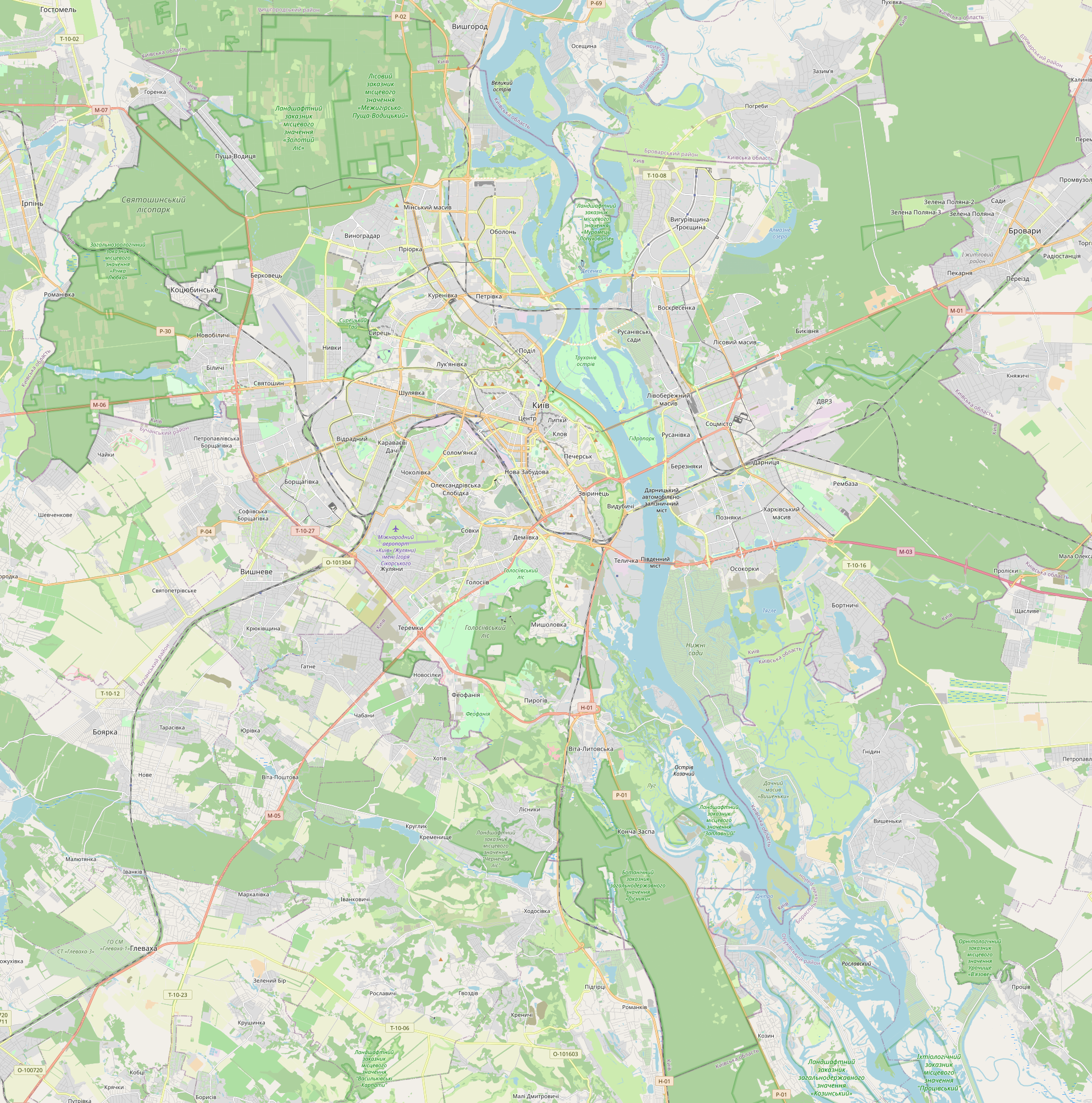
- Interactive map of Rybalskyi Peninsula
- Coordinates: 50.48°N 30.53°E
- Location: Kyiv, Ukraine
- Part of: Rybalskyi island (peninsula) and Kyiv City Harbour in reference to Dnieper

The Rybalskyi Peninsula (Ukrainian: Рибальський півострів, romanized: Rybalskyi pivostriv, lit. 'Fishermen's peninsula'), referred to locally as Rybalskyi Island (Рибальський Острів), is a peninsula on the Dnieper River, located in the right-bank Podil neighborhood and Kyiv Harbor of the city of Kyiv. It was also a spit serving as a left-bank of the Pochaina, a historical river that with time transformed into several oxbow lakes located in Obolon (see Opechen lakes). The peninsula is now a predominantly industrial area.

== History ==
The peninsula was formed from clay deposits, which served as the left bank of the Pochaina River. Rybalskyi Peninsula takes its name from the fishermen of Podil who once lived on it. In 1897-1899, the peninsula was raised and strengthened, which would later enable it to house a local shipyard for steamboats (engineered by M.Maksymovych), as well as to form the newly built Kyiv Harbor between the peninsula and the Podil riverbank.

In 1926-1930, an electrical power station was constructed in the north-western part of the peninsula (engineered by B. Domanskyi and M. Parusnikov), today Thermal power station-2 (power and heat producing station). During this time an industrial area developed here. On the banks of the harbor in the Sailors Park, a ship monument to Monitor Zhelezniakov was installed on a pedestal. In 1929 Petrovsky Railway Bridge (now the Rybalskyi Railway Bridge) was finally officially opened after 10 year of abandonment. At the end of the 1930s, the Kuznya na Rybalskomu shipbuilding factory was reconstructed (it has been owned by the President of Ukraine Petro Poroshenko till 2018, and by Sergiy Tigipko since).

During the Second World War, the peninsula suffered heavy damage from bombings. After the war, reconstruction began, while new factories and foundations were constructed. The Petrovsky Railway Bridge, shipyard, power station, and others were rebuilt.

== Present infrastructure ==
In 1961, piers of the new Kyiv River Port was built in the harbor, and in 1963 the Kyiv cable-stayed bridge was constructed to provide road access to the Rybalskyi Peninsula from the center of the city. In 2001 the bridge was closed to vehicle traffic, because of its conditions. In 2009 it was closed completely and eventually was partially disassembled with the construction of the new Kyiv Harbor Bridge.

The main compound of the HUR MOU, the military intelligence institution, is located on the Rybalskyi Peninsula.

== Development plans ==
In 2005, plans were released for the perspective reconstruction of the Rybalskyi Peninsula, by the year 2020. Included into the plan are residential and business buildings, underground parking, hotel-office combination buildings, trade centers, and socio-cultural constructions. In addition, the Kyiv Metro station, Sudnobudyvina of the Podilsko-Vyhurivska Line, is currently being constructed on the peninsula, which will provide better access to the peninsula from the city.

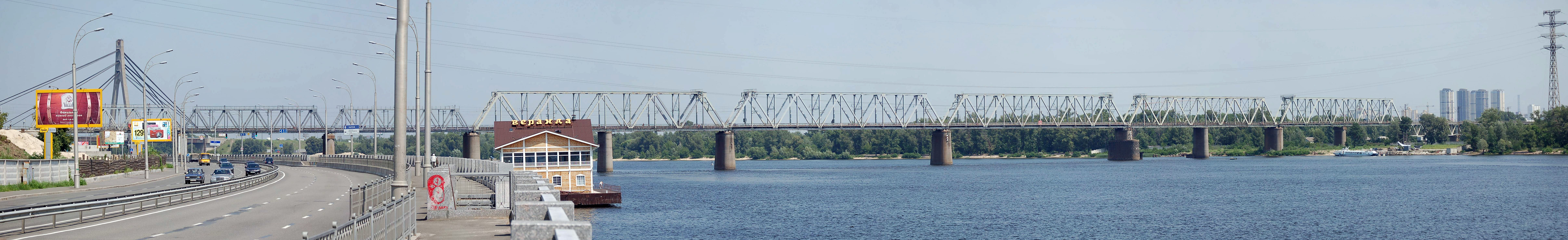
Petrivka (Rybalskyi) railway bridge and the pylon of Pivnichnyi Bridge (formerly Moskovsky Bridge; view from Rybalskyi Peninsula)
