= Mostobud =

Ukrainian construction company

- Industry: Construction
- Founded: 1945, in Ukraine

Mostobud is the biggest construction company in Ukraine and the Commonwealth of Independent States in building bridges, bridge structures, trestles, tunnels and interchanges, ports and housing throughout the world. It is the major construction contractor for bridges in the city of Kyiv.

== History ==
The company was created in August 1945 as Urban development office of Upper-Dnieper basin of GlavMostStroi of People's Commissariat of Communication Roads (MostoStroi #1) by the declaration of the State Defense Committee and the People's Commissariat of Communication Roads (Transportation). The main office was established in Kyiv.

In 1993 the company was reorganized into Mostobud.

== Built objects ==
- Around 4,000 engineer structures among which some 900 railroad bridges, 2,100 road bridges, and others
- Ukrainian House, Ukrainian museum of the Great Patriotic War 1941-45, others
- The company workers participated in the construction of the Baikal–Amur Mainline (BAM)
- Podilskyi Bridge and highway in Zaporizhzhia
