= Harbour Bridge (Kyiv) =

Harbour Bridge Гаванський міст
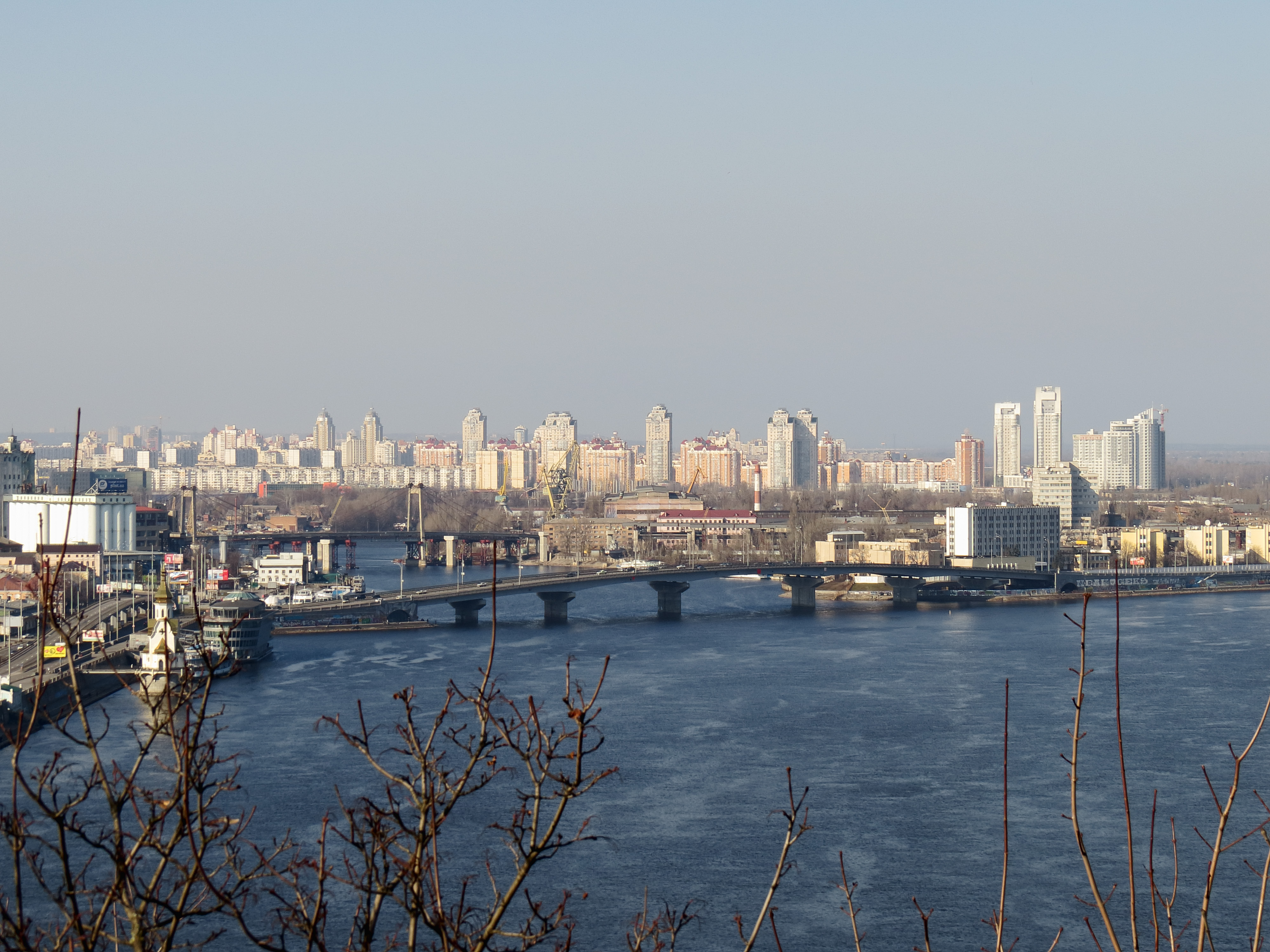
- Coordinates: 50°28′08″N 30°31′37″E
- Carries: Automobiles
- Crosses: Kyiv Harbour entrance
- Locale: Kyiv, Ukraine
- Preceded by: Old cable-stayed bridge

Characteristics
- Total length: 380 m
- Width: 35 m

History
- Construction start: 2005
- Construction end: 2010
- Opened: 2007

Statistics
- Daily traffic: 2 way (3 lanes each way)

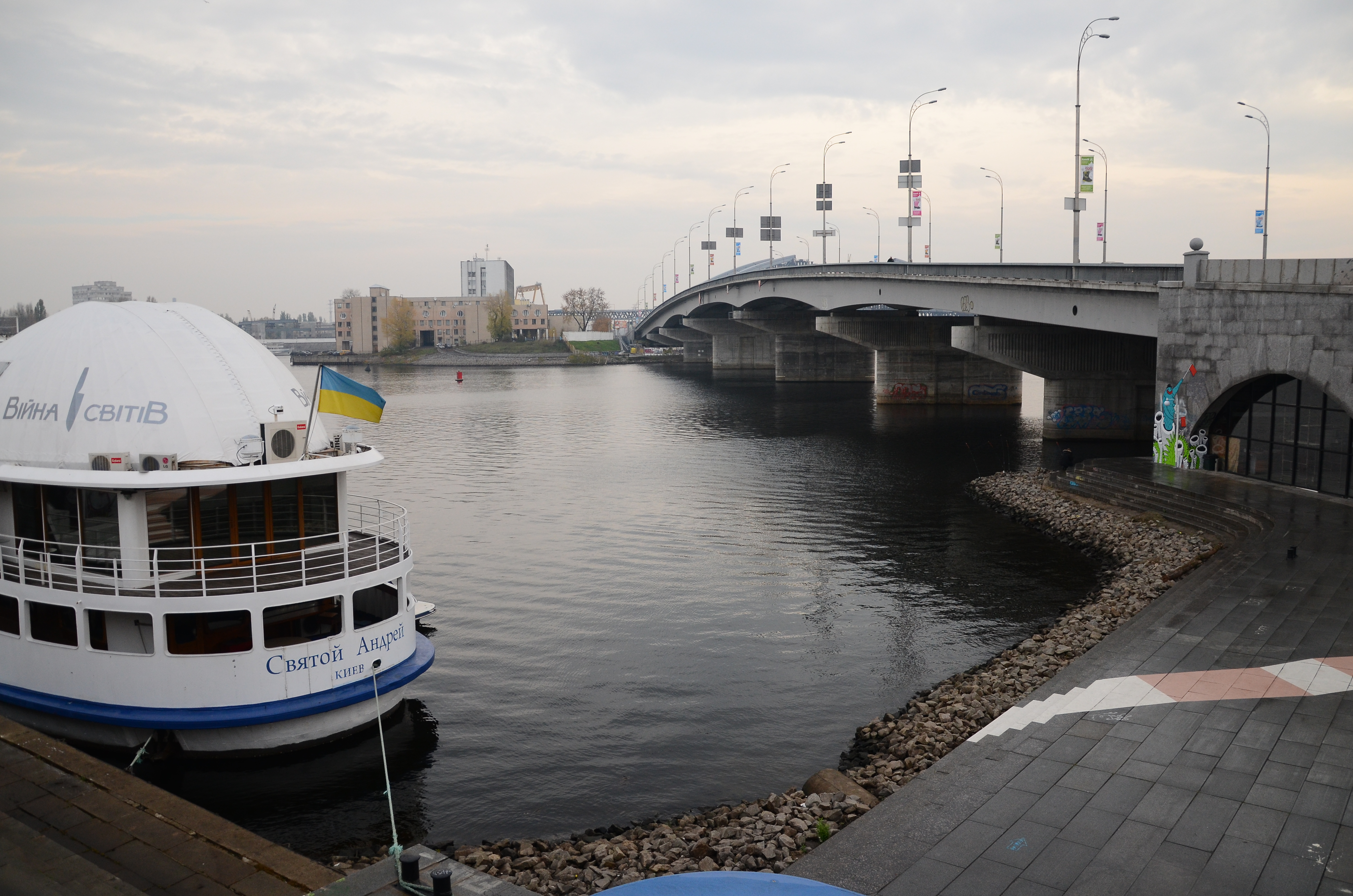

The Harbour Bridge (Ukrainian: Гаванський міст, romanized: Havanskyi mist, IPA: [ˈɦɑwɐnʲsʲkɪj ˈmist]) is a beam bridge in Kyiv across the city's harbour, built in 2010.

== Overview ==
The bridge stretches over the entrance to the Kyiv Harbour located between Podil and Obolon neighborhoods. It has a length of 380 m (1,250 ft). The bridge provides quicker access to Rybalskyi Peninsula and connects both city's embankment streets straightening out the contour of Dnieper right bank.

Previously in its place there already existed cable-stayed bridge that was closed down due to its bad conditions. The construction of the new bridge started in 2005. In 2007 the way was opened to the traffic moving from Podil to Obolon (south-north). In 2010 the construction was completely finished and traffic started to move in both directions.

== See also ==
- Bridges in Kyiv
