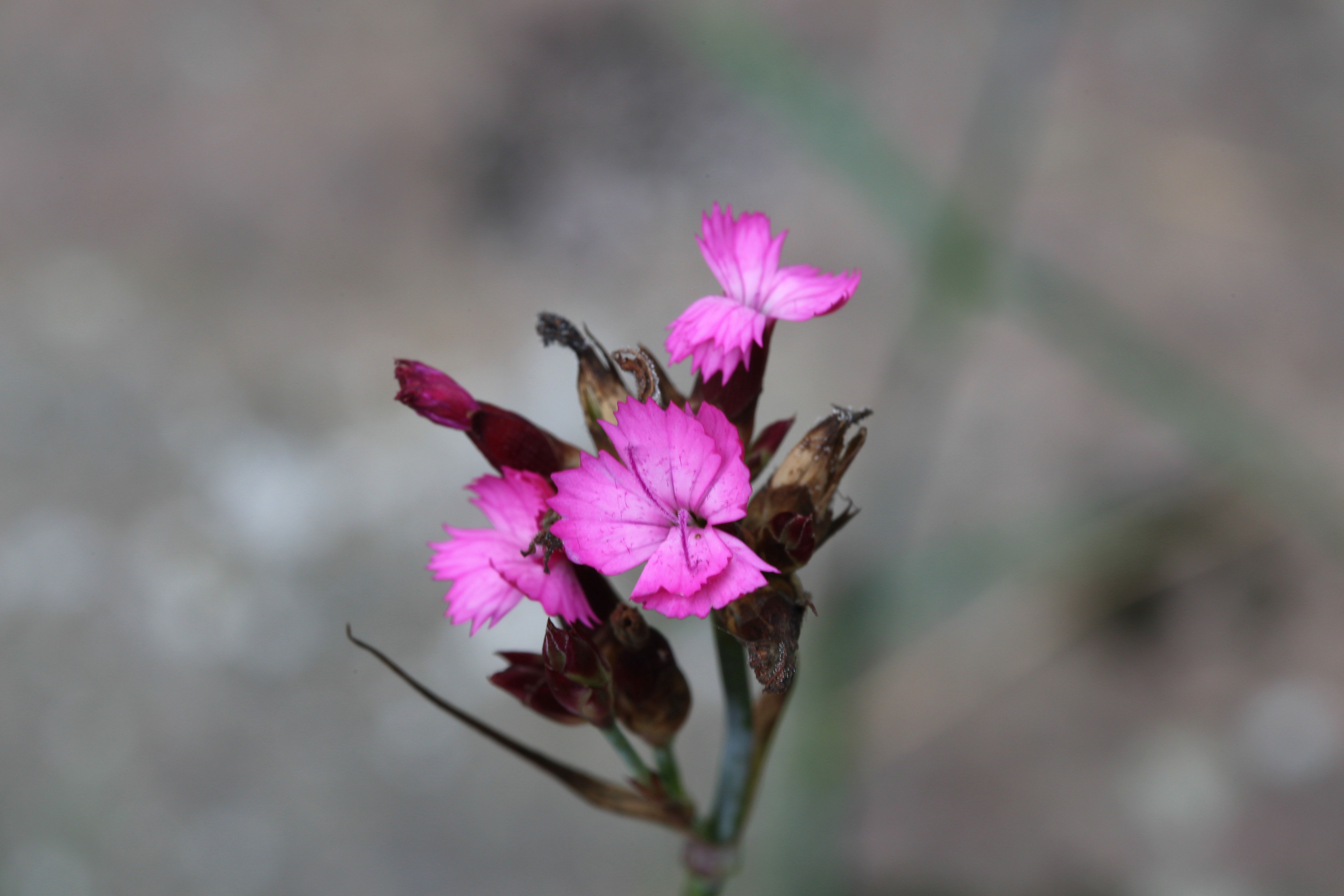

Scientific classification
- Kingdom: Plantae
- Clade: Tracheophytes
- Clade: Angiosperms
- Clade: Eudicots
- Order: Caryophyllales
- Family: Caryophyllaceae
- Genus: Dianthus
- Species: D. borbasii

Binomial name
- Dianthus borbasii Vandas

= Dianthus borbasii =

Species of flowering plant

Dianthus borbasii is a species of Dianthus in the carnation family native to the steppes and light pine woodlands of Eastern Europe and western Asia as far as Kazakhstan. They prefer to grow in sandier soils, or places with light disturbance, so that there is less competition from grasses.
