= Podilsko–Vyhurivska line =

Future metro line in Kyiv, Ukraine

Podilsko-Vyhurivska line

Overview
- Locale: Kyiv, Ukraine

Service
- Type: Rapid transit
- System: Kyiv Metro
- Operator(s): Kyivskyi Metropoliten

History
- Opened: Under Construction

Technical
- Track gauge: 1,520 mm (4 ft 11 27/32 in)

The Podilsko–Vyhurivska line (Ukrainian: Подільсько-Вигурівська лінія, romanized: Podilsko-Vyhurivska liniia) formerly the Podilsko–Voskresenska line (Подільсько-Воскресенська лінія) will be the fourth addition to the Kyiv Metro system in Kyiv, Ukraine. Presently under construction, when finished, it will contain 18 stations and be approximately 20 kilometers long. This line will serve as an important relief for existing and over-stretched transfer points. The first segment is due to open after 2022, with the project being fully completed by 2030. This line is colored orange on the maps.

== Plan and construction ==
Like most Kyiv Metro lines, it will open in a set of stages. The first is planned to be a three-station deep-level segment which will run from the existing Vokzalna station of the Sviatoshynsko–Brovarska line northwards to Hlybochytska. This will be a transfer to the Lukianivska station on the Syretsko–Pecherska line. The second segment will then continue eastwards to the Podil region of Kyiv and across the Dnieper River on a combined automobile bridge through Trukhaniv Island, and into the northern left-bank districts. Most of the second segment's stations will be shallow-level or elevated.

Even though the Vokzalna-Hlybochytska segment is planned to open first, it is also likely that the first stage segments described above will open in the opposite order. This is because at present the new bridge, currently under construction, is of top importance to relieve automobile congestion. However, in doing so, the already laiden Kurenivskyi radius of the Obolonsko–Teremkivska line, on which carries the passengers from the Obolon district, will now add those traveling to and from Troieshchyna. The two districts are largest in Kyiv, and there are serious concerns about the older line being able to handle the new increase in the passenger load; thus it is more likely that the whole first stage will open simultaneously.

== Opening schedule ==
Two subsequent extensions will follow the first stage. The first one will be the Voskresenky radius to the southwest, with five stations. It will continue the line from the Railway station through the Solomianskyi District all the way across to the Kyiv International Airport at Zhuliany and the residential districts on the circular highway. The northeastern extension is slightly more complex, as the line will split. The first branch will continue east with two stations to Bratislavska, parallel with the existing Sviatoshynsko–Brovarska line. The second, northern branch will annex the whole of Kyiv fast tram's #2 route, converted it to Metro standards. It is expected that the branch system will be in operation until the future Livoberezhna line will take the northern branch off the Podilsko-Vyhurivska in mid-2030s.

== See also ==
- Podilskyi Bridge
