= Trukhaniv Island =

Island in Kyiv, Ukraine

Native name: Труханів острів
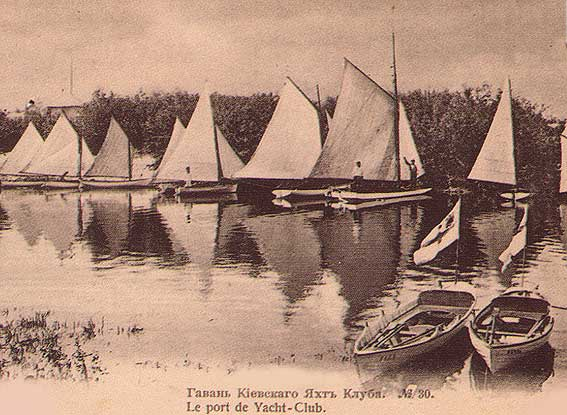
- A former yacht club on Trukhaniv Island

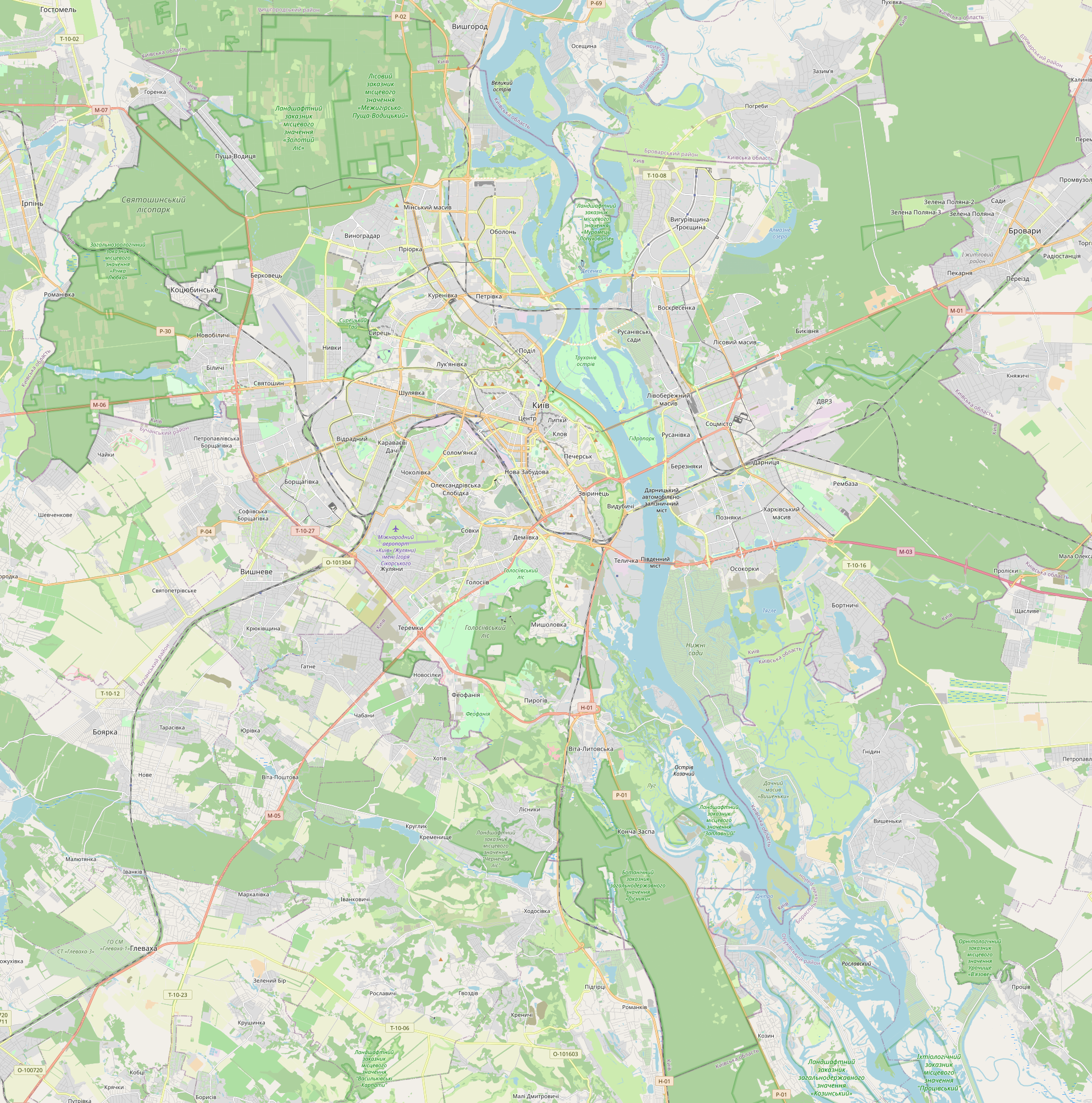
- Location within Ukraine Kyiv Location within Ukraine
- Interactive map of Trukhaniv Island

Geography
- Location: Dnieper River
- Coordinates: 50°27′48″N 30°32′42″E
- Area: 4.5 km^{2} (1.7 sq mi)
- Highest point: N/A

Administration
- Ukraine
- Region: Kyiv, Kyiv Oblast
- District: Dniprovsky, Vyshhorod

The Trukhaniv Island (Ukrainian: Труханів острів, romanized: Trukhaniv ostriv) is located on the Dnieper River opposite the historic Podil neighbourhood of the city of Kyiv.

== Location ==
The island is located on the north side where the Dnieper enters the premises of Kyiv city, with its north part extending some distance north towards the mouth of Desna River. It is located in the confluence of both Desna River and Dnieper River. Situated up the stream of Dnieper within the city of Kyiv, the island starts a system of Dnieper River islands which ends with the Olzhyn Island. Up the stream of Dnieper River to the north of Trukhaniv is located the Great Island (Velykyi), to the east along Desenka is Lopukhovaty, down the stream to the south are located Venetsiansky and Dolobetsky islands. There are also several other smaller islands located around the Trukhaniv Island.

The island is separated from the right-bank of Kyiv by the Dnieper and from the left-bank Kyiv by Desenka which is a distributary of Desna River, making Trukhaniv island part of its river delta. The Trukhaniv island is split by another distributary called Bobrovnia which serves a conditional border between the territory of Vyshhorod Raion and the Kyiv city. Technically Bobrovnia splits the island into Ilya Muromets Island (north, in Vyshhorod Raion) and Trukhaniv Island (south, in Kyiv). The Kyiv's portion of island administratively is part of Dniprovskyi city district.

It has an area of 4.5 km^{2} (1.7 sq mi). The island is mostly covered by greenery, like the Venetsiansky island nearby. Until 1957, the only method of transportation to the island was by boat in the summer or by crossing the ice in the winter. In 1957, the Park Pedestrian Bridge was built, easing the travel to and from the island.

Trukhaniv Island contains numerous cafés, restaurants, sports complexes, and the largest as well as one of the cleanest city beaches. The island is not only popular for its various leisure activities, but it is also for fishing on the Dnieper River. In the summer, some parts of the island are used for biking, and in the winter some parts are used for cross-country skiing.

In the summer of 2005, tourists traveling to see the Eurovision Song Contest 2005 were housed on Trukhaniv Island.

In the summer of 2012, tourists traveling to see the UEFA Euro 2012 were housed on Trukhaniv Island.

== Points of interest ==
- Desna cottage and hotel resort (owned by Ukrtelecom)
- Park of the People's Friendship
- Bobrovnia tract
- Hotel resorts (Chervona Kalyna, Borysfen, Atika, Trukhaniv, Berizka)
- Chaika hotel resort with helipad
- Water ski park "X-Park"
- Motocross stadium
- Vehicle motorpool of the Kyiv municipal company Kyivshlyakhmist
- Dovbychka nudist beach
- Central beach
- Scuba diving and rescue station
- Water sports station (owned by Kuznya na Rybalskomu)
- Sports school of academic rowing and canoe "Kyiv"
- Sports school of academic rowing "Burevisnyk"
- Sports school 7
- Sports school of Olympic reserve "Lokomotyv"

=== Streets ===
- Pivnichnyi Bridge road
- Trukhaniv vulytsia (Trukhaniv street)
- Vulytsia Parkova Doroha (Street "Park Road")

== History ==
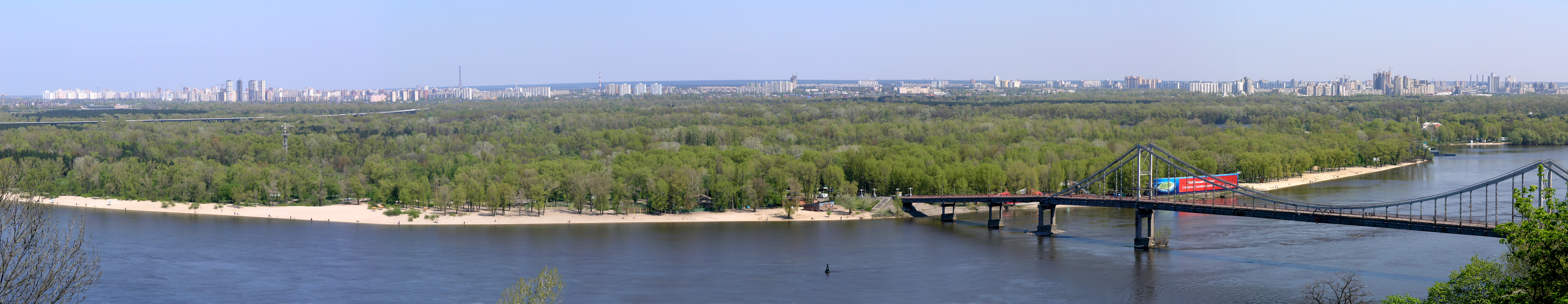
Trukhaniv island (central portion) with the pedestrian Park Bridge

Folk etymology derives the island's name from Tugor-khan (also transcribed Turkogan) of Cumania, who won a victory over Kyiv and whose daughter married Prince Sviatopolk II of Kyiv. The summer residence of his daughter and her husband was allegedly named in honor of Tugor-khan, although in truth his name is mentioned but once in Slavonic chronicles. In 1534 the island came under control of the Pustynno-Mykilsky monastery, and was later returned to the city in 1698.

The first buildings on the island were erected in the beginning of the 19th century. During the 1880s, the first businesses began to appear on the island. During the Second World War German forces completely destroyed the island settlements in order to have better control and a clearer view of the city of Kyiv. In post-war times, the island was not rebuilt as a settlement, but as a leisure center.

== Gallery ==
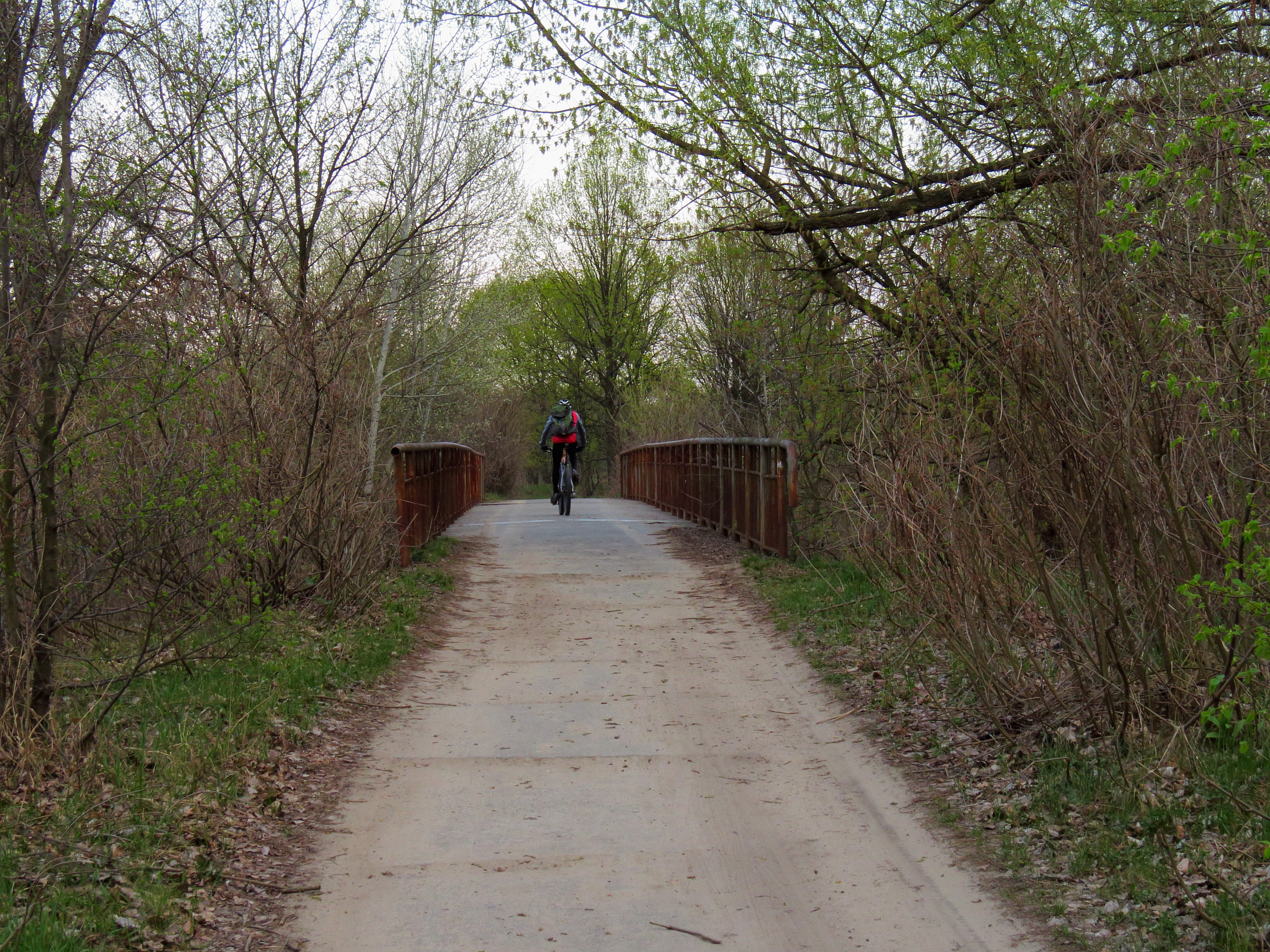
There are two bridges over Bobrovnia, both pedestrian. This one is the northern.

== See also ==
- Trukhaniv Ostriv (Kyiv Metro), is a station on the island under construction.
- Pivnichnyi Bridge
- List of islands of Ukraine
