= Hidropark (Kyiv Metro) =

Kyiv Metro Station

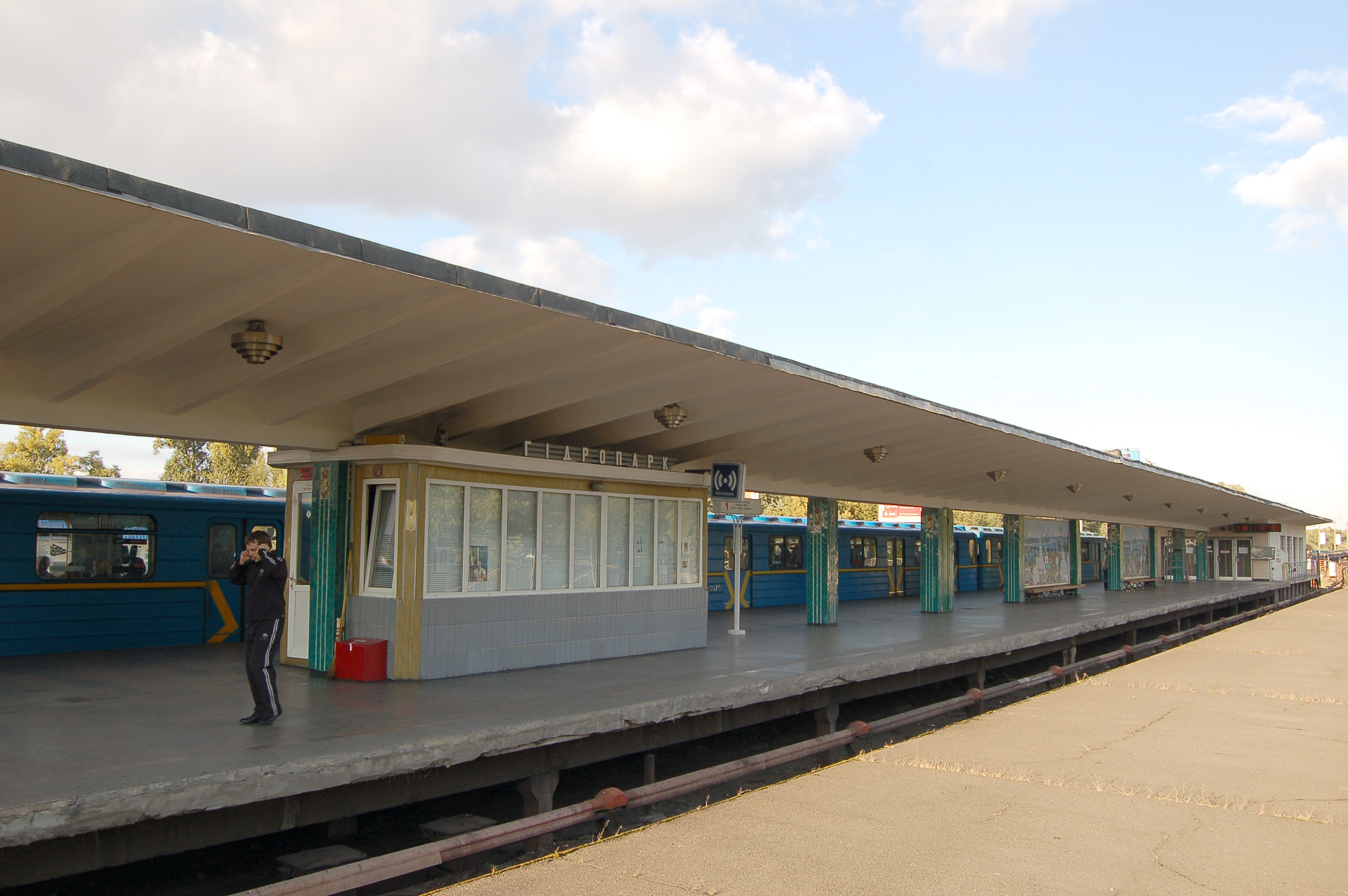

General information
- Location: Dniprovskyi District; Kyiv; Ukraine
- Coordinates: 50°26′45″N 30°34′37″E
- System: Kyiv Metro station
- Owner: Kyiv Metro
- Line: Sviatoshynsko–Brovarska line
- Platforms: 2
- Tracks: 2

Construction
- Structure type: surface platform
- Platform levels: 1

Other information
- Station code: 123

History
- Opened: 5 November 1965

Services
Preceding station	Kyiv Metro	Following station
Dnipro towards Akademmistechko	Sviatoshynsko–Brovarska line	Livoberezhna towards Lisova
Location

Hidropark (Ukrainian: Гідропарк,) is a station on the Kyiv Metro's Sviatoshynsko–Brovarska line. The station was closed from 24 February 2022 to 1 April 2023 due to the Russian invasion of Ukraine.

== Station ==
The station was opened on 5 November 1965 as part of the construction of the Brovarsky radius. The station is situated on the Venetsiiskyi Island right next to Hydropark. Unpopulated and not used for housing, it was transformed by the station into a summer resort for Kyivans when it fell in between the future line to Darnytsia and the new Brovary avenue that ran parallel to it.

Such planning is explained in the seasonal operation timetable which make the station rather distinctive. During the summer months, it receives quite a moderate passenger traffic, particularly on weekends and public holidays. During the winter months, there have been known instances when not a person would get on or off the station for whole weeks. There have even been attempts for the station to be skipped during peak hours.

In its appearance, the station is a typical example of the 1960s policy on Soviet public architecture. The station minimised costs and has a simple and aesthetic appearance; its architects were I. Maslenkov and V. Bohdanovsky. A lone grey granite faced platform with a concrete hinged roof is supported by green ceramic tiled pillars. The only decoration that prevents the station from losing its face completely are small ceramic flower motifs on the top of the pillars. Entrances and exits come from two vestibules that are located under the platform and connected with large subways that run underneath the station and Brovary Avenue.

A unique feature of the station is that it has a second southern platform that would have allowed a quicker unload of passengers from the centrebound areas. However, its use was discontinued in 1985 and in turn a second, western vestibule was built in 1990. However, during the winter months, it is closed and the space is used otherwise.

Just like all metro stations in Kyiv, Hidropark station was closed on 24 February 2022 due to the Russian invasion of Ukraine. On 1 April 2023 the station was reopened. On 23 March 2023 Mayor of Kyiv Vitali Klitschko announced that the station would not be operational during Russian missile strikes targeting Kyiv.

== Gallery ==
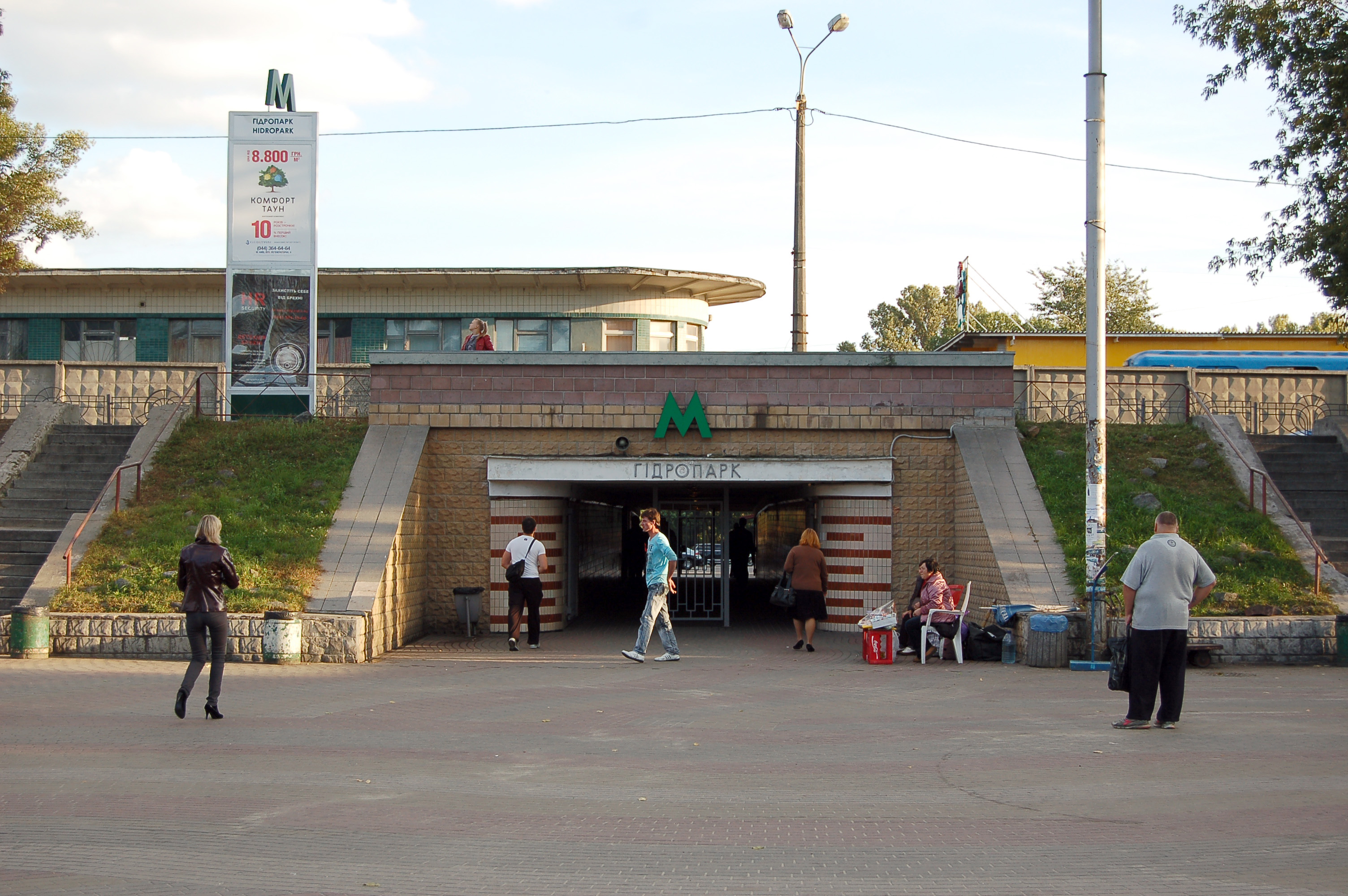
Original entrance

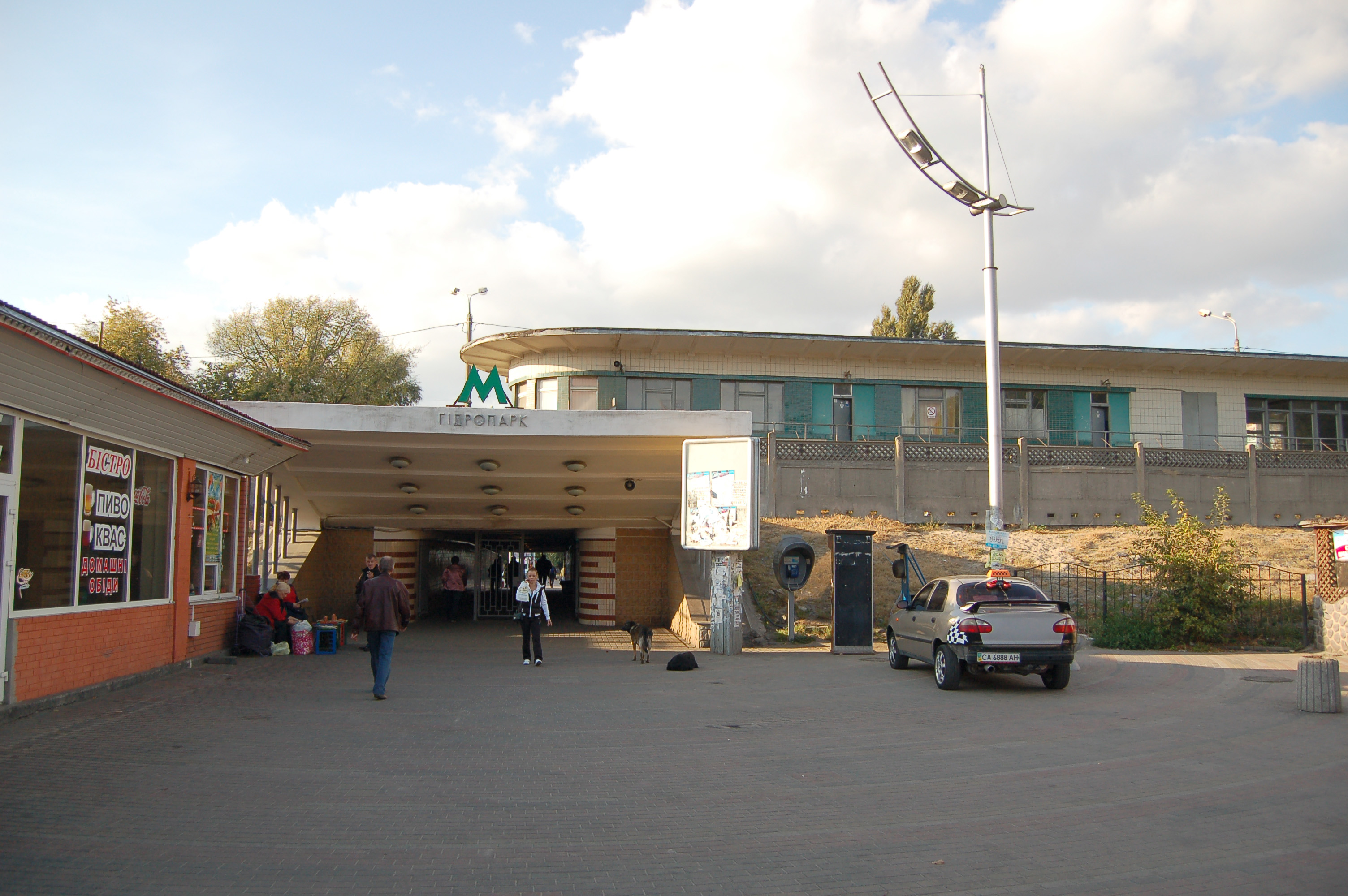
Opposite end

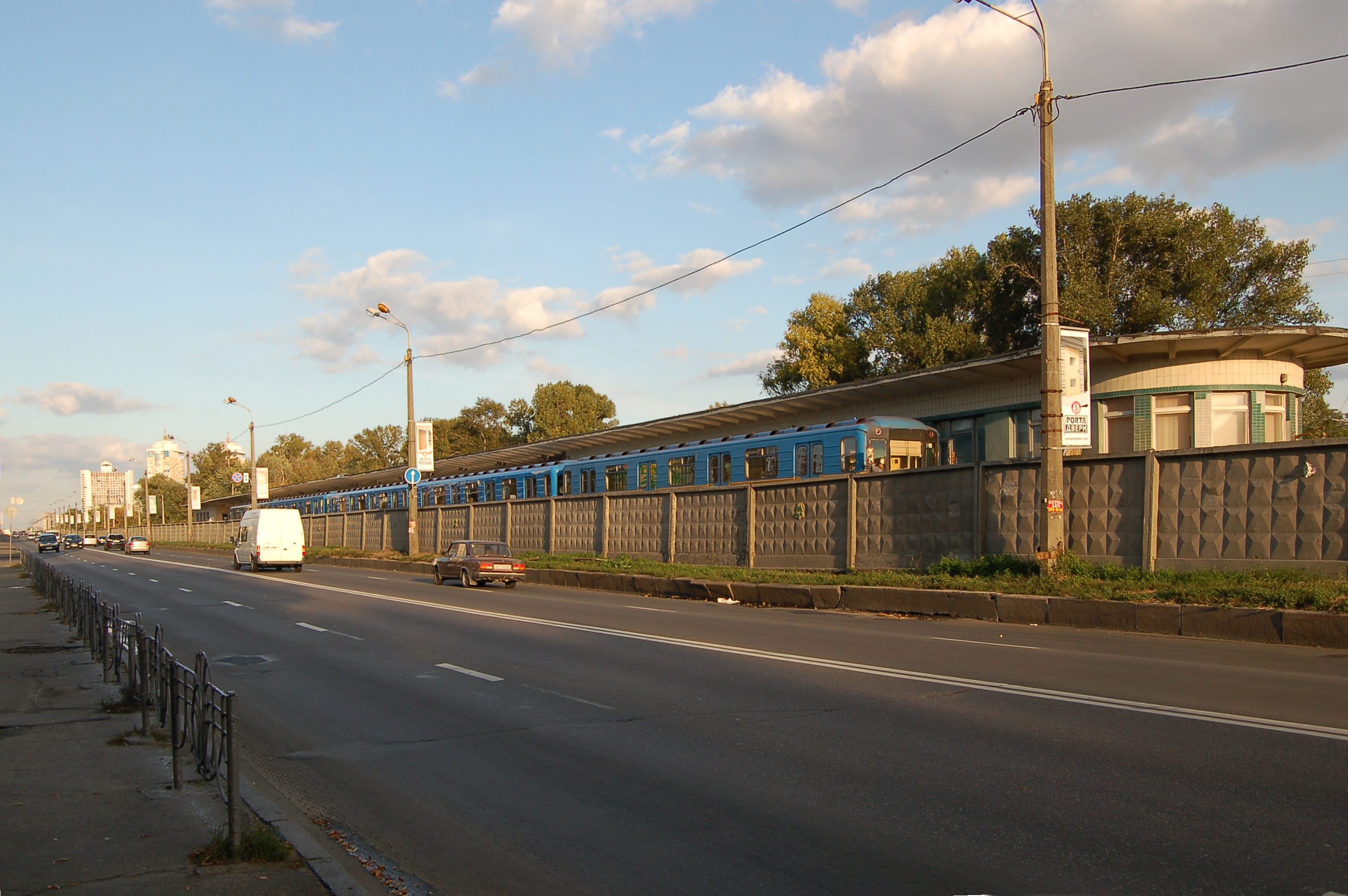
View across the Brovary avenue

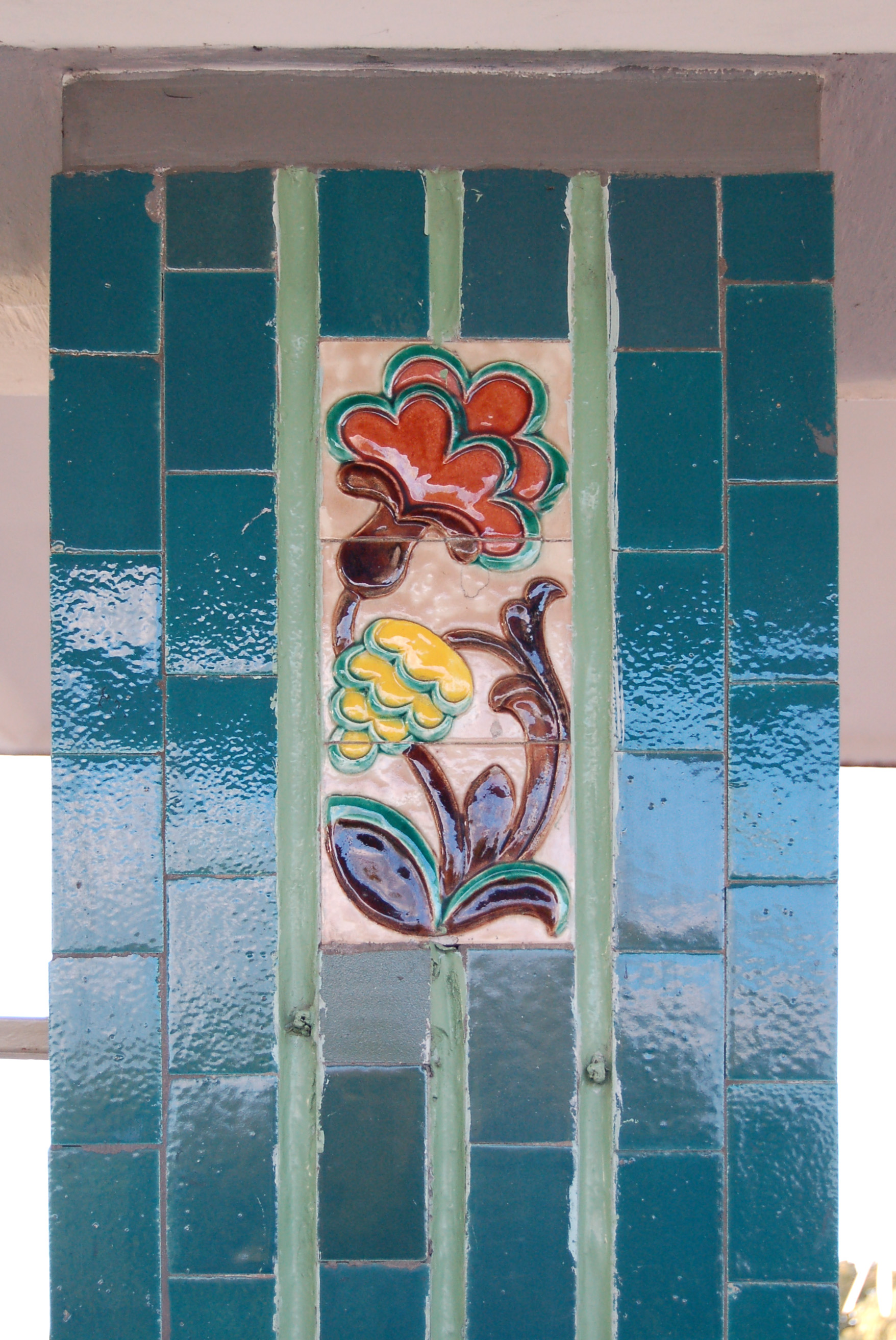
Decorative feature
