= Shuliavska (Kyiv Metro) =

Kyiv Metro Station

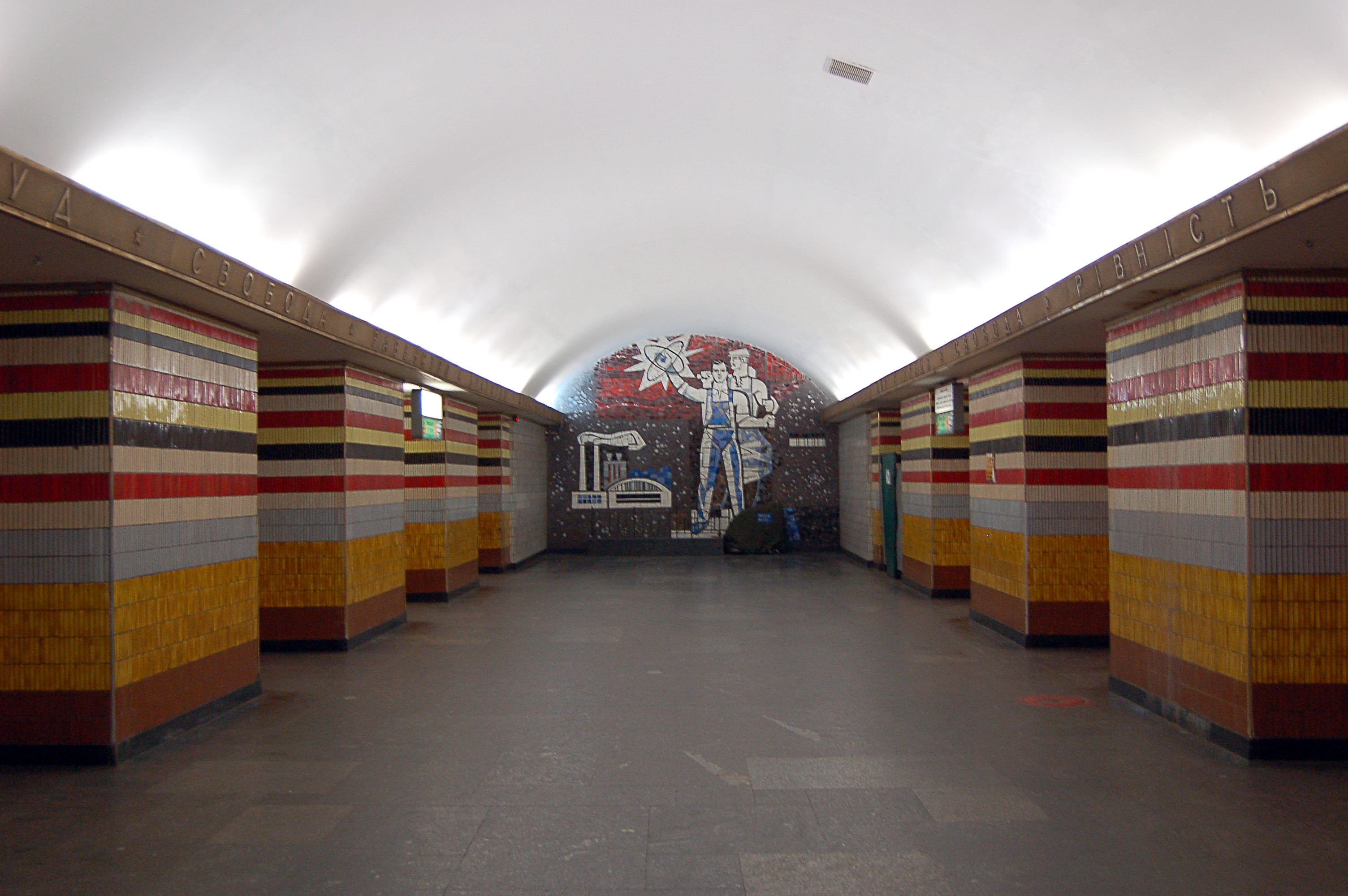
- The mosaics of the central hall

General information
- Location: Shevchenkivskyi District; Kyiv; Ukraine
- Coordinates: 50°27′18″N 30°26′44″E
- System: Kyiv Metro station
- Owner: Kyiv Metro
- Line: Sviatoshynsko–Brovarska line
- Platforms: 1 island platform
- Tracks: 2

Construction
- Structure type: underground
- Depth: 92 m (302 ft)
- Platform levels: 1

Other information
- Station code: 115

History
- Opened: November 5, 1963
- Former names: Zavod Bilshovyk

Services
Preceding station	Kyiv Metro	Following station
Beresteiska towards Akademmistechko	Sviatoshynsko–Brovarska line	Politekhnichnyi Instytut towards Lisova
Location

Shuliavska (Ukrainian: Шулявська,) is a station on the Sviatoshynsko-Brovarska Line of the Kyiv Metro system that serves Kyiv, the capital city of Ukraine. The station was opened on 5 November 1963, and is named after Kyiv's Shuliavka neighbourhood. It was designed by A.V. Dobrovolskyi, B.I. Pryimak, A.I. Malynovskyi, and A.I. Cherkasskyi. The station was formerly known as the Zavod Bilshovyk station (Ukrainian: Завод "Більшовик").

The station has been laid deep underground due to problems with water isolation during its construction. It consists of a central hall with rows of columns near the platforms. The columns are covered with glazed tiles, consisting of rows of different coloured tiles. The entrance to the station is located on the corner of the Prospect Beresteiskyi (Brest Avenue) and the Dovzhenko Street.
