= Teatralna (Kyiv Metro) =

Kyiv Metro Station

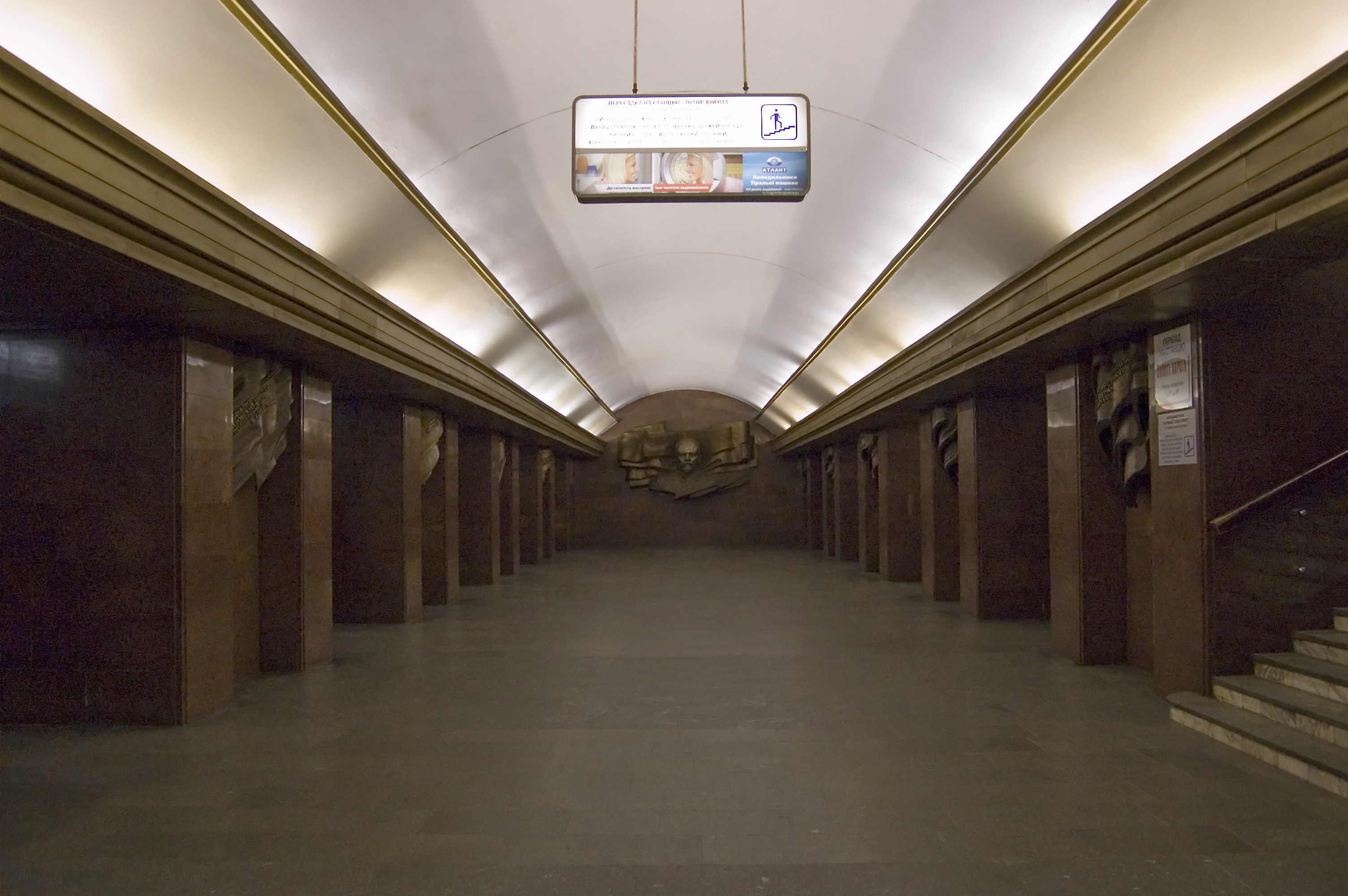
- The Station Hall

General information
- Location: Shevchenkivskyi District; Kyiv; Ukraine
- Coordinates: 50°26′43″N 30°31′05″E
- System: Kyiv Metro station
- Owner: Kyiv Metro
- Line: Sviatoshynsko–Brovarska line
- Platforms: 1
- Tracks: 2

Construction
- Structure type: underground
- Depth: 70 m (230 ft)
- Platform levels: 1

Other information
- Station code: 119

History
- Opened: 6 November 1987
- Former names: Leninska

Services
Preceding station	Kyiv Metro	Following station
Universytet towards Akademmistechko	Sviatoshynsko–Brovarska line	Khreshchatyk towards Lisova
Lukianivska towards Syrets	Syretsko–Pecherska line transfer at Zoloti Vorota	Palats Sportu towards Chervonyi Khutir
Location

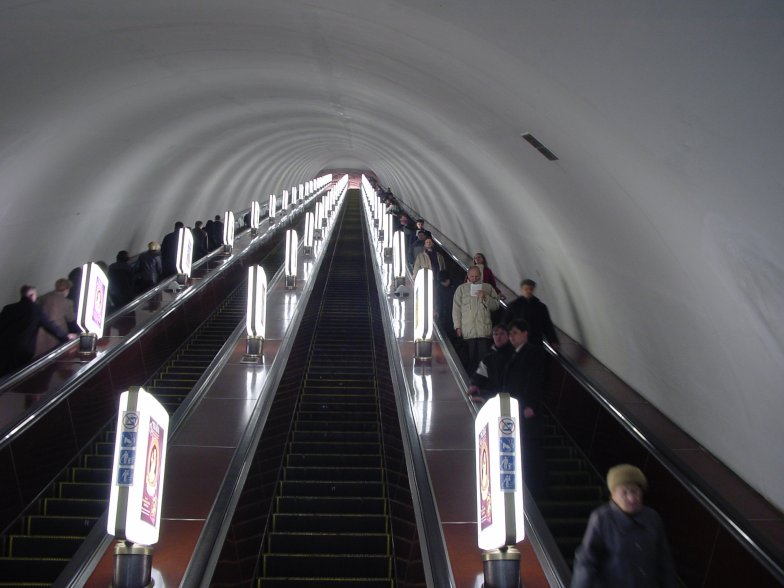
Escalators at the station.

Teatralna (Ukrainian: Театральна,) is a station on the Sviatoshynsko-Brovarska Line of the Kyiv Metro system, in Ukraine. The station serves as a transfer point, via a pedestrian walkway connecting it to the Zoloti Vorota station on the Syretsko-Pecherska Line. The station was opened on 6 November 1987, between the Universytet and Khreshchatyk stations which were opened 27 years earlier.

The station owes its name to the Kyiv Opera Theatre located a few blocks away, and Lesya Ukrainka National Academic Theater, next to the metro entrance. Prior to 1992, the station was known as Leninska (Ukrainian: Ленiнська; Russian: Ленинская, romanized: Leninskaya) from its location on Leninska Street (renamed to Khmelnytska Street), in reference to Soviet leader Vladimir Lenin.

== History ==
In the original 1950s Kyiv Metro development plans, the northwest-southeast Syretsko-Pecherska Line was not foreseen. Therefore, no space was left for a transfer station on the Sviatoshynsko-Brovarska line. When the former line was being planned during the 1970s, it was decided that a new station was to be built onto the existing track.

The original curved tunnels lacked any provision for a future platform and a new section had to be bored to create a straight section for the new station. Construction began simultaneously when the work commenced on the Syretsko-Pecherska Line in the early 1980s. During the last six months of construction, the service on the line was disrupted, and the Sviatoshynsko-Brovarska Line was effectively split in two, with a replacement bus service operating free of charge between the two stations on either end, Universytet from the west, and Khreshchatyk from the east, respectively. Finally, on 7 November 1987 (the 70th anniversary of the October Revolution), the Teatralna station was opened to the public. The a portion of the old tunnel sections were then used to build the enlarged vault of Zoloti Vorota, which opened in 1989. An underground walkway connects the rear end of Zoloti Vorota to the side of Tetralna, allowing passengers to change lines without leaving the metro.

== Architecture ==
The Teatralna station's decor, until 2014, strongly recalled its former name, that of commemorating Vladimir Lenin. As it was located between two earlier stations constructed in the Stalinist style, its architects T. Tselikovska, N. Aloshkin and A. Krushynsky took care not to create any sharp contrasts between the Teatralna station and those that were already existing. Rich red marble adorns thick pylons which separate the platforms from the central hall. They held (until 2014) niches decorated with bronze sculptures showing the name and life years of Vladimir Lenin, leading up to a large bronze bas-relief at the end of the central hall. The walls are revetted with white marble and the floor is laid with grey granite.

In the early 1990s, almost all of the Lenin plaques, statues and individual sculptures were removed from around Kyiv, including from other Metro stations. Leninska station was renamed to Teatralna in 1992. However, the statue on the street and bas-relief in the station were retained, among just a handful of surviving Lenin monuments in Kyiv.

Keeping the Lenin monuments on the station cost the director of the metro company, Mykola Shavlovsky, his position. Kyiv Mayor Leonid Chernovetsky criticized Shavlovsky for lack of order in the metro. "Everything is left as it was in the 1970s. Socialism is still left in the metro-just take a ride-the citations of Vladimir Lenin are all around [on Teatralna station]. But even Lenin did not want such a metro as it is these days."

On 25 February 2014, the Lenin bas-relief and quotes hanging up in the station's hall were covered from the public view by an order of the metro's administration. This occurred not long after numerous Lenin monuments were dismantled throughout the country. On 7 November 2014, a plywood 3D image of an opera theatre was installed at the end of the station hall, covering up the still existent Lenin bas-relief.

In 2007 there was a proposal for a second entrance to the station.
