= Universytet (Kyiv Metro) =

Kyiv Metro Station

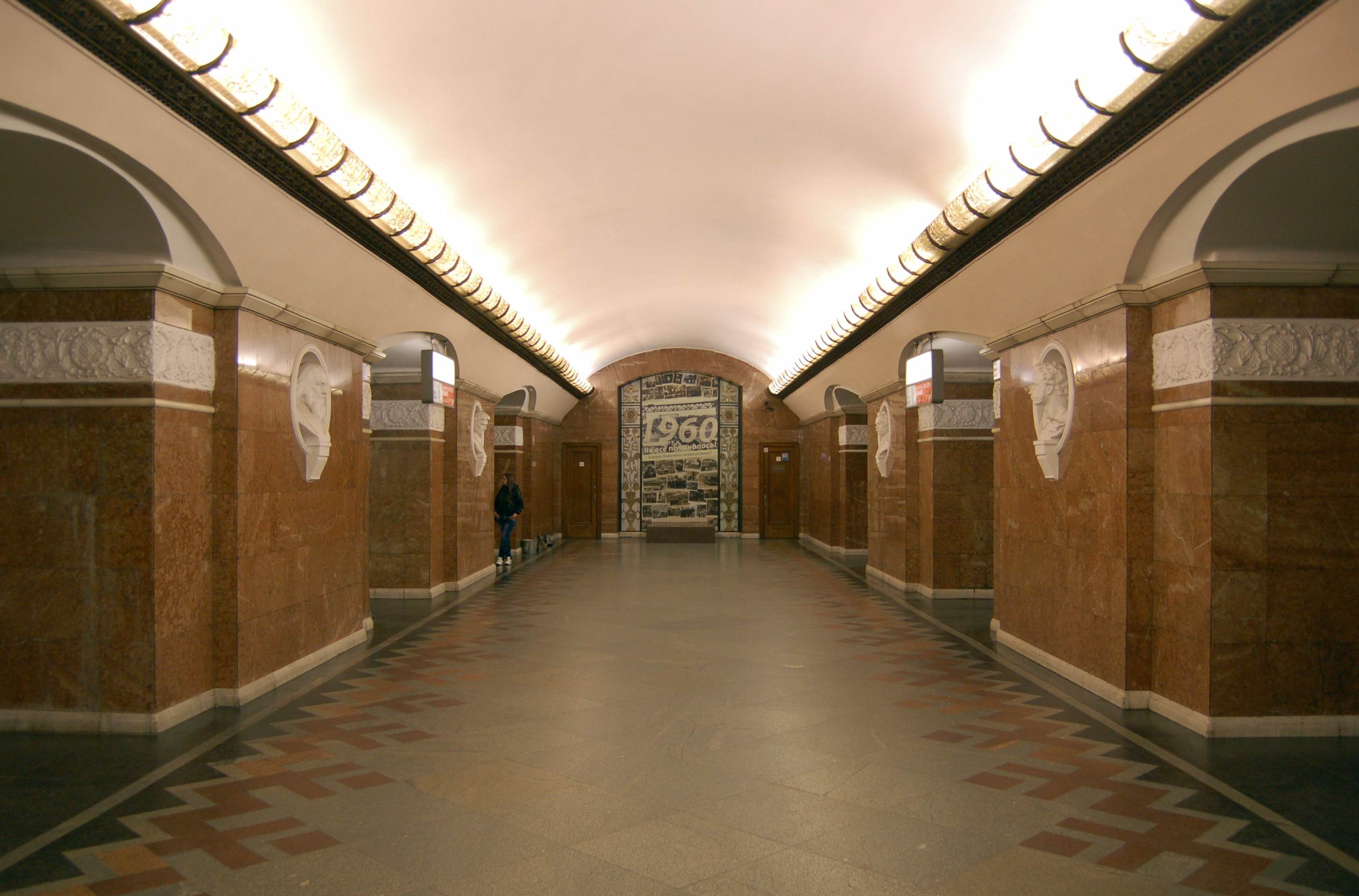
- The central station hall in 2010 with niches featuring busts of Ukrainian and Russian writers and scientists. Shortly after the 2022 Russian invasion of Ukraine, the busts of Russian figures have been covered with wooden boards.

General information
- Location: Shevchenkivskyi District; Kyiv; Ukraine
- Coordinates: 50°26′39″N 30°30′22″E
- System: Kyiv Metro station
- Owner: Kyiv Metro
- Line: Sviatoshynsko–Brovarska line
- Platforms: 1
- Tracks: 2

Construction
- Structure type: underground
- Depth: 87 m (285 ft)
- Platform levels: 1

Other information
- Station code: 118

History
- Opened: 6 November 1960

Passengers
- 2008: 23,900

Services
Preceding station	Kyiv Metro	Following station
Vokzalna towards Akademmistechko	Sviatoshynsko–Brovarska line	Teatralna towards Lisova
Location

Universytet (Ukrainian: Унiверситет,) is a station on the Kyiv Metro's Sviatoshynsko-Brovarska Line in Kyiv, Ukraine. The station was opened on 6 November 1960 as part of the first stage of the metro's construction. It is named after the Taras Shevchenko National University of Kyiv, which is located in direct proximity to the station itself.

== Architecture ==
The station is a pylon trivault and is considered to be amongst the most beautiful stations in the system, and is currently the only one in Kyiv that is the closest in appearance to the famous Stalinist architecture used in the Moscow and Saint Petersburg Metros of the 1950s. It was designed by architects H.Holovka, M.Syrkin, Ye.Ivanov, Zh.Yegulashvili, L.Semenyuk and O.Lozynska. The red marbled pylons were adorned in 1960 with white marble busts of Ukrainian and Russian writers and scientists: Ukrainians Ivan Franko, Taras Shevchenko, Oleksandr Bogomolets, Hryhorii Skovoroda, and Russians Alexander Pushkin, Maxim Gorky, Mikhail Lomonosov and Dmitri Mendeleev. Since the beginning of the 2022 Russian invasion of Ukraine, the busts of Pushkin, Gorky, Lomonosov, and Mendeleev have been covered with wooden boards, pending their replacement with Ukrainian figures selected by online poll; The proposed replacement figures are Lesya Ukrainka, Vasyl Stus, Konstanty Wasyl Ostrogski, Yaroslav the Wise, Ahatanhel Krymsky, and Yuri Ilyenko. The busts are attributed to sculptors Mikhailo Lysenko (Bogomolets), Andriy Shapran (Lomonosov), Petro Ostapenko (Mendeleev), Valentyn Znoba (Skovoroda), Anatoly Bilostotsky (Shevchenko), Edvard Kuntsevych (Gorky), Oleksandr Kovalov (Pushkin), and Oksana Suprun (Franko).

The white marble friezes also decorate the pylons and lighting is achieved by hidden lamps in the niches of the central vault, and by lamps on the platforms. The walls are covered with orange tiles and the floor is made of various shades of granite arranged in a traditional Ukrainian ornament layout. In the end of the station is white marbled wall, before which a large statue of Vladimir Lenin used to sit. However this was dismantled in the early 1990s, making the station lose its original look.

The station's large vestibule (monument to architecture) is situated in the middle of the A.V. Fomin Botanical Garden with a gallery allowing direct access to the gardens or to Taras Shevchenko Boulevard. The escalator ride consists of two separate tunnels linked in between by a smaller hall.

The station has the status of an architectural monument.

== 2011 bomb scare ==
On 15 April 2011, a suspicious package was discovered at Universytet. The station was evacuated and Ukrainian Security Services investigated, determining that the package was not dangerous. The scare followed the 11 April 2011 Minsk Metro bombing.

== 2022 Russian invasion ==
During the 2022 Russian invasion of Ukraine, Universytet station, along with other metro stations in Ukraine, was used as a bomb shelter. Shortly after the invasion the busts (on display in the metro station) of Russian writers/scientists Alexander Pushkin, Maxim Gorky, Mikhail Lomonosov and Dmitri Mendeleev have been covered with wooden boards. From 10 to 24 May 2023 the public could choose who would replace these Russians through an electronic survey.

== Gallery ==
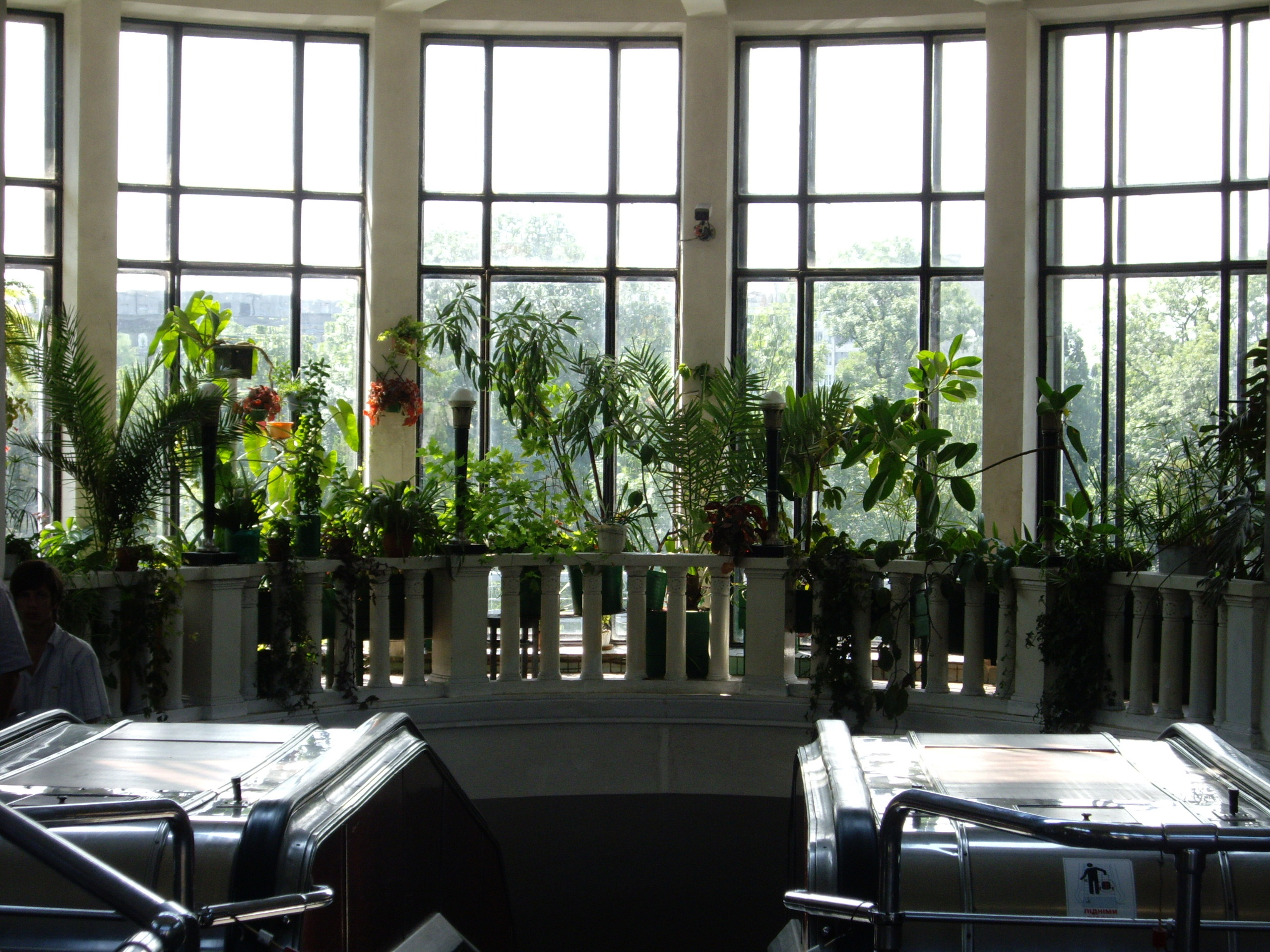
Escalators towards platforms in August 2007

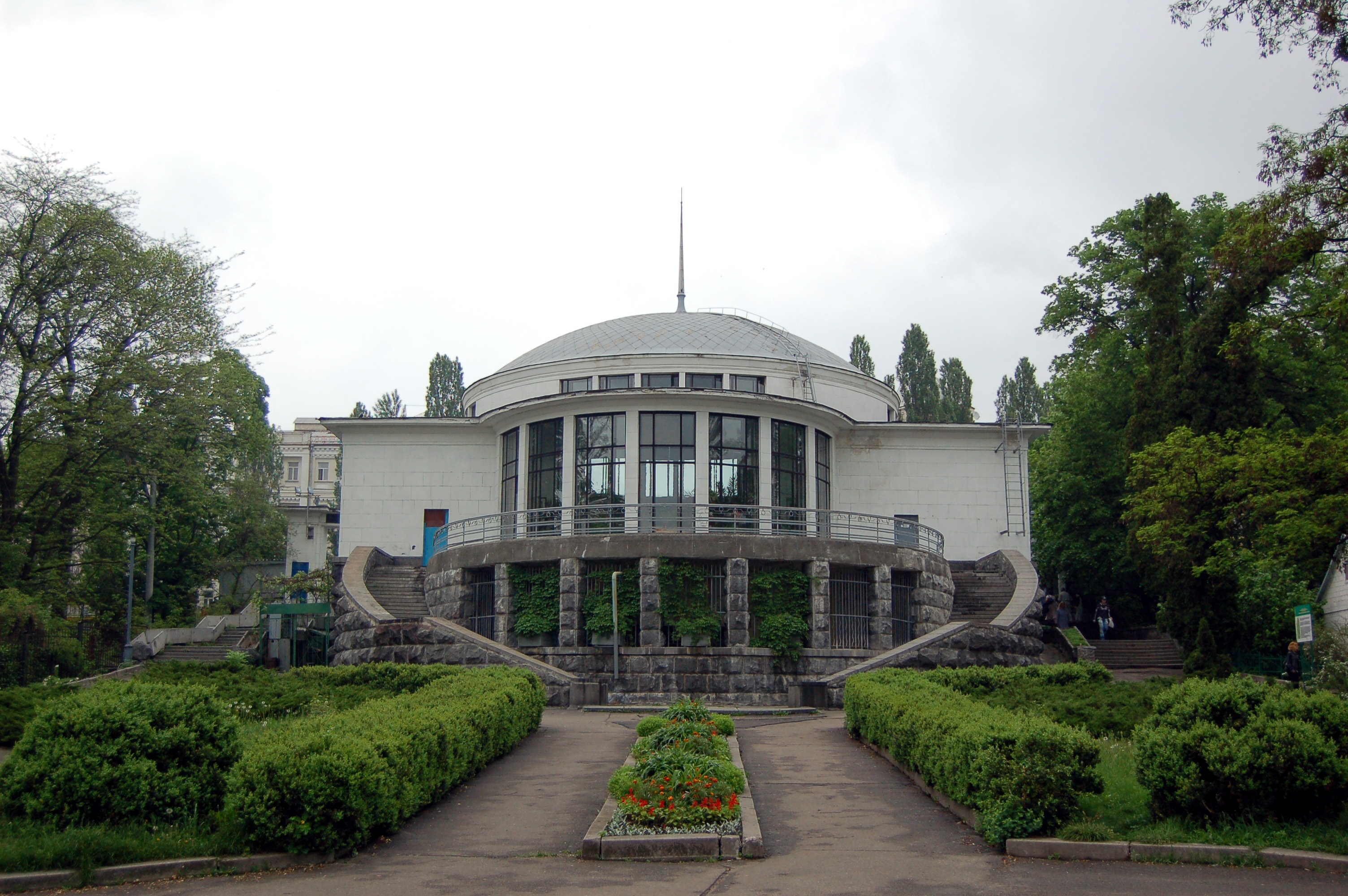
Universytet station's vestibule is recognised as an outstanding architectural monument of Kyiv

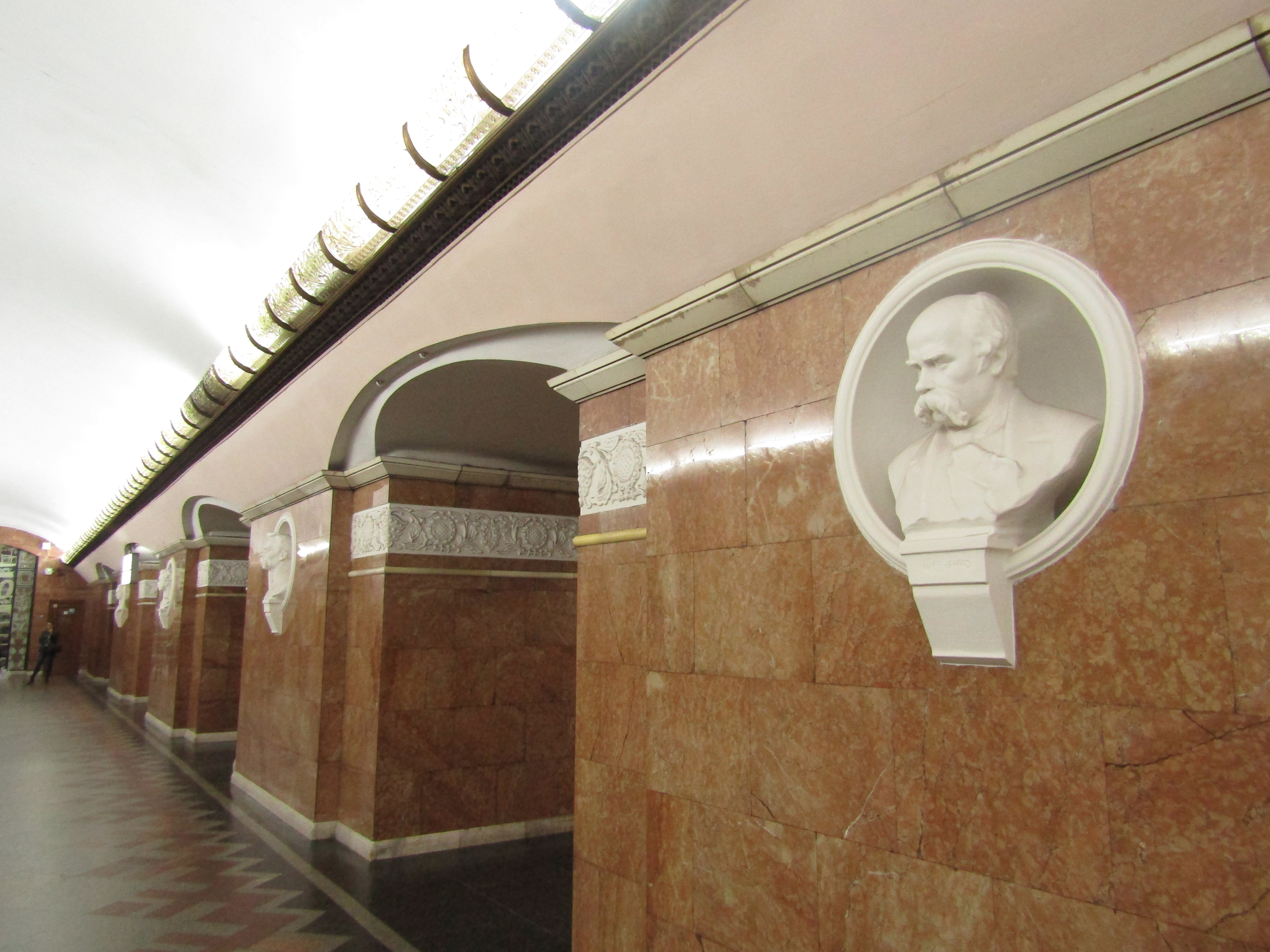
Bust to Taras Shevchenko in the central station hall in September 2016

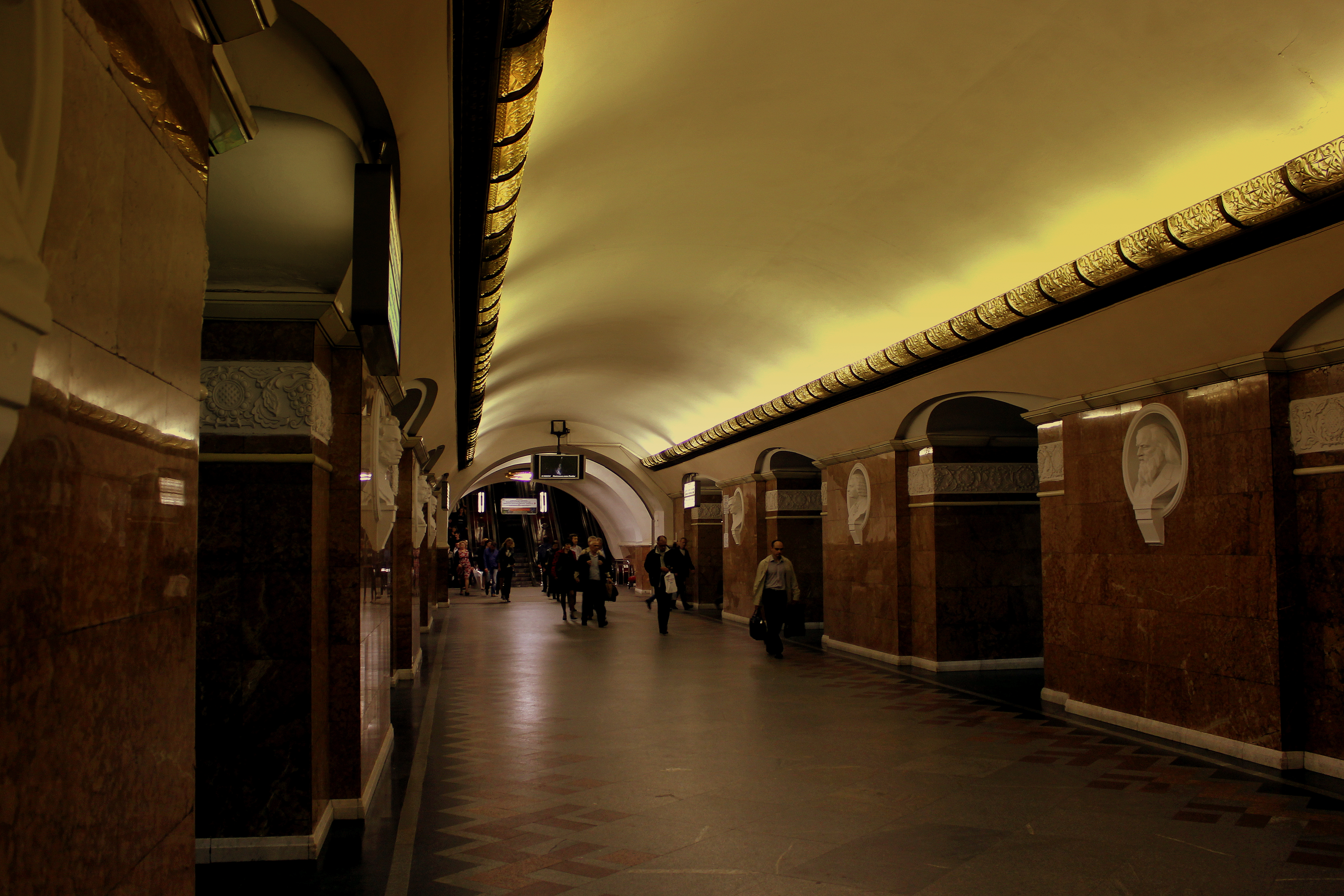
The central station hall in September 2013

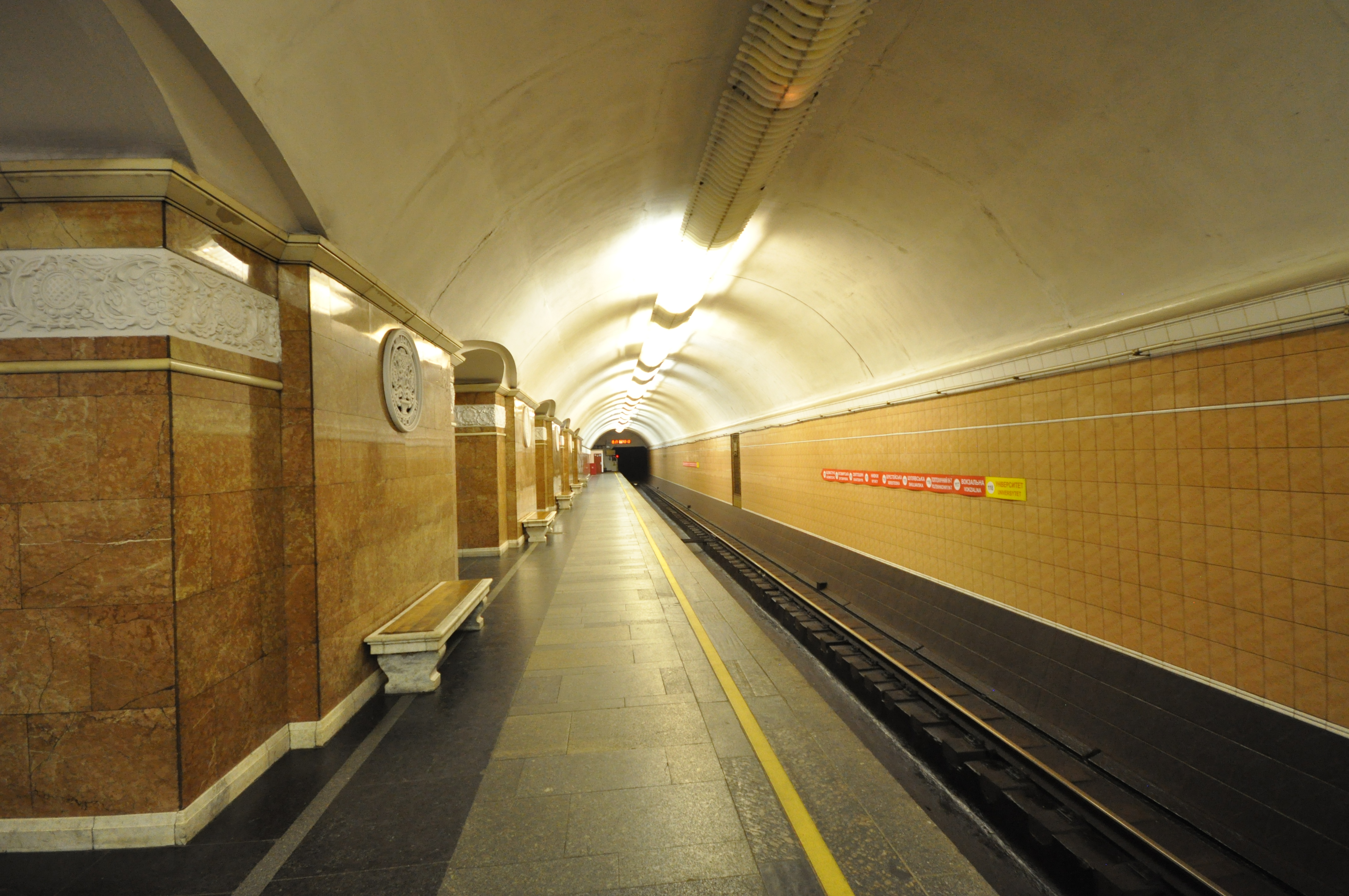
Platform in 2012

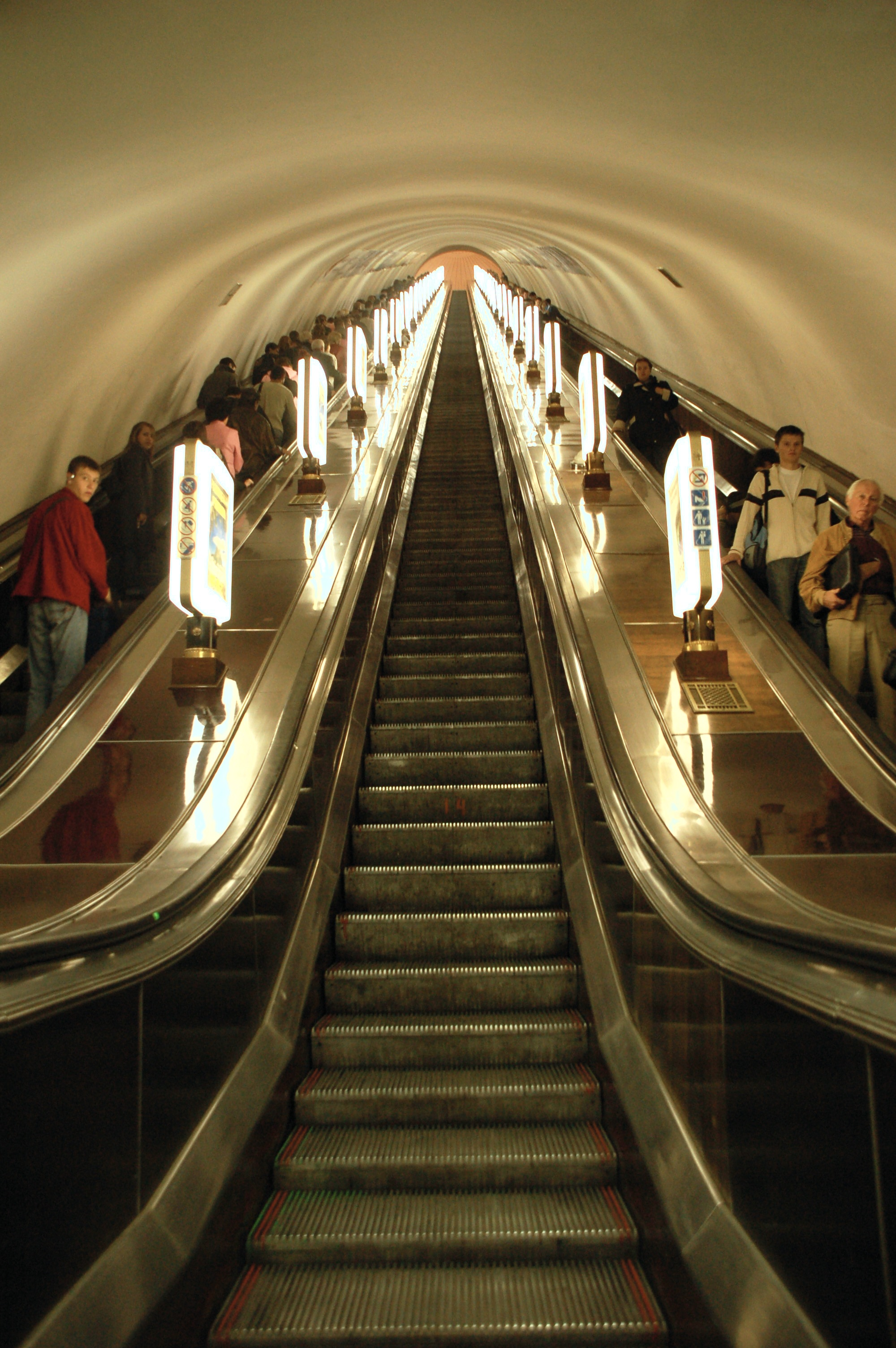
Escalators in 2006
