= Dnipro (Kyiv Metro) =

Kyiv Metro Station

- A train approaching the station at dawn

General information
- Location: Pecherskyi District; Kyiv; Ukraine
- Coordinates: 50°26′28″N 30°33′33″E
- System: Kyiv Metro station
- Owner: Kyiv Metro
- Line: Sviatoshynsko–Brovarska line
- Platforms: 2
- Tracks: 2

Construction
- Structure type: bridge
- Depth: +6 m (20 ft)
- Platform levels: 1

Other information
- Station code: 122

History
- Opened: 6 November 1960

Services
Preceding station	Kyiv Metro	Following station
Arsenalna towards Akademmistechko	Sviatoshynsko–Brovarska line	Hidropark towards Lisova

Immovable Monument of Local Significance of Ukraine
- Official name: Станція метрополітену «Дніпро» (Dnipro metro station)
- Type: Architecture, Urban Planning, Science and Technology
- Reference no.: 529/1-Кв
Location

Dnipro (Ukrainian: Дніпро,) is a station on the Kyiv Metro's Sviatoshynsko-Brovarska Line. Named after the Dnieper River, the station consists of a semi-estacade over the embankment highway, and then continues across the river as part of Kyiv Metro Bridge. The station was opened along with the first stage of the Metro in 1960 and for the first five years, before the bridge was completed, was the eastern terminus of the line. The station was closed from 24 February 2022 to 7 March 2024 due to the Russian invasion of Ukraine. On 7 March, the authorities announced: "From March 8, the Dnipro metro station will resume normal operation."

== Station ==
The station is probably one of the most distinctive designs in not only Kyiv but all of the former USSR. The design is attributed to Kyiv's unique geography and how engineers and city planners applied the Metro development project to it. The goal was to link Kyiv-Pasazhyrskyi railway station via the city centre to the residential districts on the left bank of the river. Since the planned junction between the Brovary avenue and the right bank was to happen at that point, it was decided to turn the metro line first southeast via the Arsenal factory and then make a right angle turn northeast and make the Brovarsky radius go on the surface similar in design to Moscow's Filyovskaya line. The station was to serve this junction point.

In engineering terms, the design incorporates two distinct portions: a large structure on the western side with an estacade track and platforms coming out. Both the engineers (H.Fuks, L.Nobsborsky and V.Ihnatyuk) and the architects (H.Hranatkin, A.Ihnashchenko, P.Krasytsky and S.Krushynsky) put quite an effort into its construction. The western side structure consists of an embankment level vestibule with ticket halls and staircases leading onto the platforms. Although the station has side platforms, it is possible to change direction without leaving the premises of the station.

The estacade level consists of two platforms separated by double track. Originally, when the Brovarsky radius was not completed, the far end of the platform was a large balcony overlooking the river and one of the tracks was covered up by the platform. On the side of the embankment, there are two additional glazed staircase pavilions that are currently closed. On top of them are two statues of Young Pioneers by the sculptors F.Katsyubynsky, E.Kuntsevych, I.Horovy, B.Karlovsky. The statues were erected in 1965 as part of the construction of the Metro Bridge. The northern statue is of a girl releasing pigeons whilst the southern one is of a boy releasing a model of the Sputnik satellite. This has since often symbolised the station as a gateway to the future of the Soviet Union: peace and technological achievement.

Also interesting is that under the station pass the lines of the Kyiv tram, originally there was depot there, but in 1960, when the Metro was opened, it lacked a full depot for serious repairs and the tram depot was converted into a Metro one. Tram tracks were used for rail cars and these were pushed onto a rotor which spun them 90 degrees before hydraulically lifting them up onto the estacade. Although this unique operation was time-consuming, it was nevertheless rarely used as a service bay behind Arsenalna was suitable in most cases. In 1965 after the extension to the left bank, the Darnytsia depot was opened, and both the provisional depot and the rotor/lift were dismantled. (See pre-1965 layout of the station and video of its operation.)

Today the station, although having short passenger traffic, remains the most popular in Kyiv Metro. Most of the people who actually come off there are visitors to the city that are amazed at the construction of this remarkable 40-year-old design. Over the years, its exposure to the elements has necessitated some repair work and renovation which is periodically carried out. The station also remains symbolic in other ways, as it was on the hill of the right bank, where the current portal tunnels are that in 1949 the first tunnel boring shield was launched.

The station was closed on 24 February 2022 at the beginning of the Russian invasion of Ukraine. The station was reopened on 8 March 2024. The Kyiv City State Administration did state on 7 March 2024 that during an air alert, to warn for Russian missile strikes, the station "will be closed for passenger transportation for safety reasons." It was announced that the station would be open from 5:41 a.m. to 10:36 p.m.

== See also ==
- Bridges in Kyiv
