= Beresteiska (Kyiv Metro) =

Kyiv Metro Station

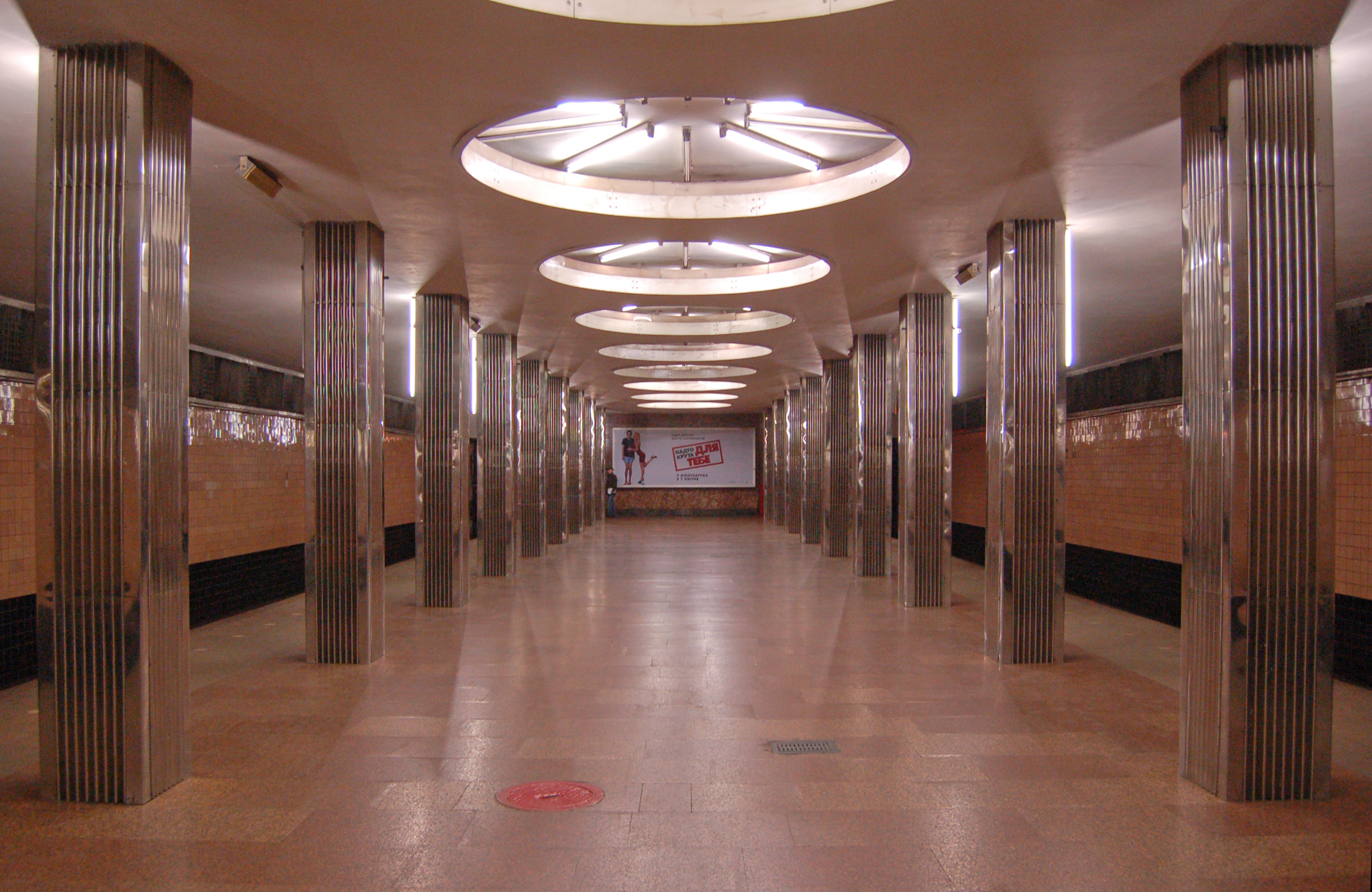
- The Station Hall

General information
- Location: Shevchenkivskyi District; Kyiv; Ukraine
- Coordinates: 50°27′31″N 30°25′11″E
- System: Kyiv Metro station
- Owner: Kyiv Metro
- Line: Sviatoshynsko–Brovarska line
- Platforms: 1
- Tracks: 2

Construction
- Structure type: underground
- Depth: 11 m (36 ft)
- Platform levels: 1

Other information
- Station code: 114

History
- Opened: 5 November 1971
- Former names: Zhovtneva

Services
Preceding station	Kyiv Metro	Following station
Nyvky towards Akademmistechko	Sviatoshynsko–Brovarska line	Shuliavska towards Lisova
Location

Beresteiska (Ukrainian: Берестейська,) is a station on Kyiv Metro's Sviatoshynsko-Brovarska Line in the Ukrainian capital Kyiv. The station was opened in 1971 as part of the second stage of the Sviatoshynskyi radius.

The station is located under the junction between the Prospect Beresteiskyi and the Mykoly Vasylenka/Dehtiarivska streets, and having only one vestibule which is interlinked with subways allowing access to both sides of the intersection. The station, along with its two other neighbours on the same stage, was the first in Kyiv to be a shallow level design built by a cut and cover method, and the first to show the common pillar-trispan design.

Although pillar-trispans, were not new in Soviet Metro construction technology, most of the ones built prior to these stations, particularly in Moscow with the layout of two rows of 40 pillars (resulting in the popular colloquial name sorokonozhka (centipede)), were criticised for their lack of decorative innovation and originality, hence the almost identical appearances. Kyiv's first centipedes were built and opened when the official policy on aesthetic design in Soviet architecture was removed, and as a result the stations are all different and each has its own distinct image.

Beresteiska's design (architects B. Priymak, I. Maslenkov, V. Bohdanovsky and T. Tselikovska.) originates from its former name Zhovtneva (Жовтнева), which translated means October station, or in honour of the October Revolution. Its decoration consists of pillars faced with reflective metallic sheets, orange and black rows of ceramic tiles on the walls and red granite for the floor. Lighting is done by fluorescent tubes on the top of the pillars for the platform, and large circular niches on the ceiling of the central span with ten spiraling fluorescent tubes inside them.

The far end of the central platform has a large wall faced with pink marble that originally held a bronze bas-relief of Vladimir Lenin (work of sculptor B. Karlovsky), but this was removed in the early 1990s leaving an empty space that is now often occupied by advertisements. This influenced the architectural theme of the station which lost its key decoration. Prior to Russian language becoming official in the Metro during the 1980s, Russian press and media referred to this station as Zhovtnevaya (Rus: Жовтневая) instead of its standard translation - Oktyabrskaya (Rus: Октябрьская).

Because the current name relates to Brest, Belarus voters chose to rename the station Buchanska — referring to the Bucha massacre; other choices included Irpinska and Palianytsia — in a poll taken during the Russian invasion of Ukraine.

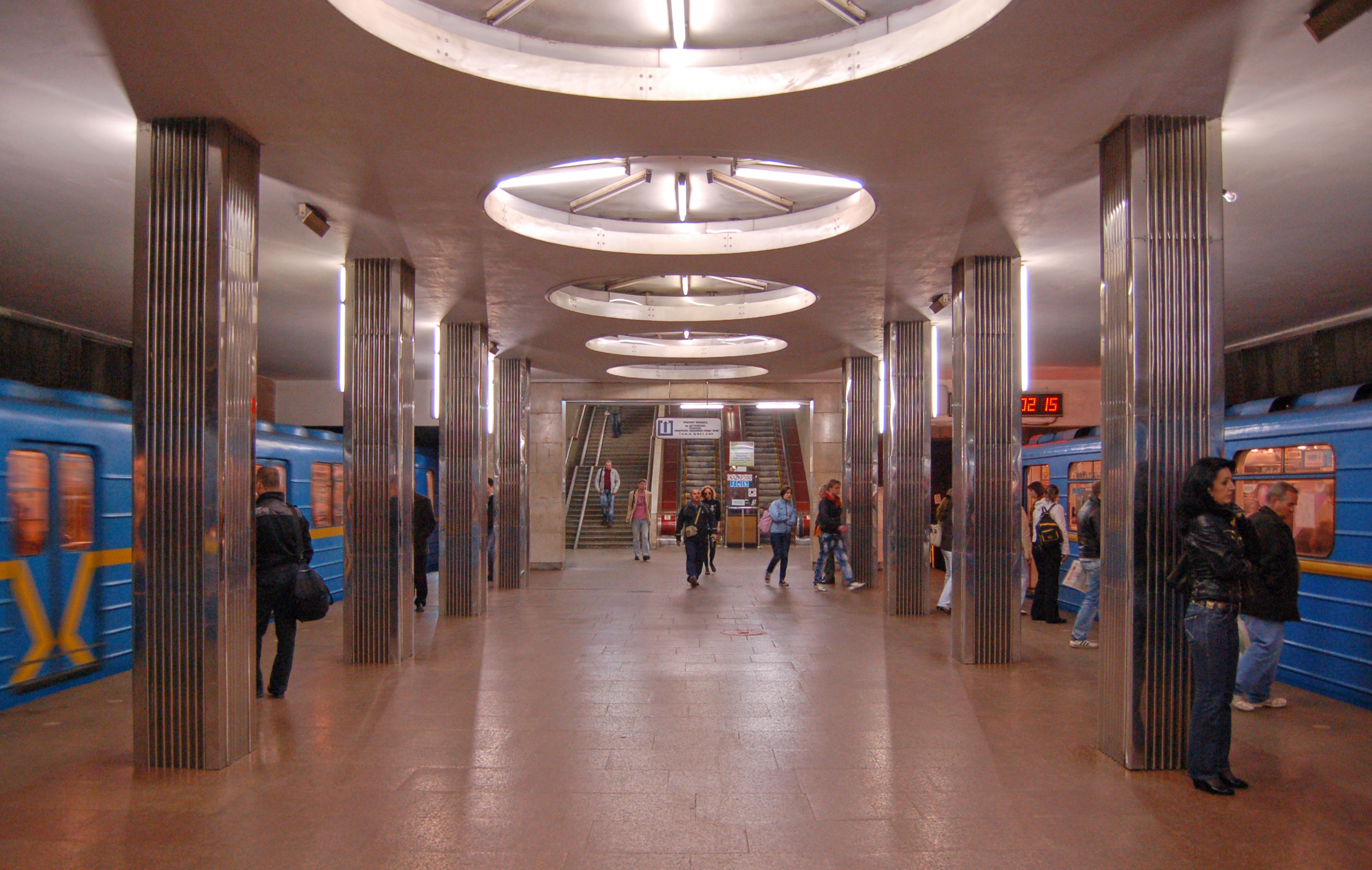
Central hall

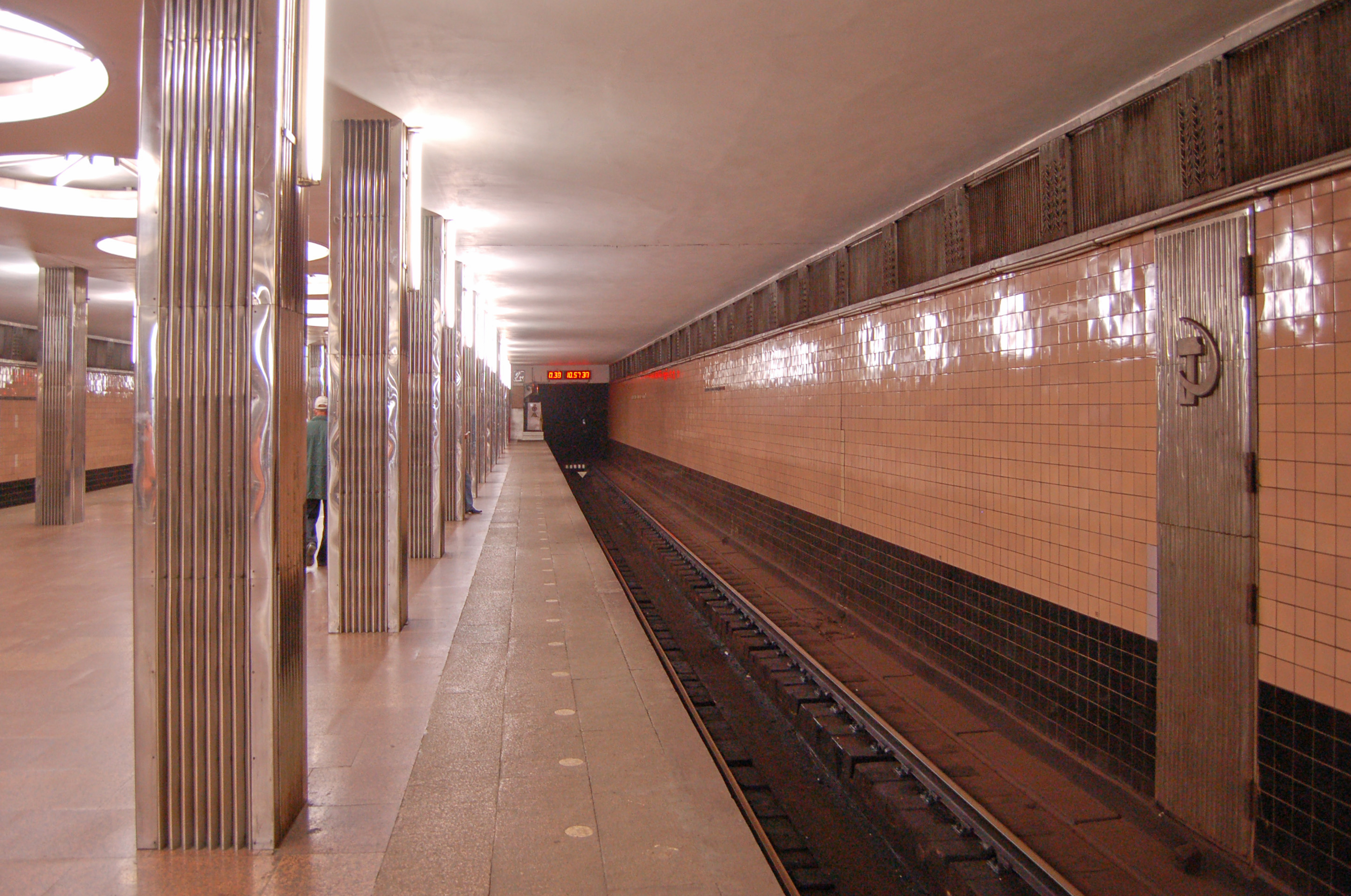
Station platform

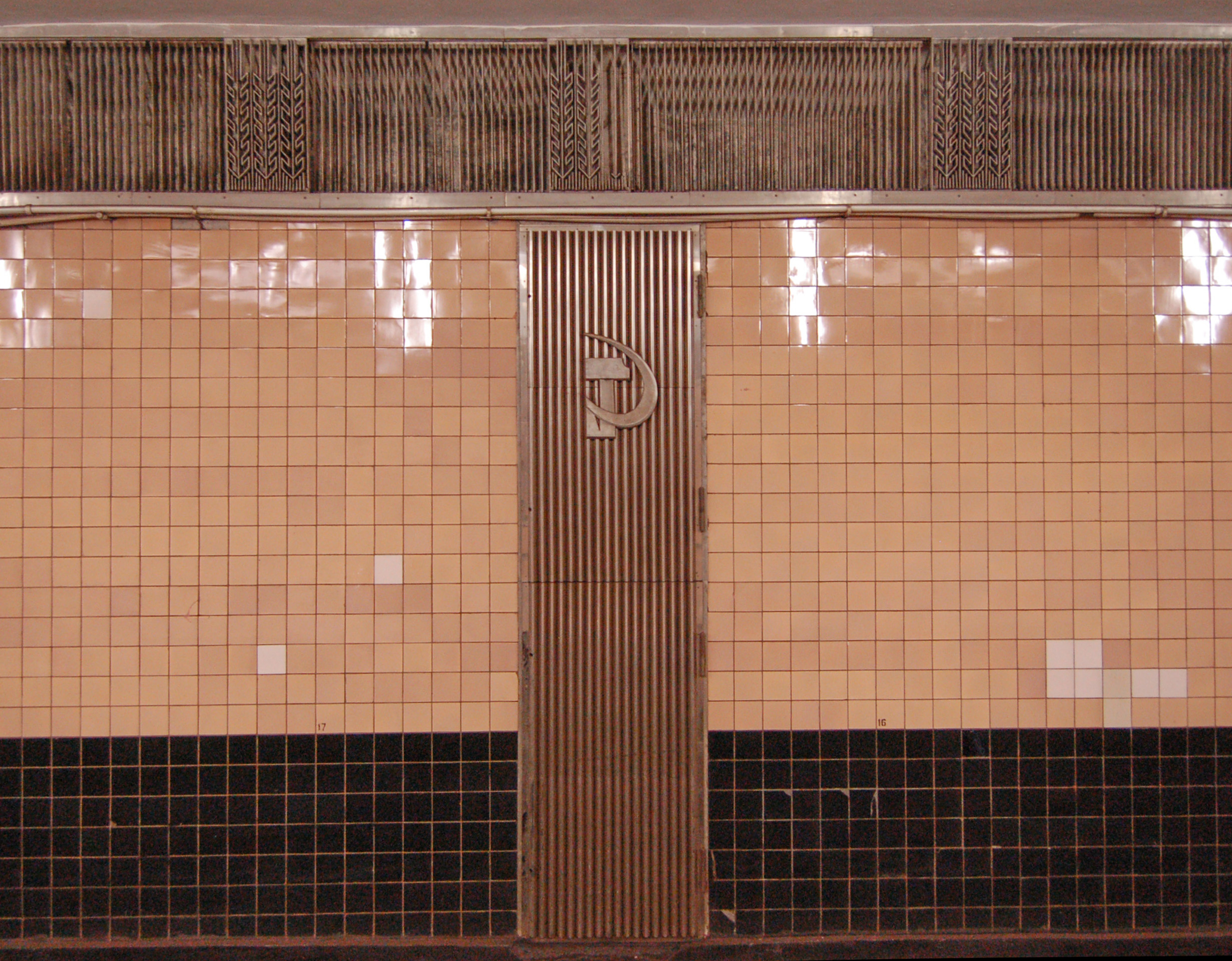
The decoration door on the wall of the track; the pictured hammer and sickle is due to be removed due to 2015 decommunization laws

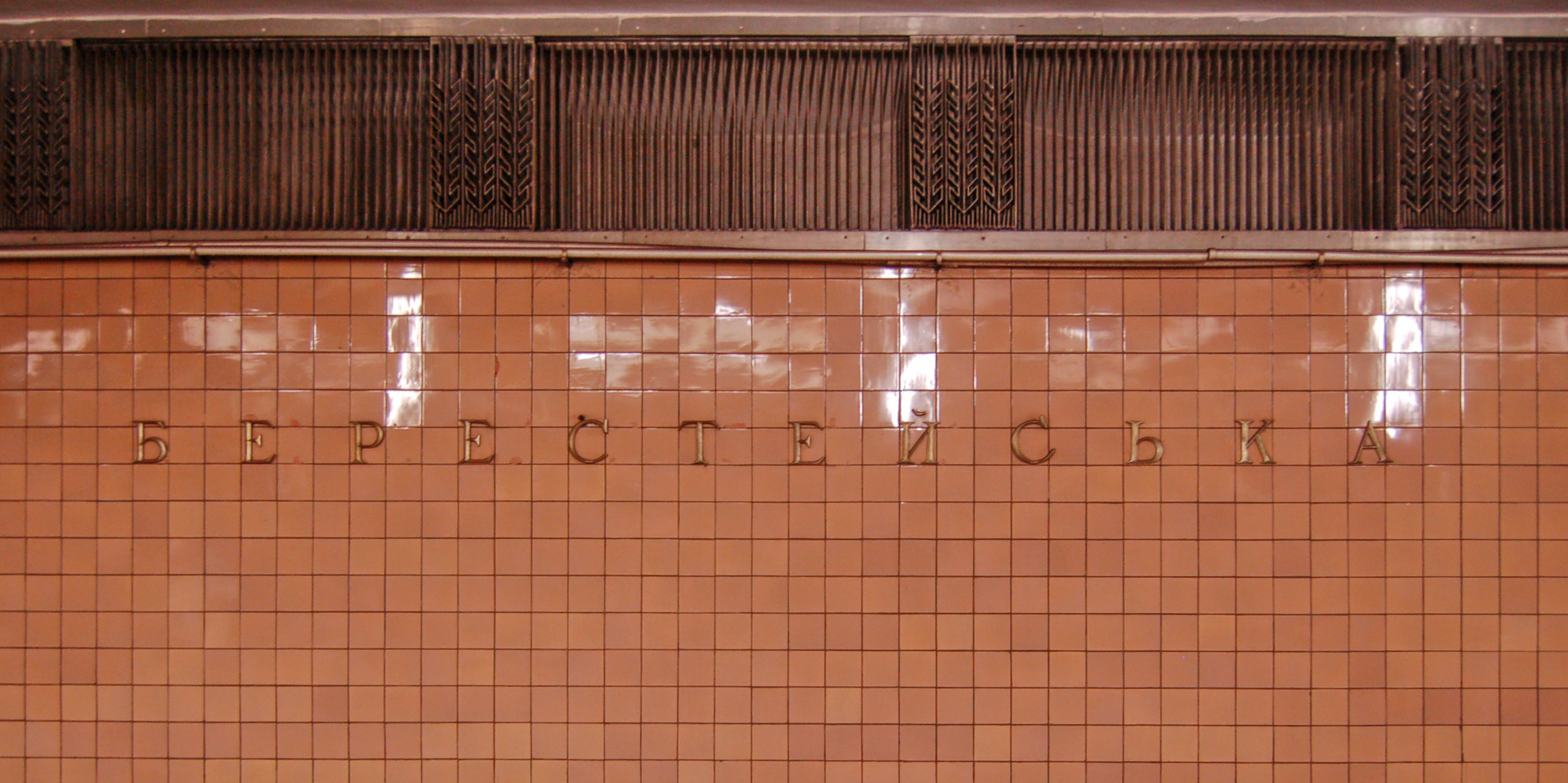
The name of station on the wall of the track
