= Vokzalna (Kyiv Metro) =

Kyiv Metro Station

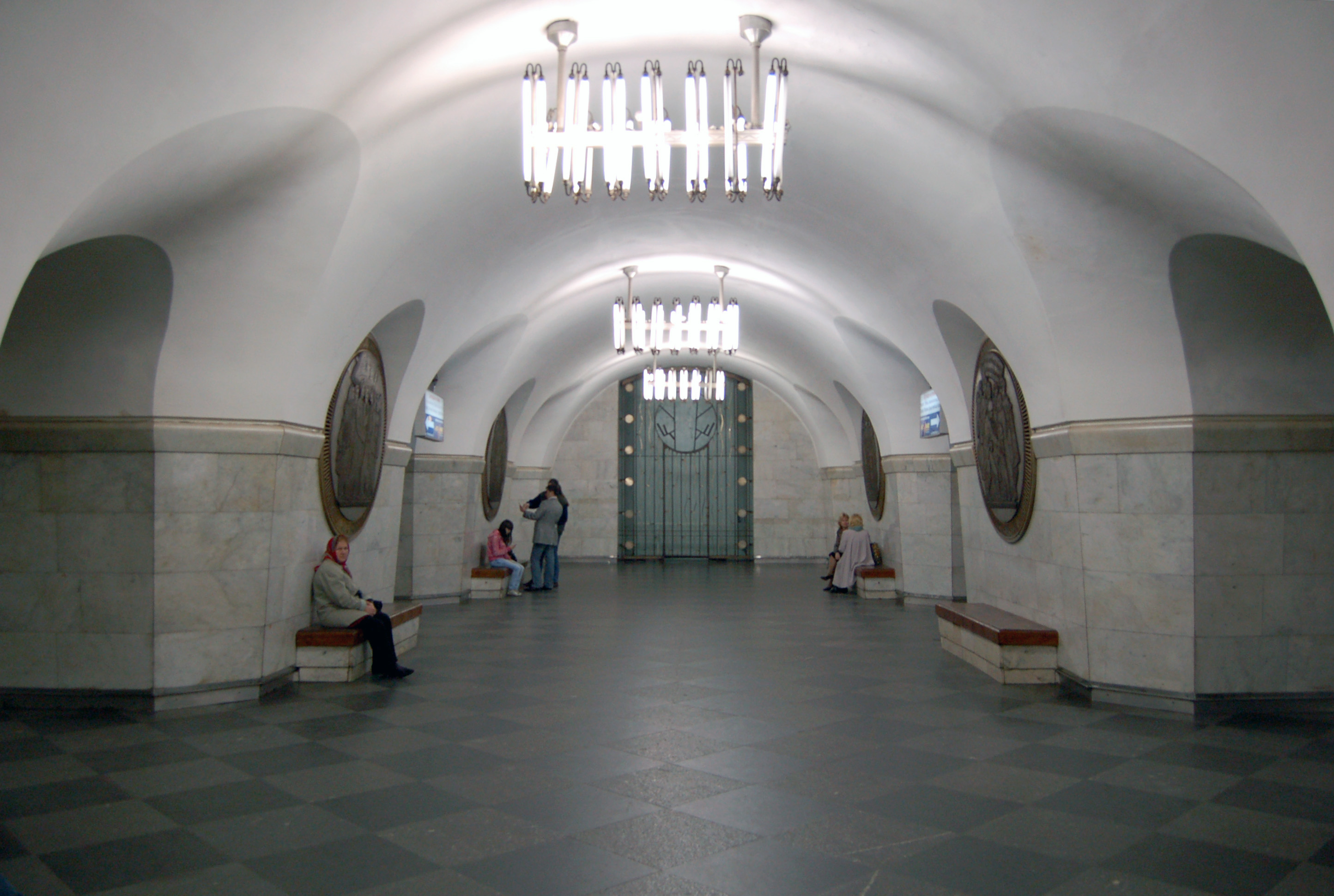
- The Station Hall

General information
- Location: Solomianskyi District; Kyiv; Ukraine
- Coordinates: 50°26′30″N 30°29′17″E
- System: Kyiv Metro station
- Owner: Kyiv Metro
- Line: Sviatoshynsko–Brovarska line
- Platforms: 1
- Tracks: 2

Construction
- Structure type: underground
- Depth: 42 m (138 ft)
- Platform levels: 1

Other information
- Station code: 117

History
- Opened: 6 November 1960

Passengers
- 120.000

Services
Preceding station	Kyiv Metro	Following station
Politekhnichnyi Instytut towards Akademmistechko	Sviatoshynsko–Brovarska line	Universytet towards Lisova

Immovable Monument of Local Significance of Ukraine
- Official name: Станція метро «Вокзальна» (Vokzalna metro station)
- Type: Architecture
- Reference no.: 3270-Кв
Location

Vokzalna (Ukrainian: Вокзальна,) is a station on Kyiv Metro's Sviatoshynsko-Brovarska Line, in the Ukrainian capital Kyiv. The station was opened along with the Metro on 6 November 1960 and is named after Kyiv's Central rail station (Vokzal).

Decoratively the station is reminiscent of the 1950s stations seen in Moscow Metro, particularly VDNKh. To justify the name of a main railway terminal and thus as a gateway to the system and to Kyiv the architects (V. Yezhov, E. Katonyn, V. Skyharov, I. Shemsedinov, A. Dobrovolsky and I. Maslenkov) took a pylon trivault design with bright white marbled pylons and white ceramic tiles on the walls. Lighting comes from square chandeliers suspended from the apex of the vault. In the far end of the station is a bronze grill that used to have a large image of Lenin. The pylons are decorated with bronze medallions depicting the various episodes from Ukrainian and Soviet history (artist O. Mizin). In May 2016 it was planned they would be removed, due to 2015 decommunization laws, and relocated to a museum. They decorations kept being displayed, until on 15 November 2023 they were covered with wooden shields. It was a temporary solution until a future completely dismantling of all Bolshevik and Soviet symbols and elements.

The station has the status of an architectural monument.

The station's round vestibule is part of a larger structure which contains platforms leaving to the commuter trains. On 16 August 2006, the Construction Committee of Kyiv approved plans for a second exit to open on the opposite side of the railway station with access to the southern terminal. The station is also planned to serve as a future transfer to Podilsko-Vyhurivska line, past unfulfilled planning envisioned Pivdennyi Vokzal (Vokzalna-II) to have opened after 2030.
