= Khreshchatyk (Kyiv Metro) =

Kyiv Metro Station

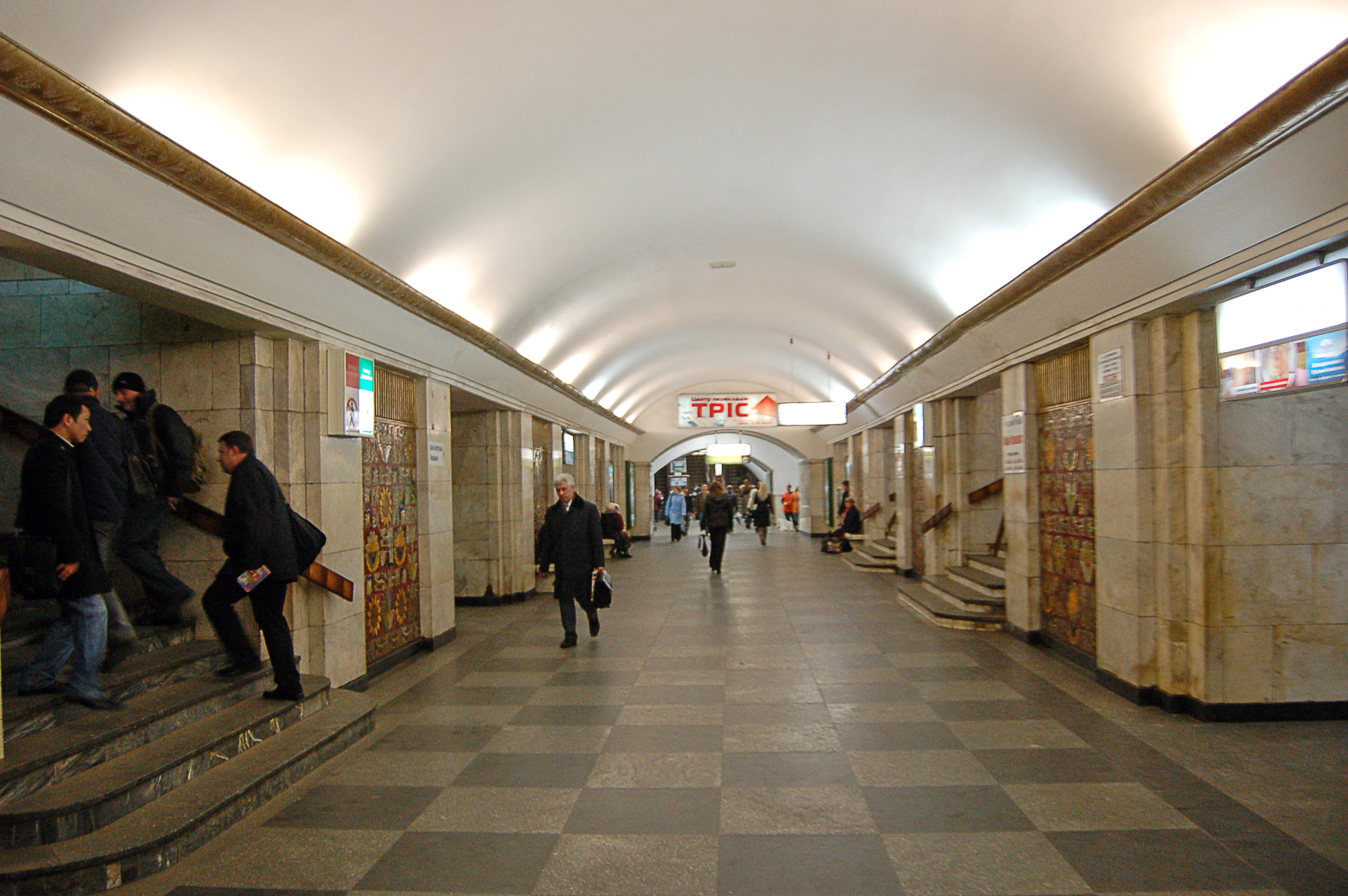
- The Station Hall

General information
- Location: Pecherskyi District; Kyiv; Ukraine
- Coordinates: 50°26′50″N 30°31′22″E
- System: Kyiv Metro station
- Owner: Kyiv Metro
- Line: Sviatoshynsko–Brovarska line
- Platforms: 1
- Tracks: 2

Construction
- Structure type: underground
- Platform levels: 1

Other information
- Station code: 120

History
- Opened: 6 November 1960

Services
Preceding station	Kyiv Metro	Following station
Teatralna towards Akademmistechko	Sviatoshynsko–Brovarska line	Arsenalna towards Lisova
Ploshcha Ukrainskykh Heroiv towards Heroiv Dnipra	Obolonsko–Teremkivska line transfer at Maidan Nezalezhnosti	Poshtova Ploshcha towards Teremky
Location

Khreshchatyk (Ukrainian: Хрещатик,) is a station on the Sviatoshynsko-Brovarska Line of the Kyiv Metro system that serves Kyiv, the capital city of Ukraine. The station is named for the Khreshchatyk street, the most central street in Kyiv. The station was opened in 1960 along with the first stage of the Metro. It The station is pylon trivault (architects Yu.Tyahno and I.Maslenkov) that features ceramic Ukrainian ornaments framed by metallic grills on the central hall sides of the pylons. White marble is used elsewhere, particularly for the walls and the main pylon frames. The ceiling is covered in white plaster and lighting comes from hidden lamps in the niches of the central vault and a central row of lamps.

In 1976, the station became the first transfer point in the system to the newly opened Obolonsko–Teremkivska Line's (then named Kurenivsko-Chervonoarmiiska Line) Maidan Nezalezhnosti (then called Ploshcha Kalinina but soon renamed to Ploshcha Zhovtnevoi Revoliutsii). The stations are connected side to side with staircases and an escalator. The original corridor, however, proved to be too short and unable to cope with rising passenger traffics and in 1986 a second, longer corridor connected the opposite sides of the stations allowing traffic to be diverted. In the future, the longer corridor is planned to be fitted with travelator, speeding up the passenger flow in the longer corridor.

The station has two vestibules, the first one is built into a restaurant building (now occupied by a shop) on Khreshchatyk Street. The second one was opened in 1963 (replacing a large coat of arms of the Ukrainian SSR) and is located on the corner of Instituska and Horodetska streets.

Behind the station is a set of reversal sidings that continue as a single track service branch into the Obolonsko–Teremkivska Line and the Syretsko-Pecherska Line. This is the main artery that is used for interline transit between depots and lines. As well as for nighttime stands.

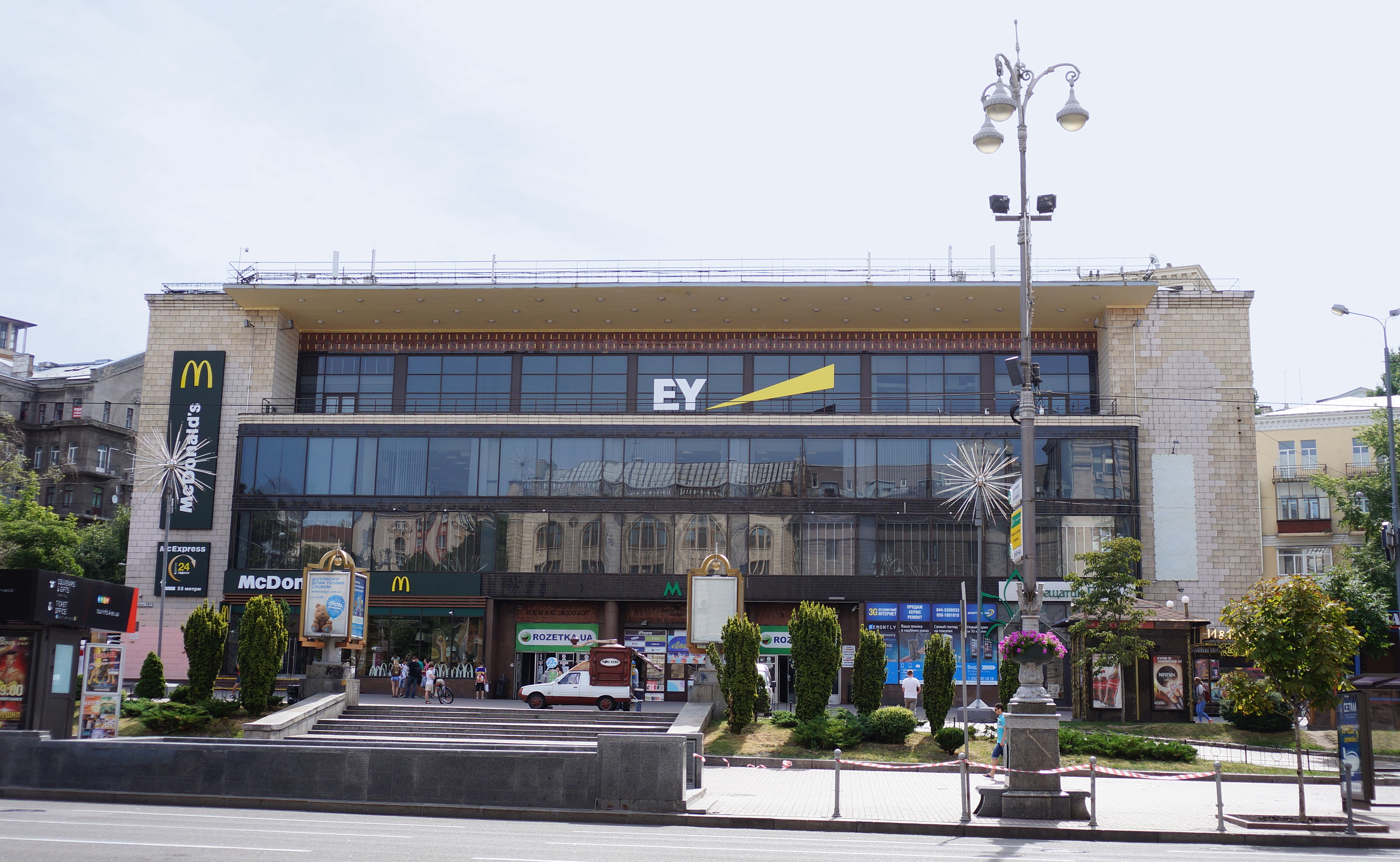
Entrance on the Khreshchatyk Street

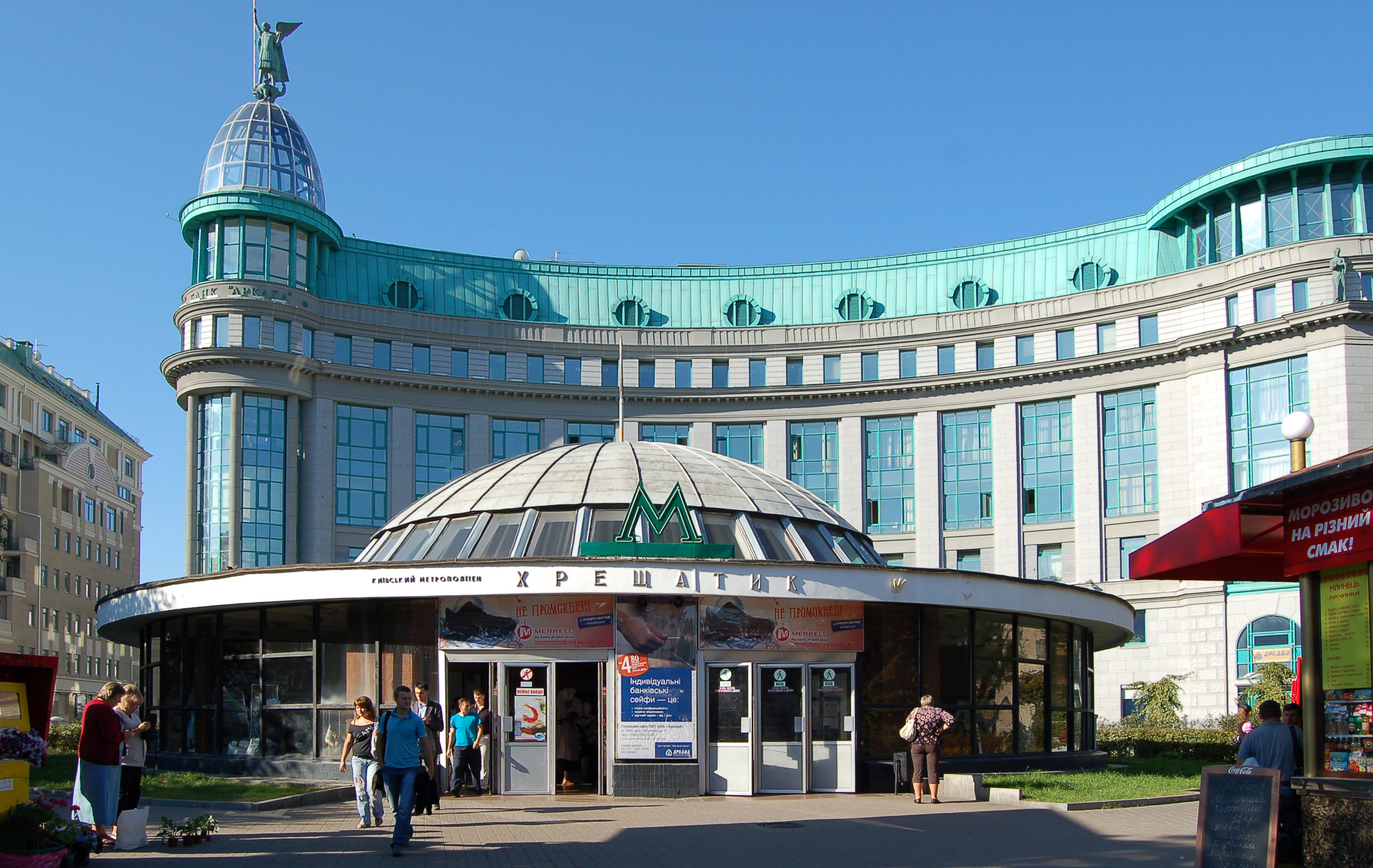
Entrance on the corner of Instytutska and Olhynska Streets
