= Darnytsia (Kyiv Metro) =

Kyiv Metro Station

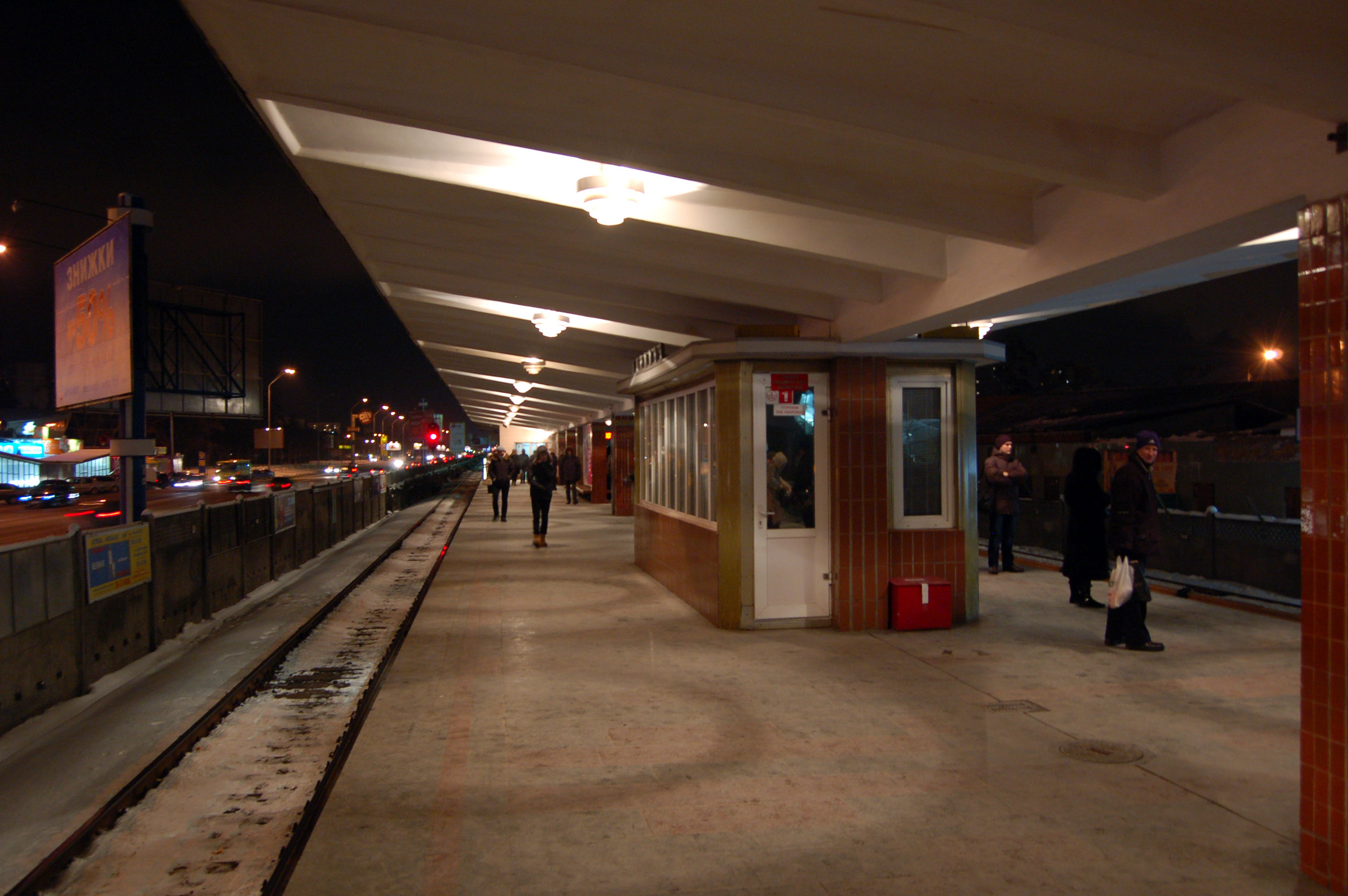

General information
- Location: Dniprovskyi District; Kyiv; Ukraine
- Coordinates: 50°27′20″N 30°36′48″E
- System: Kyiv Metro station
- Owner: Kyiv Metro
- Line: Sviatoshynsko–Brovarska line
- Platforms: 1
- Tracks: 2

Construction
- Structure type: surface platform
- Platform levels: 1

Other information
- Station code: 125

History
- Opened: 5 November 1965

Services
Preceding station	Kyiv Metro	Following station
Livoberezhna towards Akademmistechko	Sviatoshynsko–Brovarska line	Chernihivska towards Lisova
Location

Darnytsia (Ukrainian: Дарниця,) is a station on the Kyiv Metro's Sviatoshynsko-Brovarska Line. It was opened on 5 November 1965 as part of the westwards eastwards expansion of the Brovary radius and is the second station located fully on the left bank of the Dnipro River. It's named after the historic neighborhood of Kyiv, Darnytsia.

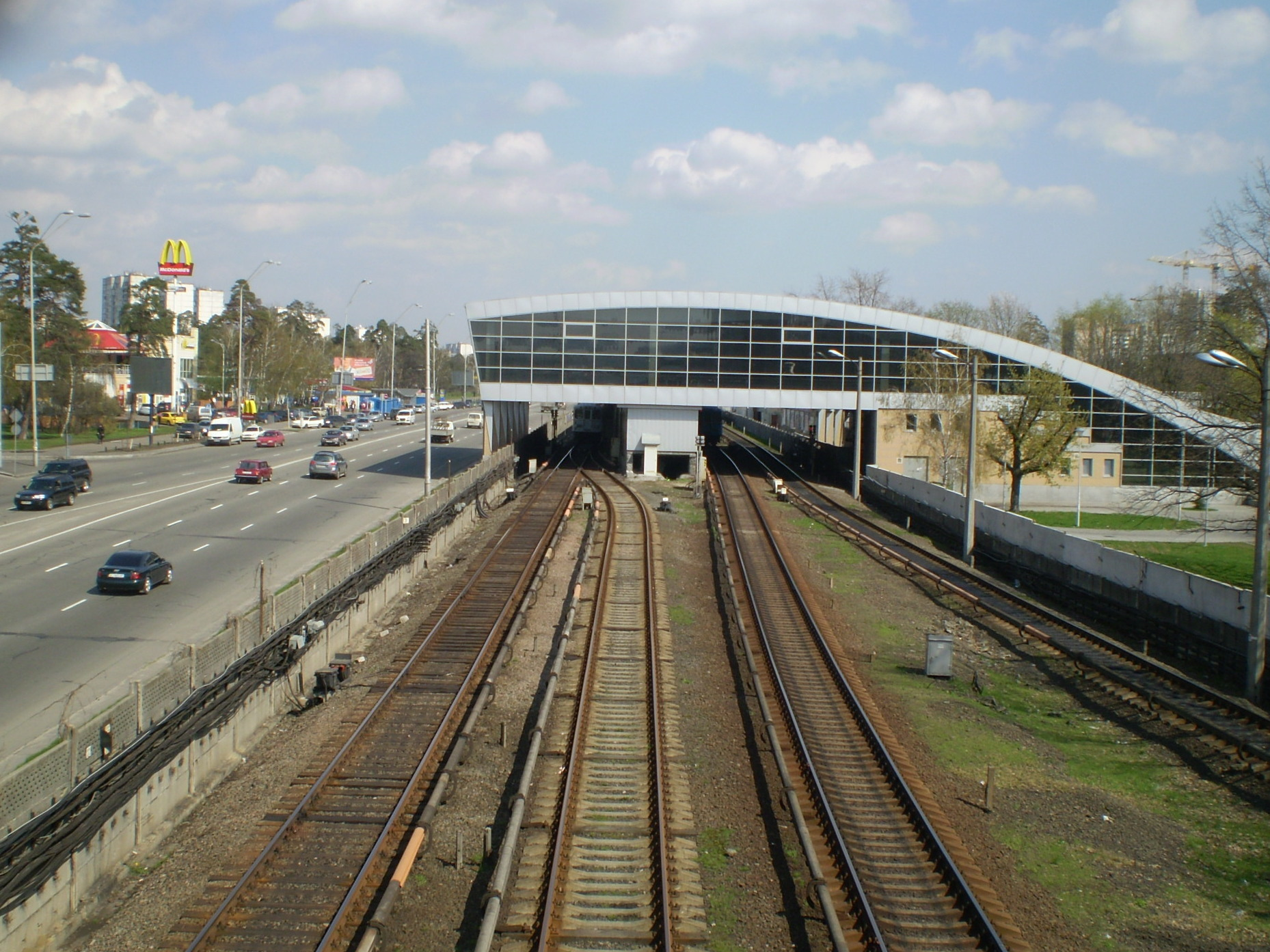
Vestibule at the western entrance

Designed by architects I. Maslenkov and V. Bogdanovsky, the station presents itself as a simple surface platform with a pillar-supported concrete canopy, a design that is almost identical to the three other stations that opened along with it and typical for the 1960s public architecture. Originally a terminus, not far from the station is the "Darnytsia" depot which was the first fully operational metro depot in Kyiv, and also served the Obolonsko–Teremkivska Line from 1976 until 1982 when the "Obolon" depot opened.

The Darnytsia station is located on the edge of a large park and on the Brovary Avenue. Originally the station had only one entrance through a pedestrian underpass at the eastern end. The western overpass exit was built in 2006. This was necessary as the station is one of the busiest on the radius due to the large amount of land transport coming from the northern left-bank districts and the local shopping center of Darnytsia.
