= Chernihivska =

Chernihivska (Ukrainian: Чернігівська) is a Ukrainian name. It may refer to:

- Chernihivska (Kyiv Metro), a station on the Kyiv Metro
- Chernihivska Oblast of Ukraine
