= Darnytsia (disambiguation) =

Darnytsia (Ukrainian: Дарниця) is a widely found Ukrainian geographical name, which would most often stand for:

- Darnytsia, a historical neighbourhood of Ukraine's capital Kyiv
  - Darnytskyi District, an administrative district of Kyiv
  - Darnytsia, a river in Kyiv
  - Darnytsia Railway Station, a large railway station in Kyiv
  - Darnytsia (Kyiv Metro), a metro station on the Sviatoshynsko-Brovarska Line of the Kyiv Metro
  - Darnytsia, a Kyiv metro-depot
  - Darmytsia, a bus station
  - Darnytsia Pharmaceutical Company CJSC, a major pharmaceutical company in Kyiv
  - BG-116 Darnytsia, a ship of the Ukrainian Sea Guard,

- all named particularly after Kyiv's neighborhood.

- Darnytsia, a village in Hannivka community, Voznesensk Raion, Mykolaiv Oblast
