= Chernihivska (Kyiv Metro) =

Kyiv Metro Station

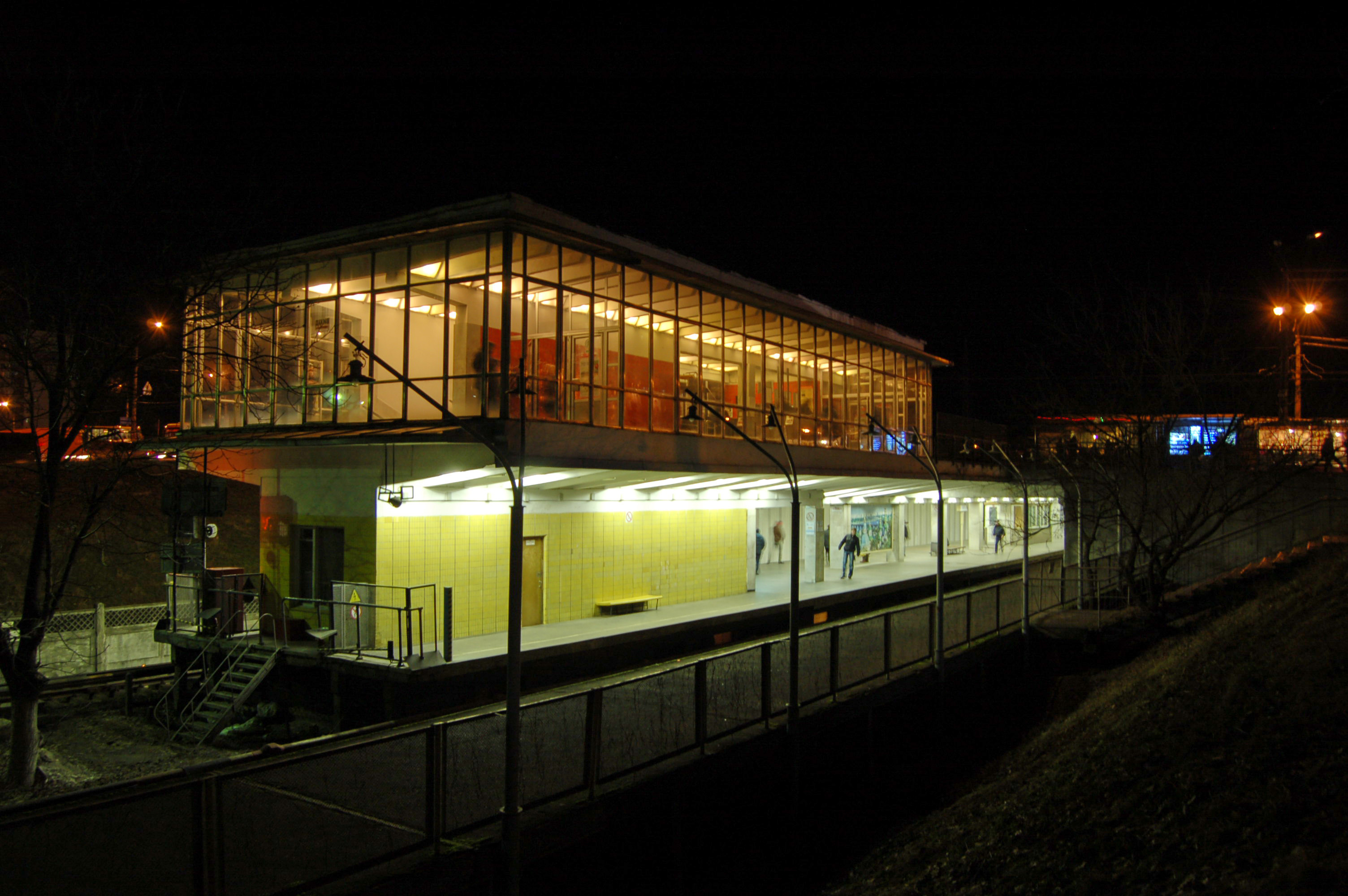

General information
- Location: Desnianskyi District; Dniprovskyi District; Kyiv; Ukraine
- Coordinates: 50°27′36″N 30°37′51″E
- System: Kyiv Metro station
- Owner: Kyiv Metro
- Line: Sviatoshynsko–Brovarska line
- Platforms: 2
- Tracks: 2

Construction
- Structure type: surface platform
- Platform levels: 1

Other information
- Station code: 126

History
- Opened: 4 November 1968
- Former names: Komsomolska

Services
Preceding station	Kyiv Metro	Following station
Darnytsia towards Akademmistechko	Sviatoshynsko–Brovarska line	Lisova Terminus
Location

Chernihivska (Ukrainian: Чернiгiвська,) is a station on the Sviatoshynsko-Brovarska Line of the Kyiv Metro system that serves Kyiv, the capital of Ukraine. The station was built as a single extension to the newer housing massifs built on the eastern edge of Kyiv.

Located next to the intersection of Brovary Avenue and Bratislava Street, it is a surface station built to the identical design that was popular throughout the Soviet Union at the time, matching five stations on the Moscow Metro (such as Bagrationovskaya) and one on Tbilisi Metro (Dibube).

Chernihivska's design (architects I. Maslenikov, V. Bogdanovskaya, T. Tselikovskaya) consists of two levels, a lower platform level and an upper street level. The latter is made with two square glazed vestibules standing opposite a road flyover that crosses perpendicular to the platform alignment. As a result, on the platform level there is no canopy as such; however, the need for the support of the structure requires a span of pillars on the centreline that are faced with white marble, and a fake canopy bottom adjoins from the top. Apart from the black granite on the platform, that is the only decoration used. However to avoid the station creating a gloomy nighttime appearance both the "ceilings" of the station are painted white.

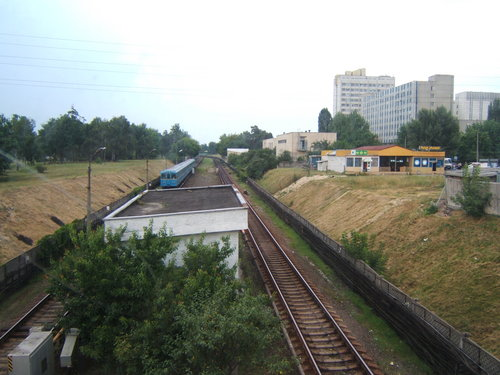
Westward view

In Kyiv this was the first time such a design was required, and also the last time, because when the station was opened on 4 November 1968, the state requirement for aesthetic functionality designs with little or no decorative architecture had already passed, and the cost-saving surface station approach was abandoned in favour of returning to standard underground designs.

One unique feature of the station is that it has a second platform for eastbound trains. When the station was the line's terminus, this was used for quicker unloading of passengers who were traveling from the centre to save the congestion in the small vestibules during peak hours (which were operating entry only). However, after the extension to Lisova in 1979, the passenger traffic fell rapidly and this arrangement was discontinued, although the platform itself remains.

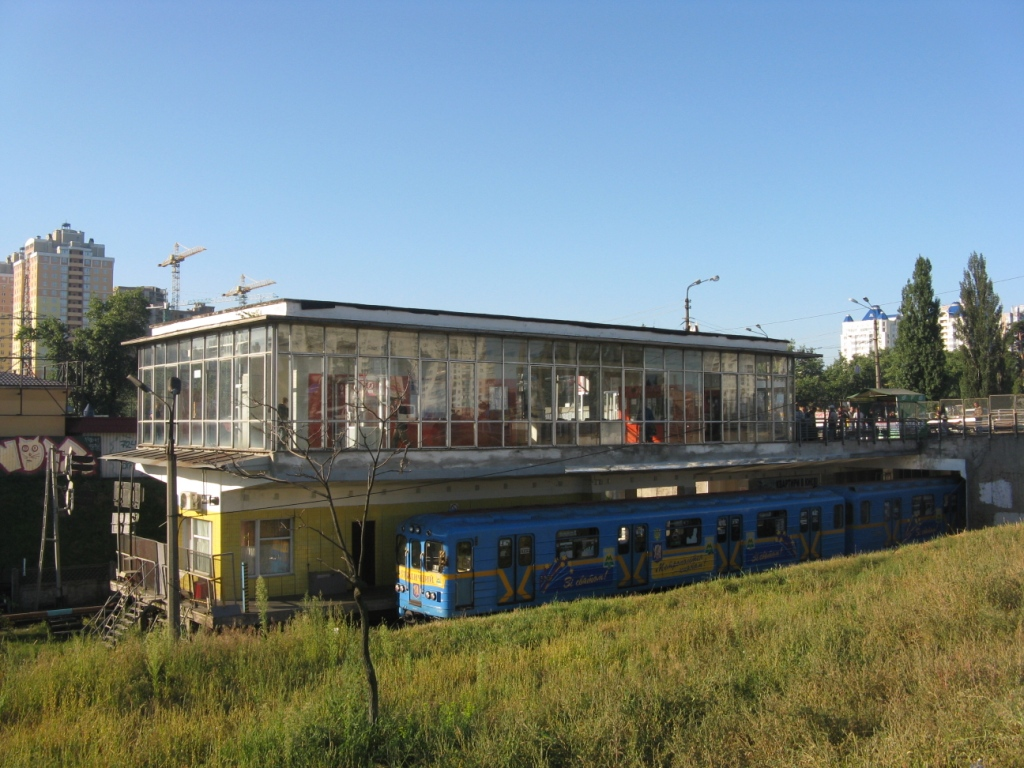

The station is named after the city of Chernihiv, because the Brovary Avenue then continues out of Kyiv as the E101 motorway towards that city. Originally, however, the station was called Komsomolska (Ukrainian: Комсомольська, Russian: Комсомольская, romanized: Komsomolskaya) after the Communist Youth League that played an important role in Soviet society. After the Independence of Ukraine in 1991, the station was renamed due to the old name becoming obsolete after the League was disbanded.
