= Dniprovskyi District, Kyiv =

Dniprovskyi District Дніпровський район
- Urban district in Kyiv
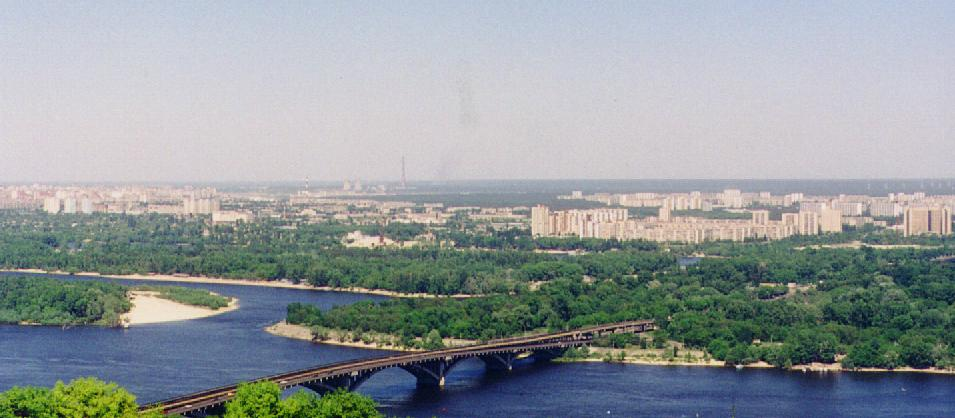
- View of the left-bank Kyiv and the Dnipro River. Background high-rise buildings in the right are in the Dniprovskyi Raion.

- Flag Coat of arms

- Interactive map of Dniprovskyi District
- Coordinates: 50°27′00″N 30°31′24″E
- Country: Ukraine
- Municipality: Kyiv
- Established: 23 May 1969

Government
  - Governor: Ihor Shcherbak

Area
  - Total: 67 km^{2} (26 sq mi)

Population (1 January 2021)
  - Total: 357,900
  - Density: 5,300/km^{2} (14,000/sq mi)
- Time zone: UTC+2 (EET)
  - Summer (DST): UTC+3 (EEST)
- Postal code: 02094
- Area code: +380 44
- KOATUU code: 8036600000
- Metro stations: Hydropark, Livoberezhna, Darnytsia, Chernihivska
- Website: dnipr.kyivcity.gov.ua

The Dniprovskyi District (Note: Ukrainian: Дніпровський район, romanized: Dniprovskyi raion) is an urban district of the city of Kyiv, the capital of Ukraine. It is named after the Dnipro River and is located on its left-bank.

== Geography ==
The Dniprovskyi District's area consists of a total of 67 km^{2} (26 mi^{2}), which is approximately 8 percent of the city's total area.

== Population ==
=== Language ===
Distribution of the population by native language according to the 2001 census:

Language	Number	Percentage
Ukrainian	236 342	71.90%
Russian	89 082	27.10%
Other (Note: Those who did not indicate their native language or indicated a language that was native to less than 1% of the local population.)	3 301	1.00%
Total	328 725	100.00%

== History ==
On 23 May 1969, the Dniprovskyi District was established out of a portion of the city's Darnytskyi District based on a decree of the Presidium of the Verkhovna Rada of the Ukrainian Soviet Socialist Republic. In 2026 amidst the Russo-Ukrainian war, a shootout occurred in the area between the SBU and the HRU, when the SBU arrested the deputy leader of the Russian Volunteer Corps and the HRU attempted to prevent this.

== See also ==
- Subdivisions of Kyiv
