= Sviatoshynsko–Brovarska line =

Kyiv Metro line

Sviatoshynsko-Brovarska line

Overview
- Locale: Kyiv, Ukraine
- Termini: Akademmistechko; Lisova
- Stations: 18

Service
- Type: Rapid transit
- System: Kyiv Metro
- Operator: Kyivskyi Metropoliten

History
- Opened: 6 November 1960; 66 years ago
- Last extension: 2003

Technical
- Line length: 22.64 km (14.07 mi)
- Track gauge: 1,520 mm (4 ft 11 27/32 in)
- Electrification: 750 V DC (third rail)

The Sviatoshynsko–Brovarska line (Ukrainian: Святошинсько-Броварська лінія) is the first line of the Kyiv Metro, dating back to 1960. Informarly, it is known as the Red line (Ukrainian: червона, chervona). It includes some of the system's more historically significant stations, such as Arsenalna, which at 105.5 meters is the deepest in the world and the next station Dnipro, which although the tunnel follows a descent, appears above ground level.

All of the stations on the eastern bank of the Dnieper River are either ground-level or above ground level; this is attributed to a similar experiment like Moscow's Filyovskaya line. Here, the warmer Ukrainian climate prevented the stations there from deteriorating severely, which is why extensions in 1968 and 1979 were kept from going underground. The five original stations are extremely beautiful in architecture and decoration as they managed to survive Nikita Khrushchev's struggle with decorative "extras".

The Svyatoshynsko–Brovarska line cuts Kyiv on an east–west axis and presently comprises 18 stations. It is usually coloured red on the maps.

== History ==
Construction began in 1949, with the first station, Vokzalna, located near the Kyiv-Pasazhyrskyi railway station. Vozalna is a relative adjective for a railway station building known as Vokzal. The first segment, consisting of five (5) stations, was completed on 6 November 1960. It stretched from the main railway station towards the Dnieper River. In 1963, two more stations were completed in the opposite direction (west). In 1965, the line stretched over the Dnieper onto the Left Bank and included three stations, two bridges, and a depot. In 1968, it extended even further east.

=== Timeline ===
Segment	Date opened	Length
Vokzalna–Dnipro	November 6, 1960	5.24 km
Vokzalna–Shuliavska	November 5, 1963	3.24 km
Dnipro–Darnytsia	November 5, 1965	4.15 km
Darnytsia–Chernihivska	November 4, 1968	1.32 km
Shuliavska–Sviatoshyn	November 5, 1971	4.23 km
Chernihivska–Lisova	December 5, 1979	1.22 km
Teatralna	November 6, 1987	N/A
Sviatoshyn–Akademmistechko	May 24, 2003	3.25 km
Total:	18 stations	22.64 km

=== Name changes ===
The stations that were renamed were all renamed in the 1990s.

Station	Previous name(s)	Years
Sviatoshyn	Sviatoshyno	1971–1991
Beresteiska	Zhovtneva	1971–1993
Shuliavska	Zavod Bilshovyk	1963–1993
Teatralna	Leninska	1987–1993
Chernihivska	Komsomolska	1968–1993
Lisova	Pionerska	1979–1993

== Stations ==
1. Akademmistechko
2. Zhytomyrska
3. Sviatoshyn
4. Nyvky
5. Beresteiska
6. Shuliavska
7. Politekhnichnyi Instytut
8. Vokzalna
9. Universytet
10. Teatralna → Zoloti Vorota
11. Khreshchatyk → Maidan Nezalezhnosti
12. Arsenalna
13. Dnipro
14. Hidropark
15. Livoberezhna
16. Darnytsia
17. Chernihivska
18. Lisova

=== Transfers ===
Traditional Soviet metro planning stipulated the creation of the first line, which would at some point in the future be expanded and crossed by future planned lines. Specifically, the Sviatoshynsko–Brovarska line has two transfer stations, although a couple more are planned for connection to future perspective lines of the metro system:

#	Transfer to	At
	Obolonsko–Teremkivska line	Khreshchatyk
	Syretsko–Pecherska line	Teatralna

== Rolling stock ==
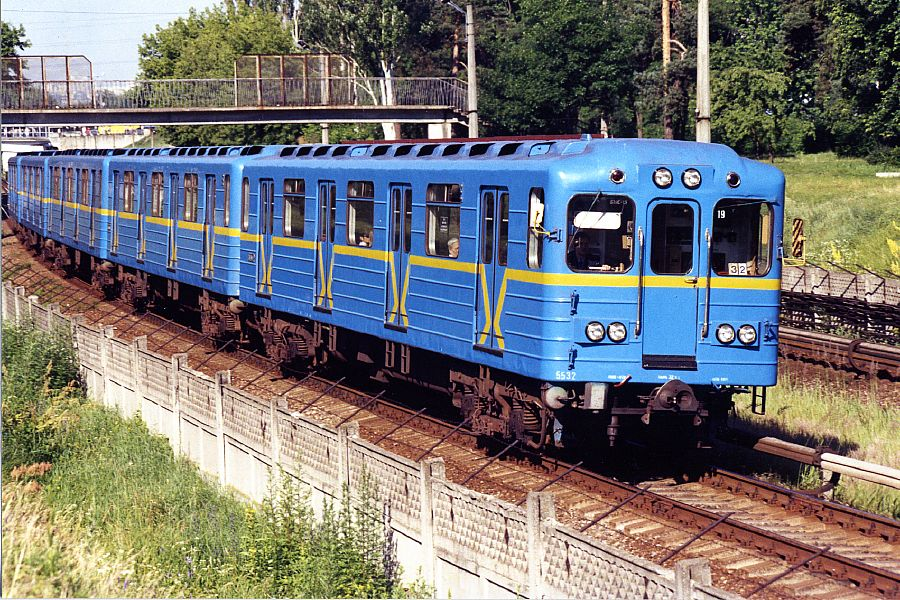
A modernised train of the E-family on the Sviatoshynsko–Brovarska line

The line is served by the Darnytsia depot (No. 1) although before 1965, a converted tram depot located under the Dnipro station was used. After the completion of the Metro Bridge, the depot was dismantled. Currently 28 five-carriage train sets are assigned to the line. Most of them are type E, Ezh, Ezh1, Em-501 and Ema-502 built during the late 1960s and the early 1970s. The line was once served by carriages of type D, which were later given to Saint Petersburg metro. In 2014, some of the trains were refurbished and converted into type 81-7080/7081 or E-KM, with new engines, interior and exterior.

== Future plans ==
Since the line has the oldest stations in the system, some show heavy marks from nearly half a century of exploitation and need for renovations. This includes replacement of escalators, lighting and in some cases the decoration. In particular, this concerns the surface stations which are exposed to weather elements. One of these, Darnytsia, which in the future is to become an important transfer station for three lines, has recently undergone a complete reconstruction, with an addition of a new western entrance.

Other projects include additional new entrances for Vokzalna and a planned one for Teatralna.
