= Lisova (Kyiv Metro) =

Kyiv Metro Station

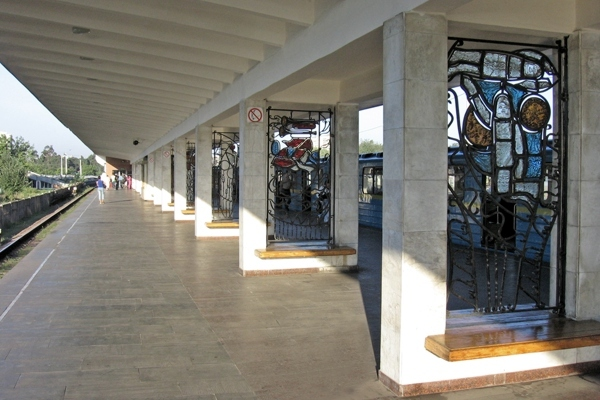
- Station platform

General information
- Location: Desnianskyi District, Kyiv; Ukraine
- Coordinates: 50°27′52″N 30°38′42″E
- System: Kyiv Metro
- Line: Sviatoshynsko–Brovarska line
- Platforms: 1
- Tracks: 2

Construction
- Structure type: surface platform
- Platform levels: 1

Other information
- Station code: 127

History
- Opened: 5 December 1979
- Former names: Pionerska

Services
Preceding station	Kyiv Metro	Following station
Chernihivska towards Akademmistechko	Sviatoshynsko–Brovarska line	Terminus
Location

Lisova (Ukrainian: Лісова,) is the terminus station of the Sviatoshynsko-Brovarska Line on the Kyiv Metro system that serves Kyiv, the capital of Ukraine. It opened on 5 December 1979. It is also the last surface station in Kyiv.

The extension to Lisova was built for reasons of Chernihivska's 1960s design proving incapable of handling mass crowds as a terminus, rather than the systematic expansion of Kyiv eastwards.

Although for ease of construction the station was built on the surface, its architectural composition is nonetheless significantly different from the surface stations that precede it. The architecture (work of I.Maslenikov, T.Tselikovskaya, A.Krushinsky, N.Chuprina and others) feature innovations such as using escalators for ascending from an underground subway onto the platform. Decorations to the station include two rows of white marble faced pillars and between them a series of metallic artworks with ceramic and glass fillings (work of I.Levitskaya, Yu.Kislichenko and A.Sharay). Red and grey granite is used for the floors. The overall theme of the station matches the nature and youth associations that the old name of the station Pionerska (Ukrainian: Пiонерська; Russian: Пионерская, Pionerska) after the Young Pioneer organization of the Soviet Union, like its previous neighbour Komsomolska, after the disestablishment of the organisation in 1991, the station was renamed after the Lisovyi microraion. The name roughly translates as the forest station and also fits the connotation of the rich forests that adjoin Kyiv from the east, not far from the station.

On 15 October 2005, a second entrance was opened to the station, built to similar layout as the first one, but with a more modern design, and with much larger passenger capacity handling. This helped the station deal with ever-increasing passenger traffics as it not only handles those from the neighbouring districts, but also those coming into Kyiv from the Kyiv Oblast.

Behind the station is a large service bay which acts as a mini-depot and can hold up to four trains. This is used for minor inspections and repairs. As well as night-time stands during the winter. At present, there is no extension foreseen in the future, as the station is located on the border between Kyiv Municipality and the Oblast. Nonetheless it is very possible that the city will continue to expand eastwards and thus in the more distant times another station might well be needed.
