= Akademmistechko (Kyiv Metro) =

Kyiv Metro Station

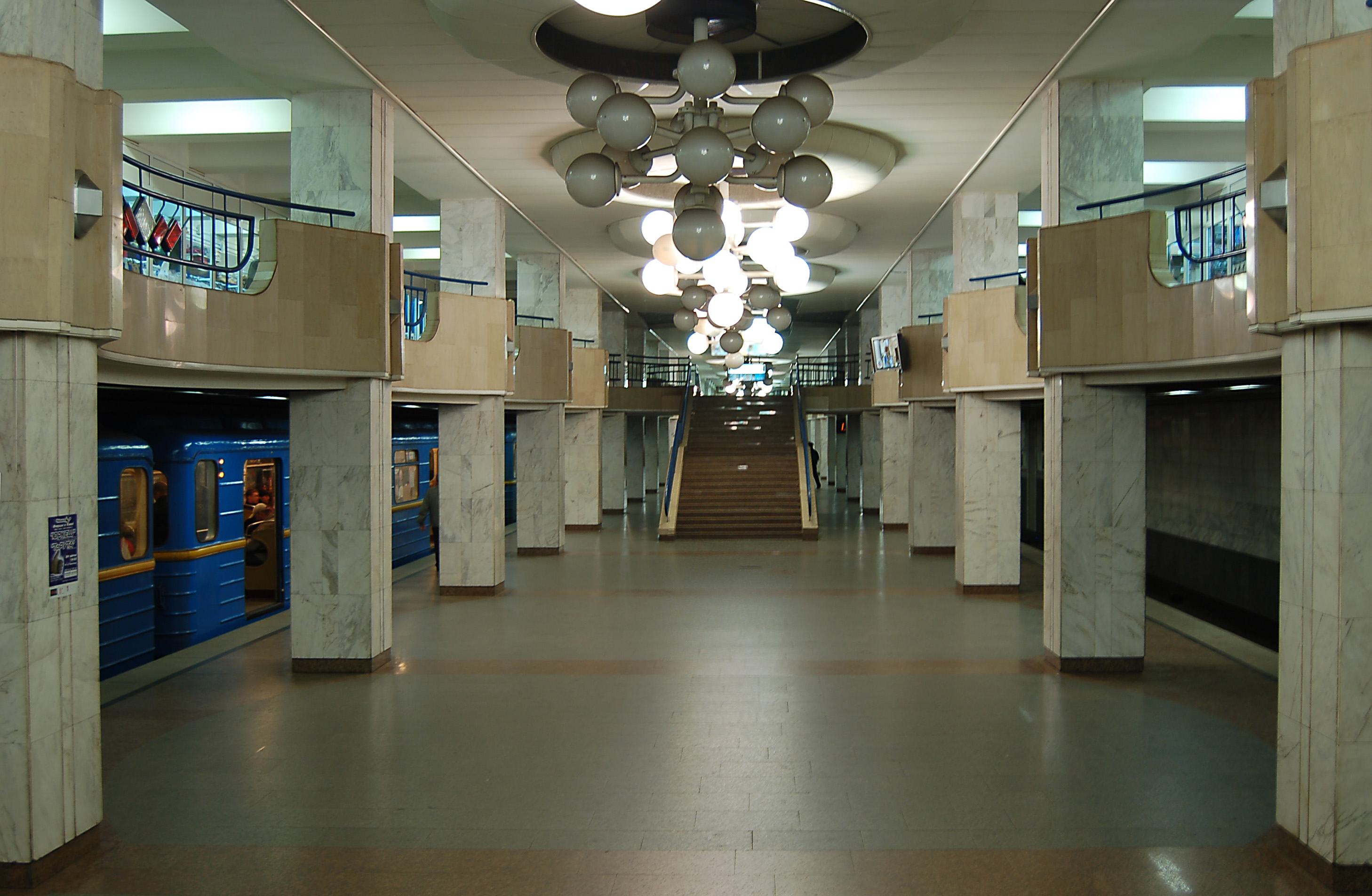

General information
- Location: Sviatoshynskyi District; Kyiv; Ukraine
- Coordinates: 50°27′56″N 30°21′18″E
- System: Kyiv Metro station
- Owner: Kyiv Metro
- Line: Sviatoshynsko–Brovarska line
- Platforms: 1
- Tracks: 2

Construction
- Structure type: underground
- Depth: 11 m (36 ft)
- Platform levels: 1

Other information
- Station code: 110

History
- Opened: 24 May 2003

Services
Preceding station	Kyiv Metro	Following station
Terminus	Sviatoshynsko–Brovarska line	Zhytomyrska towards Lisova
Location

Akademmistechko (Ukrainian: Академмiстечко,) is a station on the Sviatoshynsko-Brovarska Line of the Kyiv Metro system that serves Kyiv, the capital city of Ukraine. The station is the western terminus of the line and was opened on May 24, 2003 as part of the western extension of the Sviatoshynsky radius.

The station is a bi-level pillar-trispan, with two balconies on the top level. Named after the nearby laboratories (literally Academical town) of the Ukrainian Academy of Sciences, and test centres, the station's design (Architects V. Gnevyshev, Tamara Tselikovska, N. Aleshkin and S. Krushinsky) is based on scientific themes. The lighting for instance consists of several chandeliers, arranged in an organic element layout with the actual lamps acting as atoms. Overall the colour tone of the station is pale white from the marble used in coating with additional yellow tints on the hemispherical balconies and the staircases. Blue rails are used for the balcony details.

Unlike other stations on the radius, Akademmistechko does not follow the Beresteiskyi avenue but instead takes a northwards turn and is located near the intersection of Academican Palladin avenue and Academican Vernadsky boulevard. The area receives mostly local passengers, thus avoiding unnecessary congestion with non-Kyivans that come from outside of the city via Zhytomyrska.

The station has two vestibules which are interlinked with subways on both sides of the intersection. There is also a third staircase to the balcony level from the centre of the platform. On the surface, the entrances are protected from the elements by glazed pavilions. The segment Sviatoshyn–Akademmistechko completed the development plan of the Sviatoshynsky radius; no extensions are planned after this station.
