= List of Kyiv Metro stations =

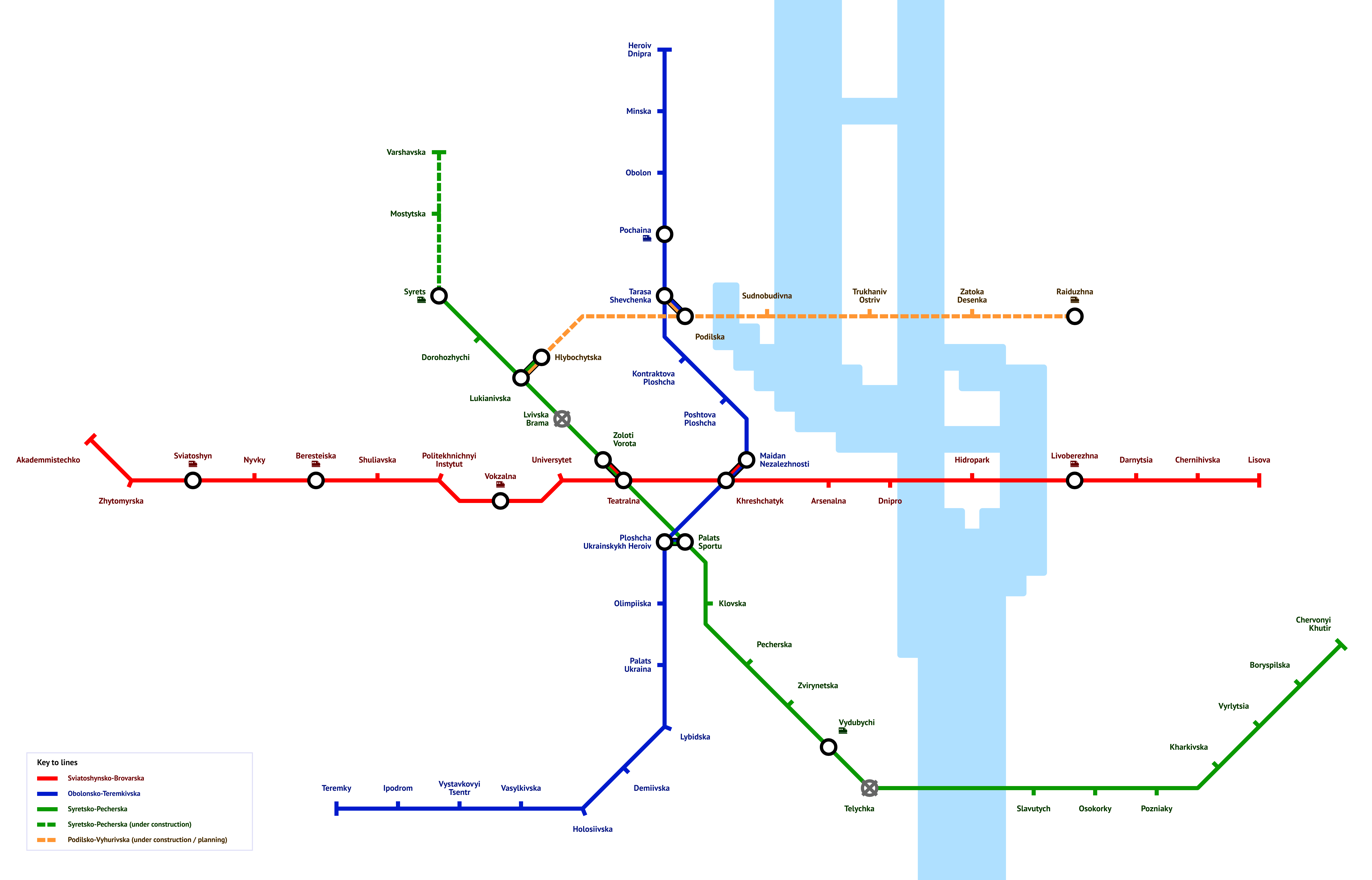
Map of the Kyiv Metro

The Kyiv Metro is the rapid transit system serving Kyiv, the capital of Ukraine, and its surrounding metropolitan area. The system is operated by the company Kyivskyi Metropoliten, a state-owned enterprise belonging to the Kyiv City Council, and serves Kyiv's ten urban districts, with bus and train connections to nearby locations in Kyiv Oblast and beyond. The system covers a total route length of 69,648 kilometres (43,277 mi), with three service lines and 52 stations. In 2021, Kyiv Metro had an annual ridership of 319.3 million people.

The first rapid transit system in Ukraine, the Kyiv Metro initially opened on 6 November 1960 as a single 5.24 km (3.26 mi) line with five stations. This original line was gradually expanded to become the current Sviatoshynsko–Brovarska line while two additional lines, Obolonsko–Teremkivska and Syretsko–Pecherska, were added in 1971 and 1989, respectively. A fourth line, Podilsko–Vyhurivska, is also planned.

At 105.5 m (346 ft 1.5 in) below ground level, Arsenalna station on the Sviatoshynsko-Brovarska Line is the second deepest metro station in the world after Hongyancun station in Chongqing.

== List of stations ==
^ Transfer station
† Line terminus
Railway station

Stations on the Kyiv Metro
| Name | Name (in Ukrainian) (Note: Links to Ukrainian Wikipedia articles for each station) | Image | Line | Opened | Type | Depth | Connections (Note: Bus, trolleybus, marshrutka, and non-rapid tram connections are not shown) |
|---|---|---|---|---|---|---|---|
| Akademmistechko† | Академмістечко | | Sviatoshynsko–Brovarska line (Note: In Ukrainian, Святошинсько-Броварська лінія) | 24 May 2003 | Shallow column | 11 m (36 ft) | |
| Zhytomyrska | Житомирська | | Sviatoshynsko–Brovarska line | 24 May 2003 | Single-vault | 10 m (33 ft) | |
| Sviatoshyn (Note: Known as Sviatoshyno (Святошино) from 1971 to 1991.) | Святошин | | Sviatoshynsko–Brovarska line | 5 November 1971 | Shallow column | 12 m (39 ft) | Kyiv City Express; Sviatoshyn railway station |
| Nyvky | Нивки | | Sviatoshynsko–Brovarska line | 5 November 1971 | Shallow column | 12.5 m (41 ft) | |
| Beresteiska (Note: Known as Zhovtneva (Жовтнева) from 1971 to 1993.) | Берестейська | | Sviatoshynsko–Brovarska line | 5 November 1971 | Shallow column | 11 m (36 ft) | Kyiv City Express; Beresteiska railway station |
| Shuliavska (Note: Known as Zavod Bilshovyk (Завод Більшовик) from 1963 to 1993.) | Шулявська | | Sviatoshynsko–Brovarska line | 5 November 1963 | Pylon | 92 m (302 ft) | |
| Politekhnichnyi Instytut | Політехнічний інститут | | Sviatoshynsko–Brovarska line | 5 November 1963 | Pylon | 55 m (180 ft) | Pravoberezhna line (at Politekhnichna) |
| Vokzalna | Вокзальна | | Sviatoshynsko–Brovarska line | 6 November 1960 | Pylon | 42 m (138 ft) | Pravoberezhna line (at Starovokzalna); Kyiv City Express; Kyiv Boryspil Express; Kyiv-Pasazhyrskyi railway station |
| Universytet | Університет | | Sviatoshynsko–Brovarska line | 6 November 1960 | Pylon | 87 m (285 ft) | |
| Teatralna^ (Note: Known as Leninska (Ленінська) from 1987 to 1992.) | Театральна | | Sviatoshynsko–Brovarska line | 6 November 1987 | Pylon | 70 m (230 ft) | Syretsko–Pecherska line (at Zoloti Vorota) |
| Khreshchatyk^ | Хрещатик | | Sviatoshynsko–Brovarska line | 6 November 1960 | Pylon | 60 m (197 ft) | Obolonsko–Teremkivska line (at Maidan Nezalezhnosti) |
| Arsenalna | Арсенальна | | Sviatoshynsko–Brovarska line | 6 November 1960 | Pylon | 105.5 m (346 ft) | |
| Dnipro | Дніпро | | Sviatoshynsko–Brovarska line | 6 November 1960 | Bridge | >0 m (0 ft) | |
| Hidropark | Гідропарк | | Sviatoshynsko–Brovarska line | 5 November 1965 | At-grade | 0 m (0 ft) | |
| Livoberezhna | Лівобережна | | Sviatoshynsko–Brovarska line | 5 November 1965 | Bridge | >0 m (0 ft) | Kyiv City Express; Livoberezhna railway station |
| Darnytsia | Дарниця | | Sviatoshynsko–Brovarska line | 5 November 1965 | At-grade | 0 m (0 ft) | |
| Chernihivska (Note: Known as Komsomolska (Комсомольська) from 1968 to 1993.) | Чернігівська | | Sviatoshynsko–Brovarska line | 4 November 1968 | At-grade | 0 m (0 ft) | |
| Lisova† (Note: Known as Pionerska (Піонерська) from 1979 to 1993.) | Лісова | | Sviatoshynsko–Brovarska line | 5 December 1968 | At-grade | 0 m (0 ft) | |
| Heroiv Dnipra† | Героїв Дніпра | | Obolonsko–Teremkivska line (Note: In Ukrainian, Оболонсько-Теремківська лінія. Known as Kurenivsko-Chervonoarmiiska line (Куренівсько-Червоноармійська лінія) from 1976 to 2018.) | 6 November 1982 | Shallow column | 5 m (16 ft) | |
| Minska | Мінська | | Obolonsko–Teremkivska line | 6 November 1982 | Single-vault | 8 m (26 ft) | |
| Obolon (Note: Known as Prospekt Korniichuka (Проспект Корнійчука) from 1980 to 1990.) | Оболонь | | Obolonsko–Teremkivska line | 19 December 1980 | Shallow column | 6.5 m (21 ft) | |
| Pochaina (Note: Known as Petrivka (Петрівка) from 1980 to 2018.) | Почайна | | Obolonsko–Teremkivska line | 19 December 1980 | Shallow column | 6 m (20 ft) | Kyiv City Express; Pochaina railway station |
| Tarasa Shevchenka | Тараса Шевченка | | Obolonsko–Teremkivska line | 19 December 1980 | Shallow column | 7 m (23 ft) | |
| Kontraktova Ploshcha (Note: Known as Chervona Ploshcha (Червона площа) from 1976 to 1990.) | Контрактова площа | | Obolonsko–Teremkivska line | 17 December 1976 | Shallow column | 8 m (26 ft) | |
| Poshtova Ploshcha | Поштова площа | | Obolonsko–Teremkivska line | 17 December 1976 | Shallow column | 10 m (33 ft) | Kyiv Funicular |
| Maidan Nezalezhnosti^ (Note: Known as Ploshcha Kalinina (Площа Калініна) from 1976 to 1977 and as Ploshcha Zhovtnevoi Revoliutsii (Площа Жовтневої революції) from 1977 to 1991.) | Майдан Незалежності | | Obolonsko–Teremkivska line | 17 December 1976 | Deep column | 60 m (197 ft) | Sviatoshynsko–Brovarska line (at Khreshchatyk) |
| Ploshcha Ukrainskykh Heroiv^ (Note: Known as Ploshcha Lva Tolstoho (Площа Льва Толстого) from 1981 to 2023.) | Площа Українських героїв | | Obolonsko–Teremkivska line | 19 December 1981 | Pylon | 72 m (236 ft) | Syretsko–Pecherska line (at Palats Sportu) |
| Olimpiiska (Note: Known as Respublikanskyi Stadion (Республіканський стадіон) from 1981 to 2011.) | Олімпійська | | Obolonsko–Teremkivska line | 19 December 1981 | Pylon | 37 m (121 ft) | |
| Palats Ukraina (Note: Known as Chervonoarmiiska (Червоноармійська) from 1984 to 1993.) | Палац «Україна» | | Obolonsko–Teremkivska line | 30 December 1984 | Pylon | 32 m (105 ft) | |
| Lybidska (Note: Known as Dzerzhynska (Дзержинська) from 1984 to 1993.) | Либідська | | Obolonsko–Teremkivska line | 30 December 1984 | Pylon | 22 m (72 ft) | |
| Demiivska | Деміївська | | Obolonsko–Teremkivska line | 15 December 2010 | Shallow column | 12 m (39 ft) | |
| Holosiivska | Голосіївська | | Obolonsko–Teremkivska line | 15 December 2010 | Shallow column | 12 m (39 ft) | |
| Vasylkivska | Васильківська | | Obolonsko–Teremkivska line | 15 December 2010 | Single-vault | 8 m (26 ft) | |
| Vystavkovyi Tsentr | Виставковий центр | | Obolonsko–Teremkivska line | 27 December 2011 | Single-vault | 8 m (26 ft) | |
| Ipodrom | Іподром | | Obolonsko–Teremkivska line | 25 October 2012 | Shallow column | 12 m (39 ft) | |
| Teremky† | Теремки | | Obolonsko–Teremkivska line | 25 October 2013 | Single-vault | 12 m (39 ft) | |
| Syrets† | Сирець | | Syretsko–Pecherska line (Note: In Ukrainian, Сирецько-Печерська лінія) | 14 October 2004 | Pylon | 60 m (197 ft) | Kyiv City Express; Syrets railway station |
| Dorohozhychi | Дорогожичі | | Syretsko–Pecherska line | 30 March 2000 | Pylon | 76 m (249 ft) | |
| Lukianivska | Лук'янівська | | Syretsko–Pecherska line | 30 December 1996 | Pylon | 69 m (226 ft) | |
| Zoloti Vorota^ | Золоті ворота | | Syretsko–Pecherska line | 31 December 1989 | Deep column | 96.5 m (317 ft) | Sviatoshynsko–Brovarska line (at Teatralna) |
| Palats Sportu^ | Палац спорту | | Syretsko–Pecherska line | 31 December 1989 | Pylon | 72 m (236 ft) | Obolonsko–Teremkivska line (at Ploshcha Ukrainskykh Heroiv) |
| Klovska (Note: Known as Mechnykova (Мечникова) from 1989 to 1993.) | Кловська | | Syretsko–Pecherska line | 31 December 1989 | Pylon | 40 m (131 ft) | |
| Pecherska | Печерська | | Syretsko–Pecherska line | 27 December 1997 | Pylon | 89 m (292 ft) | |
| Zvirynetska (Note: Known as Druzhby Narodiv (Дружби народів) from 1991 to 2023.) | Звіринецька | | Syretsko–Pecherska line | 30 December 1991 | Pylon | 66 m (217 ft) | |
| Vydubychi | Видубичі | | Syretsko–Pecherska line | 30 December 1991 | Shallow column | 8 m (26 ft) | Kyiv City Express; Kyiv Boryspil Express; Vydubychi railway station |
| Slavutych | Славутич | | Syretsko–Pecherska line | 30 December 1992 | Shallow column | 7 m (23 ft) | |
| Osokorky | Осокорки | | Syretsko–Pecherska line | 30 December 1992 | Single-vault | 9 m (30 ft) | |
| Pozniaky | Позняки | | Syretsko–Pecherska line | 28 December 1994 | Shallow column | 12 m (39 ft) | |
| Kharkivska | Харківська | | Syretsko–Pecherska line | 28 December 1994 | Single-vault | 8 m (26 ft) | |
| Vyrlytsia | Вирлиця | | Syretsko–Pecherska line | 8 March 2006 | Shallow column | 8 m (26 ft) | |
| Boryspilska | Бориспільська | | Syretsko–Pecherska line | 23 August 2005 | Single-vault | 8 m (26 ft) | |
| Chervonyi Khutir† | Червоний хутір | | Syretsko–Pecherska line | 23 May 2008 | Shallow column | 8 m (26 ft) | |

=== Future stations ===
Not shown here are stations that are planned to be built in the far future as well as scrapped ideas. This includes the westward and the scrapped eastward extensions of the Sviatoshynsko–Brovarska line; two southern extensions of the Obolonsko–Teremkivska line; the further westward (second and third phases of metro to Vynohradar) and the possible eastward extensions of the Syretsko–Pecherska line, as well the scrapped project of Hertsena station located between Dorohozhychi and Lukianivska; the westward (towards the train station, Solomianka, Chokolivka, and Kyiv International Airport) and eastward (towards Voskresenka and Vyhurivshchyna–Troieshchyna) extensions of the Podilsko–Vyhurivska line; and the proposed Livoberezhna and Vyshhorodsko–Darnytska lines.

^ Transfer station
Railway station

Future stations on the Kyiv Metro
| Name | Name (in Ukrainian) | Image | Line | Status | Type | Depth | Connections |
|---|---|---|---|---|---|---|---|
| Varshavska (Note: Known as Prospekt Pravdy (Проспект Правди) from 2021 to 2023.) | Варшавська | | Syretsko–Pecherska line | Under construction (Note: The first phase of Syretsko–Pecherska line's northward extension to Vynohradar is under construction since 2019. Despite numerous delays caused by the COVID-19 pandemic, the Russo-Ukrainian war, and the previous construction company's failures to meet the deadline, the construction is ongoing. The two stations are expected to open in 2027.) | Shallow column | 15 m (49 ft) | |
| Mostytska (Note: To be renamed to Rohoziv Yar (Рогозів яр)) | Мостицька | | Syretsko–Pecherska line | Under construction | Single-vault | 12 m (39 ft) | |
| Lvivska Brama | Львівська брама | | Syretsko–Pecherska line | Unfinished (Note: The construction took place in 1991–1996 but has been on pause since due to financial problems and the unresolved question of the exit's location.) | Pylon | 90 m (295 ft) | |
| Telychka | Теличка | | Syretsko–Pecherska line | Unfinished (Note: The construction started in the late 1980s but has been on pause since 1992 as this station is located in an industrial district and thus expected to have a low usage.) | Shallow column | 9 m (30 ft) | |
| Hlybochytska^ | Глибочицька | | Podilsko–Vyhurivska line (Note: In Ukrainian, Подільсько-Вигурівська лінія) | Planned (Note: The construction of the first phase of the Podilsko–Vyhurivska line was planned to take place after the construction of the Podilskyi Bridge, on which three of its stations (Sudnobudivna, Trukhaniv Ostriv, and Zatoka Desenka) will be located. The bridge was opened for cars on 1 December 2024, but the construction of the metro segment is expected to begin once the bridge is extended over the Kyiv harbor in 2026.) | Pylon | TBA | Syretsko–Pecherska line (at Lukianivska) |
| Podilska^ | Подільська | | Podilsko–Vyhurivska line | Planned | Shallow column | TBA | Obolonsko–Teremkivska line (at Tarasa Shevchenka) |
| Sudnobudivna | Суднобудівна | | Podilsko–Vyhurivska line | Unfinished | Bridge | >0 m (0 ft) | |
| Trukhaniv Ostriv | Труханів острів | | Podilsko–Vyhurivska line | Unfinished | Bridge | >0 m (0 ft) | |
| Zatoka Desenka | Затока Десенка | | Podilsko–Vyhurivska line | Unfinished | Bridge | >0 m (0 ft) | |
| Raiduzhna | Райдужна | | Podilsko–Vyhurivska line | Planned | Single-vault | TBA | Livoberezhna line (planned); Kyiv City Express; Voskresenka railway station |

== See also ==
- Transport in Kyiv
- List of Dnipro Metro stations
- List of Kharkiv Metro stations
- List of Kryvyi Rih Metrotram stations
