= Telychka (Kyiv Metro) =

Kyiv Metro Station

General information
- Coordinates: 50°23′47″N 30°34′18″E
- System: Kyiv Metro station
- Owner: Kyiv Metro
- Line: Syretsko–Pecherska line

Construction
- Structure type: underground

Other information
- Station code: 320

History
- Opened: unopened

Services
Preceding station	Kyiv Metro	Following station
Vydubychi towards Syrets	Syretsko–Pecherska line	Slavutych towards Chervonyi Khutir
Location

Telychka (Ukrainian: Теличка) is an unfinished station on the Kyiv Metro's Syretsko–Pecherska line located in between the Vydubychi and Slavutych stations. The station is located in the Telychka neighborhood of Kyiv's right-bank Holosiiv Raion (district). It is the last station on the Syretsko-Pecherska Line that is located on Kyiv's right bank, right before the Pivdennyi Bridge.

The station's construction was first envisioned in the late 1980s to the early 1990s, along with the other neighboring stations. It was then known as the Naddniprianska (Ukrainian: Наддніпрянська) station. However, its construction was frozen as it was located in a high-density industrial zone that would not have a high passenger ridership. In 2011, it was expected that the station will be finished once the industrial zone is revitalized and converted into a commercial and business complex.

The station was designed as a shallow-level bi-span, with passenger platforms located on either side of the tracks (similar to the design of the Vyrlytsia, Chervonyi Khutir, and Dnipro stations).

== See also ==
- Lvivska Brama, another unfinished station of the Syretsko-Pecherska Line
