= Palats Sportu (Kyiv Metro) =

Kyiv Metro Station

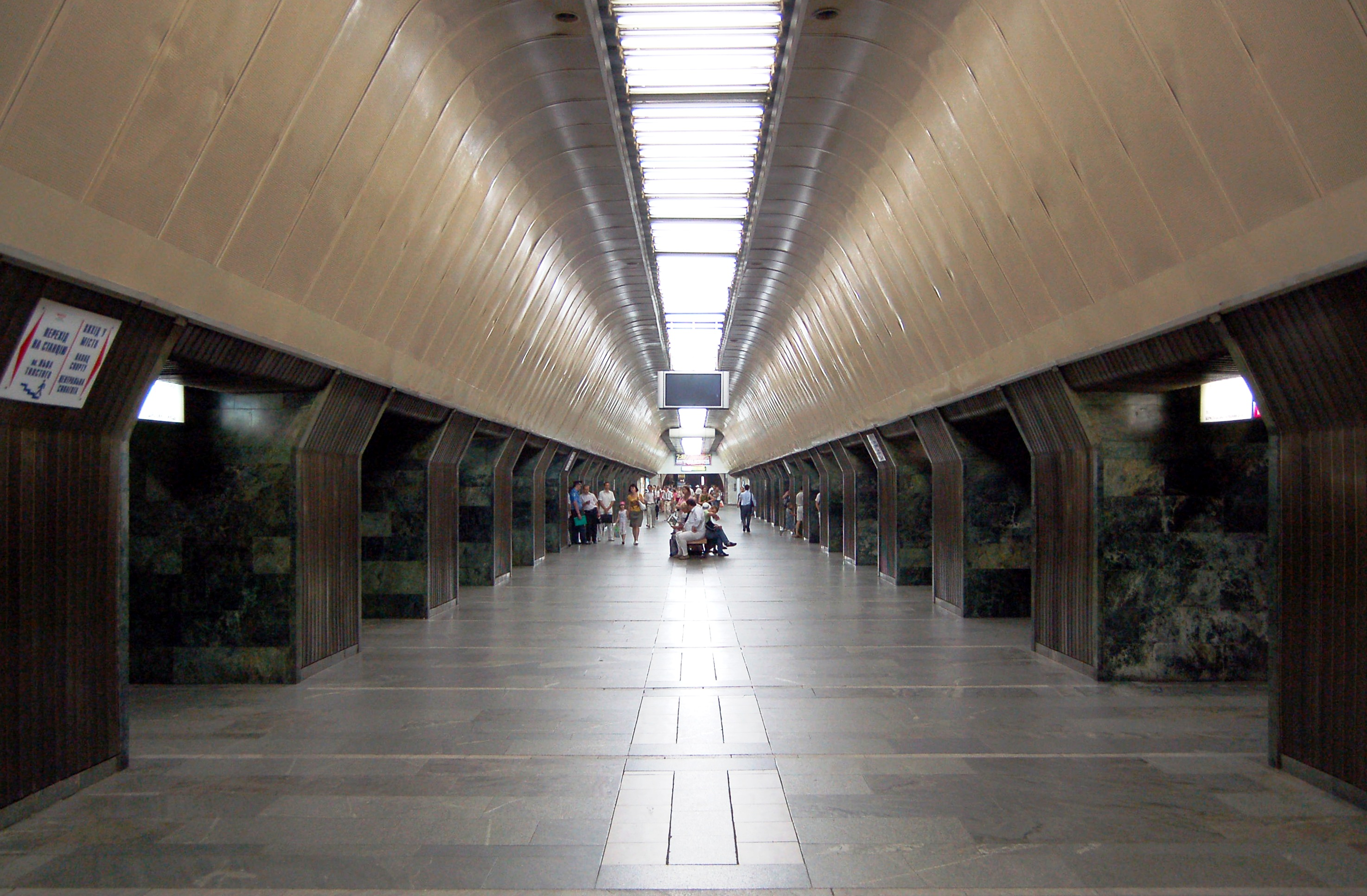

General information
- Location: Pecherskyi District; Kyiv; Ukraine
- Coordinates: 50°26′17″N 30°31′15″E
- System: Kyiv Metro station
- Owner: Kyiv Metro
- Line: Syretsko–Pecherska line
- Platforms: 1
- Tracks: 2

Construction
- Structure type: underground
- Platform levels: 1

Other information
- Station code: 315

History
- Opened: 31 December 1989

Services
Preceding station	Kyiv Metro	Following station
Zoloti Vorota towards Syrets	Syretsko–Pecherska line	Klovska towards Chervonyi Khutir
Olimpiiska towards Heroiv Dnipra	Obolonsko–Teremkivska line transfer at Ploshcha Ukrainskykh Heroiv	Maidan Nezalezhnosti towards Teremky
Location

Palats Sportu (Ukrainian: Палац Спорту, pronounced [pɐˈlɑts ˈspɔrtʊ], lit. 'Palace of Sports') is a station on the Syretsko-Pecherska Line of the Kyiv Metro. Opened on 31 December 1989 as part of the first stage of the line, it formed third and (so far) last transfer point of the system.

The station is named after Kyiv's central Sports Palace, and as a result, its architectural layout (work of architects A.Krushinsky and N.Aleshkin) follows carefully on the theme. Unlike other pylon-trivault stations, Palats Sportu features a non-circular shape of the central hall's ceiling. Made of white plastic panels, this contrasts with the darker color gamma of the rest of the station, and also blends carefully with the lighting elements that are suspended from the apex, just like in a large sport complex.

As mentioned earlier, the remaining of the station is made of darker tones, that include dark brown metal planes for the pylon sides facing the halls and green marble for the internal pylon walls. The platform halls' color gamma is opposite to the central one, which consists of dark plastic planes that cover the ceiling, with one line of fluorescent lighting element running the length of the hall. Also unlike the central hall, the white marbled walls, instead of being horizontal, are curved, and continue the vault all the way to the track level. The floor is covered with neutral brown marble.

Other unique features of the station include the sound isolation of one hall to another, making it impossible to hear an incoming train even from the central hall, this was done specifically as the station formed Kyiv's third transfer point with Ploscha Lva Tolstoho of the Obolonsko–Teremkivska Line, in an attempt not to disorientate the passengers.

The station's vestibule is located on the Sportyvna square, next to the complex itself. During mass celebrations and major sporting events (e.g. the 2005 edition of the Eurovision Song Contest and an international ice hockey tournament in 2017, which took place inside the palace), the station's exits and entrances to the surface are closed, and it functions solely as a transfer point to avoid large crowds.

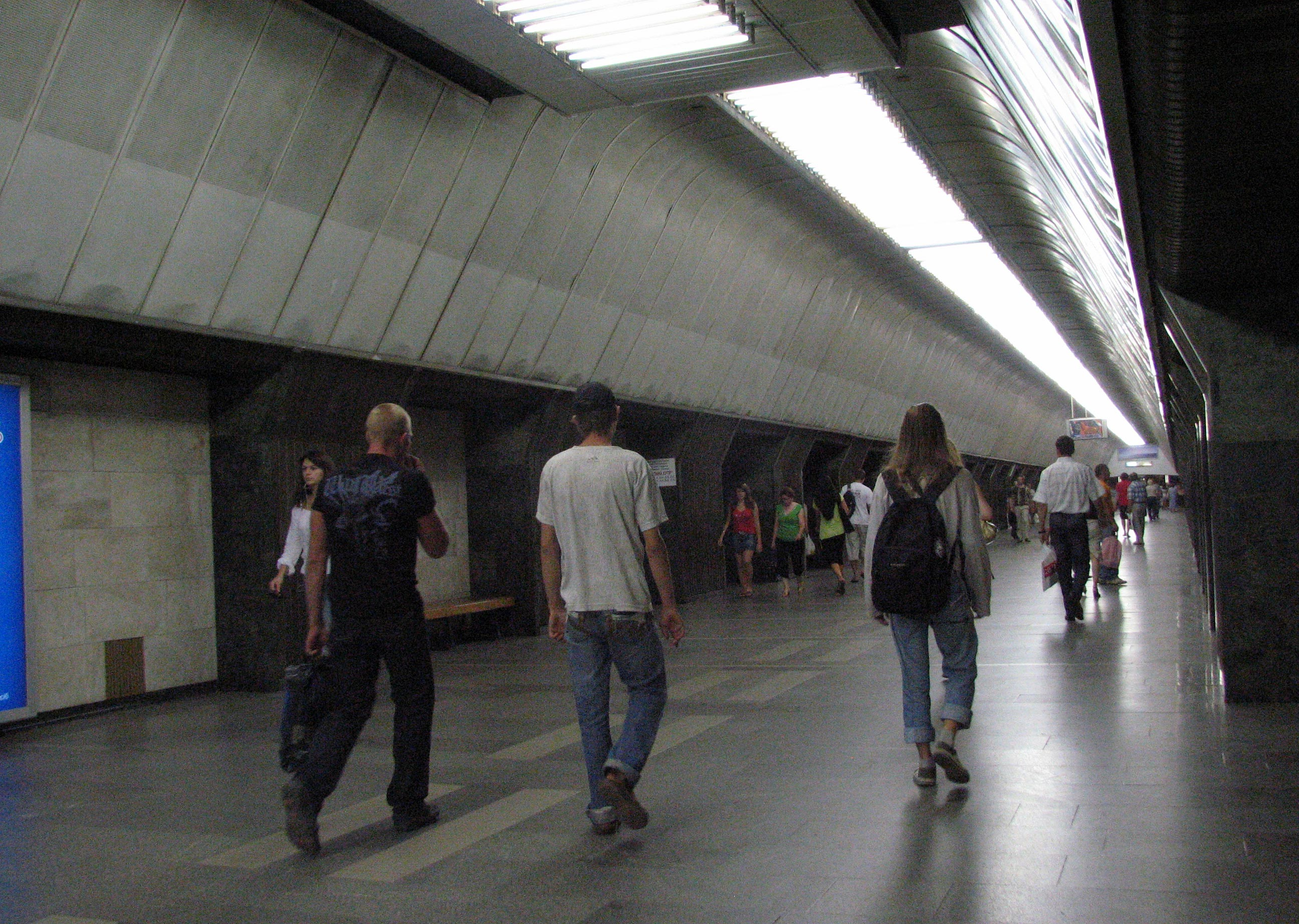
Central hall

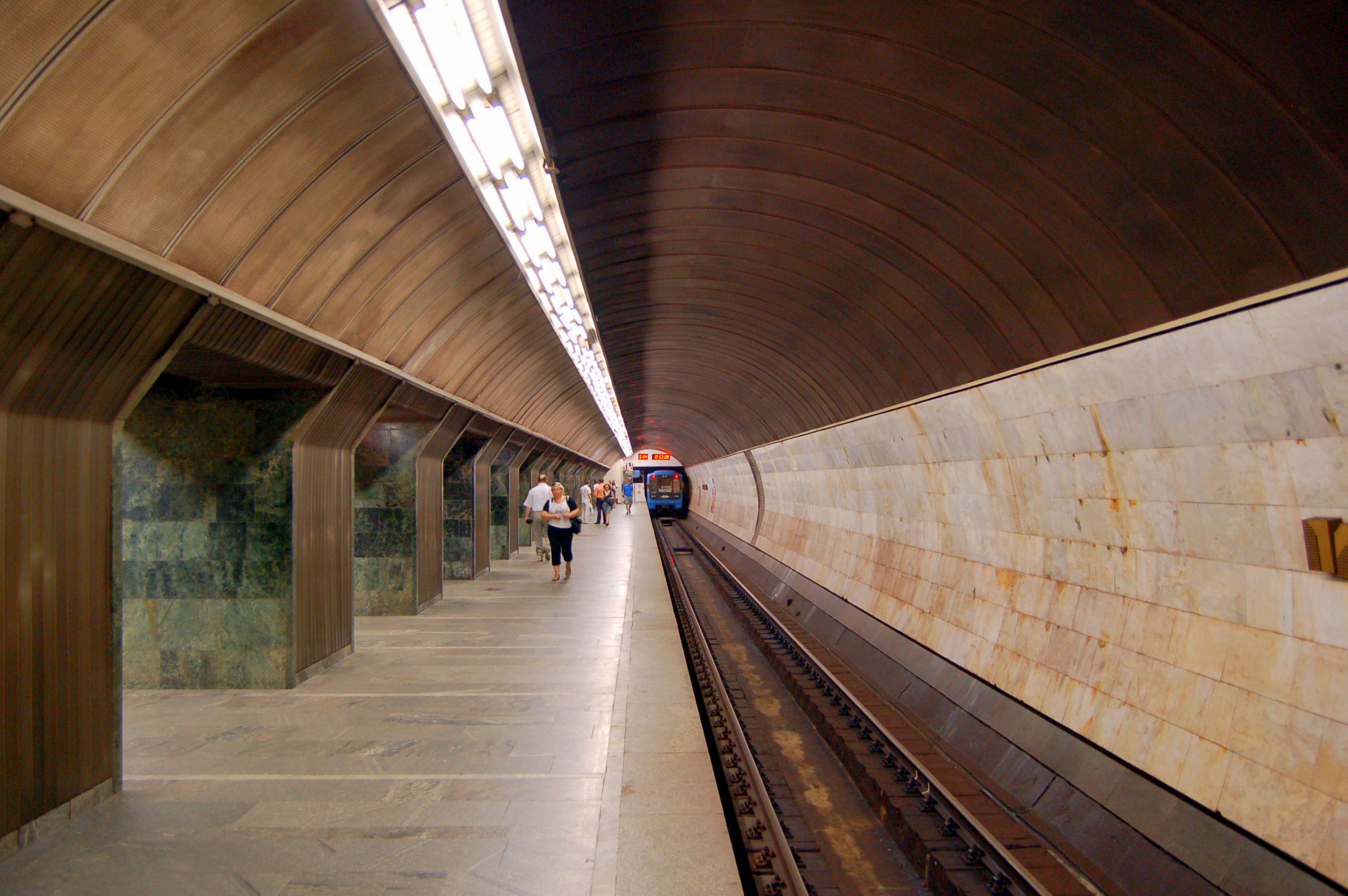
Platform hall

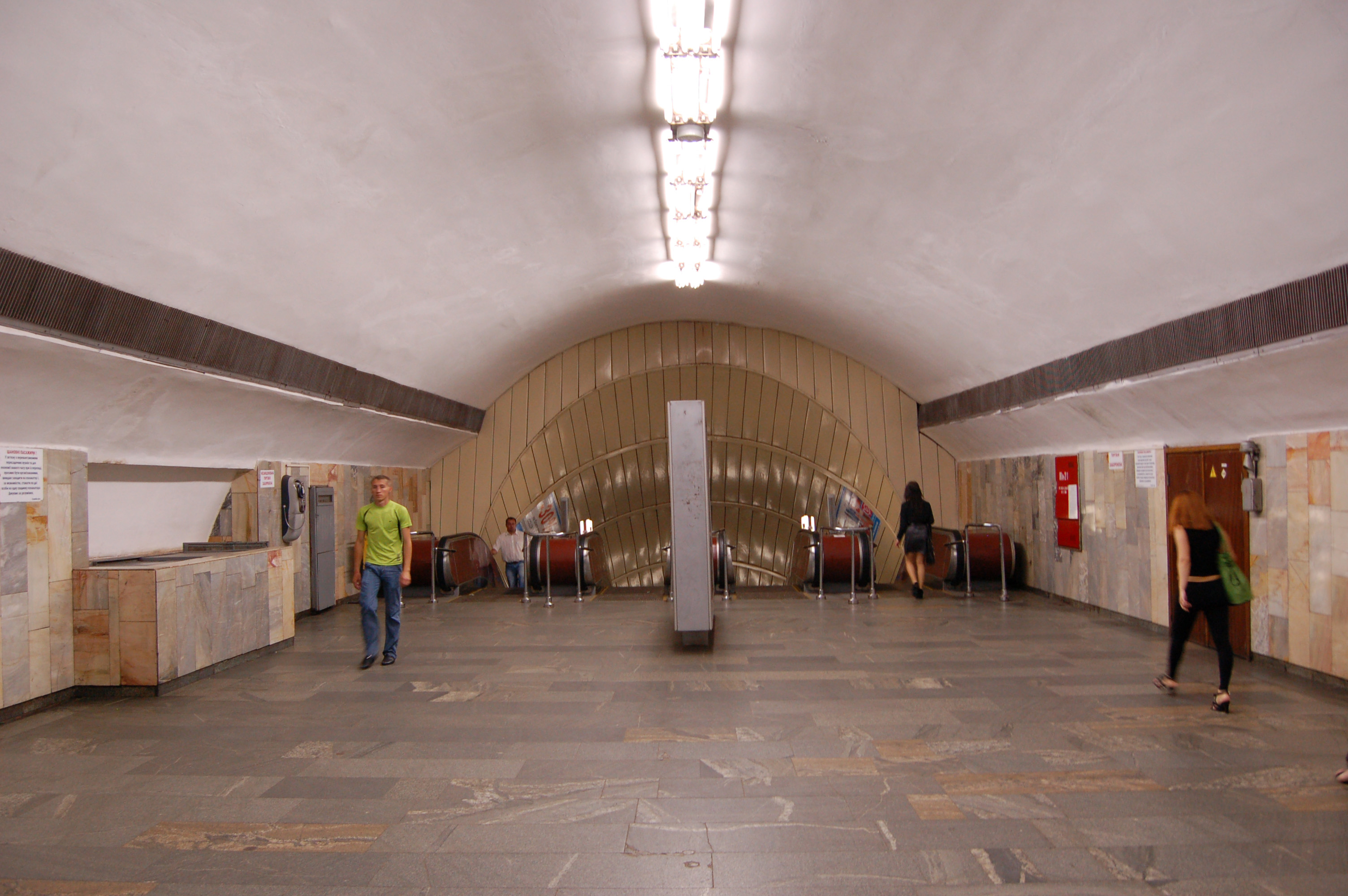
Transfer hall

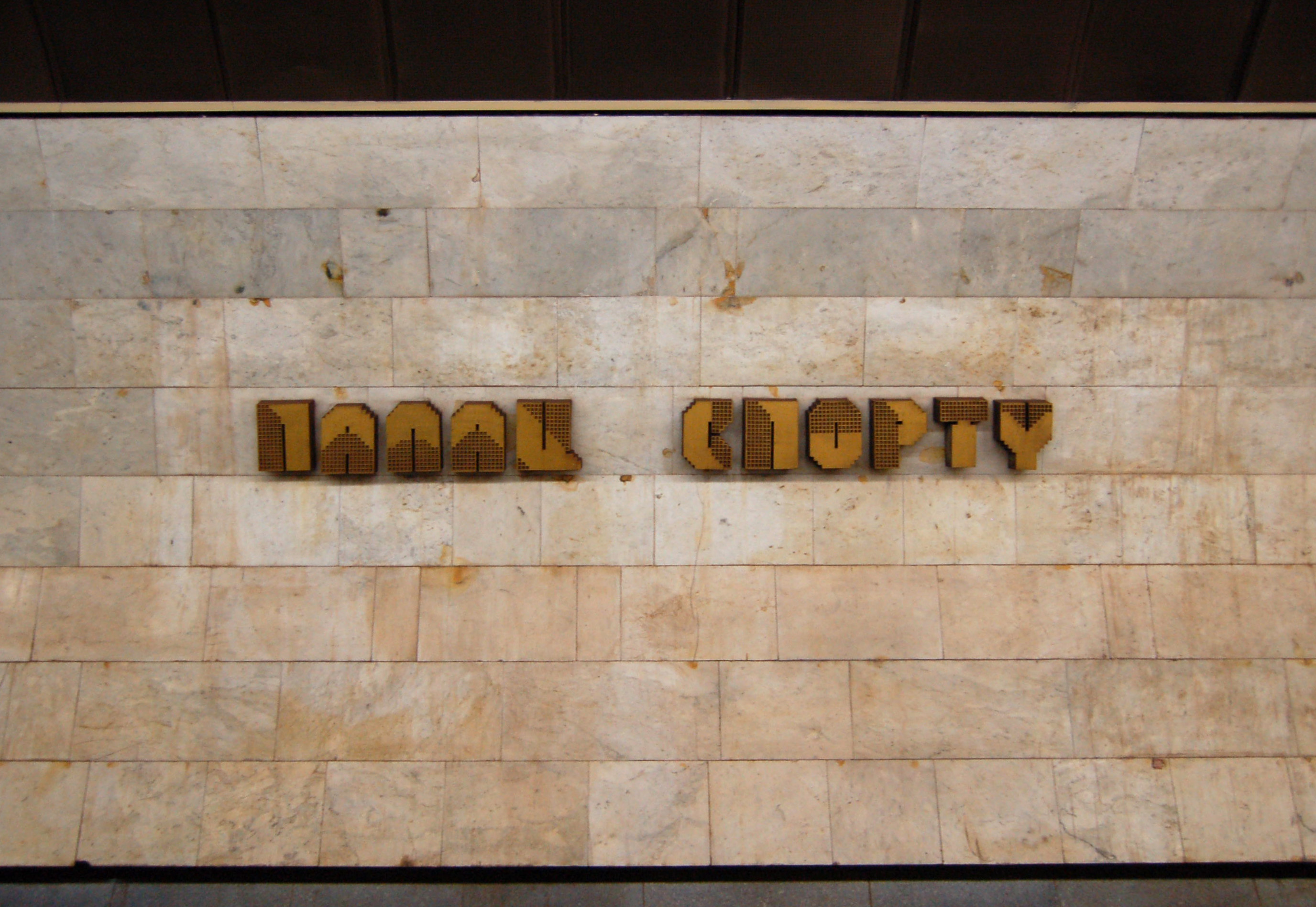
Station name in Ukrainian
