= Ploshcha Ukrainskykh Heroiv (Kyiv Metro) =

Kyiv Metro Station

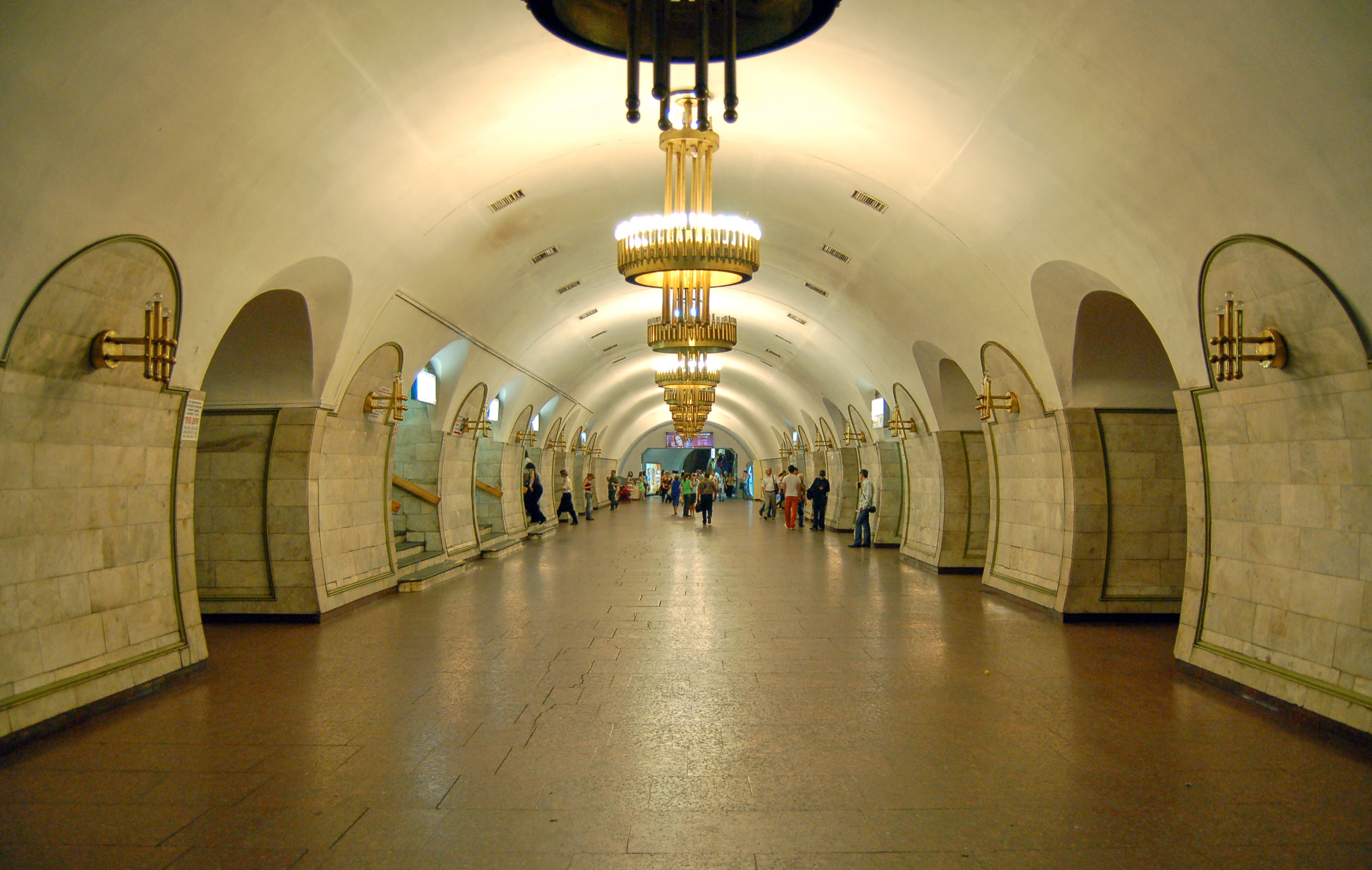
- The Station Hall

General information
- Location: Shevchenkivskyi District; Kyiv; Ukraine
- Coordinates: 50°26′22″N 30°31′00″E
- System: Kyiv Metro station
- Owner: Kyiv Metro
- Line: Obolonsko–Teremkivska line
- Platforms: 2
- Tracks: 2

Construction
- Structure type: underground
- Platform levels: 1

Other information
- Station code: 218

History
- Opened: 19 December 1981

Services
Preceding station	Kyiv Metro	Following station
Maidan Nezalezhnosti towards Heroiv Dnipra	Obolonsko–Teremkivska line	Olimpiiska towards Teremky
Zoloti Vorota towards Syrets	Syretsko–Pecherska line transfer at Palats Sportu	Klovska towards Chervonyi Khutir
Location

Ploshcha Ukrainskykh Heroiv (Ukrainian: Площа Українських Героїв, lit. 'Square of Ukrainian Heroes') is a station on the Obolonsko–Teremkivska Line of the Kyiv Metro system that serves Kyiv, the capital of Ukraine. Until May 2023 it was named Ploshcha Lva Tolstoho (Ukrainian: Площа Льва Толстого,). The station was opened on 19 December 1981, and was named after the writer Leo Tolstoy. Tolstoy had visited the city only once. The station was designed by N.A. Levchuk and V.B. Zhezheryn.

The station is located deep underground and consists of a central hall with arcades in the walls. The central hall has been covered with orange-coloured marble and is lit by chandeliers and decorative lamps placed on the walls. Passenger tunnels connect the station to the Square of Ukrainian Heroes and another street.

The station forms a station complex with a transfer tunnel with the adjoining Palats Sportu station on the Syretsko–Pecherska line.

In a May 2022 online poll (with 170,000 respondents) taken during the 2022 Russian invasion of Ukraine voters chose to rename the station to Vasylia Stusa (named after Vasyl Stus) Another choice was Liny Kostenko (named after Lina Kostenko) On Friday 13 January 2023 the Kyiv City Council announced the metro station would be renamed. In a poll organised by them Kyiv residents cast more than 100,000 votes for the renaming of seven city objects, including this and another metro stations. The majority of the votes went to the name Ukrainian Heroes Square. On 18 May 2023 the Kyiv City Council renamed the station to this name.
