= Lvivska Brama (Kyiv Metro) =

Kyiv Metro Station

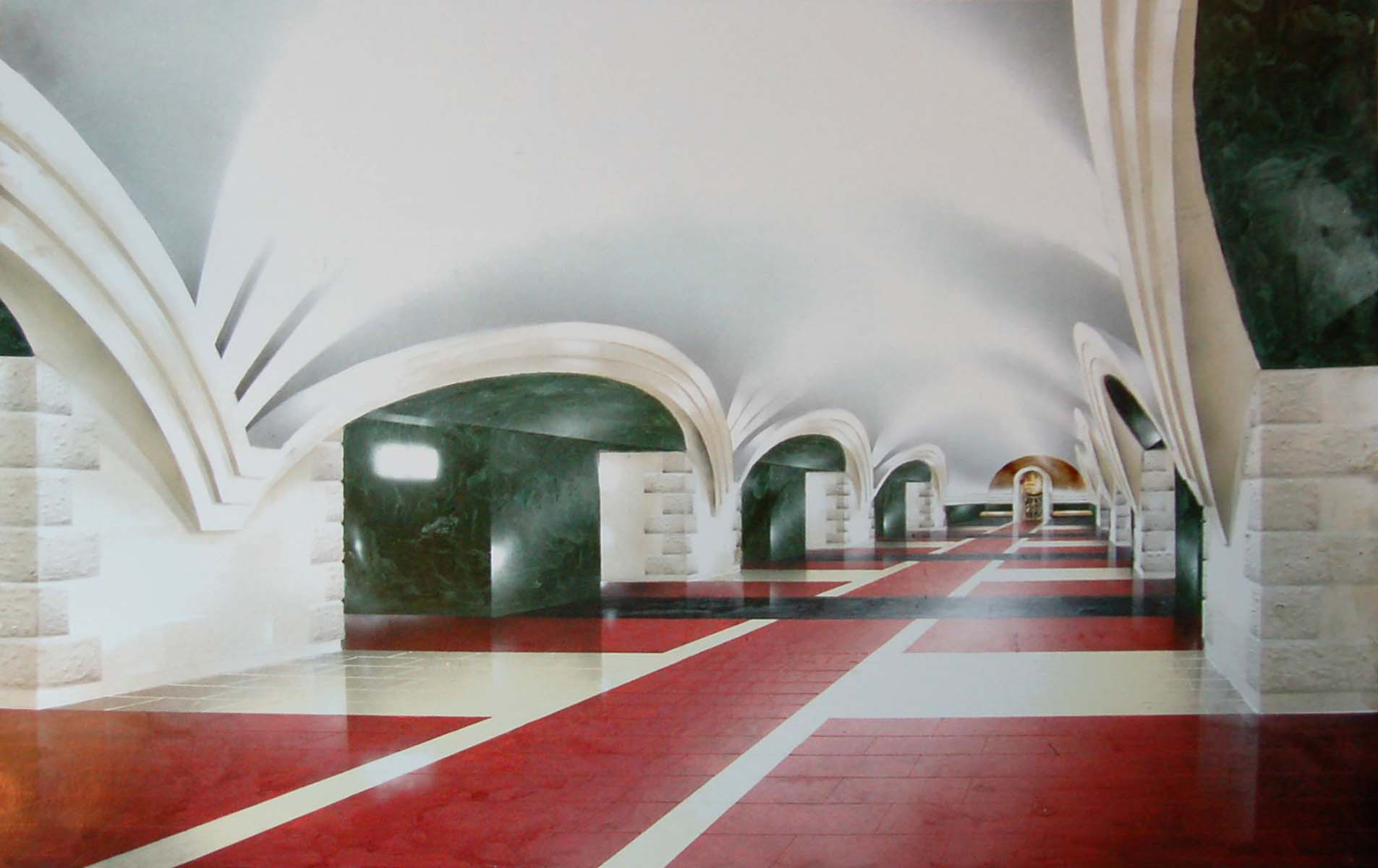
- proposed station hall

General information
- Coordinates: 50°27′15.65″N 30°30′10.85″E
- System: Kyiv Metro station
- Owner: Kyiv Metro
- Line: Syretsko–Pecherska line
- Platforms: 1
- Tracks: 2

Construction
- Structure type: Underground
- Platform levels: 1

Other information
- Station code: 313

History
- Opened: unopened

Services
Preceding station	Kyiv Metro	Following station
Lukianivska towards Syrets	Syretsko–Pecherska line	Zoloti Vorota towards Chervonyi Khutir
Location

Lvivska Brama (Ukrainian: Львiвська Брама, lit. 'Lviv Gate') is a station on the Syretsko-Pecherska Line of the Kyiv Metro between the Lukianivska and Zoloti Vorota stations that was partially built but never opened.

== History ==
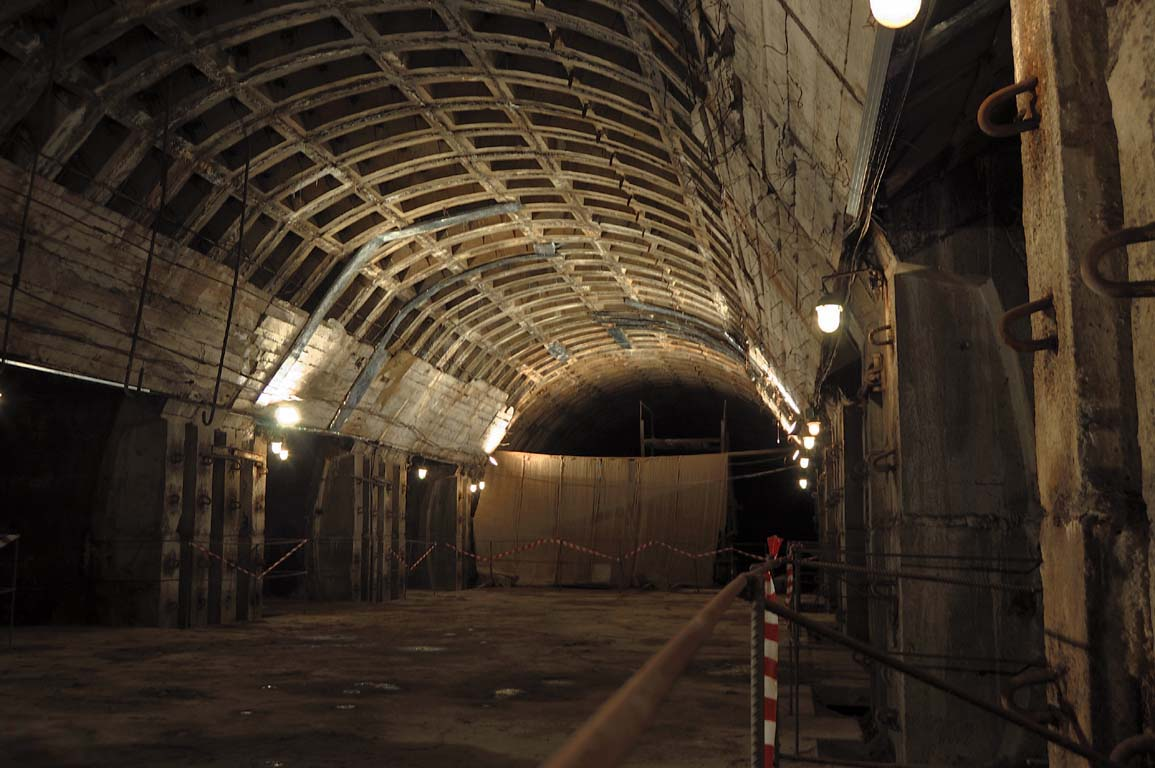
Empty shell of the station concourse (2008)

Originally, upon the construction of the Syretsky radius, which began in 1990, the first stage was to consist of five stations that would open in two phases: Zoloti Vorota – Lukianivska with Lvivska Brama as interim, and then Lukianivska – Syrets with two stations as an interim, and the whole project would be opened in the late 1990s. However, the financial setbacks that the breakup of the Soviet Union brought onto the Ukrainian economy slowed the construction of the Metro, and frequent breaks due to the lack of finances affected the quality. Another important factor was the need for the station. The station would be in the centre of the city where the density of Metro stations was already large, and inter-station distances are short. Moreover, the square for which the station is named (Square of the Lviv Gateway) was (and still is) not important enough for transport links or commercially to justify the station (as opposed to Lukianivska). Finally, it was the square itself that proved to have the deciding reason, because the original location for the escalator tunnel needed altering, and a disagreement arose on where it would be located. All this led to the station not opening with the first part of the Syretsky radius in 1996.

After the financial situation slowly improved in the late 1990s, various optimistic forecasts started promising the completion of the station with a precise opening day: 14 October 1999, 30 December 1999. However, after the opening of the third station on the radius, Dorohozhychi, most attention switched to other extensions and Lvivska Brama was no longer a priority. Ironically, between Dorohozhychi and Lukianivska another station was originally planned, Vulytsia Hertsena, but, unlike Lvivska, only a provision was left.

In early 2007 a contractor was found to resume work on the station. A Lviv-based Zubr company which was to rebuild the square would also be required to complete the station with an opening date of 2010. Construction of the station resumed in July 2008. In May 2012, the station had not been completed due to further construction delays. In February 2022 the site was still an unfinished metro station. On 5 February 2022 Kyiv Metro announced a tender for the design of the station entrance.

Today the station exists as an empty space that can be seen from inside the trains, which slow as they pass, Both widened tunnels for the platform halls are done, but most of the passages to the central hall are still not opened, and the central hall itself is only partially bored through. The original architectural image of the station was to be on par with Lukianivska, both symbolising a break with the Soviet past and a Ukrainian future. The theme for Lvivska Brama would be orientated on Western Ukraine (which would fit in with the name) consisting of sharp, contrasting colour tones. The pylon portals would feature additional white vaults joining at the base of the pylons. Contrasting with this would be the black internal pylon passages. The floor would be arranged in a symmetrical cross pattern of red, white and black granite.

== See also ==
- Telychka, another unfinished station of the Syretsko-Pecherska Line
