= Zvirynetska (Kyiv Metro) =

Kyiv Metro Station

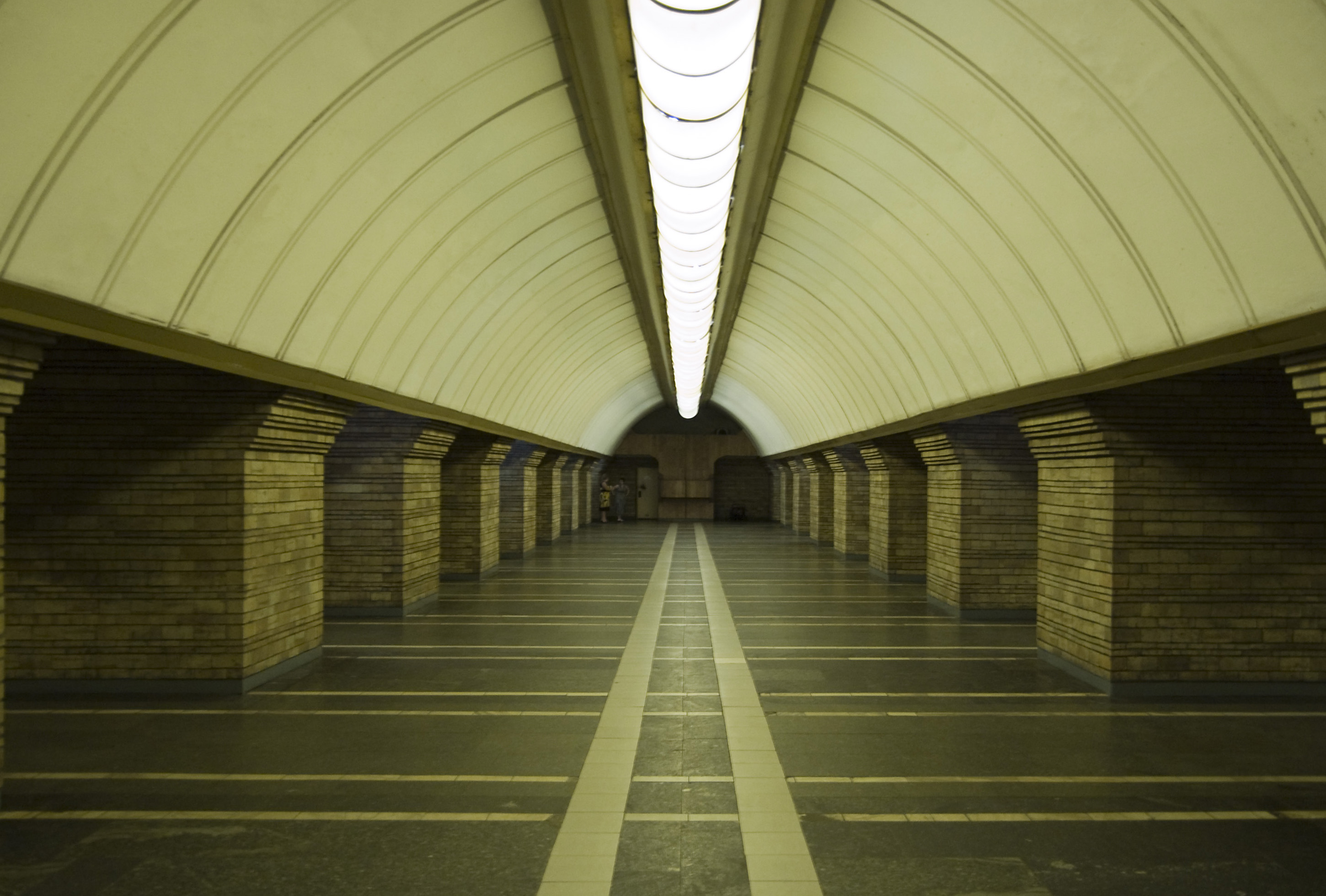

General information
- Location: Pecherskyi District; Kyiv; Ukraine
- Coordinates: 50°25′5″N 30°32′42″E
- System: Kyiv Metro station
- Owner: Kyiv Metro
- Line: Syretsko–Pecherska line
- Platforms: 1
- Tracks: 2

Construction
- Structure type: Underground
- Platform levels: 1

Other information
- Station code: 318

History
- Opened: 30 December 1991

Services
Preceding station	Kyiv Metro	Following station
Pecherska towards Syrets	Syretsko–Pecherska line	Vydubychi towards Chervonyi Khutir
Location

Zvirynetska (Ukrainian: Звіринецька) is a station of Kyiv Metro's Syretsko-Pecherska Line. It is situated between Pecherska and Vydubychi stations. This station was opened on 30 December 1991. Until May 2023 the station was named Druzhby Narodiv or Friendship of Peoples (Ukrainian: Дружби Народів,, named after the former name of Mykola Mikhnovsky Boulevard, which is located above the station)

Druzhby Narodiv station was designed by architects Alyoshkin and Krushynskiy. It is a deep-level station. The station is connected by escalators with a passenger tunnel situated under Mykola Mikhnovsky Boulevard.

The station operates from 05:43 to 00:12.

== History ==
The station was opened on 30 December 1991 under the name of "Druzhby Narodiv", named after the boulevard the station was located under.

On Friday 13 January 2023 the Kyiv City Council announced Druzhby Narodiv metro station would be renamed. In a poll organised by them Kyiv residents cast more than 100,000 votes for the renaming of seven city objects, including this station and Ploshcha Lva Tolstoho. In a May 2022 online poll (with 170,000 respondents) voters chose to rename the station Botanichna (Ukrainian: Ботанічна, lit. 'Botanical') — after the nearby Hryshko National Botanical Garden — in a poll taken during the 2022 Russian invasion of Ukraine; other choices included Yevropeiska (European) and Chervona Kalyna (Red Viburnum). The Druzhby Narodiv boulevard itself was renamed Mykola Mikhnovsky boulevard on 8 December 2022. In the January 2023 poll the majority of votes went to the name Zvirynets (Ukrainian: Звіринець), a historical neighbourhood inside the Pecherskyi District where the metro station is situated in. On 18 May 2023 the Kyiv City Council renamed the station to Zvirynetska.
