= Pecherska (Kyiv Metro) =

Kyiv Metro Station

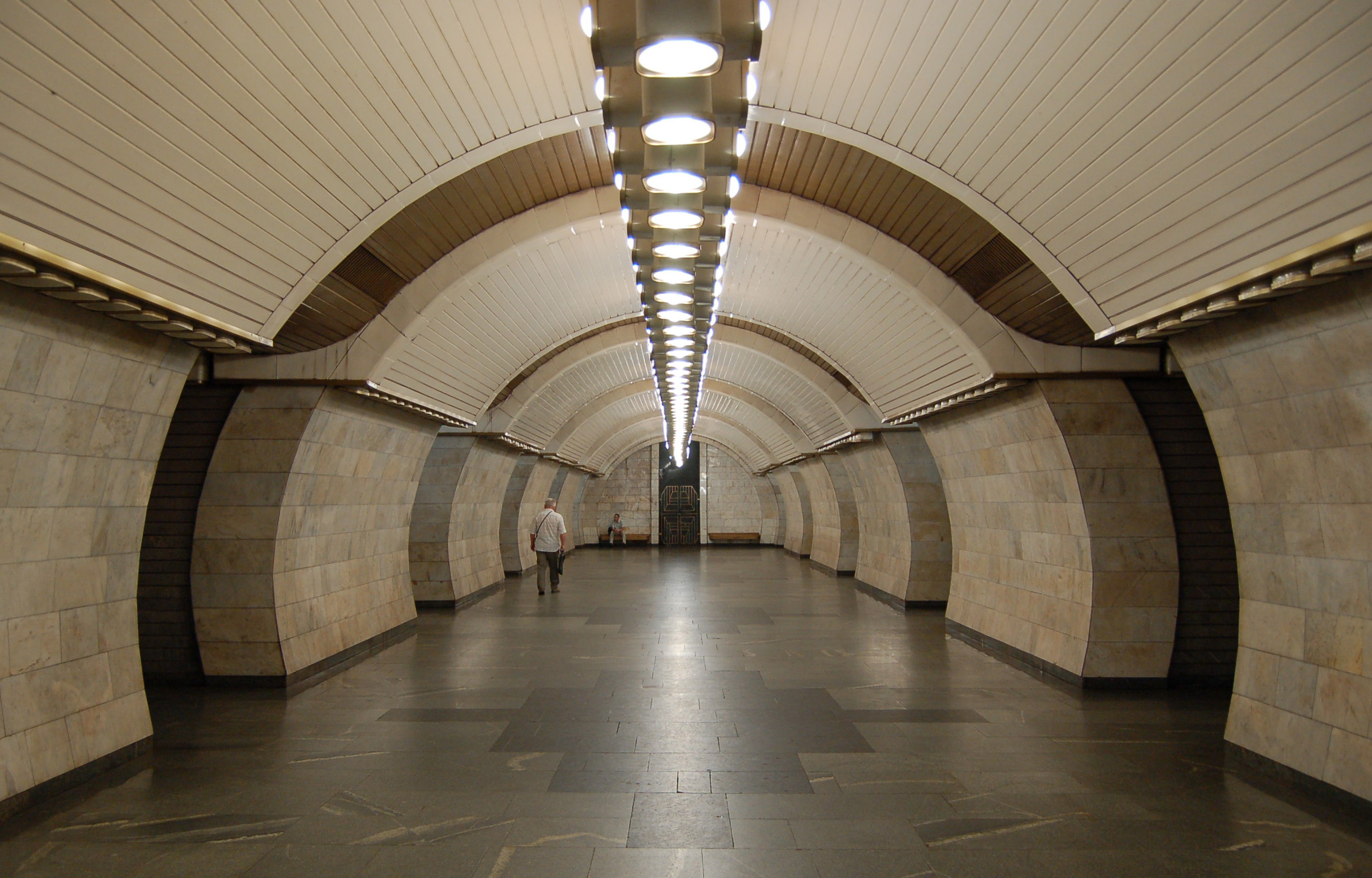

General information
- Location: Pecherskyi District; Kyiv; Ukraine
- Coordinates: 50°25′39″N 30°32′20″E
- System: Kyiv Metro station
- Owner: Kyiv Metro
- Line: Syretsko–Pecherska line
- Platforms: 1
- Tracks: 2

Construction
- Structure type: underground
- Platform levels: 1

Other information
- Station code: 317

History
- Opened: 27 December 1997

Services
| Preceding station | Kyiv Metro | Following station |
|---|---|---|
| Klovska towards Syrets | Syretsko–Pecherska line | Zvirynetska towards Chervonyi Khutir |
Location

Pecherska (Ukrainian: Печерська,) is a station on Kyiv Metro's Syretsko-Pecherska Line. Originally planned to open along with the main section of the line in late 1991, problems with the escalator tunnel meant that work was delayed, and the station finally opened six years later on 27 December 1997.

Designed by architects V. Gnevyshev, M. Alyoshkin and T. Tselokovskaya, Pecherska is a composition that was finalised still under Soviet influence, but slightly re-modeled prior to its opening in mid-1990s. The traditional pylon trivault retains the common white marbled pylons, but adds newly introduced features such as a suspended ceiling that conceals the lighting instruments. Both the suspended vault and the open regions (a pattern which repeats the steps of the pylons) are faced with white and brown aluminium boards respectively. On the platform halls, the brown boards extend right up to the upper socle regions which are replaced with white ones that continue the curvature right up to the socle region above the tracks (in place of a traditional marble wall). Lighting is provided by Sodium lamps hidden in the ends of the ceiling and by an additional long cross shaped elements that run the length of the vault in the central hall. Whilst the floor retains the grey granite.

Pecherska is named after the Pechersk historic neighborhood in Kyiv, located south of the city centre on the right bank of the Dnieper river. Its name is also influenced in the artwork at the end of the central hall. Its only underground vestibule is located on the corner of the Mikhail Kutuzov street and Lesya Ukrainka Boulevard. Its daily passenger traffic is 24.3 thousand people.
