= Lukianivska (Kyiv Metro) =

Kyiv Metro Station

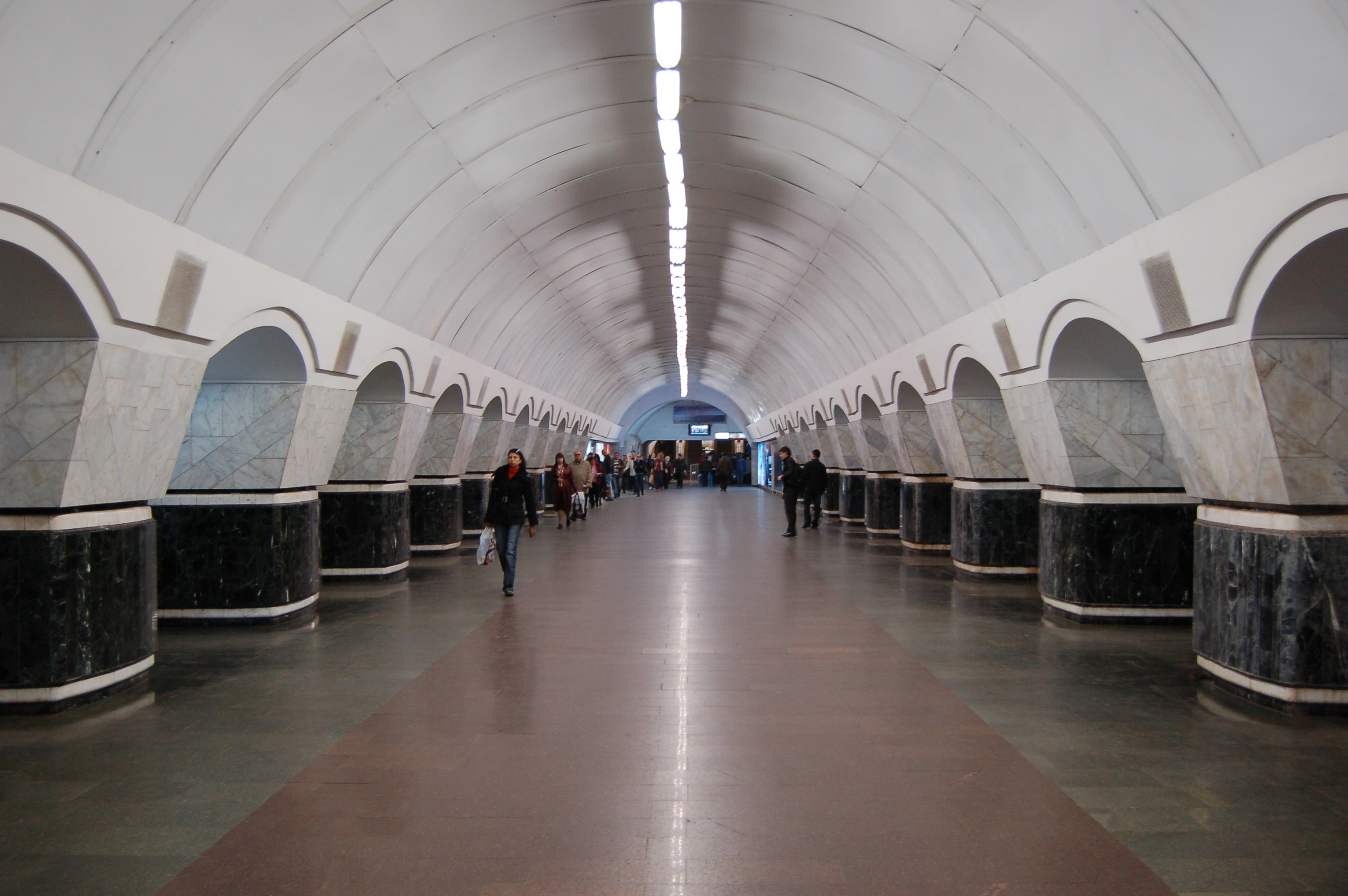
- Station Hall

General information
- Location: Shevchenkivskyi District; Kyiv; Ukraine
- Coordinates: 50°27′45″N 30°28′55″E
- System: Kyiv Metro station
- Owner: Kyiv Metro
- Line: Syretsko–Pecherska line
- Platforms: 1
- Tracks: 2

Construction
- Structure type: underground
- Platform levels: 1

Other information
- Station code: 312

History
- Opened: 30 December 1996

Services
Preceding station	Kyiv Metro	Following station
Dorohozhychi towards Syrets	Syretsko–Pecherska line	Zoloti Vorota towards Chervonyi Khutir
Location

Lukianivska (Ukrainian: Лук'янівська,) is a station on Kyiv Metro's Syretsko–Pecherska line. The station was opened on 30 December 1996, as part of the first stage extension of the Syretsky radius.

Since the beginning of the Russian invasion of Ukraine in 2022, the station vestibule was damaged in Russian attacks seven times. NBC News called the McDonalds near Lukianivska “the most bombed McDonalds in the world”.

== History ==
=== Planning and construction ===
The Syretsky radius was planned in the early 1980s when construction of the whole line began. On opening of the line in 1989, the tunnel boring to the northwest continued, but in line of economic problems during the early 1990s, construction pace was very slow. Also, the original first stage of the radius was supposed to open with two stations, this and Lvivska Brama. However, due to geological projects with Lvivska Brama, works on the station were stopped in the early 1990s. Lukianivska was opened in 1996 as the first deep level station following the independence of Ukraine with a new original design (stations opened along the Pechersky radius in 1991–1994 were all from architecture which dates to Soviet-time designs, when they were starting to be built).

In such a case Lukianivska for the first time, after the turbulent early 1990s, demonstrated an insight into a future. The design, work of architects N. Alyoshkin, V. Gnevyshev and T. Tselikovskaya, incorporates a classic pylon tri-vault design with plastered ceilings and granite floor. Darker black marble is used for lower parts of the pylon, whilst white marble is used for the top and floor. One of the station's most featured details is lighting which consists of a metallic curved pipes with a standard filament light bulb, giving the appearance of a sprouting flower. The large quantity of these elements highlight the bright and cheerful design of the station.

However, when the station was built, due to the low quality of the engineering from the constant breaks in construction due to financial reasons, the hydroisolation of the station was not properly done. As a result, what are meant to be bright white ceilings, are now stained with constant leakages from the soil water. This has a profound impact on the overall appearance of the station.

The station is situated in the middle of the Lukianivska Square, where the large white-marble faced vestibule structure was built (effectively halving the square in process). The upper level of the vestibule is occupied by a store. The opening of the station had a considerable impact on the passenger traffic on stations of the Sviatoshynsko-Brovarska Line, although four years later after the opening of the second stage of the radius with the station Dorohozhychi and Lukianivska ceasing to be the terminus, there was a notable drop. However the existing passenger traffic is insignificant to what it will be after the opening of the Hlybochitska station of the Podilsko-Voskresenska Line, and Lukianivska becoming a transfer station. The connection will likely include a link to the far end of the central hall, which is now occupied by a white marble wall.

=== Russian attacks ===
During the Russian invasion of Ukraine, following Russian attacks on Kyiv, the station vestibule was damaged in explosion waves multiple times. The vestibule was damaged on 15 March 2022, 29 December 2023, 8 July 2024, 18 January and 21 July 2025, 24 May 2026, the latest being on 19 July of the following year. NBC News called the McDonalds near Lukianivska “the most bombed McDonalds in the world”.

== Gallery ==
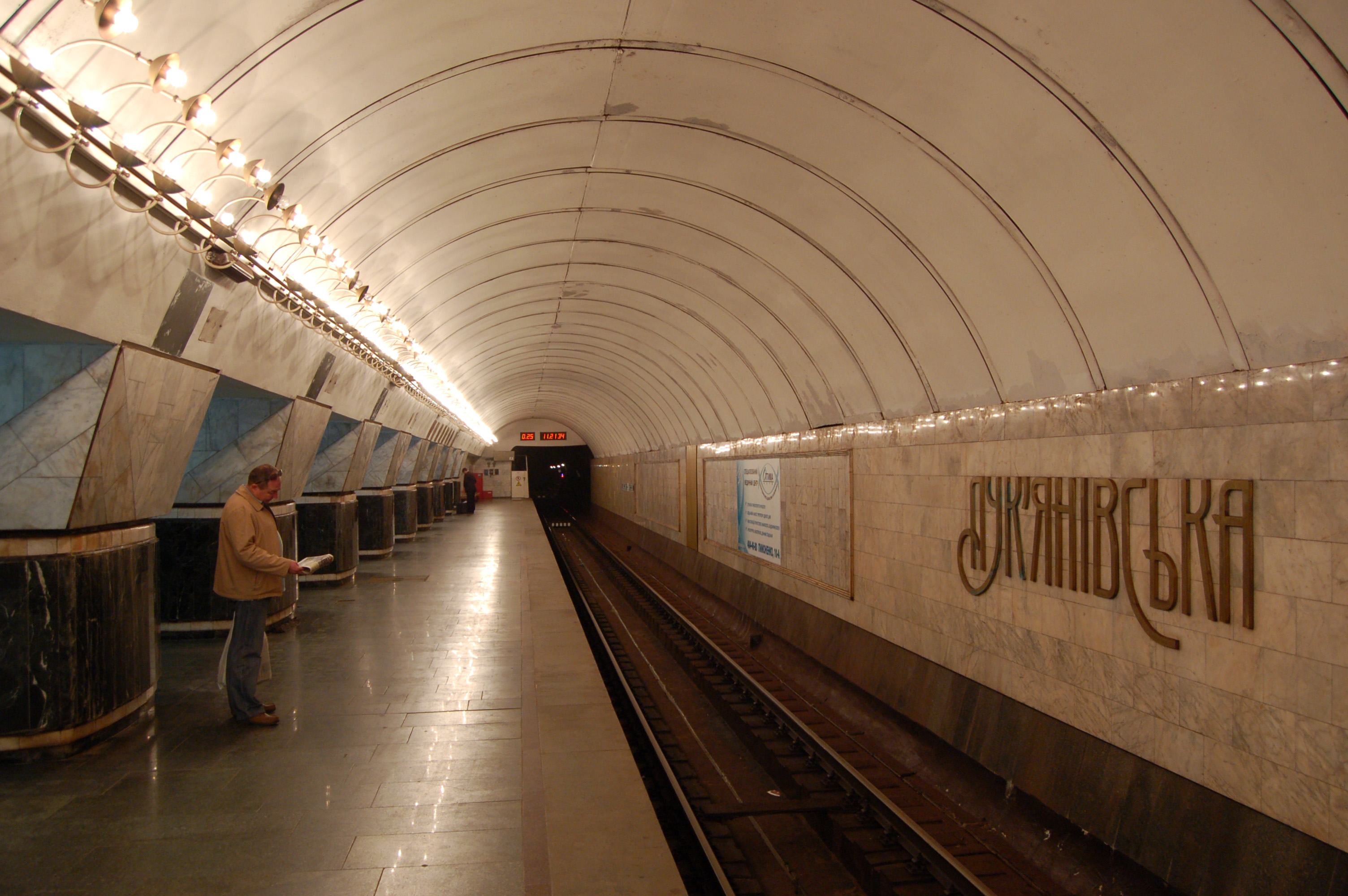
Platform

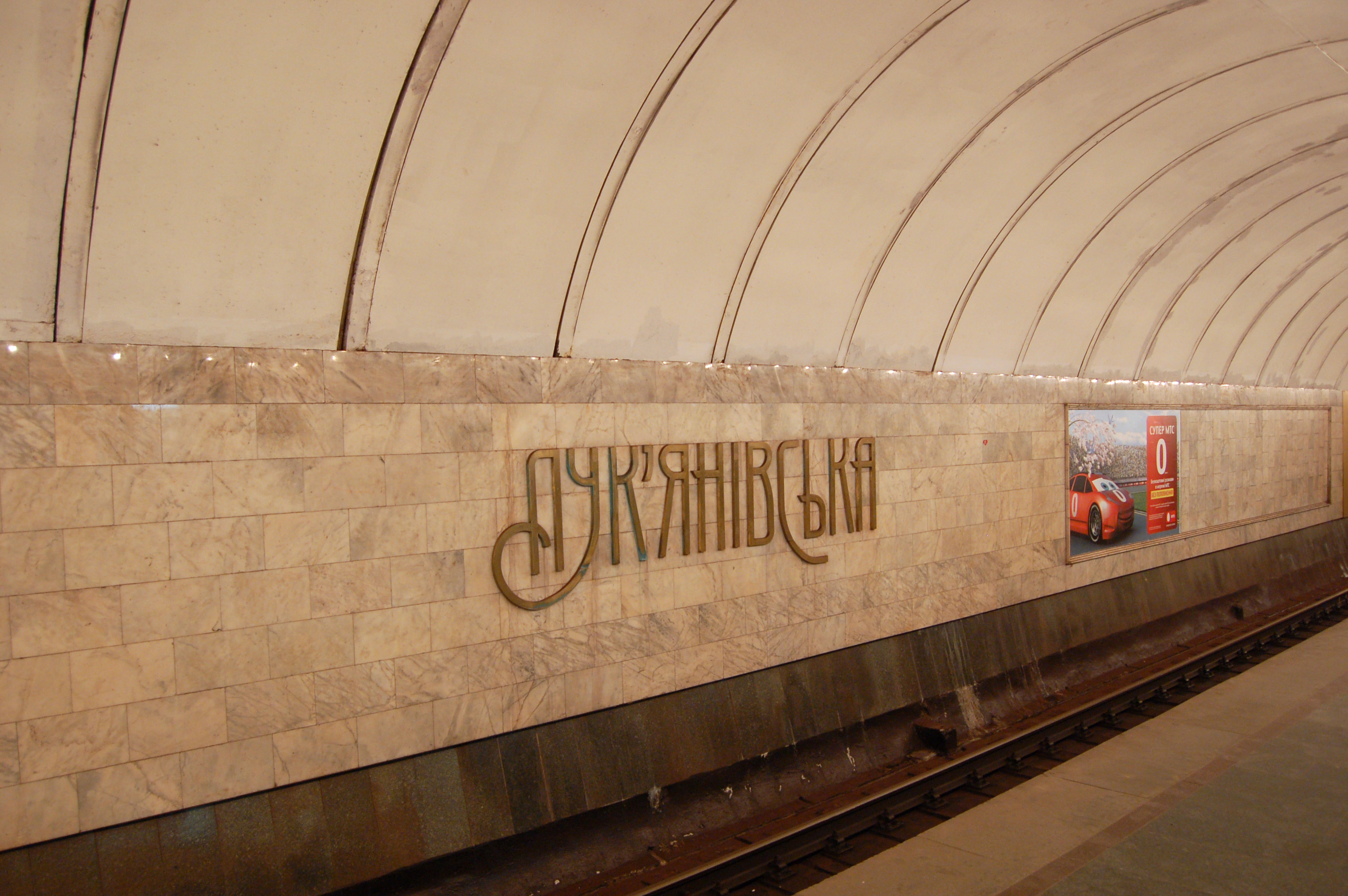
Name on the wall

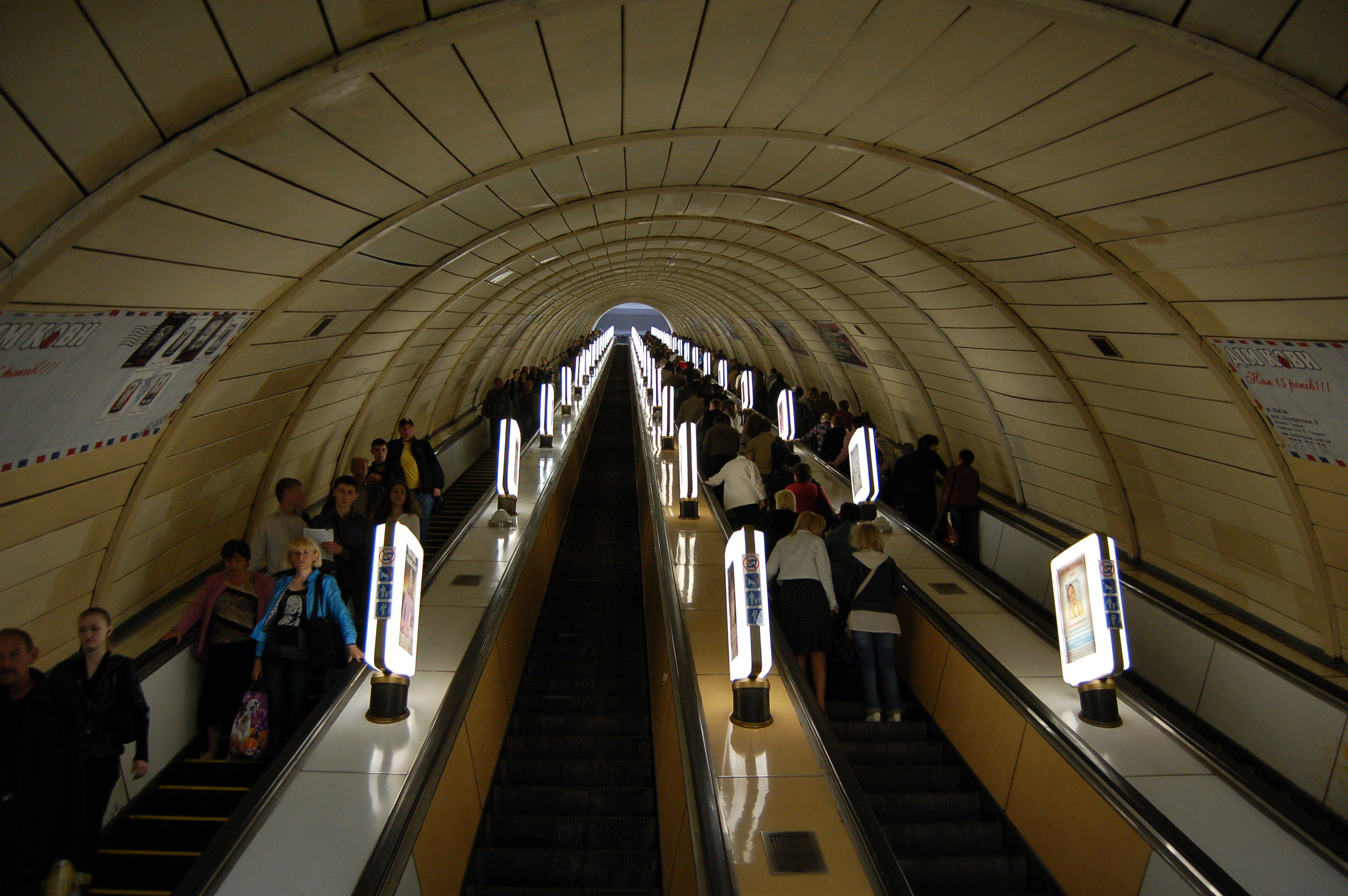
Escalators

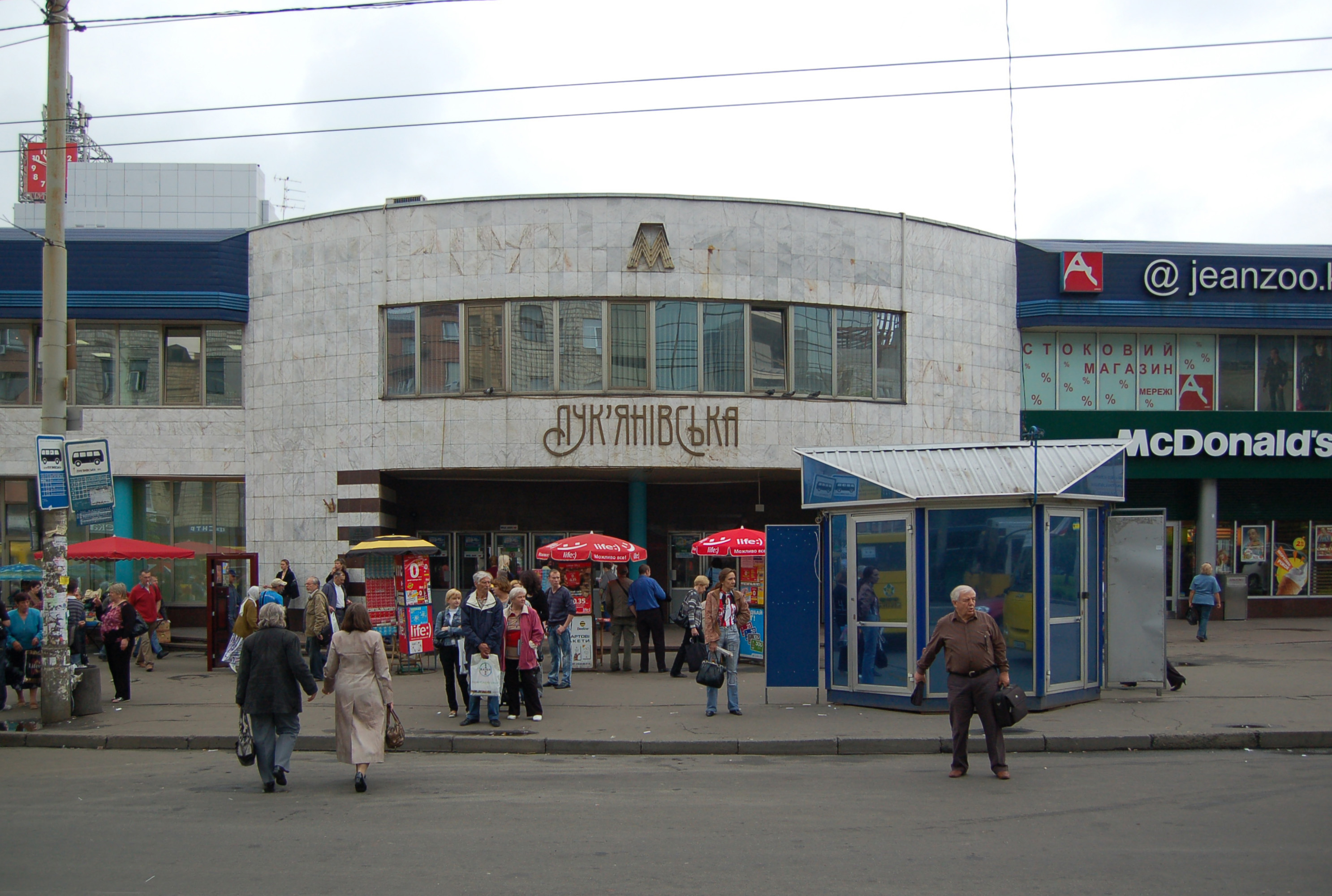
Vestibule
