= Klovska (Kyiv Metro) =

Kyiv Metro station

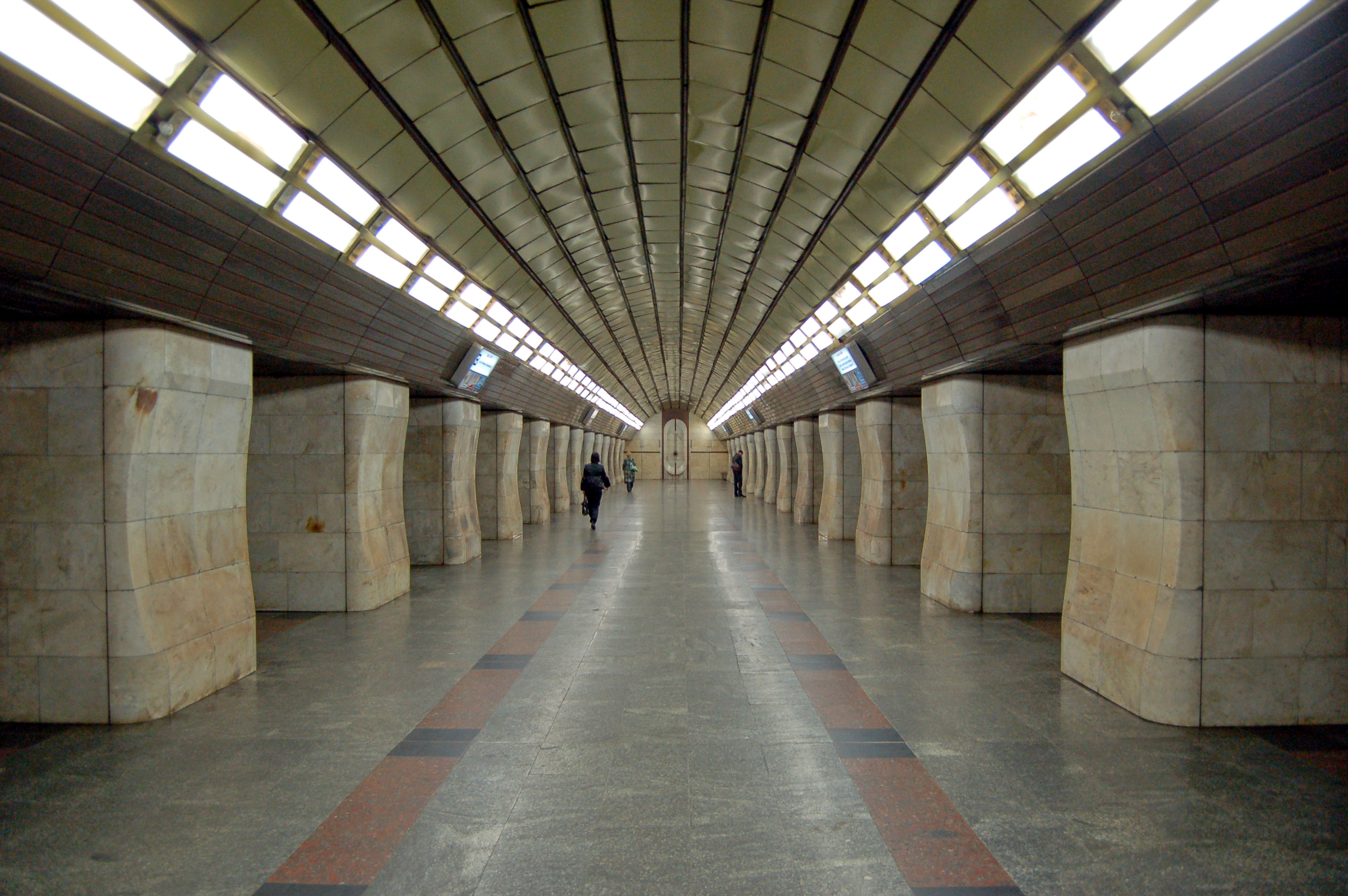

General information
- Location: Pecherskyi District; Kyiv; Ukraine
- Coordinates: 50°26′13″N 30°31′54″E
- System: Kyiv Metro station
- Owner: Kyiv Metro
- Line: Syretsko–Pecherska line
- Platforms: 1
- Tracks: 2

Construction
- Structure type: underground
- Platform levels: 1

Other information
- Station code: 316

History
- Opened: 31 December 1989
- Former names: Mechnikova

Services
| Preceding station | Kyiv Metro | Following station |
|---|---|---|
| Palats Sportu towards Syrets | Syretsko–Pecherska line | Pecherska towards Chervonyi Khutir |
Location

Klovska (Ukrainian: Кловська,) is a station on Kyiv Metro's Syretsko–Pecherska line. Originally the station was a temporary terminus of the line between its opening date 31 December 1989 and prior to the expansion of the line to Vydubychi in December 1991.

Designed by architects A. Krushinskiy, L. Kachalova, O. Cherevko and M. Solyanyk the station is a standard pylon trivault, but with aesthetics resembling the metallic Prague Metro stations, rather than the traditional marble-clad Soviet ones. The emphasis was to give the station monumentalism, which is achieved by giving a bright high contrast gleam to the appearance. The vault ceilings are covered by set of green aluminium planes. Highly contrasting with this are the black niches which hold a line of powerful fluorescent lighting elements. White marble is used for the walls.

It is only speculation that the marble artwork at the end of the station and the plant cell shaped pylons have any connation to Biology and thus to the station's original name Mechnikova (Мечникова) after the famous biologist Ilya Mechnikov. In 1992 however the station was renamed after the Klov district of Kyiv where it is situated. Its location still in the city centre, with its single underground vestibule located under the Mechnikova street junction which not being a major transport hub and purely a residential area means that despite the nearly two decades of operation, its passenger traffic daily is only 12.2 thousand. This is evidenced by the fact that the grey granite floor still retains its original polish enhancing the ambient image of the station.

Behind the station is a turnback which was used for reversal during its terminus days, but the tunnel continues all the way to the same arrangement behind the Maidan Nezalezhnosti station of the Obolonsko–Teremkivska Line this service branch was used extensively right up to 2007 when the Syretsko-Pecherska Line relied upon the Obolon depot, and trains going to and from would pass Klovska first. After the opening of the Chervony Khutir depot in 2007, the intensity of this kind of traffic dropped.

Just like all metro stations in Kyiv, Klovska station was closed on 24 February 2022 due to the Russian invasion of Ukraine. It was reopened on 16 May 2022.

== Gallery ==
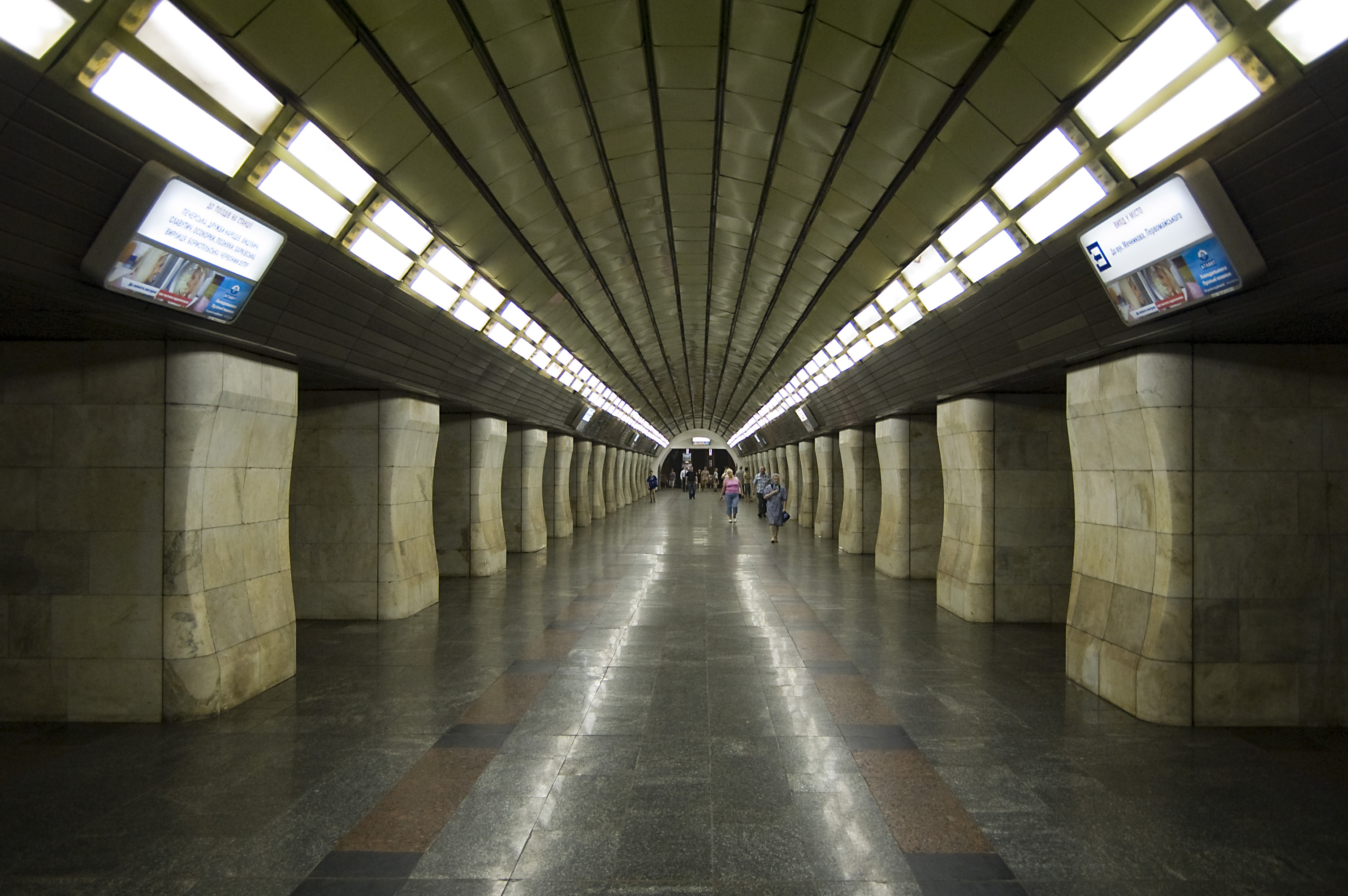
Central hall

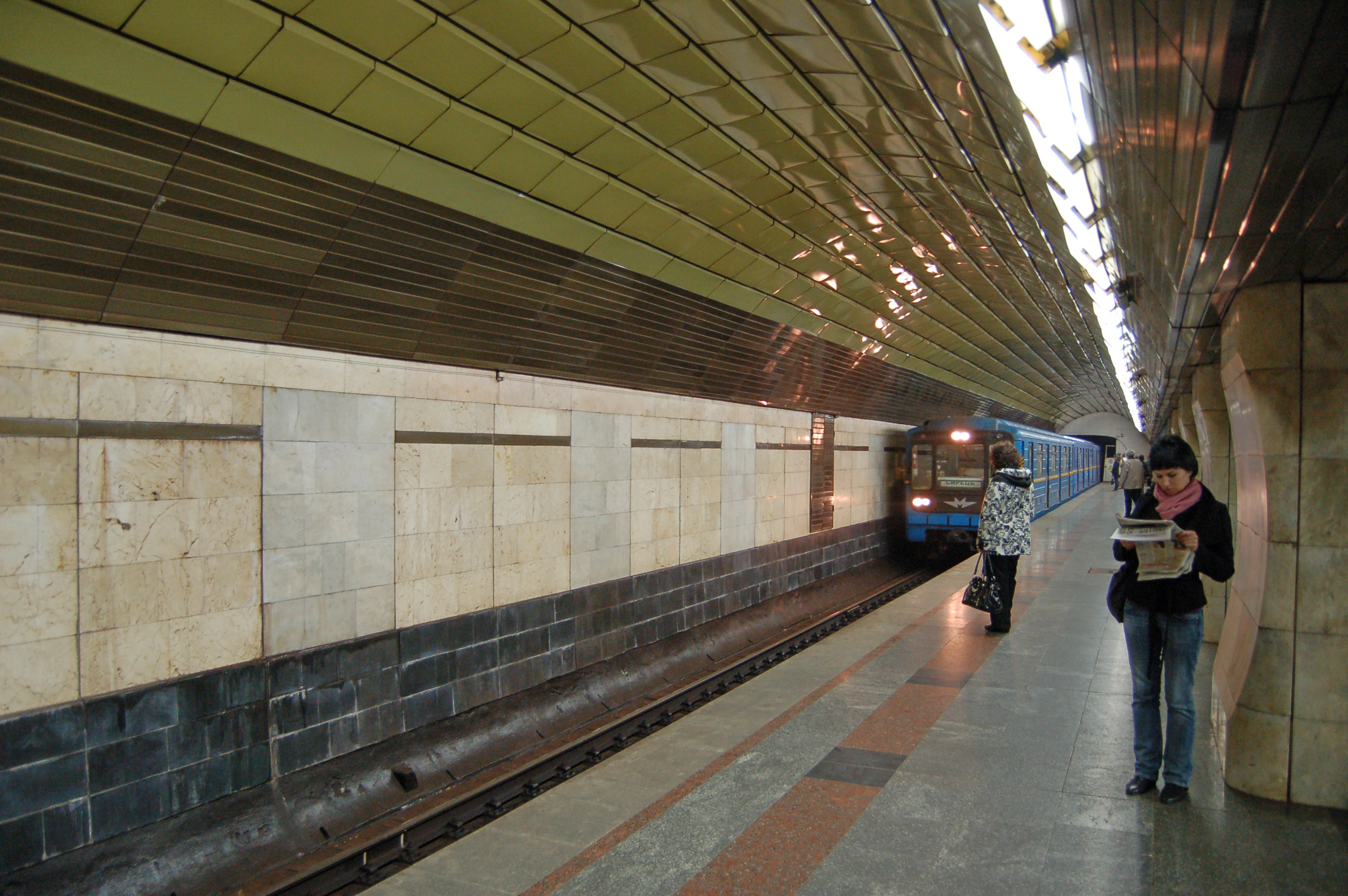
Platform

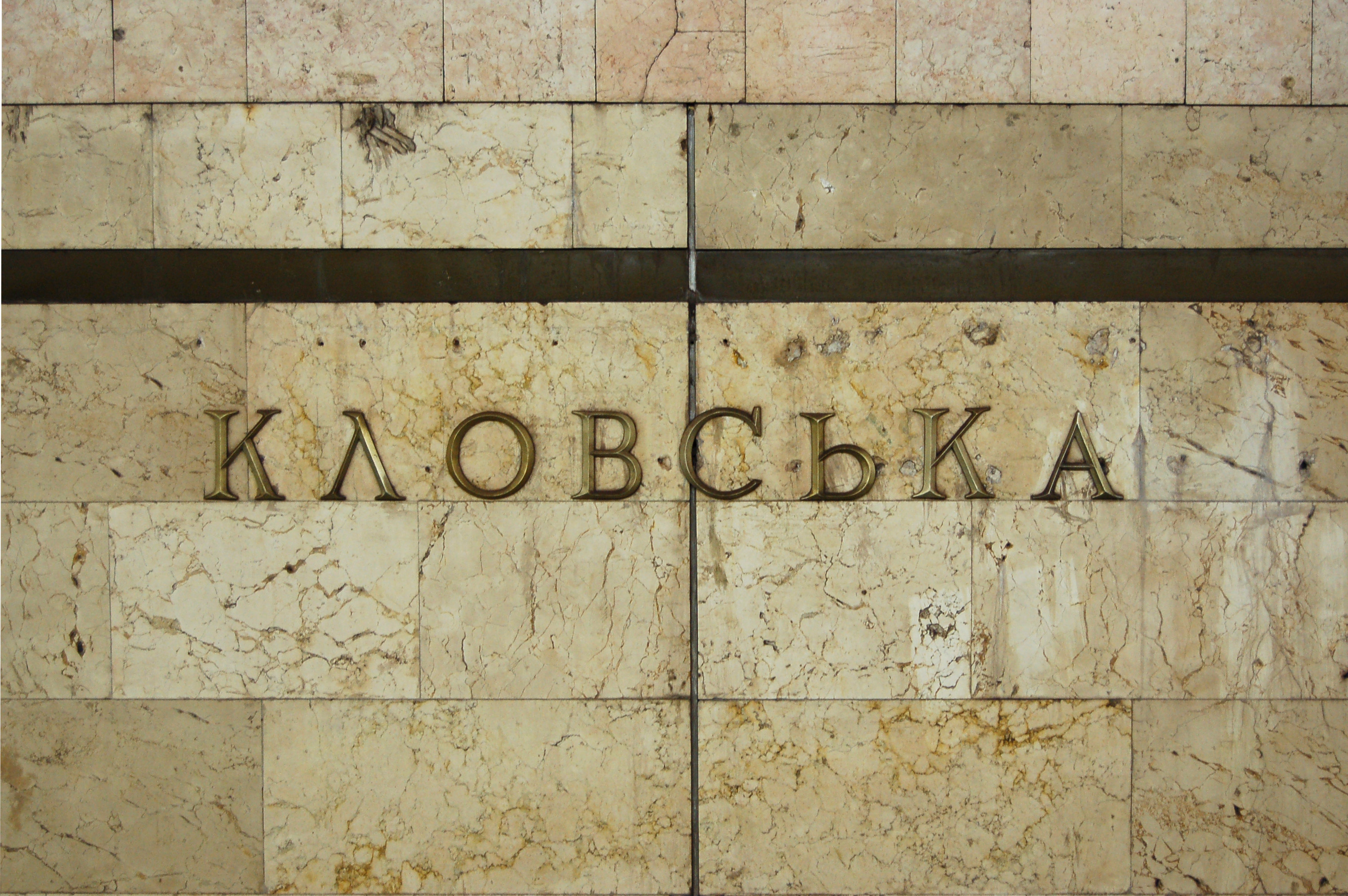
Station name

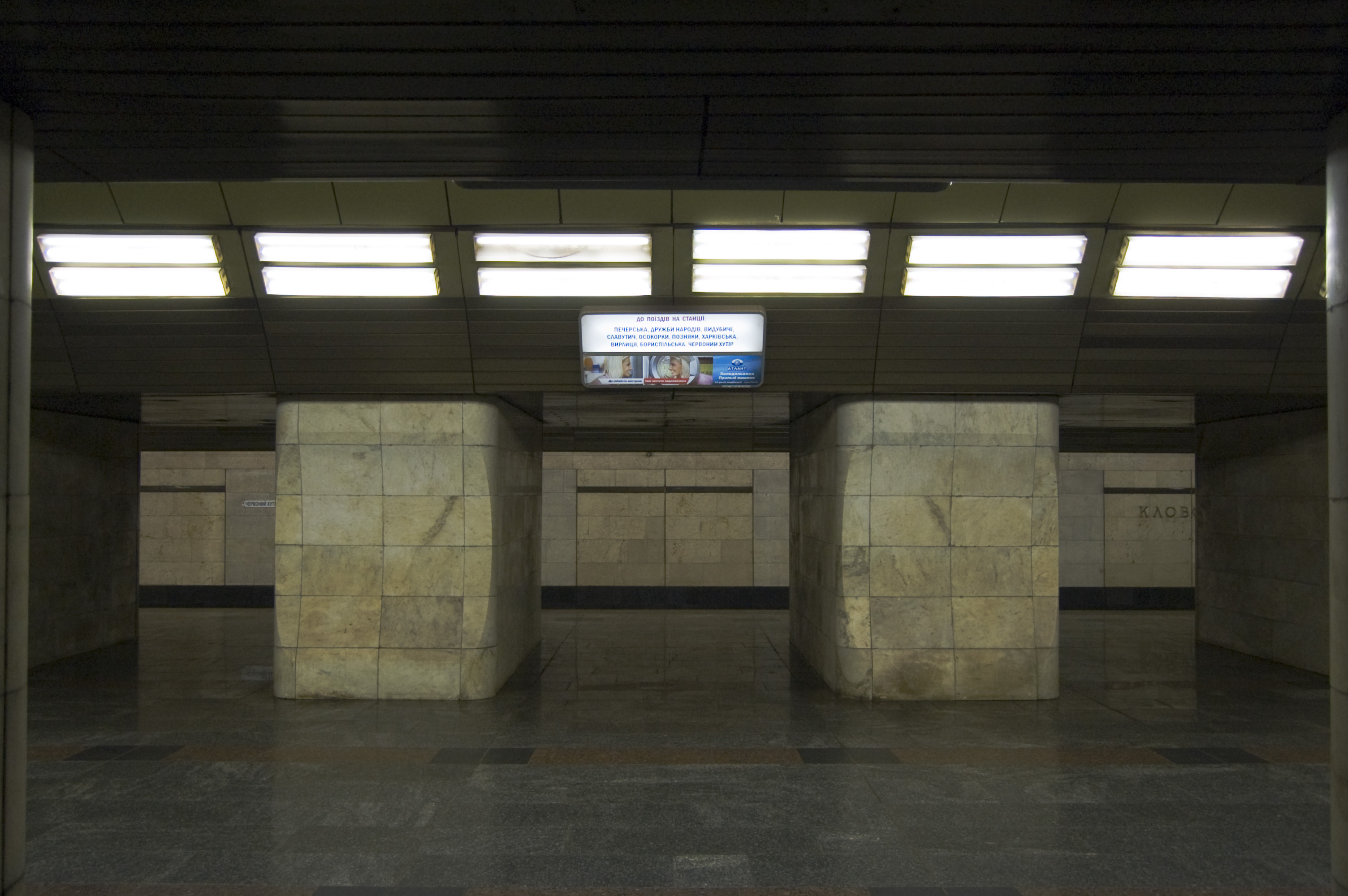
Station

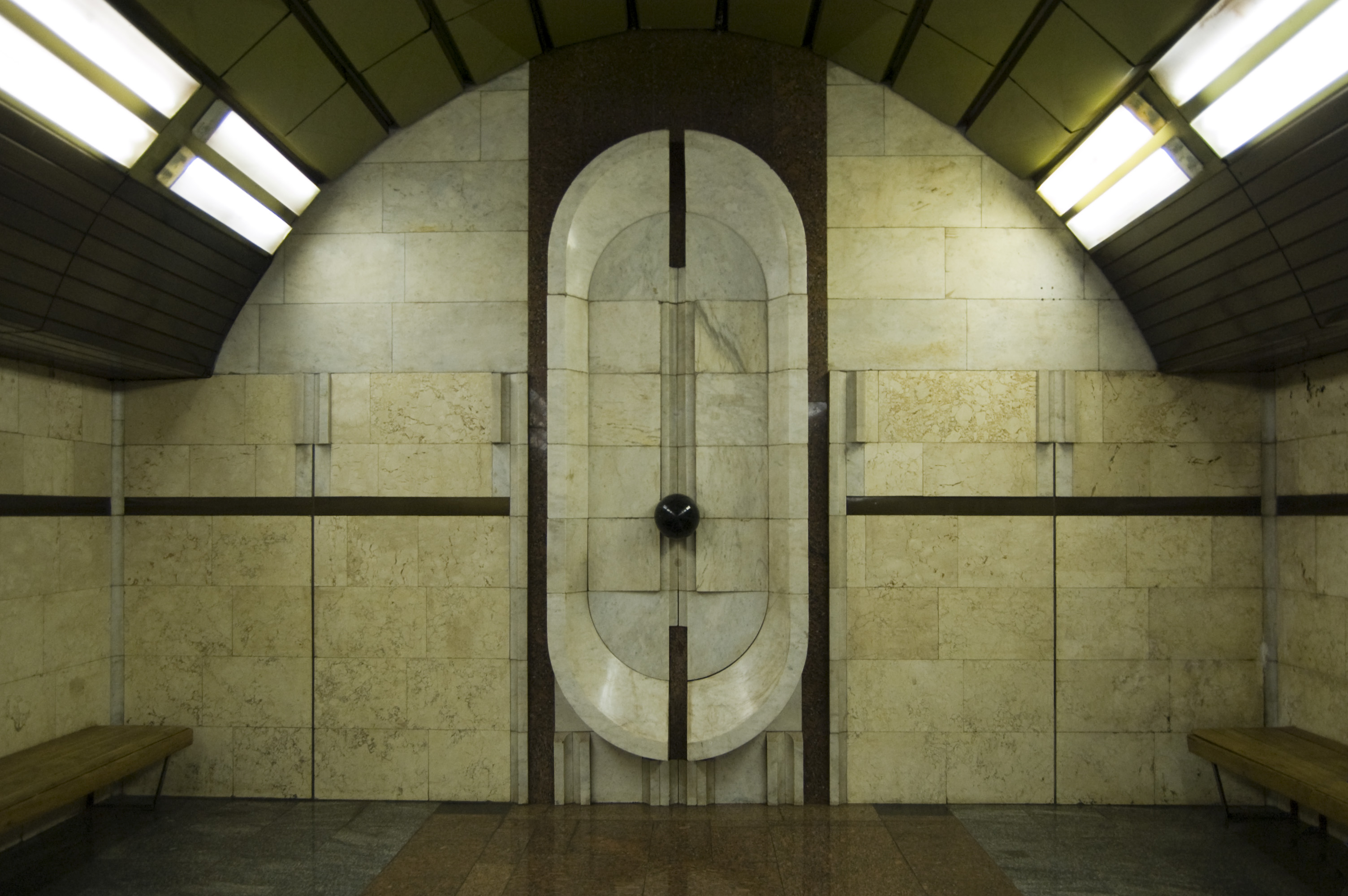
Station
