= Syretsko–Pecherska line =

Metro line of Kyiv

Overview
- Locale: Kyiv, Ukraine
- Termini: Syrets; Chervonyi Khutir
- Stations: 16

Service
- Type: Rapid transit
- System: Kyiv Metro
- Operator(s): Kyivskyi Metropoliten

History
- Opened: December 31, 1989; 36 years ago
- Last extension: 2008

Technical
- Line length: 23.86 km (14.83 mi)
- Track gauge: 1,520 mm (4 ft 11 27/32 in)
- Electrification: 825 V DC (third rail)

The map of the Kyiv Metro system. Sviatoshynsko–Brovarska line Obolonsko–Teremkivska Line Syretsko–Pecherska line Podilsko-Vyhurivska line Livoberezhna line

The Syretsko–Pecherska line (Ukrainian: Сирецько-Печерська лінія, Syrets'ko-Pechers'ka liniia) is the third line of the Kyiv Metro, first opened in 1989. It extends the metro system southeast along the right bank of the Dnieper River before crossing it on a covered bridge and then east from there. The northern section extends further northwestwards. The line is one of the newest and shows some post-independence decorative motifs. Technically, it is also a great development, with most of the platforms longer and wider than older sections and with some stations having provision for disabled access. This line is coloured green in the maps.

== Stations ==
1. Syrets
2. Dorohozhychi
3. Lukianivska
4. Lvivska Brama
5. Zoloti Vorota → Teatralna
6. Palats Sportu → Ploshcha Ukrainskykh Heroiv
7. Klovska
8. Pecherska
9. Zvirynetska
10. Vydubychi
11. Telychka
12. Slavutych
13. Osokorky
14. Pozniaky
15. Kharkivska
16. Vyrlytsia
17. Boryspilska
18. Chervonyi Khutir

== Timeline ==
Segment	Date opened	Length
Zoloti Vorota–Klovska	December 31, 1989	1.92 km
Klovska–Vydubychi	December 30, 1991	4.34 km
Vydubychi–Osokorky	December 30, 1992	4.20 km
Osokorky–Kharkivska	December 28, 1994	2.61 km
Zoloti Vorota–Lukianivska	December 30, 1996	3.11 km
Pecherska	December 27, 1997	N/A
Lukianivska–Dorohozhychi	March 3, 2000	2.67 km
Dorohozhychi–Syrets	October 14, 2004	1.56 km
Kharkivska–Boryspilska	August 23, 2005	2.36 km
Vyrlytsia	March 4, 2006	N/A
Boryspilska–Chervonyi Khutir	May 23, 2008	1.09 km
Total:	16 stations	23.86 km

In addition, there is an unfinished station named Lvivska Brama between Lukianivska and Zoloti Vorota and a derelict Telychka station, located between Vydubychi and Slavutych.

== Name changes ==
Station	Previous name(s)	Years
Klovska	Mechnikova	1989-1992
Zvirynetska	Druzhby Narodiv	1991-2023

== Transfers ==
#	Transfer to	At
	Sviatoshynsko–Brovarska line	Zoloti Vorota
	Obolonsko–Teremkivska line	Palats Sportu

== Rolling stock ==
Initially the line shared the Obolon (№ 2) depot with the Obolonsko–Teremkivska line. On August 23, 2007, construction of the dedicated Kharkivska (№ 3) depot (tracks connection extended from its Chervonyi Khutir terminus) was complete, to which the Syretsko–Pecherska line trains have been transferred. 27 five-carriage trains are assigned to this line. Most of them are of type 81-717.5/714.5, built in the late 1980's. But also some trains of type 81-540.2K/541.2K and the 81-7021/7022 (built from 2005 to 2009).

== Recent developments and future plans ==
=== Extensions ===
On the far end of the Pechersk radius, a project had existed to bring the line from its current terminus Chervonyi Khutir to the Darnytsia station of the Sviatoshynsko–Brovarska line with six stations and one depot. This extension would connect the new Darnytsia Railway Station and also create a major redevelopment into the eastern districts of Kyiv. The stations include: Promyslova, Vulytsia Horbunova, Darnytskyi Vokzal, Prazka, Dranytska Ploscha and Darnytsia. According to the General Plan of Kyiv until 2025, this extension is no longer considered.

On the opposite end of the line, on the Syrets radius, another extension with the stations Mostytska, Varshavska (earlier known as Prospekt Pravdy), Vynohradar and Marshala Hrechka (earlier known as Synioozerna) were to open by 2020, along with a new depot. This extension will bring the line to the city's northwestern borders and will connect the distant neighbourhood of Vynohradar. In November 2018 Kyiv Metro signed a contract to build the Mostytska and Varshavska subway stations and a branch line toward the Vynohradar station; the deadline for completion was set for 2021. In August 2020 Kyiv mayor Vitali Klitschko promised to complete construction of the two new metro stations by the end of 2021. On 1 February 2021 he stated that they will be opened by the summer of 2021. On 8 July 2021 Kyiv Metro stated that the construction of the new metro stations Mostytska and Varshavska was on schedule would open by the end of 2021. It was added that the city and the subway required the contractor to meet construction deadlines and complete all planned works on time (as planned - by the end of 2021), unless the Chamber of Commerce agreed on the existence of force majeure that would slow down the works. Early September 2021 the Chamber of Commerce agreed there was such and the expiration of the contract with the Kyiv Metro was to be postponed from November 2021 to May 2023.

On 18 May 2023 Mayor Klitschko stated that the construction of metro in Vynohradar was continuing, during the Russian invasion of Ukraine ongoing since 24 February 2022. On the same day the future new metro station Prospekt Pravdy was, by the Kyiv City Council, renamed to Varshavska (as part of a derussification campaign following the 2022 Russian invasion of Ukraine).

=== Ghost stations ===
One of the most notable facts that the line is known for is that stations for which the construction had begun were deliberately passed over for later openings. This happened often with the lack of financing, but the need for continuing to extend the system. One of these stations were Pecherska which opened six years after the extension which carried it (Klovska-Vydubychi). At present there are three stations that remain unfinished on the line, with various prospects of opening.

Lvivska Brama is the first of such, a deep underground station that exists in a half-built state, with the underground part structurally complete and even partially decorated, and lacking an escalator tunnel and a lobby. For many years it appeared on the map as under-construction with no actual work taking place, the scheduled opening year being shifted perpetually.

Telychka is another unopened station, on the right bank of the Dnieper River, that is sealed off completely, with no illumination at most times, and has remained such since the tunnels were built back in 1990. It was not opened because there was no need for it, since the Lower Telychka industrial area (which the station was planned to serve) quickly deteriorated with the end of the Soviet Union. However, there is a proposed re-development plan of the area and, as the station is sub-surface and structurally complete, it will not be difficult to finish and open the station should a need arise.

Finally, between Lukianivska and Dorohozhychi, a provision exists for another deep station, the project name for which is Vulytsia Hertsena (Hertzen street). Currently, there are no plans to complete the station at all, due to the difficulty in building a deep-level station on an existing stretch being very costly, as well as impractical, particularly in the light of more important projects such as Podilsko–Voskresenska and Livoberezhna lines, which will not be completed until 2025 at the least.

All three stations satisfy a regulatory requirement of having stations (including ghost ones, capable of serving as emergency exits or fire shelters) no farther than 2000 m (1¼ mi) apart.

Also, these stations host traction substations, ventilation and drainage equipment as all ordinary stations do. Currently, only Lvivska Brama is staffed 24/7 with a station agent, the others being visited by maintenance personnel only occasionally.
