= Slavutych (Kyiv Metro) =

Kyiv Metro Station

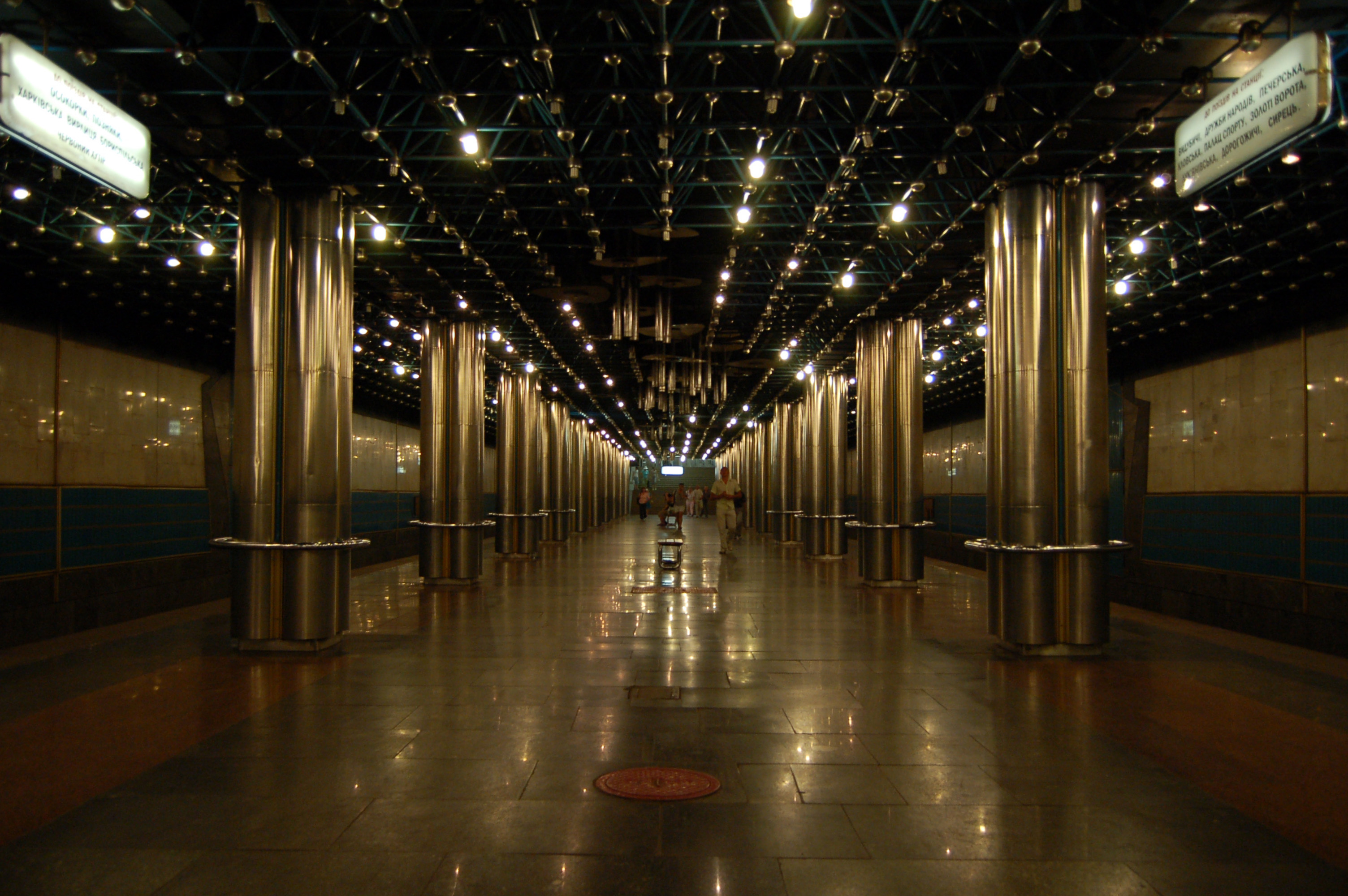

General information
- Location: Darnytskyi District; Kyiv; Ukraine
- Coordinates: 50°23′39″N 30°36′15″E
- System: Kyiv Metro station
- Owner: Kyiv Metro
- Line: Syretsko–Pecherska line
- Platforms: 1
- Tracks: 2

Construction
- Structure type: underground
- Platform levels: 1

Other information
- Station code: 321

History
- Opened: 30 December 1992

Services
Preceding station	Kyiv Metro	Following station
Vydubychi towards Syrets	Syretsko–Pecherska line	Osokorky towards Chervonyi Khutir
Location

Slavutych (Ukrainian: Славутич,) is a station on Kyiv Metro's Syretsko–Pecherska line. It is situated between Vydubychi and Osokorky stations and was opened on 30 December 1992.

The station was designed by architect Alyoshkin. Slavutych station has 2 entrances. This station is situated on Mykoly Bazhana Avenue near the Southern Metro Bridge. This station is situated near the Dnieper river, Slavutych being an old name of the river.

Slavutych station is served by trains from 05:43hrs to 00:12hrs.
