= Vydubychi (Kyiv Metro) =

Kyiv Metro Station

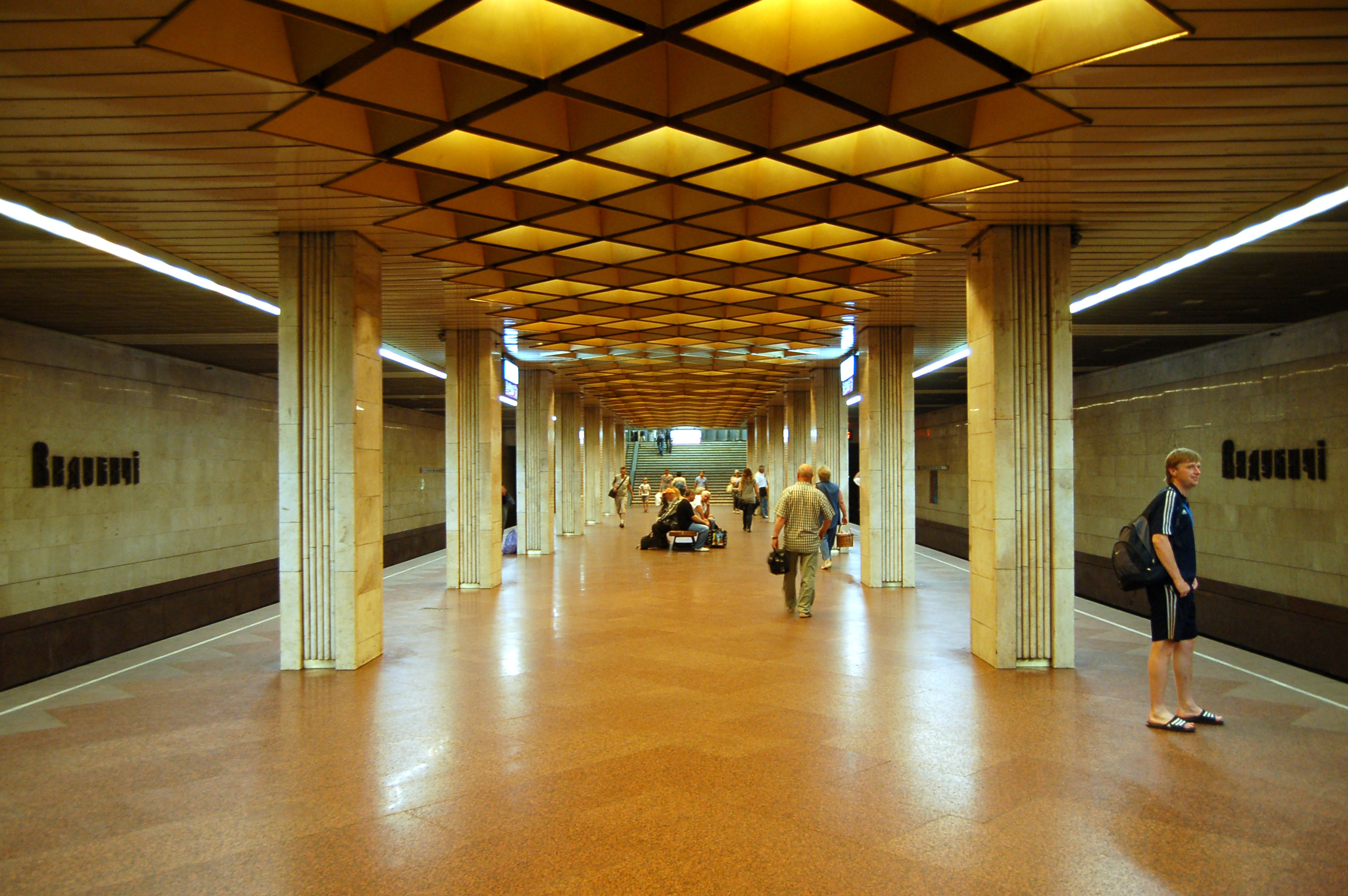

General information
- Location: Holosiivskyi District; Kyiv; Ukraine
- Coordinates: 50°24′8″N 30°33′39″E
- System: Kyiv Metro station
- Owner: Kyiv Metro
- Line: Syretsko–Pecherska line
- Platforms: 1
- Tracks: 2

Construction
- Structure type: underground
- Platform levels: 1

Other information
- Station code: 319

History
- Opened: 30 December 1991

Services
Preceding station	Kyiv Metro	Following station
Zvirynetska towards Syrets	Syretsko–Pecherska line	Slavutych towards Chervonyi Khutir
Location

Vydubychi (Ukrainian: Видубичі,) is a station of Kyiv Metro's Syretsko-Pecherska Line. It is situated between Zvirynetska and Slavutych stations. This station was opened on 30 December 1991.

Vydubychi station was designed by architects T. Tselikovska.

The station has 2 entrances. One of them is situated in underground passage under the crossing of Saperno-Slobidska street and Naddniprianske shose. Another is situated near the bus station Vydubychi, the Vydubychi railway station of the Kyiv Urban Electric Train and the Vydubychi-Trypilski railway station. The second entrance was built in 2001.

Vydubychi station works from 05:42 to 00:15.
