= Dorohozhychi (Kyiv Metro) =

Kyiv Metro Station

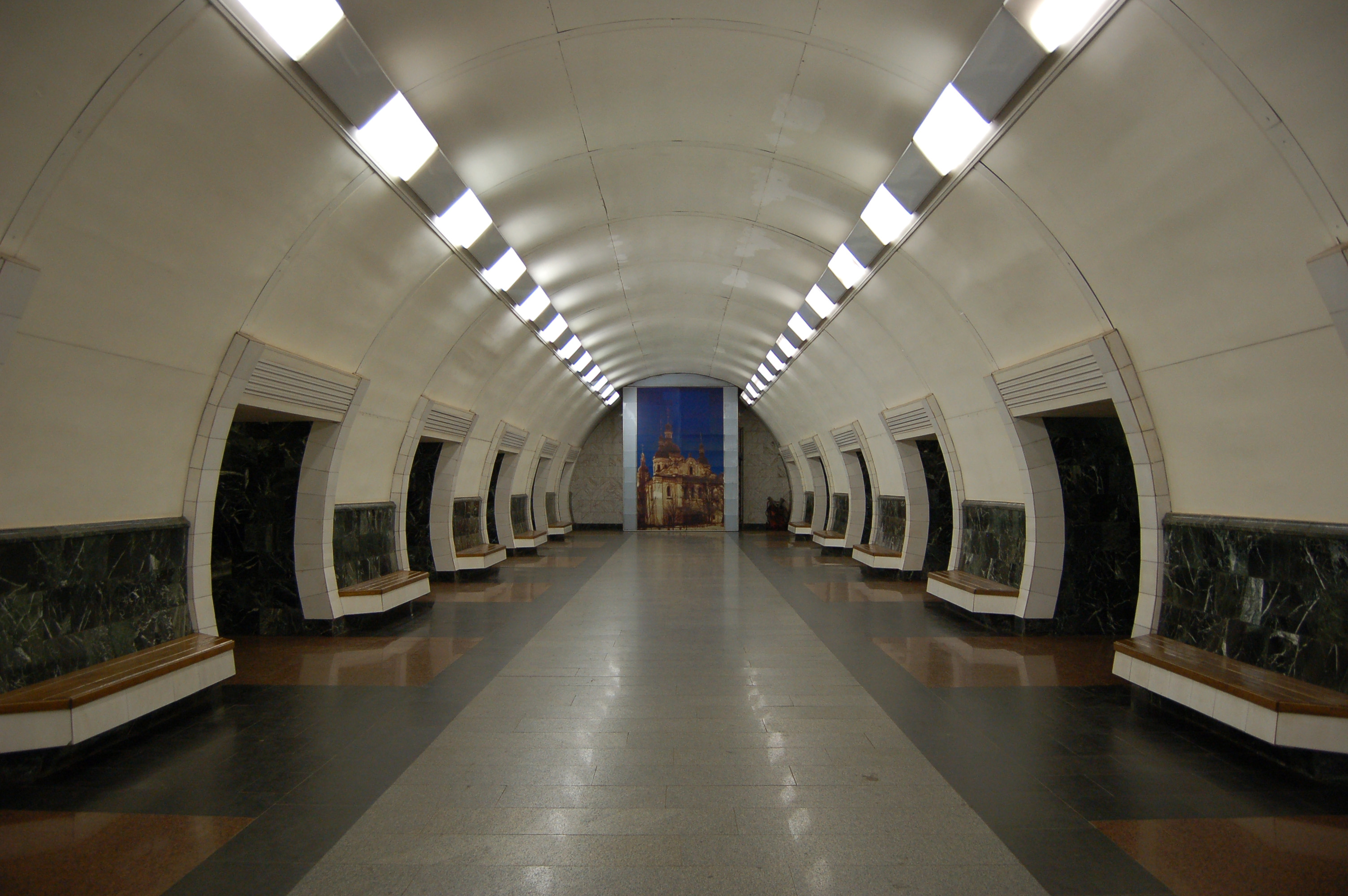
- Station Hall

General information
- Location: Shevchenkivskyi District; Kyiv; Ukraine
- Coordinates: 50°28′25″N 30°26′57″E
- System: Kyiv Metro station
- Owner: Kyiv Metro
- Line: Syretsko–Pecherska line
- Platforms: 1
- Tracks: 2

Construction
- Structure type: underground
- Platform levels: 1

Other information
- Station code: 311

History
- Opened: 30 March 2000

Services
Preceding station	Kyiv Metro	Following station
Syrets Terminus	Syretsko–Pecherska line	Lukianivska towards Chervonyi Khutir
Location

Dorohozhychi (Ukrainian: Дорогожичі,) is a Kyiv Metro station on the Syretsko-Pecherska Line. Opened on 30 March 2000, the station represents the second extension of the Syretsky radius to the northwest. It is located nearby the territory of Babyn Yar.

The station, designed by architects V. Gnevyshev, N.Aloshkin and T.Tselikovska presents itself as a deep-level pylon trivault. In the design, the shape of the vaults is made dominant, by continuing their curvature all the way to the floor level. This makes the overall appearance of the station lacking pylons, but instead there are even, geometric openings which offer passageways to the adjacent platform vaults. The portals of the openings are punctuated with indents that run along their edges. The station contains a rich combination of decorative materials. Green marble is used for the sides of the passageways, and the lower part of the pylons. White marble is used for the station walls and indents along the portal edges. The ceilings are made from aluminium planes that run perpendicular to the platform length. Lighting comes from a single (platform halls) or double (central) rows of continuous fluorescent elements that are neatly covered by plastic. Floor is riveted with red granite on the platforms and grey granite in the centre of the central hall. In the back end of the station, is a decorative image of a church in a Ukrainian Baroque style. Dorohozhychi is one of the last stations to be built in what is known as the rich post-Soviet decoration. This was done deliberately to mark the transition of the Kyiv Metro into the 21st century, as the large use of marble, wooden benches and the large empty space were all considered to be archaic for contemporary station design. All subsequent stations turned to more aesthetic high-tech themes.

The station has one underground vestibule which is located in the middle of the Syrets district on the intersection of the Ilyenko and Teliha streets. During daytime, two glazed domes, provide daylight inside. There are additional escalators between the vestibule and the street level. During the construction of the extension from Lukianivska a provision for another station, Vulytsia Hertsena was left for further completion.
