= Maidan Nezalezhnosti (Kyiv Metro) =

Kyiv Metro Station

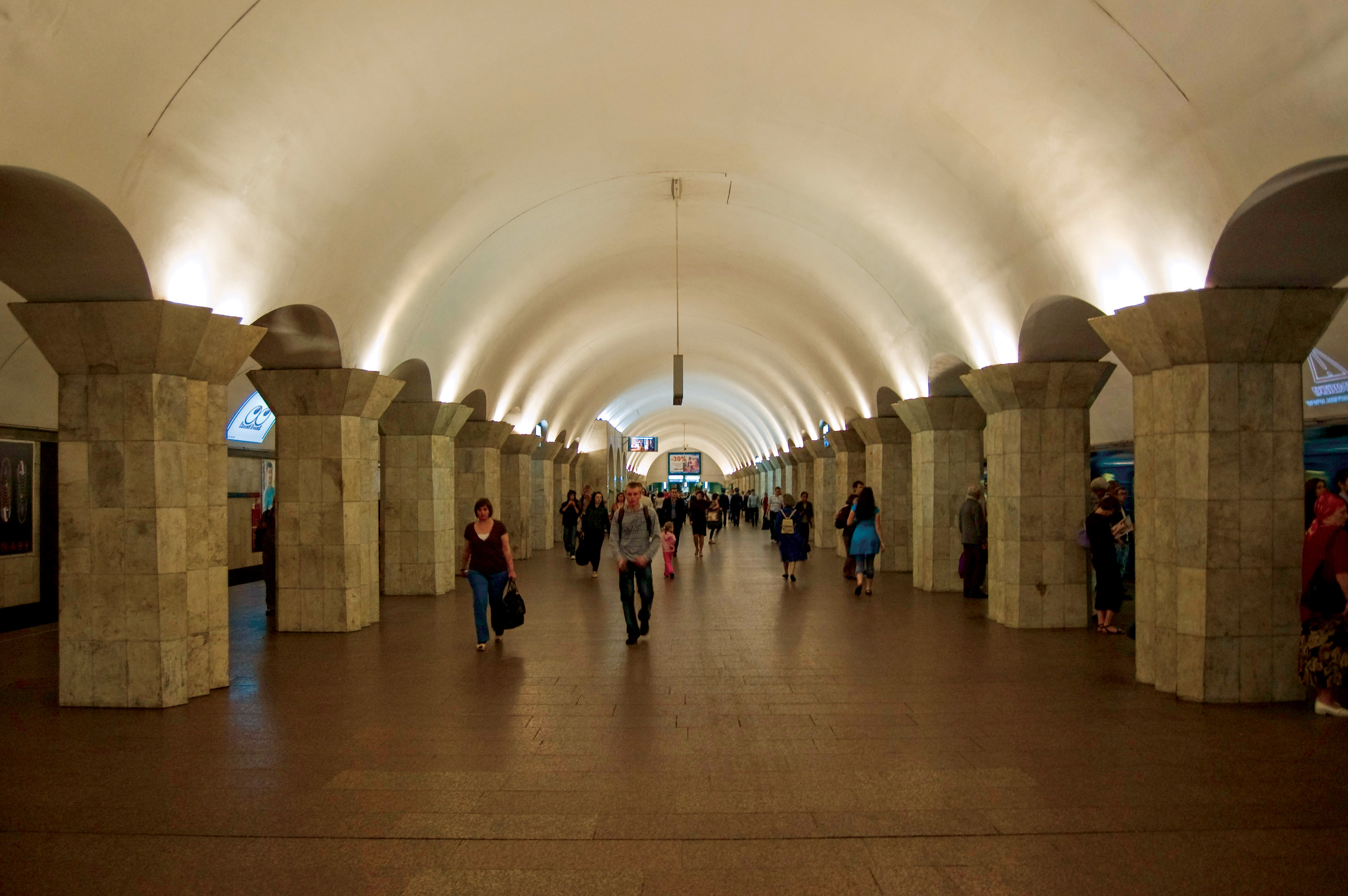
- The Station Hall

General information
- Location: Pecherskyi District; Kyiv; Ukraine
- Coordinates: 50°27′00″N 30°31′28″E
- System: Kyiv Metro station
- Owner: Kyiv Metro
- Line: Obolonsko–Teremkivska line
- Platforms: 1
- Tracks: 2

Construction
- Structure type: Underground
- Platform levels: 1

Other information
- Station code: 217

History
- Opened: 17 December 1976

Services
Preceding station	Kyiv Metro	Following station
Poshtova Ploshcha towards Heroiv Dnipra	Obolonsko–Teremkivska line	Ploshcha Ukrainskykh Heroiv towards Teremky
Teatralna towards Akademmistechko	Sviatoshynsko–Brovarska line transfer at Khreshchatyk	Arsenalna towards Lisova
Location

Maidan Nezalezhnosti (Ukrainian: Майдан Незалежності,) is a station on the Obolonsko–Teremkivska line of the Kyiv Metro system that serves Kyiv, in Ukraine. The station was opened on 17 December 1976, and is named after Kyiv's Maidan Nezalezhnosti (Independence Square) on the Khreshchatyk street. It was designed by N. Kolomiiets, I. Maslenkov, M. Syrkyn, and F. Zaremba.

The station was formerly known as Ploshcha Kalinina, but was renamed a year after its opening to Ploshcha Zhovtnevoii Revoliutsii (Ukrainian: Площа Жовтневої революції). Maidan Nezalezhnosti forms a station complex with a transfer section with the neighbouring Khreshchatyk station on the Sviatoshynsko-Brovarska Line.

The station is laid deep underground and consists of a central hall with porticoes. The lamps which light the station are hidden in the niches between the columns and the walls.

The station was used as the venue for Vidbir 2023, Ukraine's national selection for Eurovision 2023 in Liverpool.
