= Syrets (Kyiv Metro) =

Kyiv Metro Station

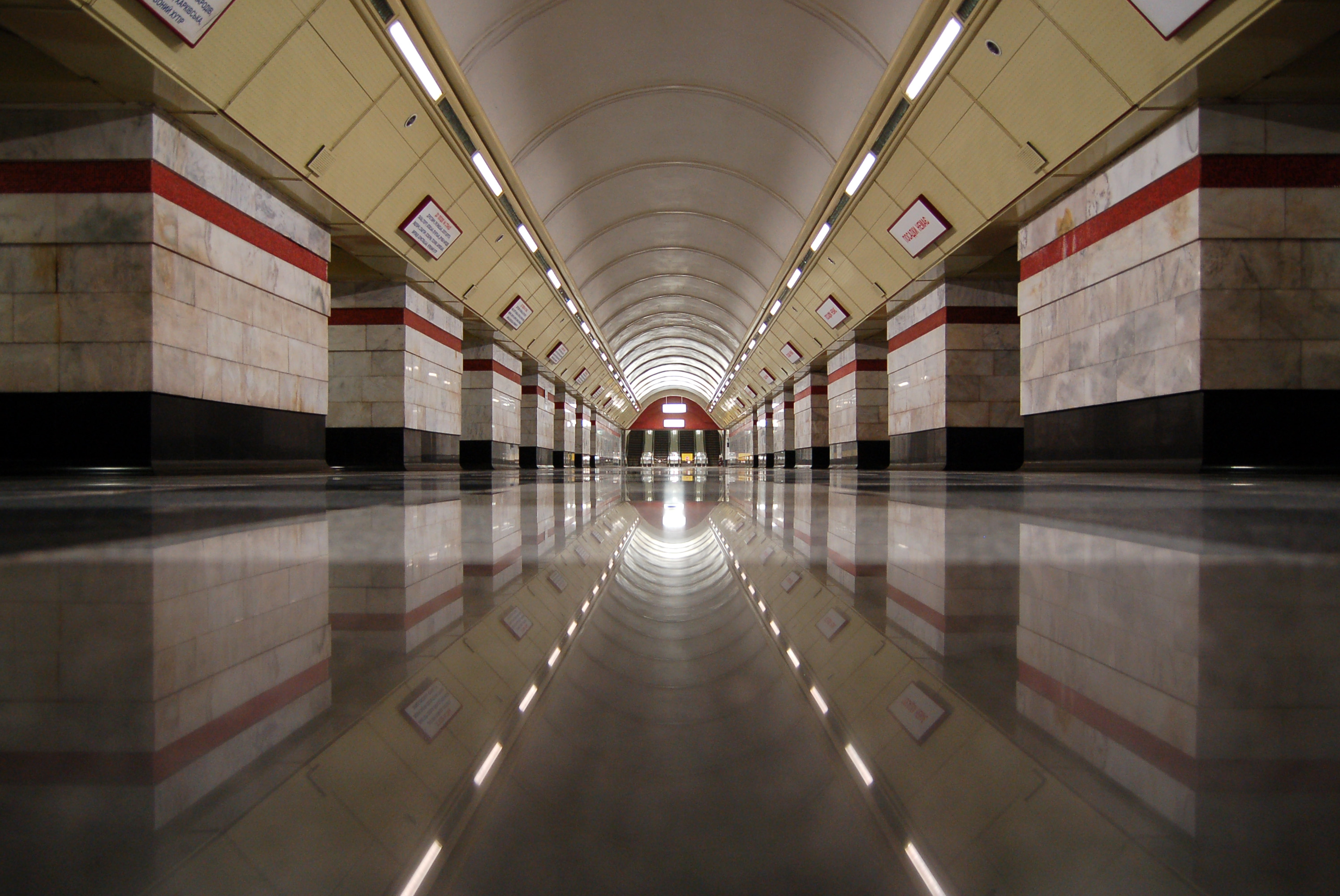
- Station Hall

General information
- Location: Shevchenkivskyi District; Kyiv; Ukraine
- Coordinates: 50°28′35″N 30°25′51″E
- System: Kyiv Metro station
- Owner: Kyiv Metro
- Line: Syretsko–Pecherska line
- Platforms: 1
- Tracks: 2

Construction
- Structure type: underground
- Platform levels: 1

Other information
- Station code: 310

History
- Opened: 14 October 2004

Services
Preceding station	Kyiv Metro	Following station
Terminus	Syretsko–Pecherska line	Dorohozhychi towards Chervonyi Khutir
Location

Syrets (Ukrainian: Сирець,) is a Kyiv Metro station on the Syretsko–Pecherska line. Opened in 2004, it is the northwestern terminus. Traditionally all of the Metro stations in Kyiv were built in several stages including a few stations each (sometimes delivered in various segments). The Syretsky radius was started in the early 1990s, in the midst of economic hardships as a result of which, not only was it many years behind schedule it was also very slow to open new stations.

Syrets was originally to be the fifth station on the radius, but as Lvivska Brama never opened and Vulytsia Hertsena was left as a provision, it became the third on the radius when it opened to the public on 14 October 2004. The station is not in the vicinity of houses, but is right next to the Syrets railway platform, and as a result most of its passengers are commuters coming from further northwestern districts of the city rather than local residents (which was its original intention).

Designed by architect T. Tselikovskaya, the station is a standard design deep level pylon trivault, but the first in Kyiv to exhibit a new high-tech approach to the design of the stations, over the previous vivid decorations that were inherited from the Soviet times. As a result, the station's walls and the perfectly square pylons are faced with grey marble, and the floor with red and grey granite. Contrasting to that are bright red metallic stripes that run on the lower side of the station wall and on the pylon and intervault wall of the platform and central hall. The niche between the upper vault and the pylon space is done out of beige mettaloplastic (which also has the fluorescent lighting elements) and the upper vaults are covered in plastic planes. In the far end of the central hall, is a neatly arranged artwork based on the same metallic themes.

The station has a large surface vestibule on the corner between the Kotovsky and Stetsenko/Schuseva streets (the latter changes name as it passes under the railway flyover). A four-escalator descent connects it to the station hall.

On 27 February 2022 during the Russian invasion of Ukraine, a Russian convoy attempted to set up a temporary base at Syrets, which was met with a deadly confrontation with Ukrainian troops. Russian troops also fired at a Ukrainian military bus, creating an unknown amount of casualties.

== See also ==
- Mostytska (Kyiv Metro)
- Syrets concentration camp
