= Kharkivska Square =

Square in Kyiv, Ukraine

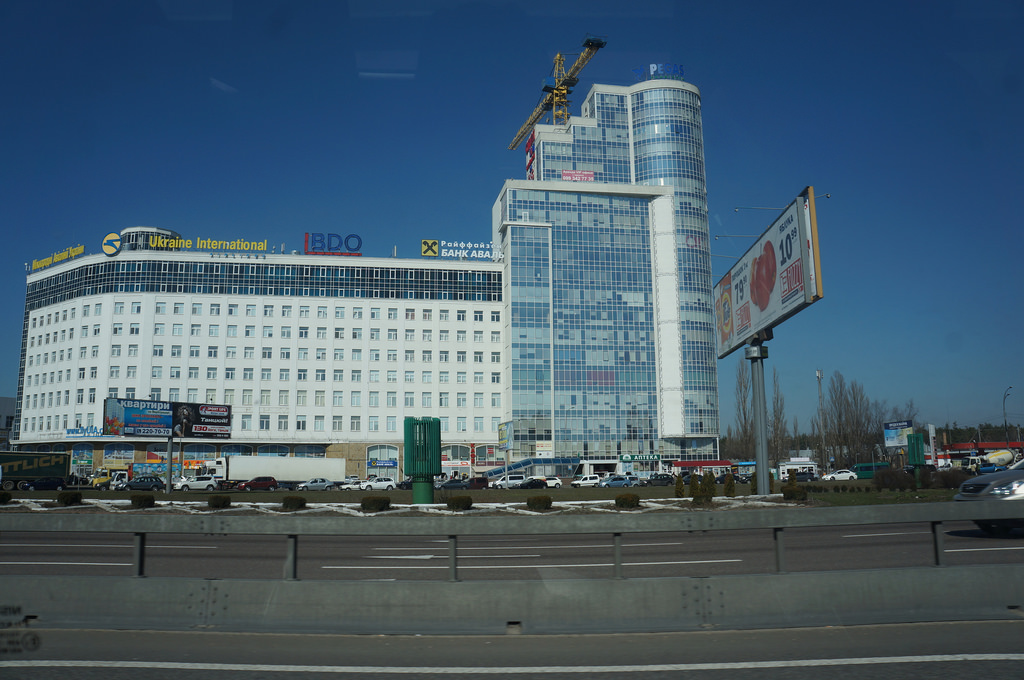
- Interactive map of Kharkivska Square
- Native name: Ukrainian: Харківська площа
- Type: square
- Location: Darnytskyi District, Kyiv
- Postal code: 02088
- Nearest metro station: Boryspilska metro station
- Coordinates: 50.4024°N 30.6831°E

Kharkivska Square is a square in the Darnytskyi District of Kyiv in Chervonyi Khutir. It is located between Kharkiv Highway, Tashkentska Street, Boryspil Highway, Svitla Street, Kollektorna Street and Mykola Bazhan Avenue.

== History ==
It came into being and was named in the early 1980s. In 2005 there were plans to reconstruct the square in connection with the construction of Boryspilska metro station, but due to lack of funds the reconstruction was postponed. Nevertheless, the square was reconstructed, a road was built through the central flowerbed, which connected Boryspil highway to Mykola Bazhan Avenue to facilitate traffic into the city. The Boryspilska metro station was opened on 23 August 2005.

== Renovation project ==
According to the State Register of Court Decisions, on May 18, 2007, an agreement No. 049-13 / i / 20 for the comprehensive reconstruction of Kharkiv Square with the construction of a transport interchange at different levels of Kharkiv Square in conjunction with the metro station, the location of the bus station, shopping malls and parking lots.

According to the terms of the agreement, the reconstruction of the area and the construction of these investment objects were to be carried out on land within the inner circle of the transport interchange on Kharkiv Square and the adjacent territory, bounded by Collectorna and Svitla streets. The total approximate area of the said site was 4.6 ha. This land, in accordance with the investment agreement, was to be leased by the Kyiv City Council to Kyiv Terminal LLC for 25 years.

In April 2007, the then First Deputy Head of the Kyiv City State Administration, Denis Bass, reported that the investor was promised the opportunity to build a hotel complex, an office and exhibition center, a parking lot for 500 cars, retail and warehouse premises, a restaurant, crossings and a bus station on Kharkiv Square instead of a transport interchange. At that time, the estimated cost of the investment project was 830 million hryvnia (about $165 million at the then exchange rate). Subsequently, throughout the year, the Kyiv City Council and the Kyiv City State Administration did not make any attempts to transfer the specified land to the investor for the implementation of the investment agreement.

In this regard, in the spring of 2008, Kyiv Terminal LLC filed a lawsuit with the Kyiv Economic Court against the Kyiv City Council and the Main Department of Land Resources of the Kyiv City State Administration to recognize the land lease agreement as concluded (case No. 32/225). On May 23, 2008, this court granted the investor's claims. Thus, a lease agreement for 9 plots on Kharkiv Square with a total area of 7.74 hectares was recognized as concluded (the investor was given land that could be used for the passage of special equipment, storage of building materials, etc.). The intended purpose of this land is “for the complex reconstruction of Kharkiv Square with the construction of a transport interchange at different levels on Kharkiv Square in conjunction with the metro station, the placement of a bus station, shopping malls and a parking lot”. The lease terms for these plots were different: 4 plots with a total area of 4.76 hectares were leased to Kyiv Terminal LLC for 25 years, and 5 plots with a total area of 2.98 ha - for 5 years (it seems that these are just the same plots, which the authorities had to additionally transfer). On July 1, 2008, in pursuance of the court decision, an appropriate lease agreement was concluded between the Kyiv City Council and Kyiv Terminal LLC.

On May 27, 2010, the Kyiv City Council, by its decision No. 912/4350, amended the said agreement. In accordance with this document, the parties agreed to change the primary obligation.

Initially, the agreement stated that the investor had to carry out the reconstruction of the land plots, and in the new version of the agreement they specifically indicated the obligation to carry out a comprehensive reconstruction of Kharkiv Square with the construction of the above-mentioned facilities. On September 14, 2010, the City Council and Kyiv Terminal LLC entered into a new version of the lease agreement.

Three years later, on October 2, 2013, the Kyiv City Council, by decision No. 64/9652, terminated the lease agreement dated September 14, 2010. The reason for this was the need to withdraw most of the land leased by the investor (area - 5.18 hectares) for its further use "in public needs". This wording implied that the city authorities decided to carry out the reconstruction of Kharkivska Square on their own and at the expense of the Kyiv budget. Also, by this decision of the City Council, it was determined that the Department of Economics and Investments of the KSCA had to consider the issue of terminating the investment agreement within a month. On December 5, 2013, an agreement was concluded between the Department of Economics and Investments of the Kyiv City State Administration, Kyiv Terminal LLC, KK Kyivavtodor and KP Kyiv Metropolitan to terminate the investment agreement No. 049-13 / i / 20 dated May 18, 2007.

However, two weeks later, on December 19, 2013, the parties entered into an additional agreement to the termination agreement. And this document, in its essence, determined further relations between the now ex-investor and the city authorities.

This agreement confirmed that the investor incurred the costs of implementing the investment agreement, and the city authorities must reimburse them. At the same time, the procedure, terms and method of compensation for losses were to be determined by the parties by concluding a special agreement on the settlement of issues related to the termination of the investment agreement. To do this, the investor had to first provide the Department of Economics and Investments of the Kyiv City State Administration with an opinion on the cost of the damage caused, prepared by the appraiser (appraisal firm).

=== Investor's losses ===
The legislation of Ukraine, namely Article 18 of the Law of Ukraine on Investment Activities, directly provides for the obligation of the authorities to compensate for the losses that the authorities, by their actions, inflicted on investors.

According to the State Register of Judgments, on December 12, 2016, Kyiv Terminal LLC received from the appraisal company - Baker Tilly Ukraine Consulting (a subsidiary of Baker Tilly International, one of the top 10 audit companies in the world — a report on the assessment of the cost of damage. This document confirmed that the non-implemented reconstruction of Kharkiv Square caused direct losses to the investor in the amount of US$24.46 million. In addition, according to the calculations of Baker Tilly Ukraine Consulting, the investor's lost profit amounted to $74.04 million. On December 16, 2016, Kyiv Terminal LLC applied to the Department of Economics and Investments of the Kyiv City State Administration with a letter on the conclusion of an agreement on the settlement of issues related to the termination of the investment agreement. Attached to this letter was the said damage assessment report.

=== Refusal of the Kyiv City State Administration from indemnification of the investor ===
On January 18, 2017, the Department of Economics and Investments of the Kyiv City State Administration refused. Kyiv Terminal LLC to conclude an agreement on the settlement of issues related to the termination of the investment agreement. The reason for this was several factors, including officials' comments on the figures in the mentioned evaluation report. Instead, the relevant department suggested that the ex-investor hold meetings with the city authorities on the amount of losses and determine the mechanism for their compensation.

Ultimately, the ex-investor and the city authorities were unable to resolve the issue of compensation for damage on a voluntary basis, in connection with which, at the end of 2018, Kyiv Terminal LLC filed a lawsuit with the Kyiv Economic Court. The company demanded to recover damages in the amount of $24.46 million and lost profits in the amount of $74.04 million from the Department of Economics and Investments of the Kyiv City State Administration. In September 2019, the court also involved the Kyiv City Council and the Kyiv City State Administration as co-defendants in this case.

One of the main arguments of Kyiv Terminal LLC was that the Department of Economics and Investments of the Kyiv City State Administration did not provide the company with an order to design an urban development facility, and the Kyiv City Council seized plots on Kharkiv Square without prior compensation for losses and losses. All this led to the termination of the implementation of the investment project, which caused the corresponding losses to the Kyiv Terminal company.

On December 23, 2019, the Commercial Court of Kyiv partially satisfied the claims of the “ex-investor” and ruled to recover jointly and severally from the Department of Economics and Investments of the Kyiv City State Administration, the Kyiv City State Administration and the Kyiv City Council funds in the amount of US$24.46 million (UAH 671.5 million at the time of filing the claim) in benefit of Kyiv Terminal LLC. The court refused to compensate for lost profits, pointing out that, despite the determination by experts of the amount of lost losses based on market indicators, such figures are of an “alleged” nature.

However, on May 27, 2021, the Northern Economic Court of Appeal satisfied the complaint of the Department of Economics and Investments of the Kyiv City State Administration, canceling the decision of the court of first instance to recover UAH 671.5 million from the capital budget. The Northern Court of Appeal erroneously applied the statute of limitations, holding that the statute of limitations should have been calculated from the moment the investor became entitled to damages, and not from the moment that right was violated. However, the limitation period begins to run from the moment of violation of the right. Therefore, the Supreme Court of Ukraine canceled the decision of the Court of Appeal and restored the rights of the investor. On October 13, 2021, the decision of the Cassation Commercial Court within the Supreme Court restored the investor's rights to compensation for losses.

In 2021, Somkhishvili turned to the British Embassy for help, and an embassy representative was present at every Supreme Court hearing.

On November 18, 2021, Tamaz Somkhishvili sent a notice of the dispute to the Cabinet of Ministers of Ukraine and a proposal to amicably resolve the investment dispute for damages in accordance with the Agreement between the Government of Ukraine and the Government of the United Kingdom of Great Britain and Northern Ireland on the promotion and mutual protection of investments.

In July 2022, Kyiv Terminal LLC proposed that the city authorities conclude an amicable agreement, according to which the company waives monetary claims, the city admits its violations in the process of implementing the investment project, and after the end of martial law, the city and the investor jointly agree on a land plot on which the investor will build an infrastructure facility at his own expense. However, the KCSA again rejected the settlement agreement.

“Both foreign and Ukrainian entrepreneurs and investors know that Ukraine has never been a country where it is easy to do business. But can Ukraine afford to remain a kind of minefield, and a wild minefield for foreign investors? Can our country afford a surge of hatred towards foreign investors? Will the incitement of this general hatred, which benefits only corruption, the continued existence of which in Ukraine is beneficial to Russia, help Ukraine defeat the aggressor and rebuild our country in the future?" Taras Dumich, partner at the international law firm Wolf Theiss, commented on the case.
