= Pozniaky (Kyiv Metro) =

Kyiv Metro Station

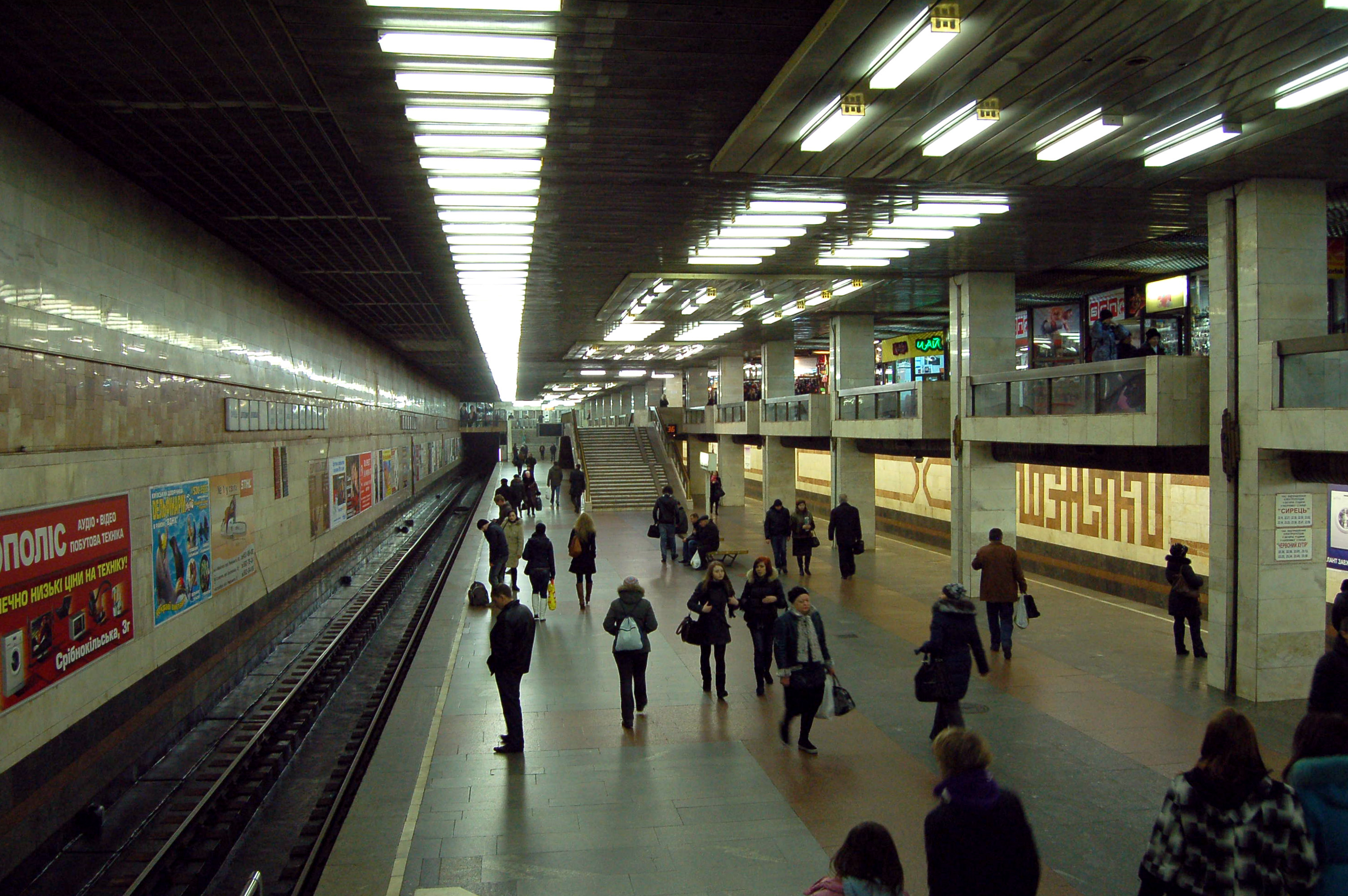

General information
- Location: Darnytskyi District; Kyiv; Ukraine
- Coordinates: 50°23′53″N 30°38′00″E
- System: Kyiv Metro station
- Owner: Kyiv Metro
- Line: Syretsko–Pecherska line
- Platforms: 1
- Tracks: 2

Construction
- Structure type: underground
- Platform levels: 1

Other information
- Station code: 323

History
- Opened: 28 December 1994

Services
Preceding station	Kyiv Metro	Following station
Osokorky towards Syrets	Syretsko–Pecherska line	Kharkivska towards Chervonyi Khutir
Location

Pozniaky (Ukrainian: Позняки,) is a station of Kyiv Metro's Syretsko–Pecherska line. It is situated between Osokorky and Kharkivska stations. This station was opened on 28 December 1994. The station is named after the nearby residential area Pozniaky.

The station was designed by architects Tselikovska, Hnievyshev and Panchenko. Pozniaky station has 2 entrances. This station is situated in the crossing of Mykoly Bazhana Avenue and Petra Hryhorenka Avenue in the Pozniaky neighborhood.

Pozniaky station operates from 05:45 to 00:04.
