= Kharkivskyi Masyv =

Kharkivskyi masyv Харківський масив
- Neighborhood of Kyiv
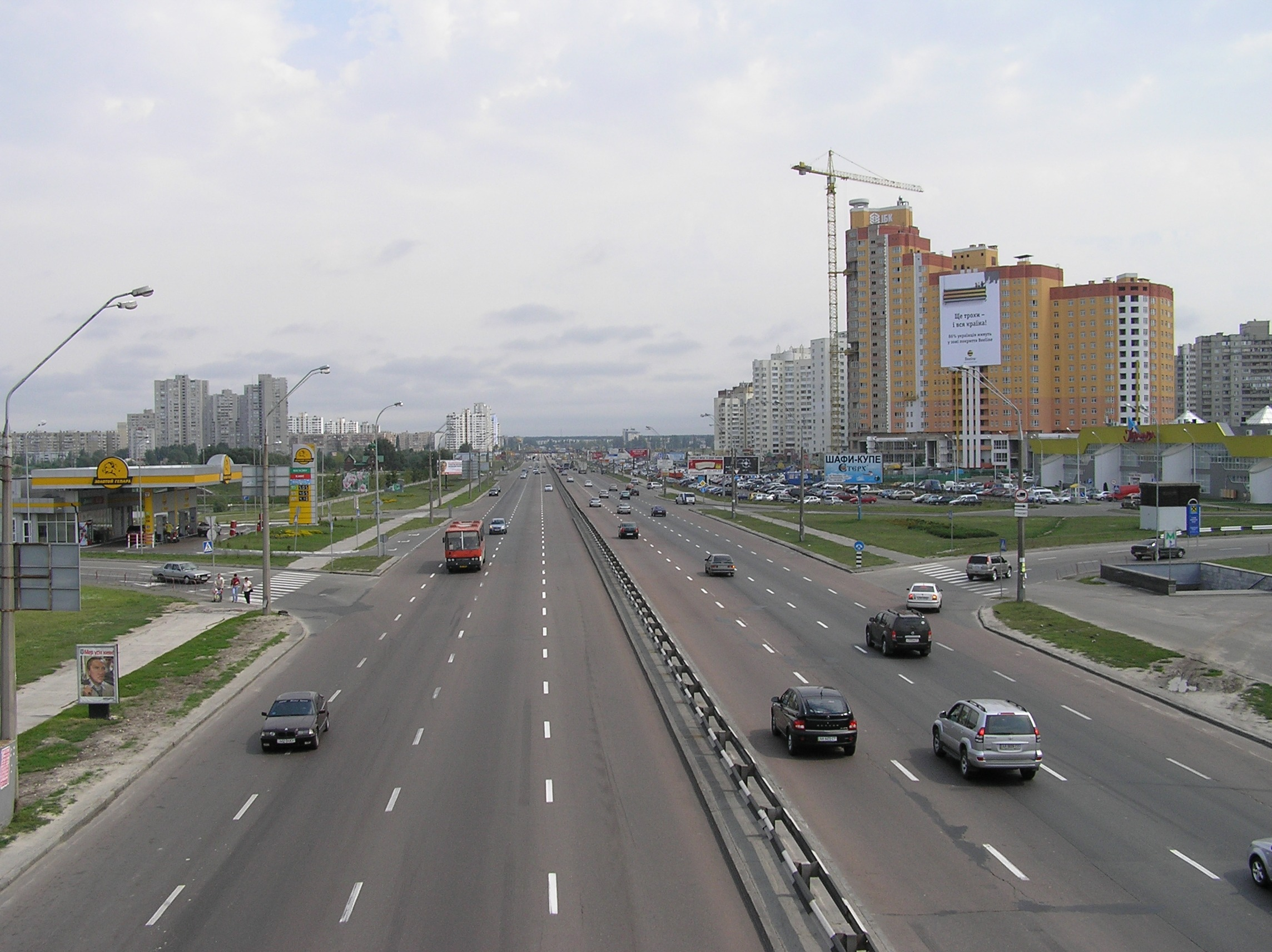
- Prospect Bazhana in Kharkivskyi

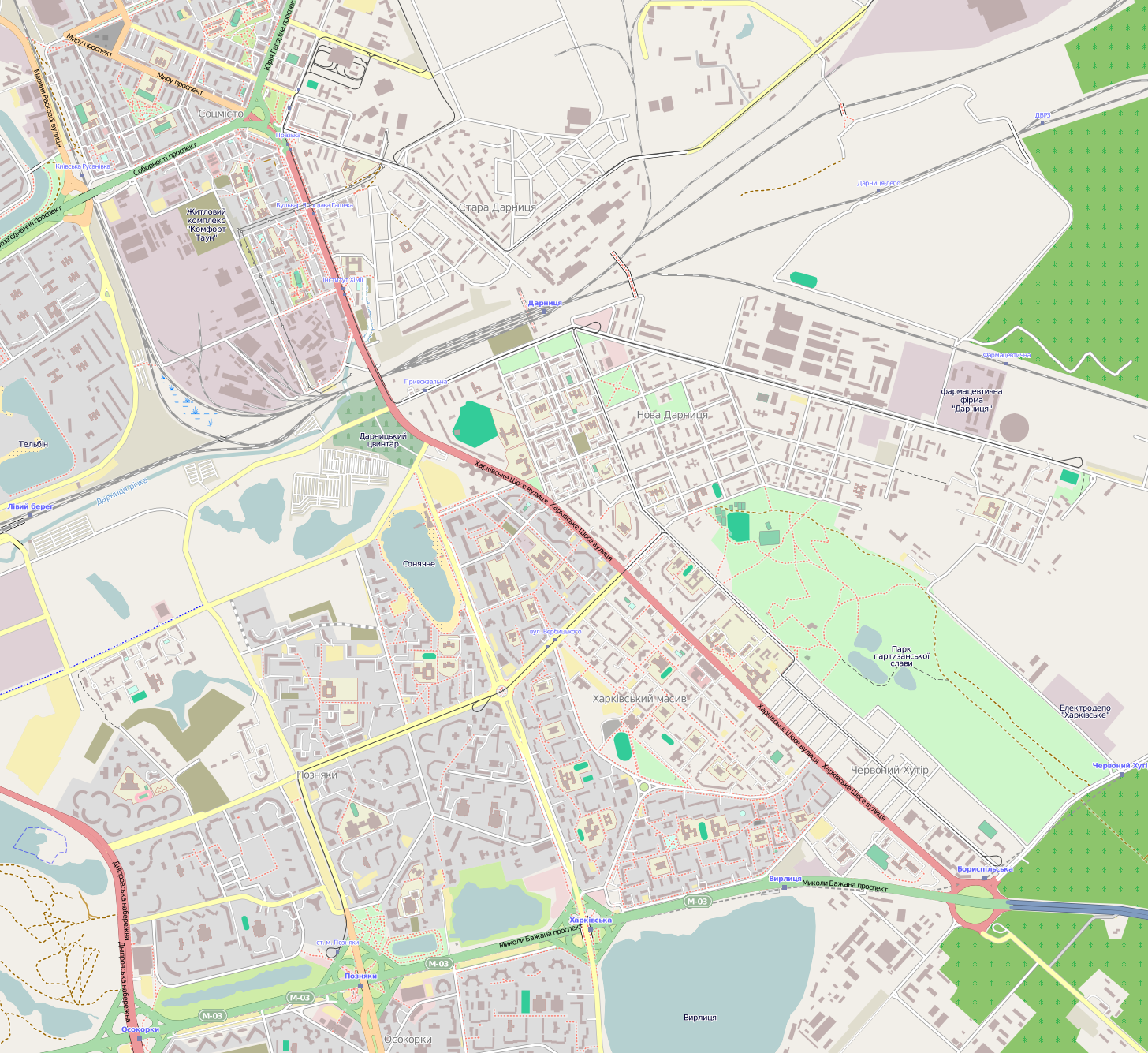
- Country: Ukraine
- City Municipality: Kyiv
- Raion: Darnytskyi District
- Time zone: UTC+2 (EET)
  - Summer (DST): UTC+3 (EEST)
- Metro stations: Kharkivska, Vyrlytsia,

Kharkivskyi masyv (Ukrainian: Харківський масив, literally Kharkivskyi neighborhood or Kharkivskyi residential area), is located in the Darnytsia Raion of Kyiv, Ukraine. The name is derived from the Kharkiv Chaussee (highway) that started from the neighborhood and headed to Kharkiv.

Before the 1980s, when the area was completely restructured, it was known as khutir Shevchenko or village imeni Shevchenka. The khutir appeared not far from the village of Pozniaky in 1924. The khutir was named after Shevchenko, thanks to a collective farm located at Chervonyi Khutir, but officially the name appeared only in 1961. After the World War II, the village grew in size and, in 1951, accounted for 3,822 people. The same year, a hospital was built in the village. However, in 1984, the village began to be actively demolished. At the same time, trees were cut down, and peat was extracted from the bogs to make way for the construction of a new residential area. Some houses from the old village have survived to this day.

In the second half of the 20th century, Kyiv expanded actively onto the Left Bank. New residential areas were developed, with Darnytsia emerging as one of the primary areas. While some of these neighborhoods (micro-districts) were built as early as the 1960s and 1970s, development in other parts did not begin in earnest until the 1980s—which is when these newer residential areas started to appear.

The Kharkivskyi masyv was established as an extension of Darnytsia. To prevent flooding, it was situated at a considerable distance from the banks of the Dnieper, deep within the Left Bank area. It was only later that the Osokorky and Pozniaky residential areas were built, both located closer to the Dnieper; the Kharkivskyi masyv is slightly older than them.

== Architecture and infrastructure ==
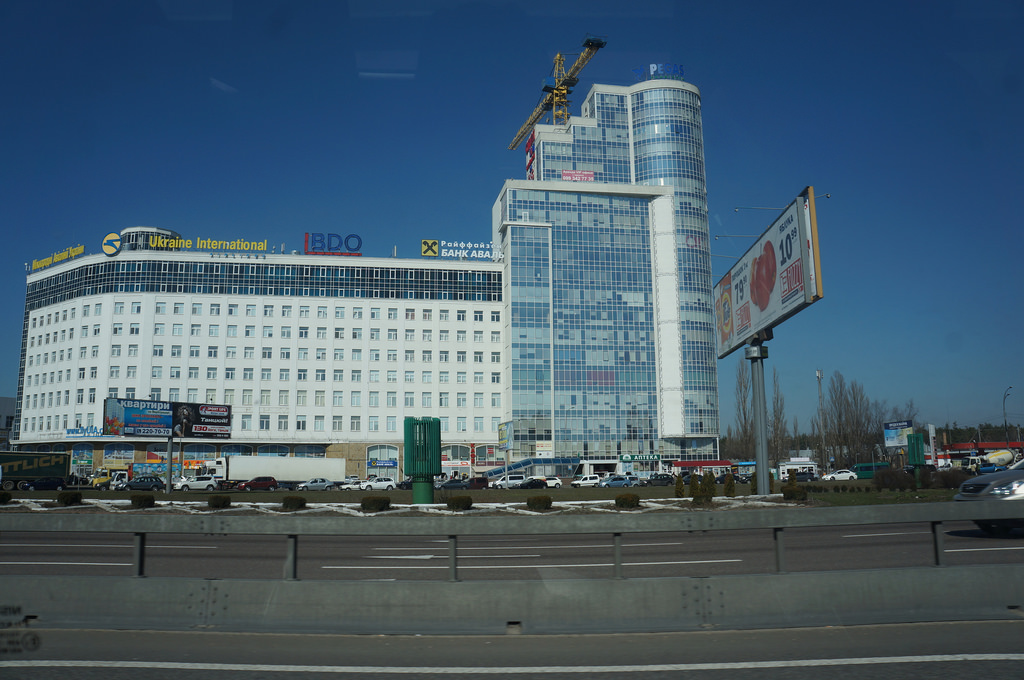
Kharkivska Square

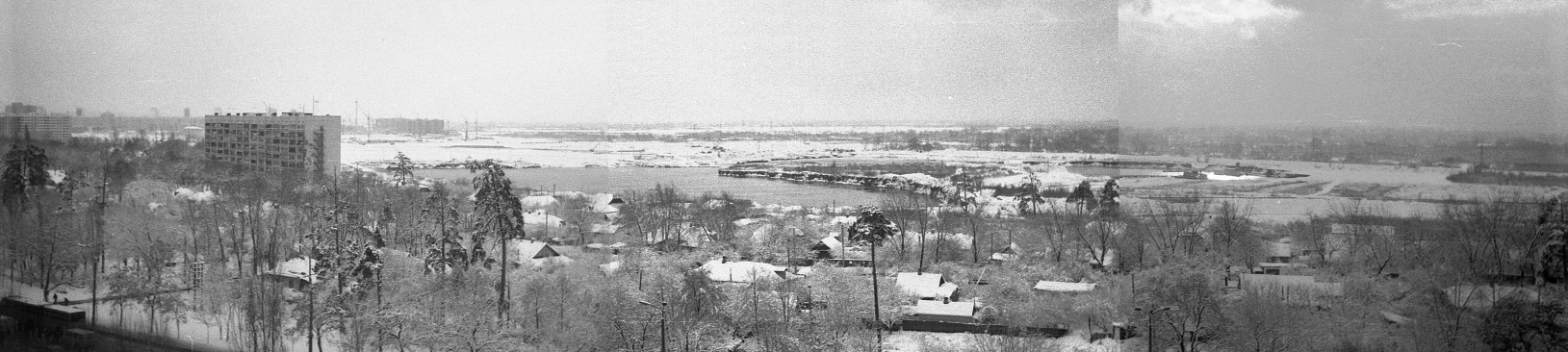
Ongoing development of the residential area in 1987

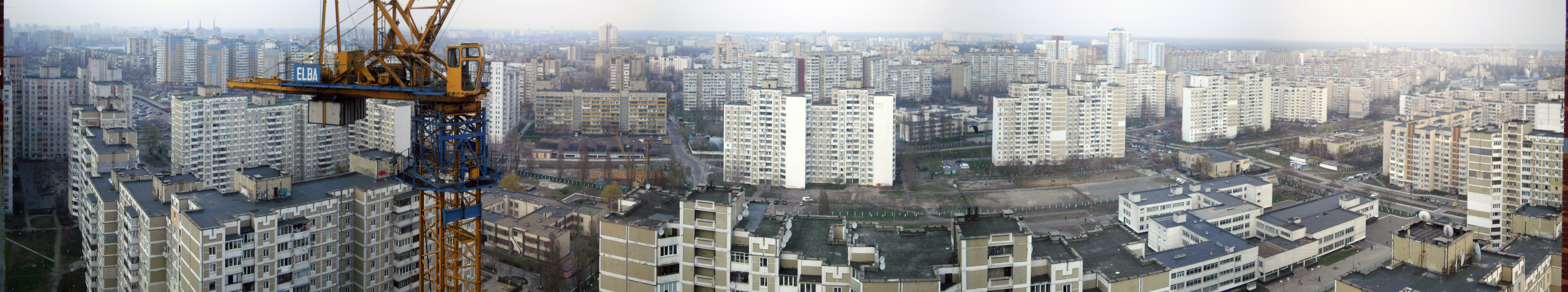
1st micro-district of the Kharkivskyi masyv

Located on the south end of the Dnieper River's left bank, the Kharkivskyi was constructed following similar apartment block plans as the Obolon district. The very same method of sand deposition was used to level and elevate the low-lying meadows. The neighborhood has many lakes, and the beaches are a popular attraction. However, the trees are rare and weak (because of the sandy soil) despite intensive efforts by the residents.

Originally located relatively far from the metro, the neighborhood was not seen as prestigious, but the long waiting list for apartments caused quick settlement. At the time of initial development, the area contained relatively tall buildings, anywhere from nine to sixteen stories.

In the early to mid-1990s, the metro was extended to better cover the neighbourhood. Osokorky (Ukrainian: Осокорки) station was opened in 1992 and Kharkivska (Ukrainian: Харківська) station was opened in December 1994.

Like in other areas of Kyiv, additional development began in Kharkivskyi in 2000. Modern, Western-style apartment buildings were built around the lakes, usually further towards the south and east ends of the neighborhood. The prestige of the area was also increased with the opening of shops, restaurants and cafes on and around the lakes, as well as on the ground floors of apartment buildings. The metro is being extended deeper into the neighborhood, with the new Boryspilska station opened in 2005, and a few more stations were added subsequently.

== Economy ==
Kharkivskyi is a 'dormitory' area specially designed as such. The only businesses found there are retail and entertainment, with no industry present.
