= Chervonyi Khutir =

Historic neighbourhood in Kyiv, Ukraine

Coordinates: 50°24′30.48″N 30°40′36.45″E

Chervonyi Khutir (Ukrainian: Червоний Хутір) is a historic neighbourhood in the Darnytskyi District of Kyiv, the capital of Ukraine. It is located between Kharkivske Highway, Kronshtadtska Street, Borova Street, Yalynkova Street, and forest. Most of the buildings are low-rise private homes, while some are industrial enterprises. Chervony Khutir metro station is situated in this neighborhood.
