= Kharkivska =

Kharkivska or Kharkivski may refer to:

- Kharkivska (Kyiv Metro), a station of the Kyiv Metro
- Kharkivska oblast or Kharkiv Oblast
- Kharkivski Sokoly, a Ukrainian basketball club based in Kharkiv

== People with the surname ==
- Yuliya Kharkivska (born 1976), Ukrainian alpine skier
