= Osokorky (Kyiv Metro) =

Kyiv Metro Station

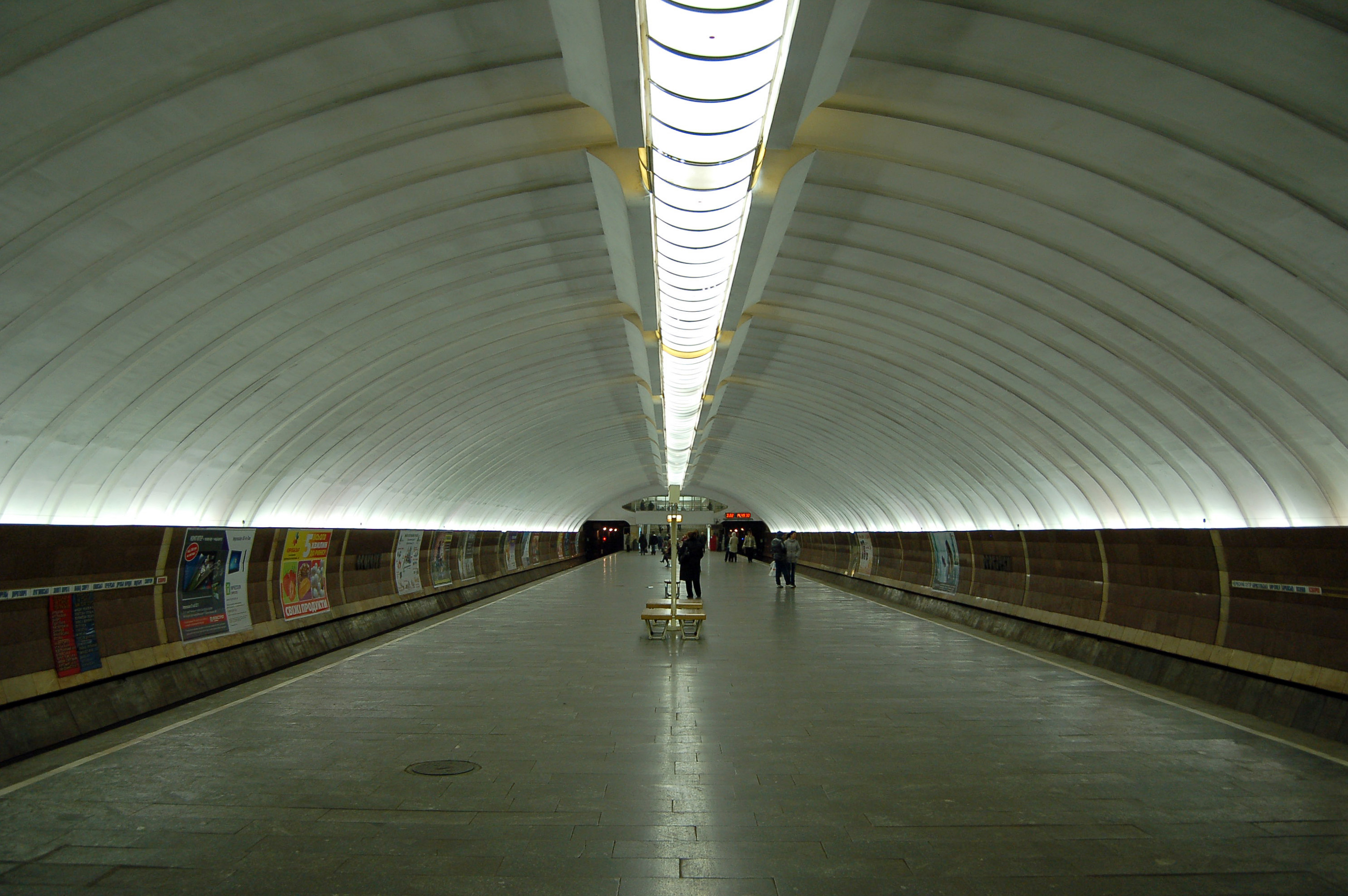

General information
- Location: Darnytskyi District; Kyiv; Ukraine
- Coordinates: 50°23′44″N 30°36′57″E
- System: Kyiv Metro station
- Owner: Kyiv Metro
- Line: Syretsko–Pecherska line
- Platforms: 1
- Tracks: 2

Construction
- Structure type: underground
- Platform levels: 1

Other information
- Station code: 322

History
- Opened: 30 December 1992

Services
Preceding station	Kyiv Metro	Following station
Slavutych towards Syrets	Syretsko–Pecherska line	Pozniaky towards Chervonyi Khutir
Location

Osokorky (Ukrainian: Осокорки,) is a station of Kyiv Metro's Syretsko-Pecherska Line. It is situated between Slavutych and Pozniaky stations. This station was opened on 30 December 1992.

The station was designed by architect Krushynskyi. Osokorky station has 2 entrances. This station is situated in the crossing of Mykoly Bazhana Avenue and Dniprovska Naberezhna in the Osokorky masyv (neighborhood).

Osokorky station operates from 05:35 to 00:06.
