= Vyrlytsia (Kyiv Metro) =

Kyiv Metro Station

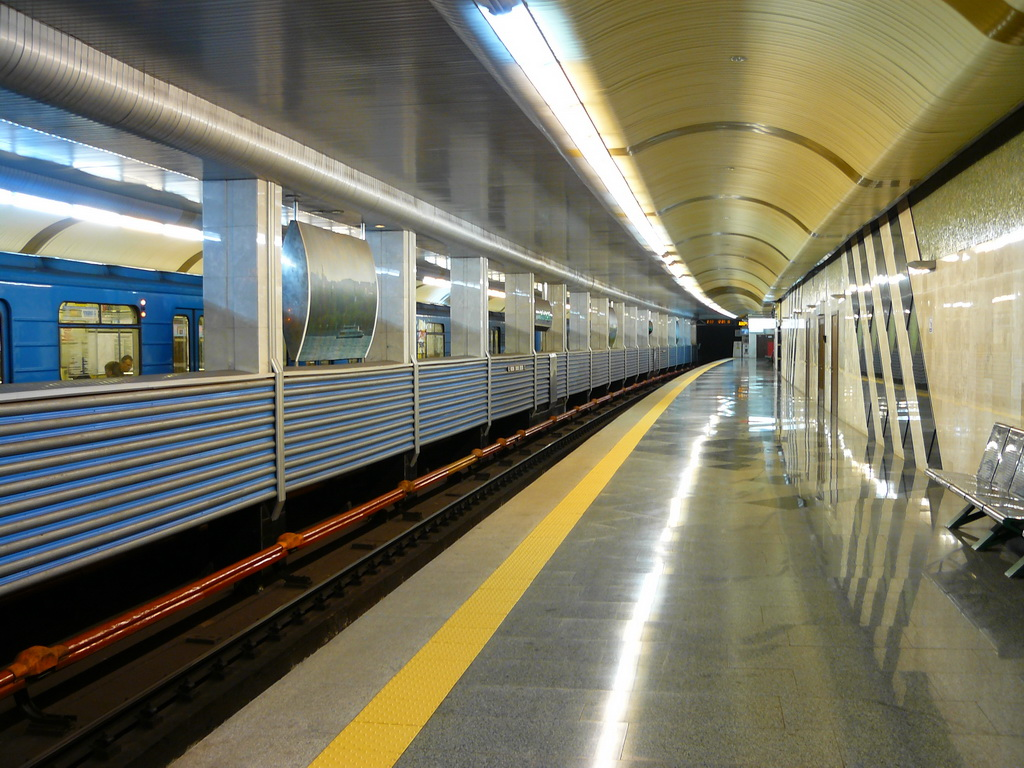

General information
- Location: Darnytskyi District; Kyiv; Ukraine
- Coordinates: 50°24′12″N 30°39′58″E
- System: Kyiv Metro station
- Owner: Kyiv Metro
- Line: Syretsko–Pecherska line
- Platforms: 2
- Tracks: 2

Construction
- Structure type: underground
- Platform levels: 1

Other information
- Station code: 325

History
- Opened: 4 March 2006

Services
Preceding station	Kyiv Metro	Following station
Kharkivska towards Syrets	Syretsko–Pecherska line	Boryspilska towards Chervonyi Khutir
Location

Vyrlytsia (Ukrainian: Вирлиця,) is a station on the Kyiv Metro's Syretsko-Pecherska Line. It was opened on 4 March 2006 on the already functioning stretch, Kharkivska–Boryspilska.

The station is by far the most unusual in the system. Its design is a shallow level curved side-platform pillar bi-span. In the original designs the station was not planned, and the long stretch Kharkivska–Boryspilska was already under construction, when in late 2003, the City urban planning committee decided to invest and develop the empty area roughly halfway between the two stations with new housing massifs. As a result, a need for a Metro station arose. In fact, the only other station in the former USSR to exhibit the same layout is Alexandrovsky Sad on the Moscow Metro whose design was too attributed to the same reasoning.

As the station had to be built into the existing tunnel path, it was deemed too expensive and impractical to alter the path of the tunnels. This resulted in the track construction continuing as planned, while a station pit was built around them. As a result, Vyrlytsia opened half a year after Boryspilska. The curvature of the platform is a merit to this. The other visible sign is the central pillar span that separates the paths. Like in the rest of the stretch this was to house pipes and tubes with communication cables, again for reasons of cost-saving, these were left and instead coated with metallic planes, which were also used for the ceiling of the station.

It believes and disbelieves:
Where reeds have ripened now,
The doors of "Vyrlytsia" opened,
As sung out of the soul.
Here, the will of metro-builders
Is set in the concrete.
For they believed—plans will come true—
And such is the Metro law!!!

Also, unlike other shallow stations in Kyiv, Vyrlytsia's vestibule is not at the far ends of the platform but in its centre with staircases leading to large underground vestibule which has glazed pavilions on the surface, that are located on both sides of the Mykola Bazhan avenue. As with all new stations in Kyiv, disabled access is not overlooked and the station features four lifts to the surface.

Designed by architect V. Gnevyshev, decoratively the station has a "high-tech" theme, and in addition to the metallic planes its walls are riveted with smelt, green mosaic and beige coloured marble. The floor is covered with grey granite and the surface vestibule has lit opaque glass with urban skyline images drawn on it.

In a unique twist of opening dates for Metro stations, that were usually for occasions like New Year or October Revolution in the past, Vyrlytsia is the first known case to open in honour of the International Women's Day, (8 March) which too is a public holiday in Ukraine. The then Mayor of Kyiv, Oleksandr Omelchenko, despite his leave, was present for the opening.

However, the station's proximity to lake Vyrlytsia for which it was named, and the technique of construction proved to be unsuitable to guard it from flooding, which became evident since its opening. However, during the summer of 2006 the rains were strong enough to necessitate the station's closure for repair to the hydroisolation. Since then one of the disabled lifts has been out of service. Of the positive effects, the station took some of the passenger traffic off the previous terminus of the line, Kharkivska.
