= Kharkivskyi Raion =

Kharkivskyi Raion may refer to one of the following:

- A neighborhood in Kiev, Ukraine, formerly an administrative raion (district) of the city, sometimes still referred to as Kharkivskyi Raion, see Kharkivskyi Masyv
- Kharkiv Raion, a raion (administrative subdivision) in Kharkiv Oblast, Ukraine
