= Kharkivska (Kyiv Metro) =

Kyiv Metro Station

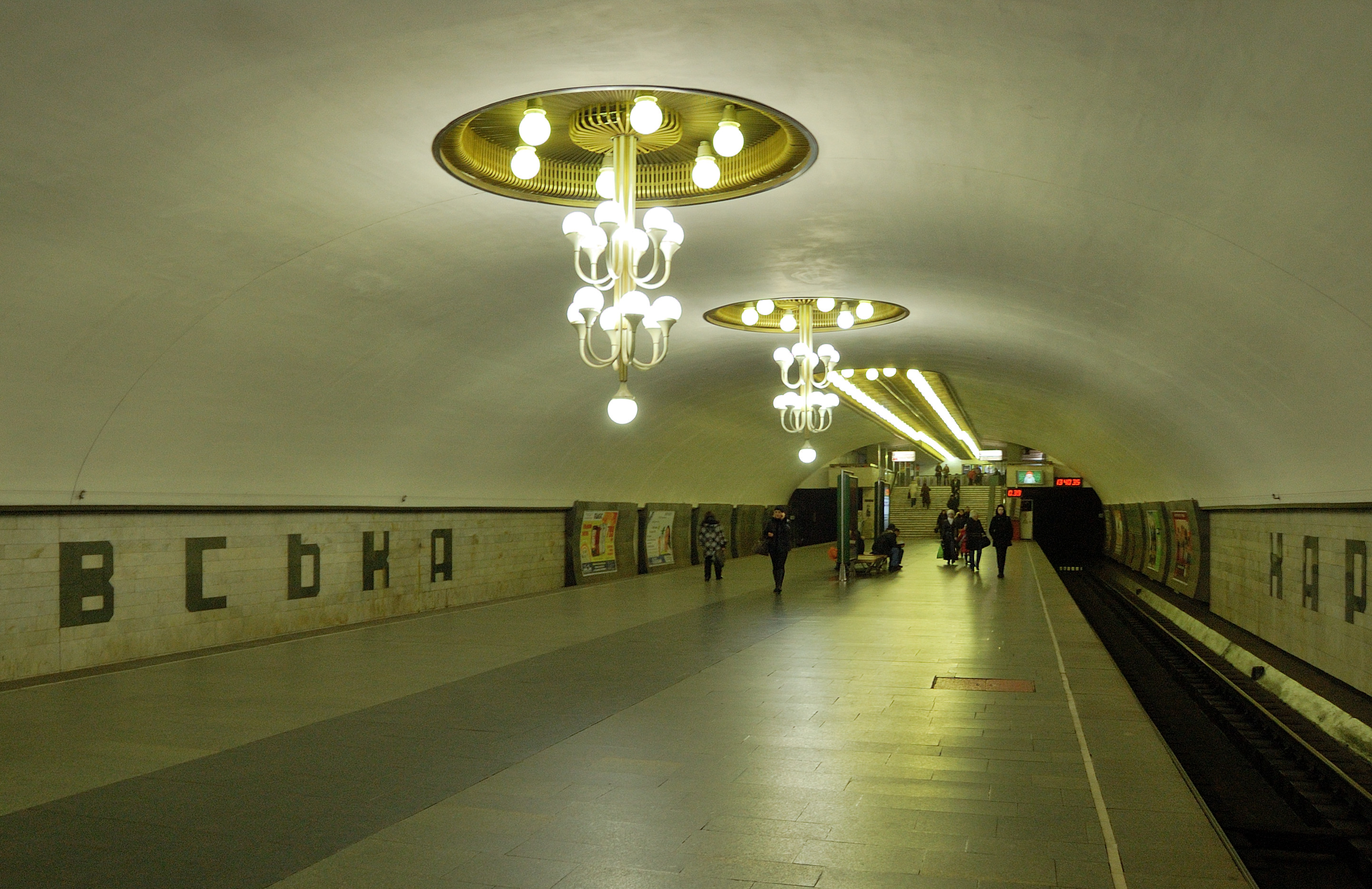

General information
- Location: Darnytskyi District; Kyiv; Ukraine
- Coordinates: 50°24′3″N 30°39′8″E
- System: Kyiv Metro station
- Owner: Kyiv Metro
- Line: Syretsko–Pecherska line
- Platforms: 1
- Tracks: 2

Construction
- Structure type: underground
- Platform levels: 1

Other information
- Station code: 324

History
- Opened: 28 December 1994

Services
Preceding station	Kyiv Metro	Following station
Pozniaky towards Syrets	Syretsko–Pecherska line	Vyrlytsia towards Chervonyi Khutir
Location

Kharkivska (Ukrainian: Харківська,) is a station of Kyiv Metro's Syretsko–Pecherska Line. It is between the Pozniaky and Vyrlytsia stations. This station was opened on 28 December 1994.

The station was designed by architects Hnievyshev, Tselikovska, Panchenko. It has two main entrances. Kharkivska is at the intersection of Mykola Bazhan Avenue and Revutska Street. This station is near the Kharkivskyi Masyv, one of Kyiv's neighborhoods. That is why this station is called Kharkivska.

Kharkivska operates from 05:50 to 00:02.
