= Rusanivka =

Island and neighbourhood in Ukraine

Native name: Русанівка
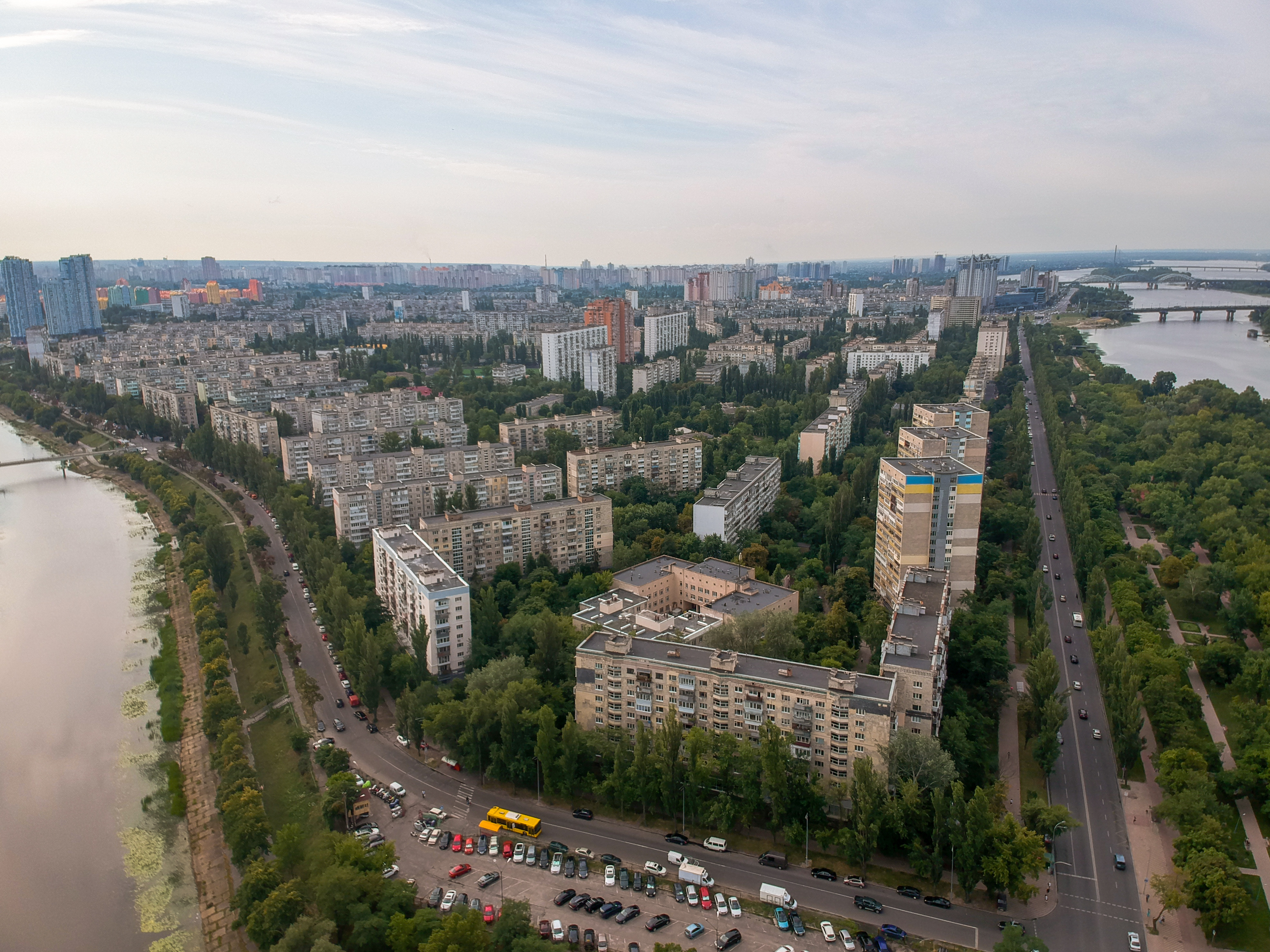
- General view of Rusanivka apartment buildings, ranging from 5 to 25 stories, from the right bank of the Dnieper

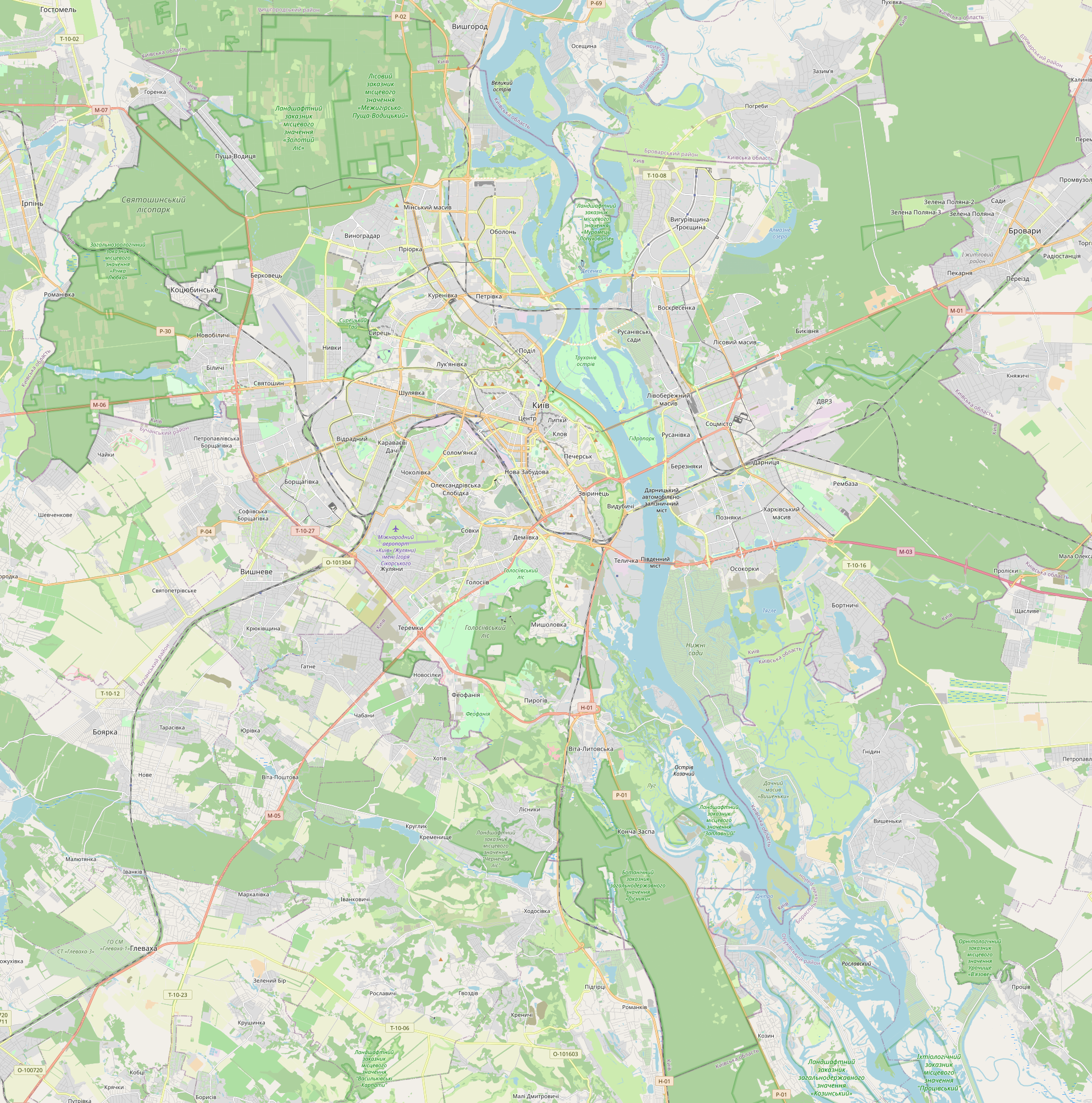
- Location within Ukraine Kyiv Location within Ukraine
- Interactive map of Rusanivka

Geography
- Location: Dnieper River
- Coordinates: 50°26′21″N 30°35′52″E
- Highest point: N/A

Administration
- Ukraine
- Region: Kyiv
- District: Dniprovsky

Rusanivka (Ukrainian: Русанівка) is a man-made island and neighbourhood surrounded by a canal, the Rusanivs'kyi Kanal. The canal is an artificial distributary of the Dnieper River. The river and canal make the neighborhood resemble an island. The island is located in the left-bank part of Kyiv, the capital of Ukraine. It is surrounded by neighborhoods such as Hidropark, Darnytsia, Berezniaky, and Livoberezhnyi Masyv.

== History ==
During the Russian invasion of Ukraine, Russian shelling struck the neighborhoods of Rusanivka during the Battle of Kyiv.

== Overview ==
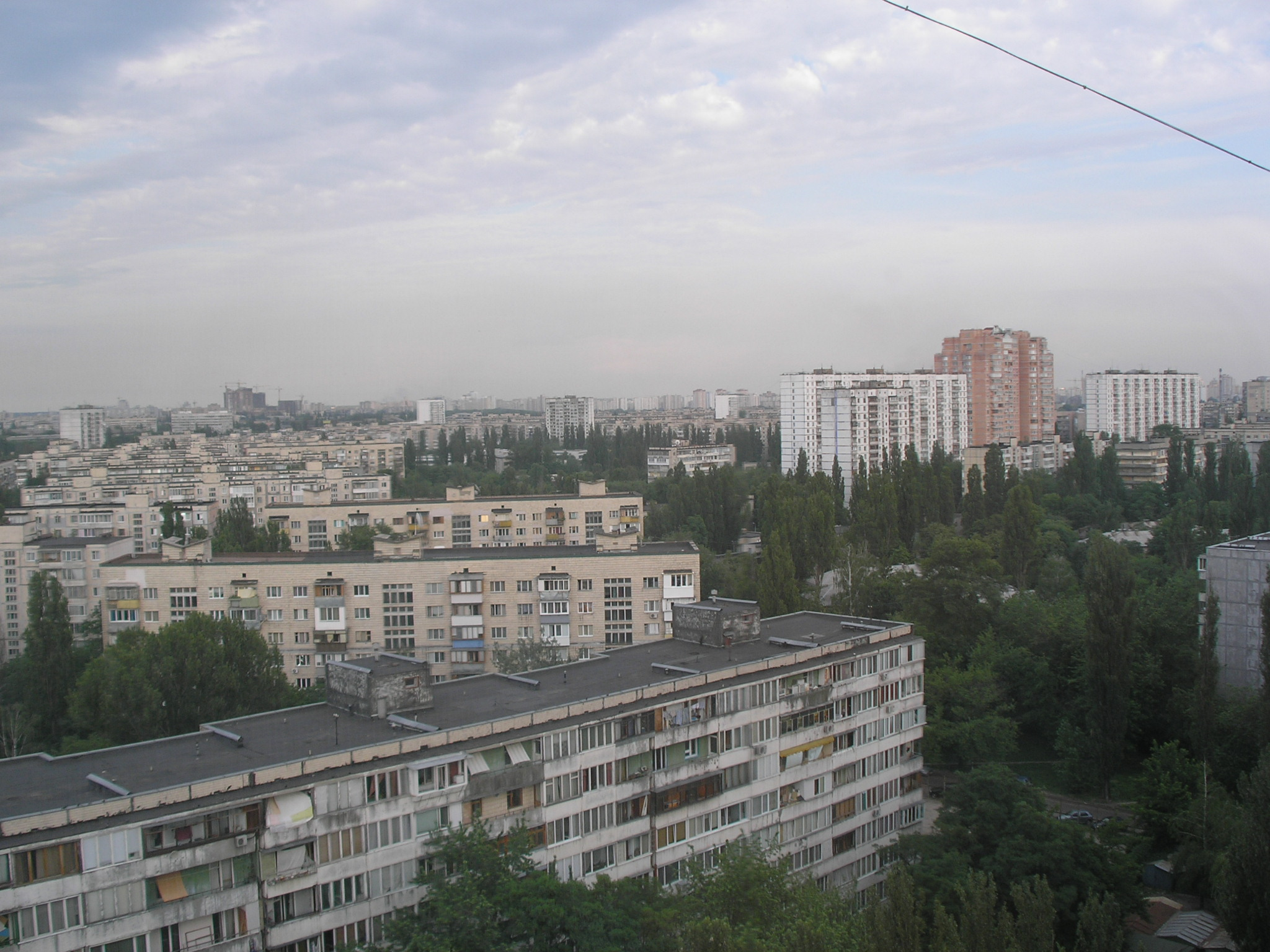
View of typical Rusanivka apartments.

The Entuziastiv Street and Rusanivs'ka Naberezhna (embankment) form the perimeter of Rusanivka. The Ihor Shamo Boulevard cuts Rusanivka in half and branches out into a short Rusanivskyi Boulevard. There are many stores and cafés on the Rusanivs'ka Naberezhna, the main street in Rusanivka. Closer to the river, Rusanivka has a couple small beaches.

The neighbourhood has many apartment buildings, most are which are 9 or 16 stories tall. There are three schools that teach grades 1 through 12. Lacking industry, Rusanivka was conceived from the start as a purely residential neighbourhood according to the Soviet concept of allocating the so-called sleeping districts (dormitory neighbourhoods) in large industrial cities. It was envisaged, during creation of this neighbourhood, that the area would be served by two main types of public transportation – buses and river boats on Dnieper and canal – so private cars would not be necessary for the residents. The river boats would have created a Venice-like atmosphere in the area. In reality, mass transit based on river boats proved uneconomical and was discontinued. Instead, buses and trolleybuses are available on the island. The island is known for its dancing fountains at the canal open from spring till autumn every year.
