= Boryspilska (Kyiv Metro) =

Kyiv Metro Station

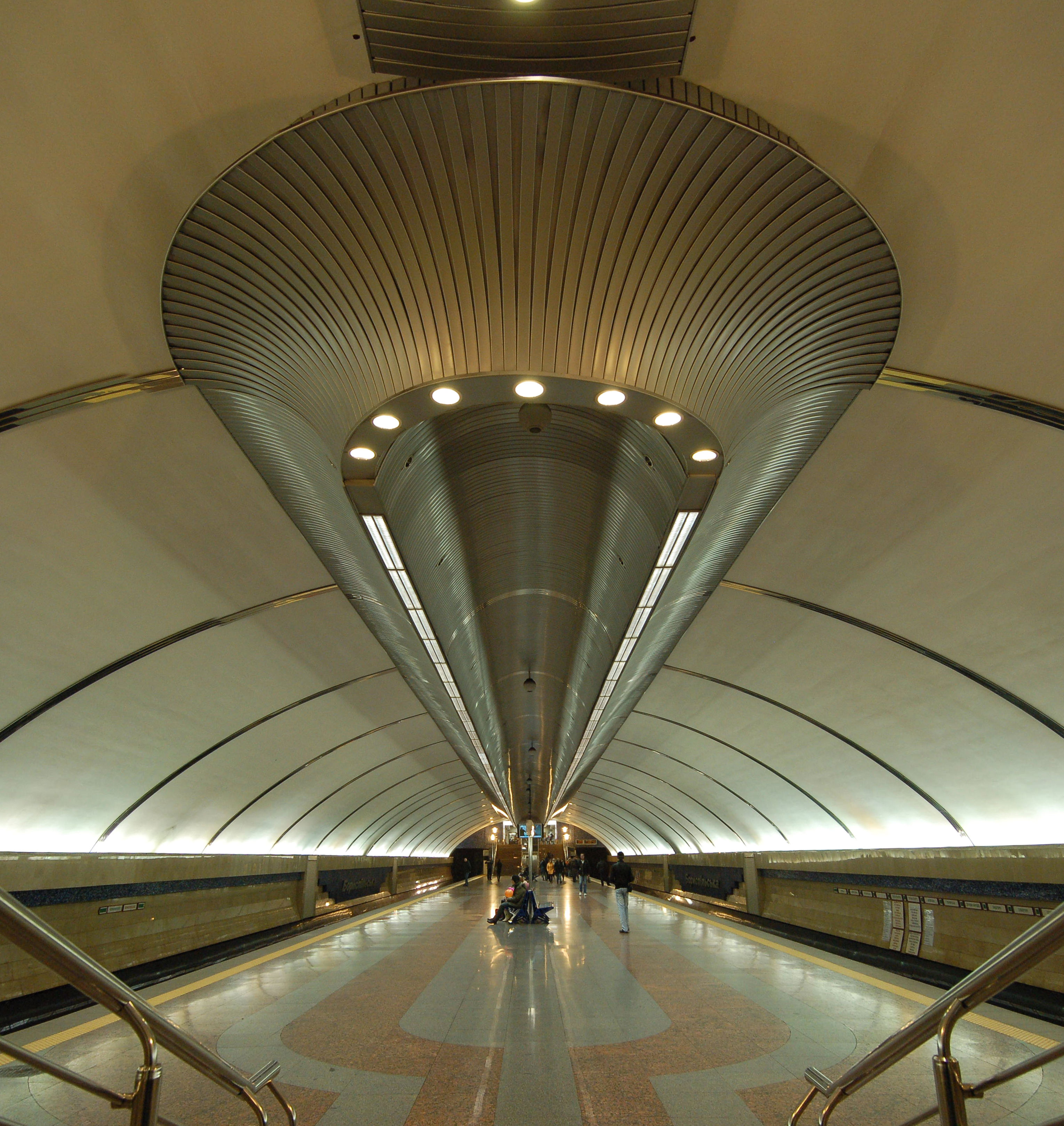

General information
- Location: Darnytskyi District; Kyiv; Ukraine
- Coordinates: 50°24′12″N 30°40′58″E
- System: Kyiv Metro station
- Owner: Kyiv Metro
- Line: Syretsko–Pecherska line
- Platforms: 1
- Tracks: 2

Construction
- Structure type: underground
- Platform levels: 1

Other information
- Station code: 326

History
- Opened: 23 August 2005

Services
Preceding station	Kyiv Metro	Following station
Vyrlytsia towards Syrets	Syretsko–Pecherska line	Chervonyi Khutir Terminus
Location

Boryspilska (Ukrainian: Бориспільська,) is a station on Kyiv Metro's Syretsko-Pecherska Line.

Designed by architects V. Gnevyshev, T. Tselikovska and A. Yukhnovsky, the station is a shallow level single-vault (Kharkiv Technology). Although planned to open in the late 1990s, financial offsets put off the date to 23 August 2005, when it was opened to the public. Decoratively the station's main theme is an aviation inspired "high-tech" design.

The station is last of the six on the Mykoly Bazhana avenue, which after the main roundabout that forms the Kharkivska square, becomes the Boryspiske Motorway (M03/E40), that continues into the town of Boryspil and Boryspil International Airport, and then onto Poltava and Kharkiv. This location contributes the station's name and also to most of its passengers being commuters rather than local residents. The station is located on the edge of urban Kyiv's municipality and the city's former borders.

The vault is a white plastered solid shape with blue metallic stripes coming off into the walls. A long aluminium shape bisects its length. The walls are coated with brown marble and blue mosaic and the floor is a delicate pattern of red and grey granite. Lighting comes from the central aluminium shape and from hidden lamps behind the wall niches. Additional lighting comes from lampposts on the opposite ends of the platform. The vestibule ceiling is located on the same level as the vault apex making the appearance of a streamlined feature. The station has two vestibules on opposite sides of the Khrakivska Square these are interconnected with subways that have large glazed pavilions on the surface. For the first time in Metro's history, disabled access was given thought, and the station features lifts down to the platform level, wheelchair ramps and staircase angular rails.

The station is the first segment of the second stage of the Pechersky radius, and its position as terminus was temporary. After a year of its opening the station's sidings will continue into a new depot built specifically for the Khrakivske line and in the first half of 2007 will continue onto the next segment of the second stage Chervony Khutir, the line will then turn northwestwards towards the new rail terminal being built in Darnytsia before meeting its final terminus on the Sviatoshynsko-Brovarska Line's station Darnytsia
