= Pozniaky =

Neighborhood in Kyiv, Ukraine

Coordinates: 50.4087°N 30.6289°E

Pozniaky (Ukrainian: Позняки) is a historical neighbourhood, a residential area and the remains of a village on the territory of the Darnitskyi district, on the left bank of Kyiv, the capital of Ukraine. Pozniaky metro station is situated in this neighborhood.

Pozniaky is a historical area, of Kyiv. It is located between the Dnipro, the subway, Revutsky Street and Mykola Bazhan Avenue. It is divided into Western Poznyaky (between the Dnipro embankment and Hryhorenko Avenue) and Eastern Poznyaki (between Hryhorenko Avenue and Revutsky Street). The main buildings are from the early 1990s to the present time; Poznyaky are built up with both standard housing and modern expensive houses.

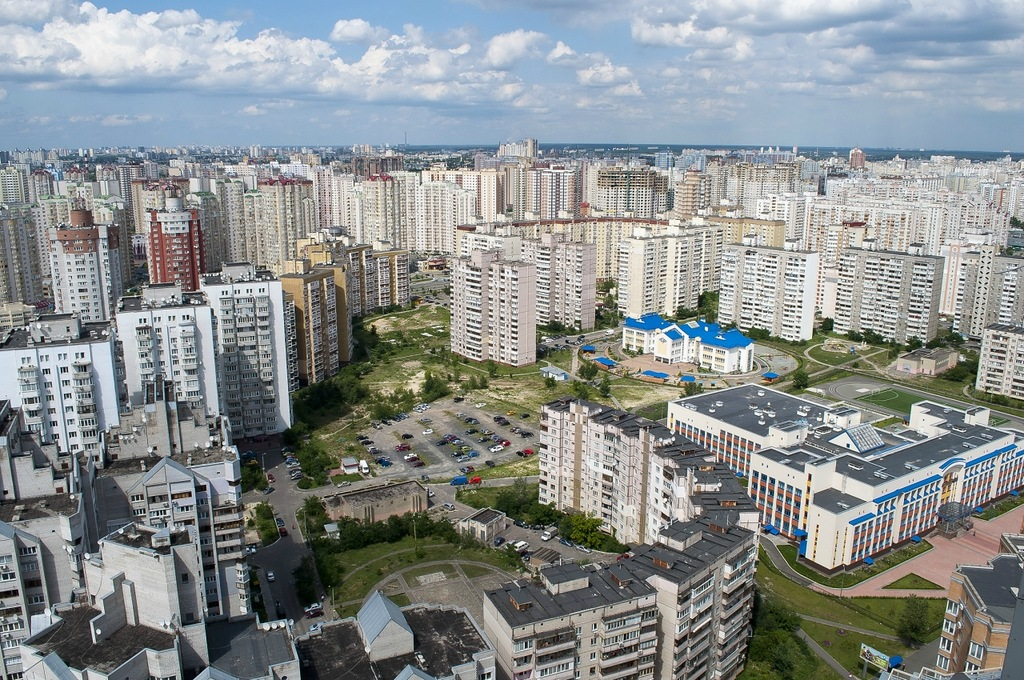
Apartment buildings in Pozniaky microdistrict, Kyiv

== History ==
Poznyaky was settled sometime prior to 1571. It was a settlement of "putnye boyars", a distinct class of junior boyars. The name is probably from the surname Poznyak. It is known that the Poznyak family (including Leonty and Moses) owned the village of Pankivshchina on the left bank of the Dnipro (probably the former possessions of the Pankovychi), which was also called Poznyakovshchina. In 1631, this village was transferred (or sold) to the Metropolitan of Kyiv Petro Mohyla, who, in turn, donated it to the Brotherhood Monastery. However, there are no documents on the identity of Poznyakovshchina and Poznyakov. Since the 1st half of the 20th century, Poznyaky has been divided into Old and New (most of them were located on the territory of the modern industrial zone). In the 1980s, a significant part of the old buildings of Poznyaky was demolished, and since 1989 a residential area of Poznyaky has been built in its place.
