= Wolf Theiss =

Austrian law firm

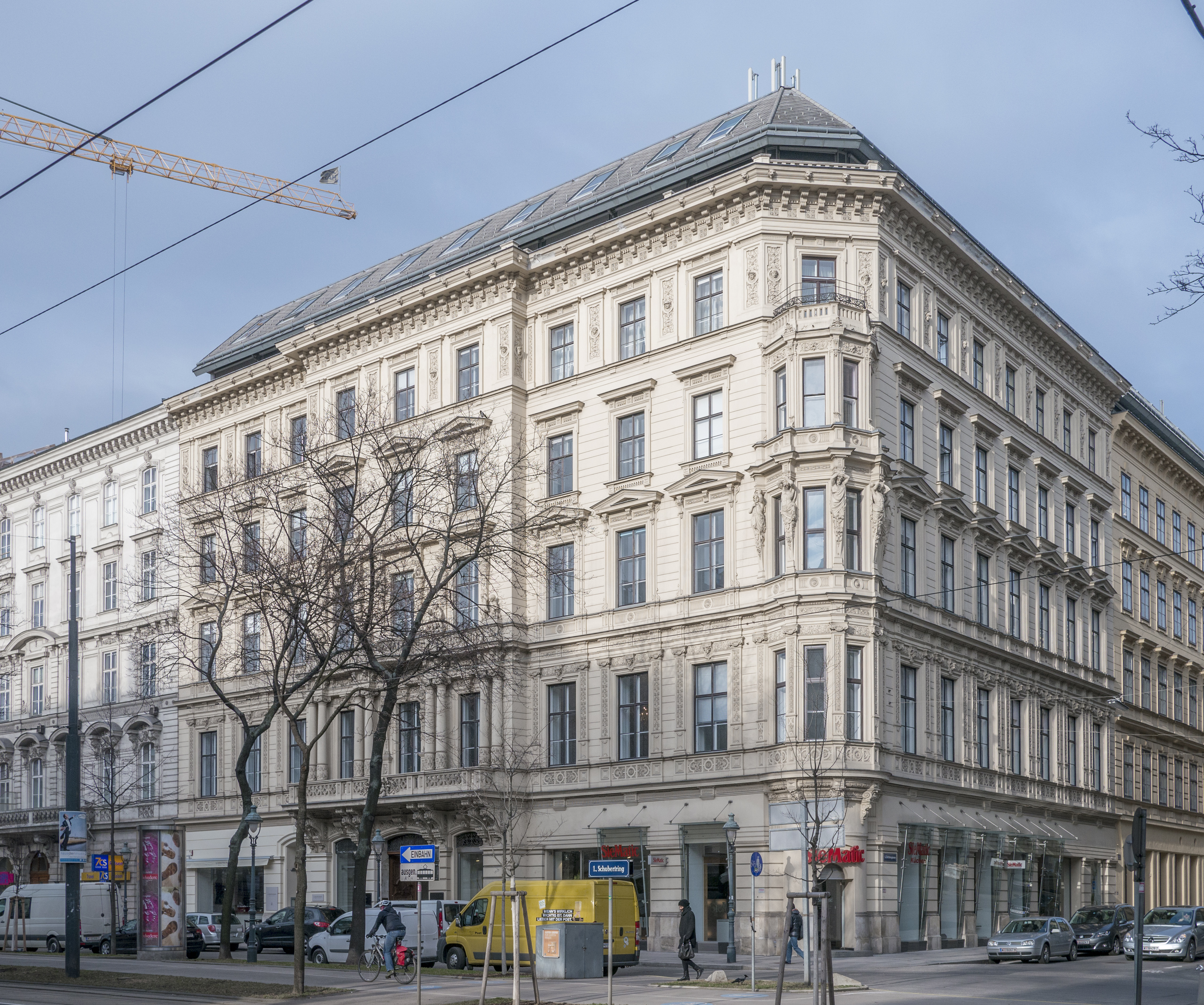
Main seat of Wolf Theiss in Vienna

Wolf Theiss is an Austrian law firm with offices in Central, Eastern, and Southeastern Europe.

== History ==
Wolf Theiss was founded in 1957 in Vienna. Since 1995, the company has opened offices in Prague (1998), Belgrade (2002), Bratislava (2002), Ljubljana (2003), Zagreb (2003), Tirana (2004), Sarajevo (2005), Bucharest (2005), Budapest (2007) and Sofia (2008), Kyiv (2009).
