= Osokorky =

Neighbourhood in Kyiv, Ukraine

Coordinates: 50°23′40.58″N 30°36′55.86″E

Osokorky (Ukrainian: Осокорки) is a historical neighbourhood, on the left bank of Kyiv, the capital of Ukraine. Osokorky metro station is situated in this neighborhood.

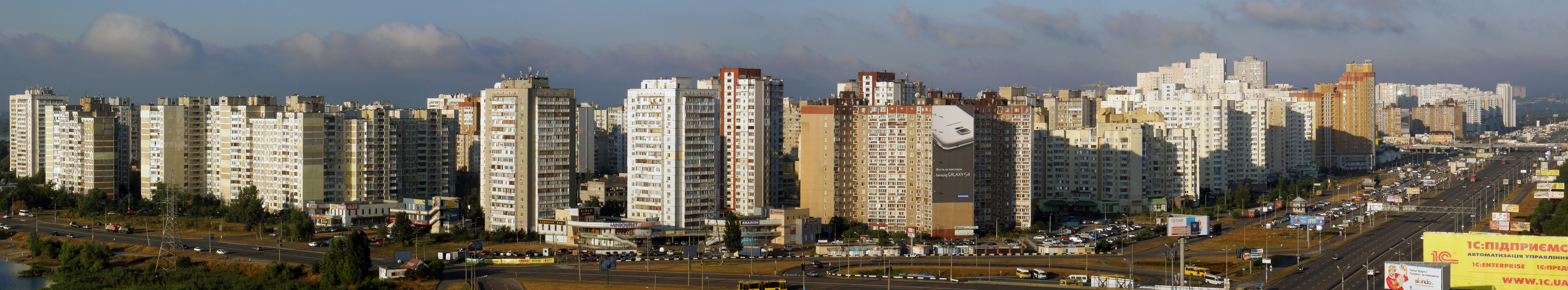
Osokorky neighbourhood as seen from east

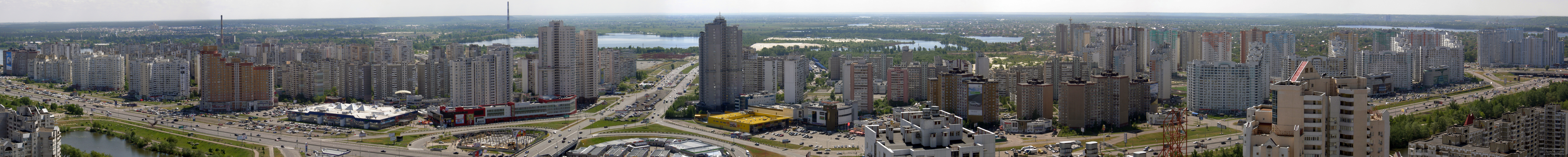
Osokorky neighbourhood as seen from north

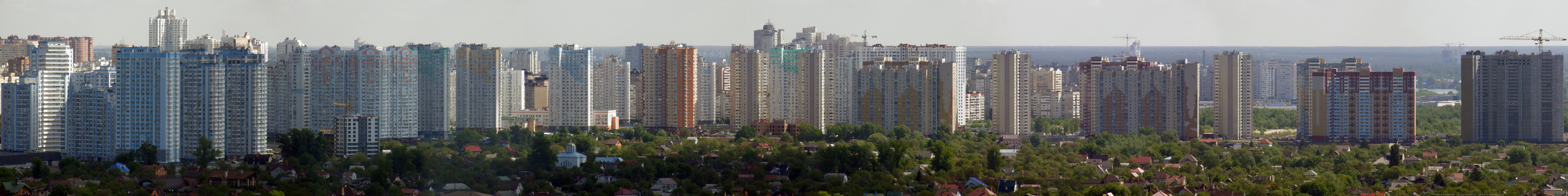
Osokorky neighbourhood as seen from west
