= Subdivisions of Kyiv =

Urban districts of Kyiv

Subdivisions of Kyiv, the capital city of Ukraine, include formal administrative subdivisions known as urban districts (raions) and also more specific, informal subdivisions referred to as historical neighborhoods. The city is divided in half by the river Dnipro, and therefore creates two important portions of the capital city. The so-called "Left-bank of Kyiv", as in reference to the river Dnipro, and which is the newer half of the city, plus the "Right-bank of Kyiv", which includes the original or historic City of Kyiv.

== History of subdivision ==
The first known formal subdivisions of Kyiv date back to the year 1810, when the city was subdivided into four sections: Pechersk, Starokyiv (Old Kyiv), and the first and second sections of Podil. In 1833–1834 according to Tsar Nicholas I's decree, Kyiv was subdivided into six police districts; later being increased to ten. As of 1917, there were eight district councils (called a Duma or Dumas), and which were later reorganized by Pavlo Skoropadskyi into 17 raions. In 1924, the Bolsheviks reorganized them into six larger, party-administrated districts, with various sub-districts under the administration of Hryhoriy Hrynko. Districts of the city that start with the letter "D" are located on the left bank of the river Dnipro, and until 1927 were part of the Chernigov Governorate with Darnytsia being the first to be incorporated into the city limits in that same year.

During the Soviet era, as the city was expanding, the number of districts had also gradually increased. Districts were commonly named for Soviet party leaders, and as political situations changed and some of the leaders were overturned by the other, district names therefore also changed.

The last district reform took place in 2001, when the number of districts was decreased from 14 to 10.

Under Oleksandr Omelchenko (mayor from 1999 to 2006), there were further plans for the merger of some districts and revision of their boundaries, and the total number of districts had been planned to be decreased from 10 to 7. With the election of the new mayor-elect (Leonid Chernovetskyi) in 2006, these plans were conducted.

== Districts of Kyiv ==
The 10 formal raions (districts) of Kyiv.

Administratively, the city is divided into districts (raions), which have their own units of central and locally elected councils with jurisdiction over a limited scope of affairs. Between 2010 and 2022 (Note: In the fall of 2010, then-President Viktor Yanukovych signed a law amending the law on the capital of Ukraine, giving the Kyiv City Council the right to create or not to create district councils, the Kyiv City Council decided to liquidate the district councils. In February 2022 the Kyiv City Council reinstated the Kyiv district councils (and it set the election date for them on 30 October 2022).) the Kyiv district councils were abolished.

The last Kyiv district reorganization took place in 2001, and currently Kyiv districts are:

- Darnytskyi District (Дарницький район; after the Darnytsia neighborhood)
- Desnianskyi District (Деснянський район; after the Desna river)
- Dniprovskyi District (Дніпровський район; after the Dnieper river)
- Holosiivskyi District (Голосіївський район; after the Holosiiv neighborhood)
- Obolonskyi District (Оболонський район; after the Obolon neighborhood)
- Pecherskyi District (Печерський район; after the Pechersk neighborhood)
- Podilskyi District (Подільський район; after the Podil neighborhood)
- Shevchenkivskyi District (Шевченківський район; after Taras Shevchenko)
- Solomianskyi District (Солом’янський район; after the Solomianka neighborhood)
- Sviatoshynskyi District (Святошинський район; after the Sviatoshyn neighborhood)

Most of the districts are named after respective historical neighborhoods of the city.

=== Former districts ===
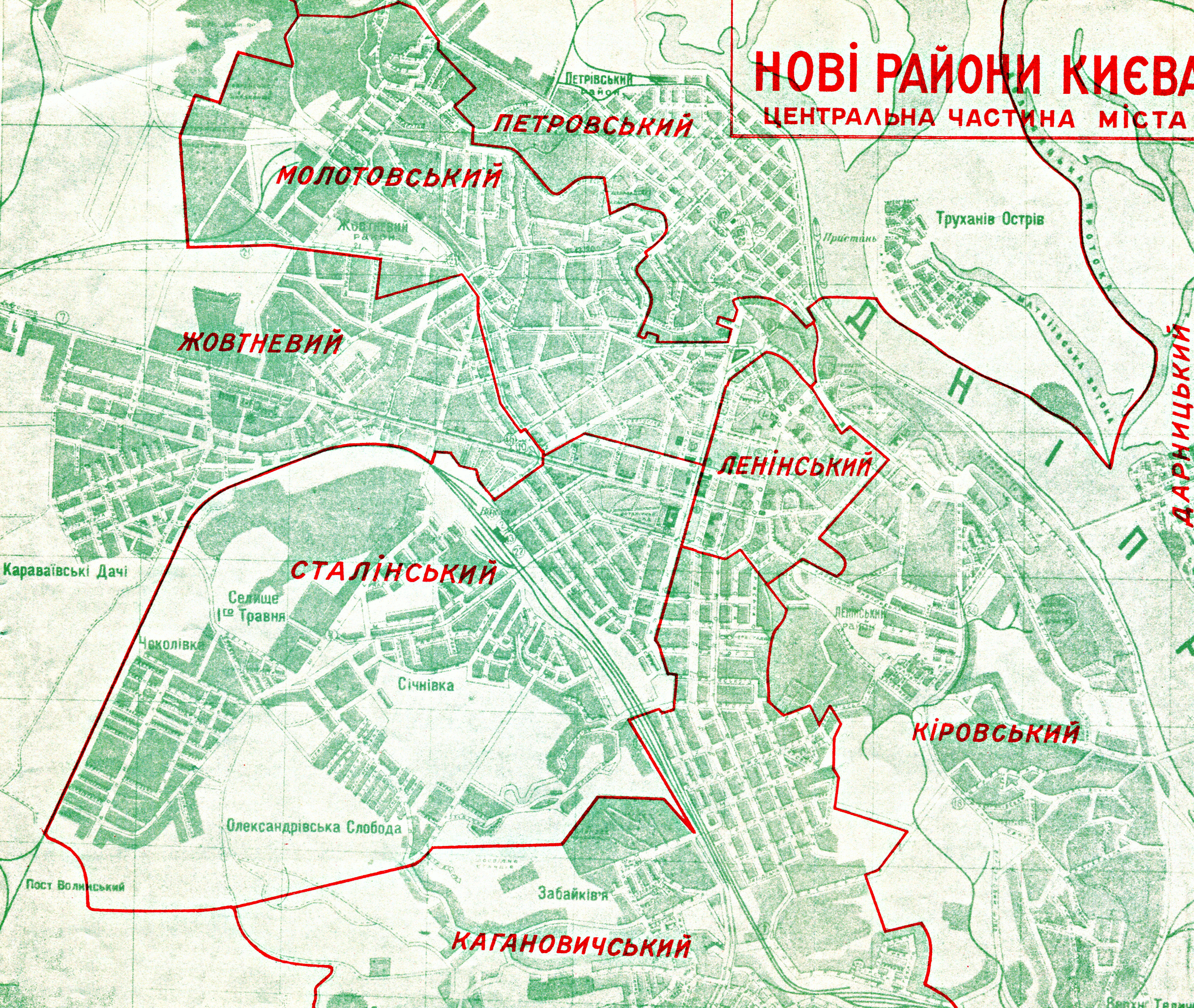
Raions in 1937

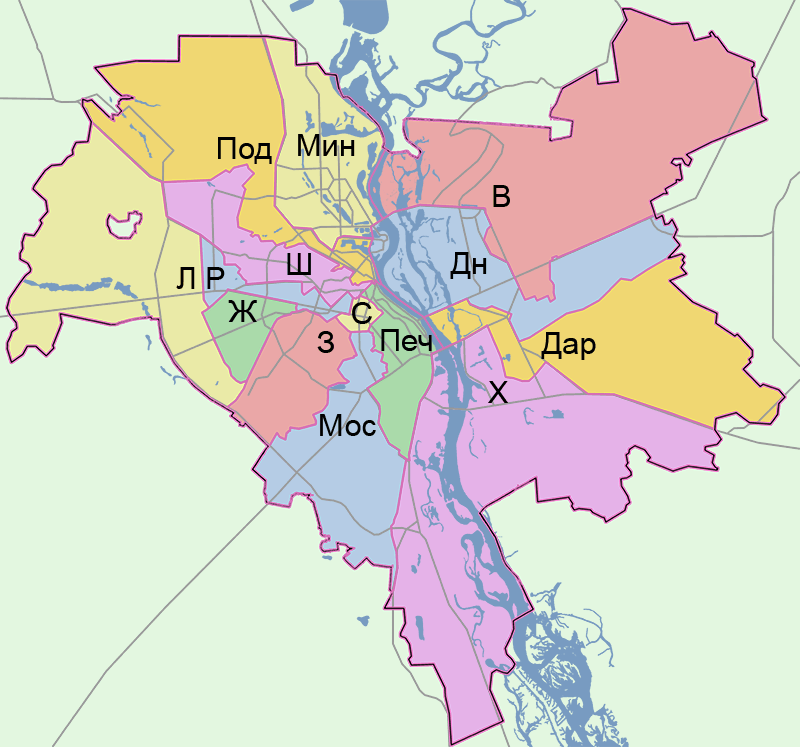
Before 2001

- Zaliznychnyi (9 April 1938 – October 2001), most of it became the Solomianskyi District
- Zhovtnevyi (~1920s – October 2001), raion was created on the territory of Shuliavka that became famous for the Uprising of 1905, in 1938 khutor Vidradny was incorporated within the raion, later became the Solomianskyi District
- Minskyi (? – 3 March 1975), renamed into Obolon Raion
- Starokyivskyi ( – October 2001), merged with Sovietskyi to form Shevchenkivskyi District
- Sovietskyi ( – October 2001), merged with Starokyivskyi to form Shevchenkivskyi District
- Leninhradskyi (12 April 1973 – October 2001), formed out parts of Zhovtnevyi, Sovietskyi, and Shevchenkivskyi, later renamed into Sviatoshyn Raion
- Shevchenkivskyi (prior to 2001)
- Sviatoshynskyi (1918 – 1973), created by an administrative reform of Pavlo Skoropadskyi, was incorporated into Leninhradskyi in 1973
- Moskovskyi (1921 – October 2001), reorganized as Holosiivskyi District
- Kharkivskyi (? – 2004), became part of Darnytskyi District

== Further subdivision (non-statutory) ==
=== The Right Bank and the Left Bank ===
The Dnieper River divides the city into two halves, the Right Bank and the Left Bank (a few large islands belong to the left-bank raions).

The Right Bank (Ukrainian: Правий Берег, Pravyi Bereh), located on the western side of the river, contains the older portions of the city, as well as the majority of Kyiv's business and governmental institutions.

The eastern Left Bank (Ukrainian: Лівий Берег, Livyi Bereh), incorporated into the city only in the twentieth century (since the 1930s), is predominantly residential. Both the Right Bank and the Left Bank have large industrial and green areas. The Left Bank Kyiv began when, in 1937, the town of Darnytsia was transformed into Kyiv City's Darnytsia Raion, encompassing a few newly added villages of the Oster county (povit).

The terms "Right Bank" and, especially, "Left Bank" are reflected in the names of Kyiv's infrastructure, e.g., Livoberezhna metro station.

=== Historical neighborhoods ===
Residents widely recognize a system of non-formal historical neighborhoods. Such neighborhoods number in the dozens, however, forming a kind of hierarchy, since most have lost their distinctive topographic limits.

The names of the oldest neighborhoods go back to the Middle Ages, and sometimes pose a great linguistic interest. The newest whole-built developments bear numeric designations or residential marketing names.

Most notable informal historical neighborhoods of Kyiv include:

Right Bank (west):

- Akademmistechko (Академмістечко)
- Berkovets (Берковець)
- Bilychi (Біличі)
- Borshchahivka (Борщагівка)
- Chokolivka (Чоколівка)
- Demiivka (Деміївка)
- Dorohozhychi (Дорогожичі)
- Feofaniia (Феофанія)
- Galagany (Ґалаґани)
- Holosiiv (Голосіїв)
- Karavaievi Dachi (Караваєві дачі)
- Khresty (Хрести)
- Klov (Клов)
- Koncha-Zaspa (Конча-Заспа)
- Korchuvate (Корчувате)
- Kurenivka (Куренівка)
- Kytaiv (Китаїв)
- Lukianivka (Лук’янівка)
- Lypky (Липки)
- Minskyi Masyv (Мінський масив)
- Mostytskyi Masyv (Мостицький масив)
- Mysholovka (Мишоловка)
- Nova Zabudova (Нова забудова)
- Novobilychi (Новобіличі)
- Nyvky (Нивки)
- Obolon (Оболонь)
- Old Kyiv (Старий Київ)
- Oleksandrivska Slobidka (Олександрівська слобідка)
- Pankivshchyna (Паньківщина)
- Pechersk (Печерськ)
- Pershotravnevyi Masyv (Першотравневий масив)
- Petrivka (Петрівка)
- Podil (Поділ)
- Priorka (Пріорка)
- Pushcha-Vodytsia (Пуща-Водиця)
- Pyrohiv (Пирогів)
- Rybalskyi Ostriv (Рибальський острів)
- Rubezhivka (Рубежівка)
- Saperna Slobidka (Саперна слобідка)
- Shuliavka (Шулявка)
- Shyrma (Ширма)
- Solomianka (Солом’янка)
- Sovky (Совки)
- Sviatoshyn (Святошин)
- Synioozernyi Masyv (Синьоозерний масив)
- Syrets (Сирець)
- Tatarka (Татарка)
- Telychka (Теличка)
- Teremky (Теремки)
- Vidradnyi (Відрадний)
- Vita-Lytovska (Віта-Литовська)
- Vitriani Hory (Вітряні гори)
- Vydubychi (Видубичі)
- Vynohradar (Виноградар)
- Vyshhorodskyi Masyv (Вишгородський масив)
- Yevbaz (Євбаз)
- Zahorivshchyna (Загорівщина)
- Zaliznychnyi Masyv (Залізничний масив)
- Zhuliany (Жуляни)
- Zvirynets (Звіринець)

Left Bank (east):

- Berezniaky (Березняки)
- Bortnychi (Бортничі)
- Bykivnia (Биківня)
- Chervonyi Khutir (Червоний Хутір)
- Darnytsia (Дарниця)
- Kharkivskyi Masyv (Харківський масив)
- Kybalchych (Кибальчич)
- Lisovyi Masyv (Лісовий масив)
- Livoberezhnyi Masyv (Лівобережний масив)
- Mykilska Slobidka (Микільська слобідка)
- Osokorky (Осокорки)
- Pivnichno-Brovarskyi Masyv (Північно-Броварський масив)
- Pozniaky (Позняки)
- Raiduzhnyi Masyv (Райдужний масив)
- Rembaza (Рембаза)
- Rusanivka (Русанівка)
- Rusanivskyi Sady (Русанівські сади)
- Sotsmisto (Соцмісто)
- Troieshchyna (Троєщина)
- Trukhaniv Island (Труханів острів)
- Voskresenska (Воскресенка)
- Voskresenski Sady (Воскресенські сади)
- Vyhurivshchyna (Вигурівщина)

Lypky and Zvirynets of the Pecherskyi Raion are the most expensive areas to live. Koncha-Zaspa is arguably the most interesting neighborhood name dating back to the times of Kyivan Rus. A local legend explaining the name of a locality states the Rus warriors who felt asleep (zaspaly) during their watch at the outpost were killed (koncheni) by Golden Horde invaders. Koncha-Zaspa is now a prestigious area too.

== Practical orientation patterns ==
Another useful pattern of city division is the Kyiv Metro system. However, metro lines do not cover significant parts of Kyiv, making such orientation very approximate (but easy for newcomers). Sometimes, the system of elektrychka train stops are used for the same purpose.

Names of well-known shopping malls, restaurants, night clubs are used for orientation purposes as well.

The full informal set of addresses in Kyiv (used, for example, in real estate advertising) would include:

- Formal district
- Historical neighborhood
- Nearest metro station or train stop
- Formal address

== See also ==
- History of Kyiv
- Administrative divisions of Ukraine
