= Berezniaky =

Neighborhood in Kyiv, Ukraine

Coordinates: 50°25′46″N 30°36′22″E

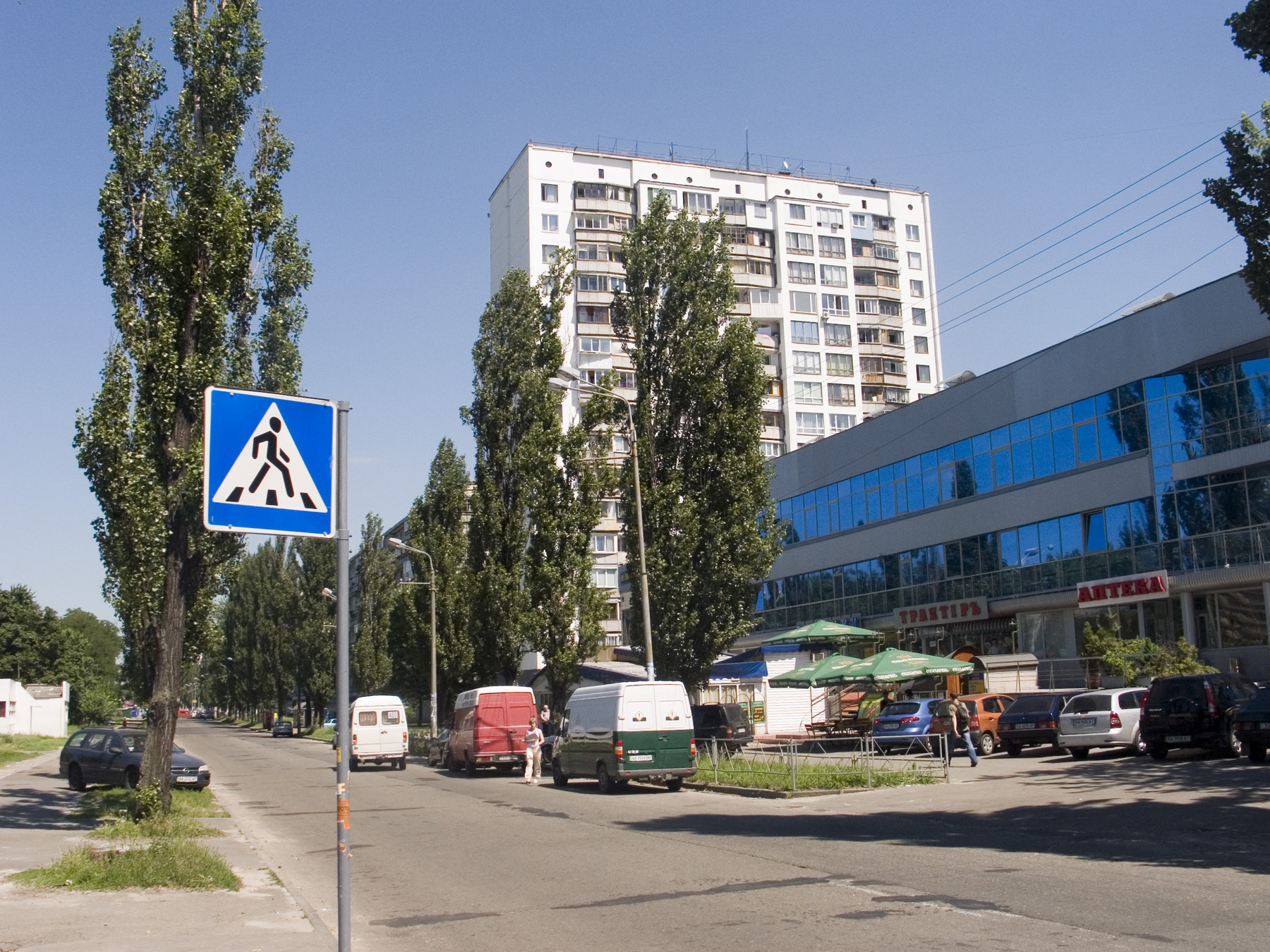
Ivana Mykolaichuka Street in Berezniaky

Berezniaky (Ukrainian: Березняки) is a historical neighbourhood, on the left bank of Kyiv, the capital of Ukraine. Estate construction began there in 1967. Berezniaky railway station is located in the neighborhood.

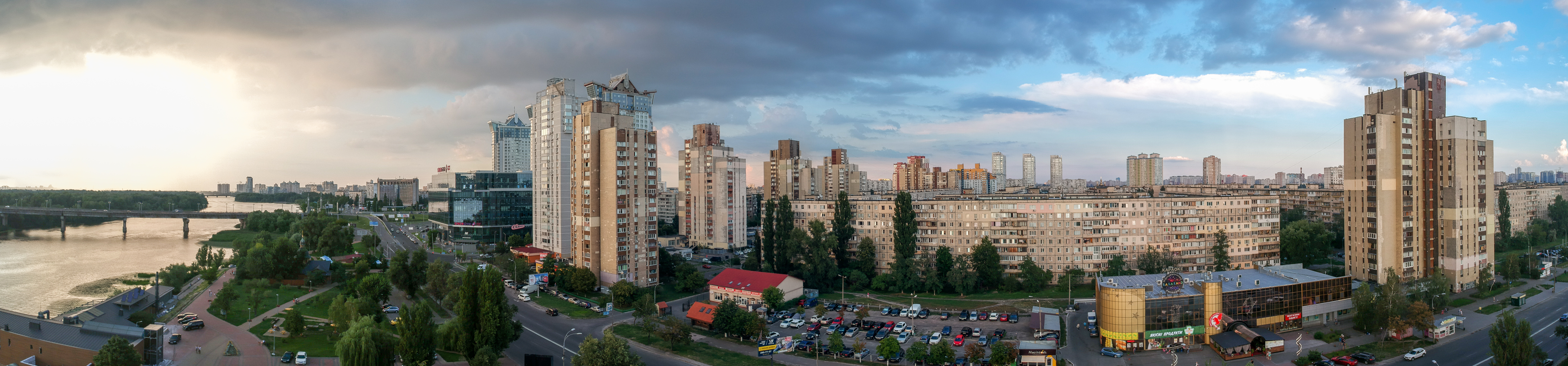
Panorama of Berezniaky
