= Tamara Tselikovska =

Ukrainian architect (1935–2019)

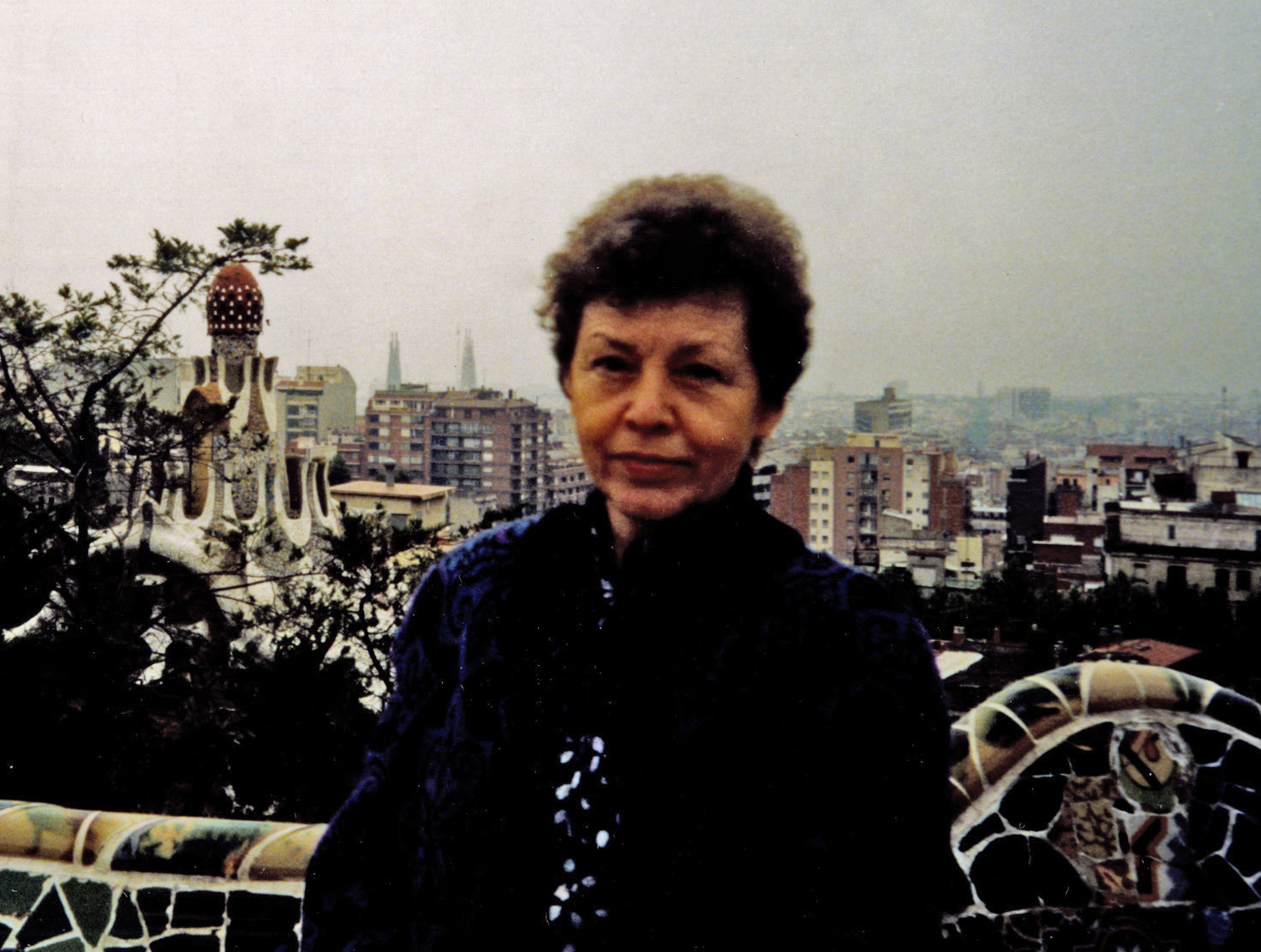
- Born: Tamara Oleksiivna Tselikovska; November 17, 1935; Yelets, Lipetsk region, RSFSR
- Died: July 12, 2019 (aged 83); Kyiv, Ukraine
- Occupation: architect
- Known for: designer of the majority of Kyiv metro stations

Tamara Oleksiivna Tselikovska (17 November 1935 – 12 July 2019) was a Ukrainian architect, member of the Union of Architects of Ukraine since 1969, Honored Architect of Ukraine (1995).

== Biography ==
Tamara Tselikovska was born in 1935 in the city of Yelets, Lipetsk region, Russian Soviet Federative Socialist Republic. From 1953 to 1959, she studied at the Faculty of Architecture of the Kyiv Civil Engineering Institute.

From 1959 to 1963, Tselikovska worked at the Research Institute of Building Structures of the Academy of Civil Engineering and Architecture of the Ukrainian SSR.

Since 1963 Tselikovska has been the architect of the Kyivmetroproekt design institute, the Kyiv branch of the Metrodiprotrans design and survey institute. In 1994, the Kyivmetroproekt Institute was renamed PI Ukrmetrotunelproekt, where she worked until 2014 as the head of the architectural and planning workshop and the chief architect of the project.

Tamara Tselikovska died on 12 July 2019 in Kyiv after a long illness.

== Scientific and social activities ==
In 1960, Tselikovska participated in the development of "Instructions for the use of wall structures made of effective ceramics" (RSN 71-61) as a junior researcher at the Research Institute of Building Structures of the Academy of Civil Engineering and Architecture of the Ukrainian SSR, approved by the State Committee of the Council of Ministers of the USSR for Construction December 11, 1961.

Tselikovska is a co-author of the book "Kyiv Metro" (1976, second edition in 1980, together with Fedir Zaremba and M. Marchenko). She was a member of the National Union of Architects of Ukraine (since 1991) and the Union of Architects of the USSR (since 1969). In 1980-1987, as part of a group of specialists from the Kyivmetroproject Institute, Tselikovska advised Bulgarian architects on the metro design in Sofia.

In 1985–1990, Tselikovska was the secretary of the Kyiv branch of the Union of Architects of the USSR.

== Works ==
The author of architectural projects (as part of creative teams):

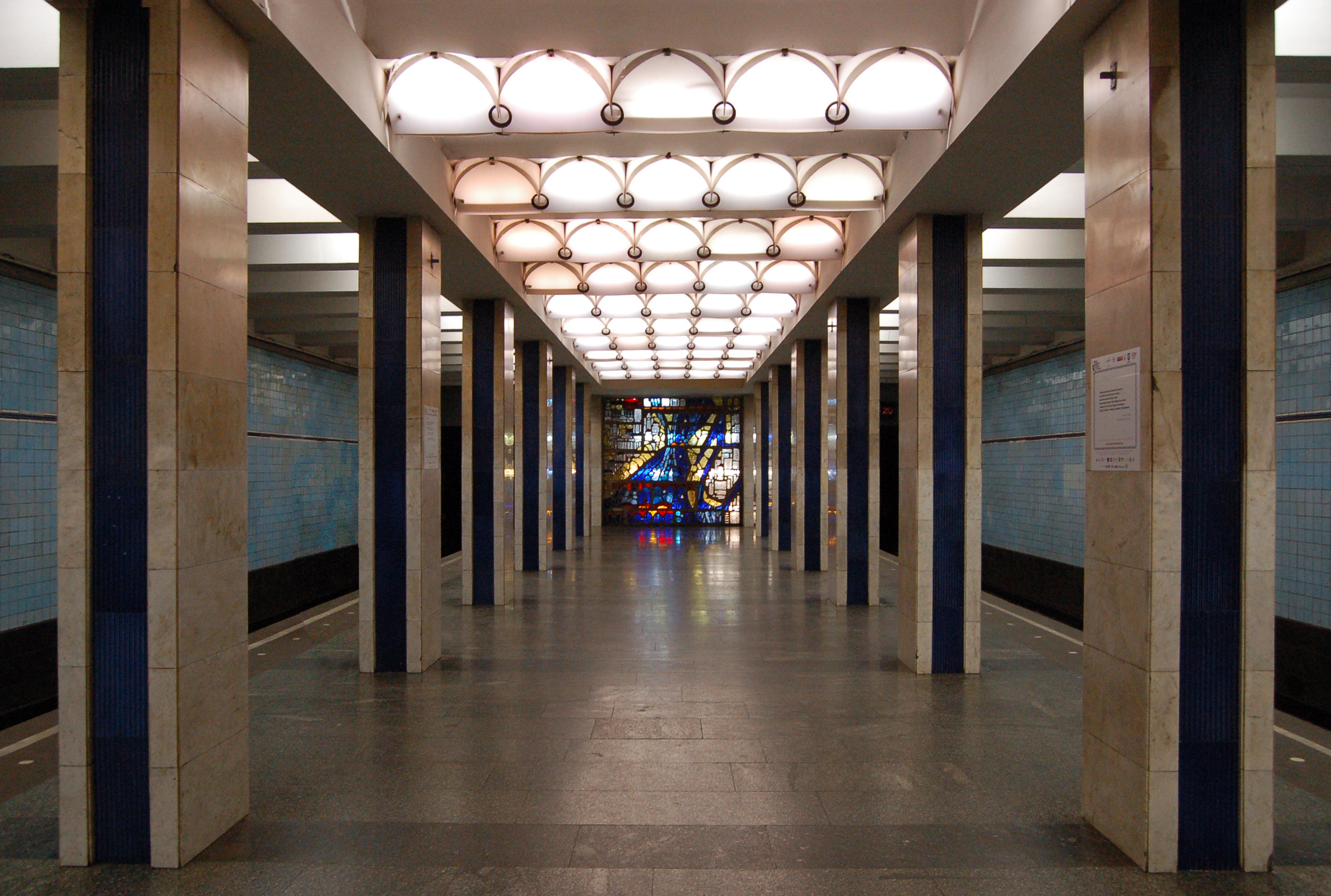
Poshtova Ploscha Metro Station

- Odesa Maritime Station, a complex of facilities for passenger service (1968; together with architects Ihor Maslenkov, Voldemar Bogdanovsky);
- Mine elevators in the Crimea in the sanatoriums "Ukraine", "Sail" (1966-1969), "Lower Oreanda" (1995-2000); projects - in the sanatoriums "Kostropol", "Pine Grove", "Named after Kuibyshev" (1968);
- Escalator lift from the sea station to Primorsky Boulevard near the Potemkin Stairs, Odesa (1971; together with architects Ihor Maslenkov, Voldemar Bogdanovsky);
- Road tunnel in the Crimea on the route Sevastopol - Yalta, Dragon Mountain (Ai-Yuri) (1972);
- Motor transport tunnel in Dnipropetrovsk (1968–1970).

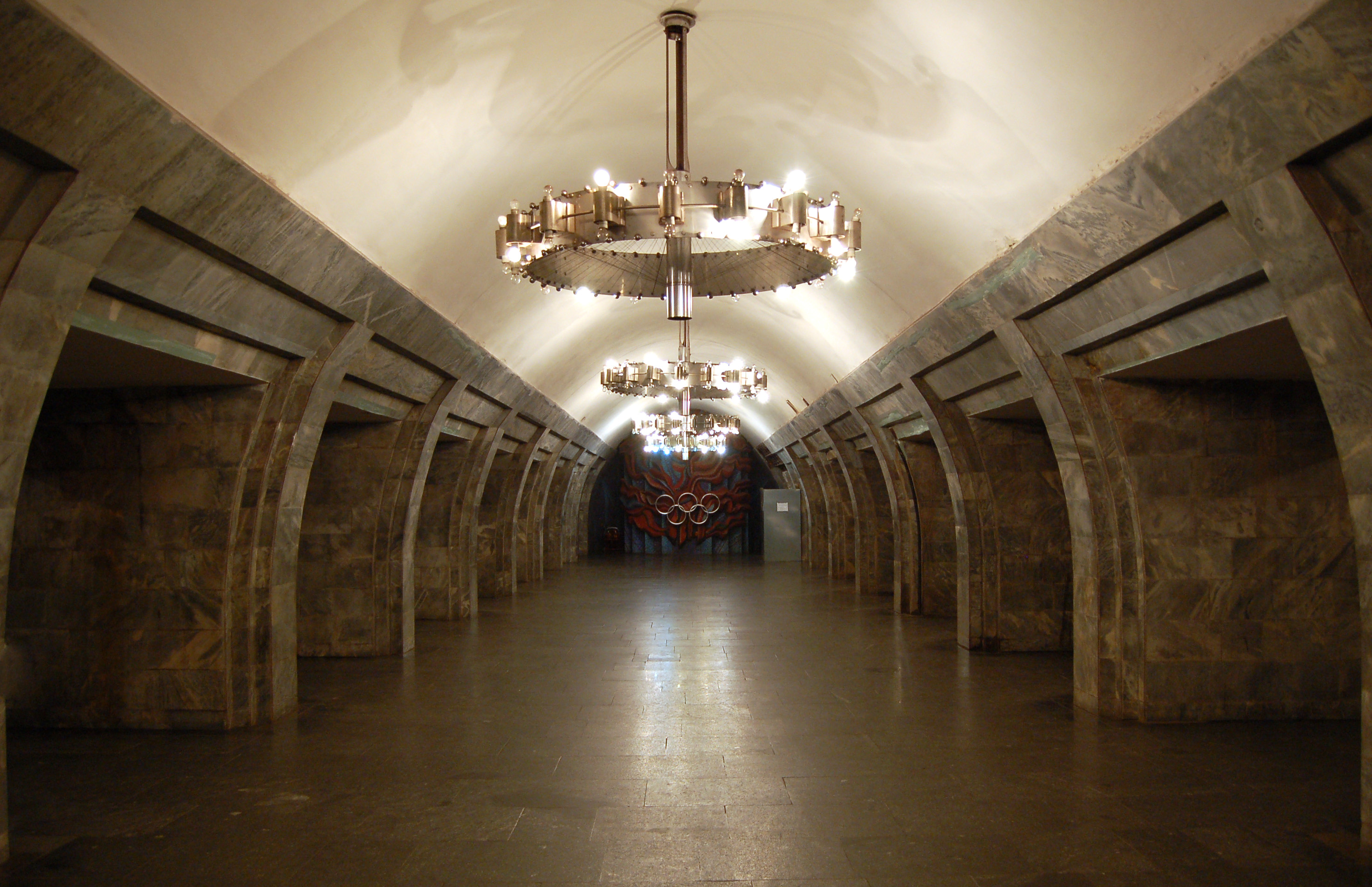
Olympiyska metro station

The author of architectural projects of stations of the Kyiv metro (as a part of the author's collectives).

The author of architectural projects of stations of the Syretsko-Pechersk line of the Kyiv underground (as a part of author's collectives) (1990 - 2010; together with architects Mykola Aloshkin, Valerii Gnevyshev).

The author of architectural projects of the Podilsko-Vyhurivska stations of the Kyiv metro (as part of the author's teams) (2000 - 2010, together with architects Valerii Gnevyshev, Evhen Plashchenko, Oleksii Nashivochnikov, Andrii Yukhnovsky, Oleksandr Panchenko, Fedir Zaremba).
