= Chervonyi Khutir (Kyiv Metro) =

Kyiv Metro Station

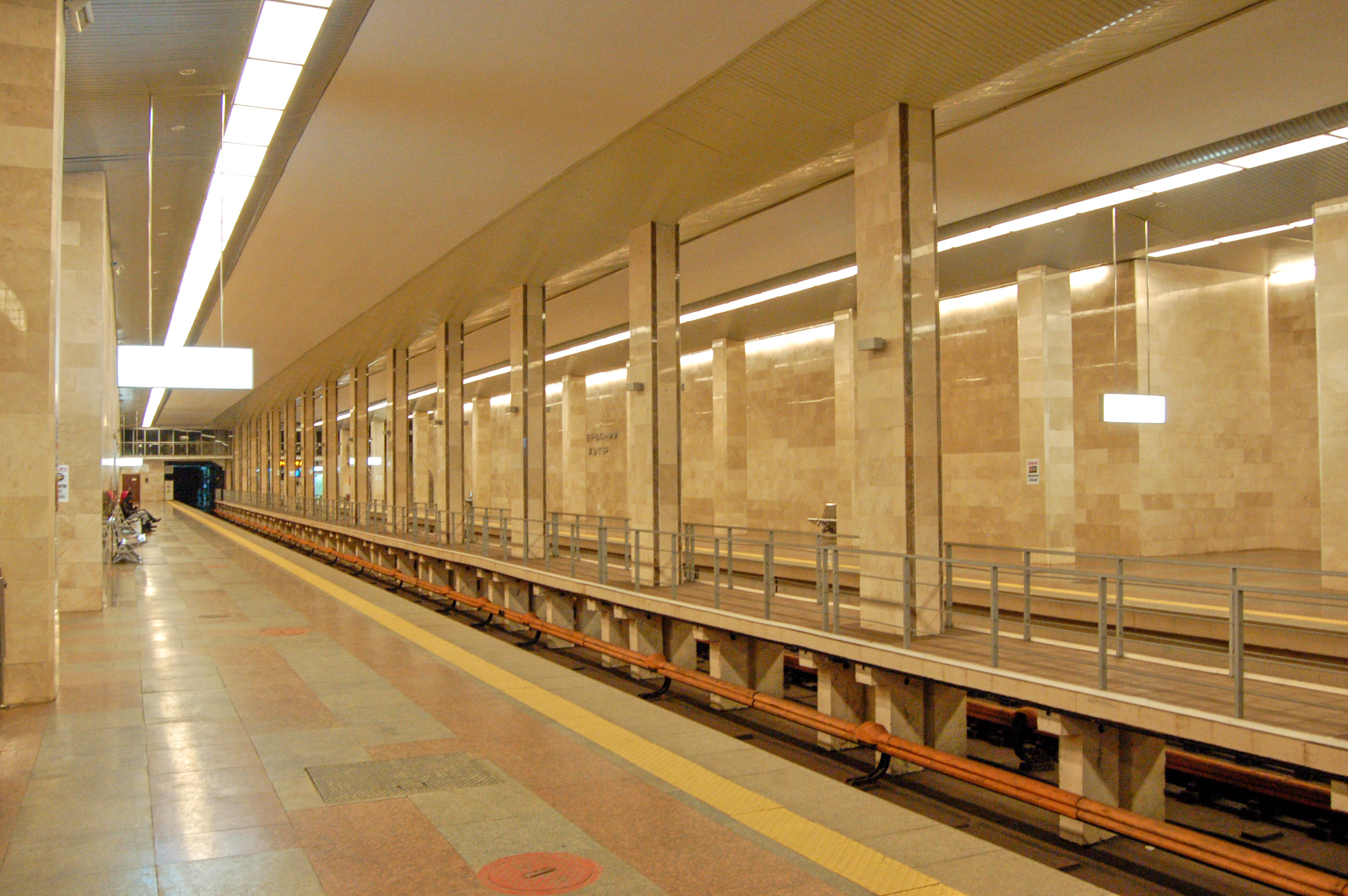

General information
- Location: Darnytskyi District; Kyiv; Ukraine
- Coordinates: 50°24′32″N 30°41′40″E
- System: Kyiv Metro station
- Owner: Kyiv Metro
- Line: Syretsko–Pecherska line
- Platforms: 2
- Tracks: 2

Construction
- Structure type: underground
- Platform levels: 1

Other information
- Station code: 327

History
- Opened: May 23, 2008

Services
| Preceding station | Kyiv Metro | Following station |
|---|---|---|
| Boryspilska towards Syrets | Syretsko–Pecherska line | Terminus |
Location

Chervonyi Khutir (Ukrainian: Червоний хутір,) is the terminus station of the Kyiv Metro's Syretsko-Pecherska Line. It opened on May 23, 2008. The station's name originates from an old village of Chervonyi Khutir, which was later absorbed into Kyiv city limits and is now an industrial neighbourhood. The station is located amidst a woodland and at first was unlikely to have any passengers at all. However, due to the proximity of Kyiv's third metro depot, Kharkivske, there is a greater need for the station. This depot had been a much-needed addition since the mid-1990s, but financial difficulties delayed construction until 2004.

Chervonyi Khutir is also part of much larger plan to have the line snake around the south-eastern districts of Kyiv and then come back up north-westwards towards the new Darnytsia Railway Station and the Darnytsia metro station of the Sviatoshynsko-Brovarska Line. In the meantime, the surrounding area will be redeveloped and new housing massivs would justify the station.

== Construction ==
Chervonyi Khutir's layout is a pillar bi-span with side platforms, chosen out of simplicity and ease of construction. Its main theme would be a light tone and focused on the surrounding nature. The walls and central row of pillars are faced with bright beige and yellow marble and the ceiling with fiberglass.

The station uses a number of solutions for people with disabilities. The safety line at the edge of the platform is made of yellow ceramic tactile tiles, which allows people with visual impairments to navigate better. The station has nine elevators from the level of the platform to the level of the cash hall and from the underpass to the surface.

== History ==
Construction began in 2005 after the opening of Boryspilska station. In April 2007, Kyiv Mayor Leonid Chernovetskyi stated that construction of the station should be suspended due to possible low passenger traffic, as the station is located on the outskirts of the city and "animals do not ride the subway." But later, when an early mayoral election was scheduled for May 25, 2008, it was decided to open it two days before the election. The station was opened on May 23, 2008.

== Location ==
In fact, this is the only station of the Kyiv metro, located not in a residential area, but in the woods. Kharkivske Electric Depot and the end stations of several buses are located nearby. This provides a small but stable passenger flow. There was a plan to extend the Syretsko-Pecherska line to Darnytsia railway station, but the General Plan of Kyiv City until 2025 does not include this extension.

== Work schedule ==
Opening – 5:52, closing – 23:57

Departure of the first train in the direction of:

Syrets – 5:57

Departure of the last train in the direction of:

Syrets – 0:00

Train schedule in the evening (after 22:00) in the direction of:

Syrets – 22:06, 22:18, 22:29, 22:41, 22:53, 23:05, 23:16, 23:27, 23:38, 23:49

== Gallery ==
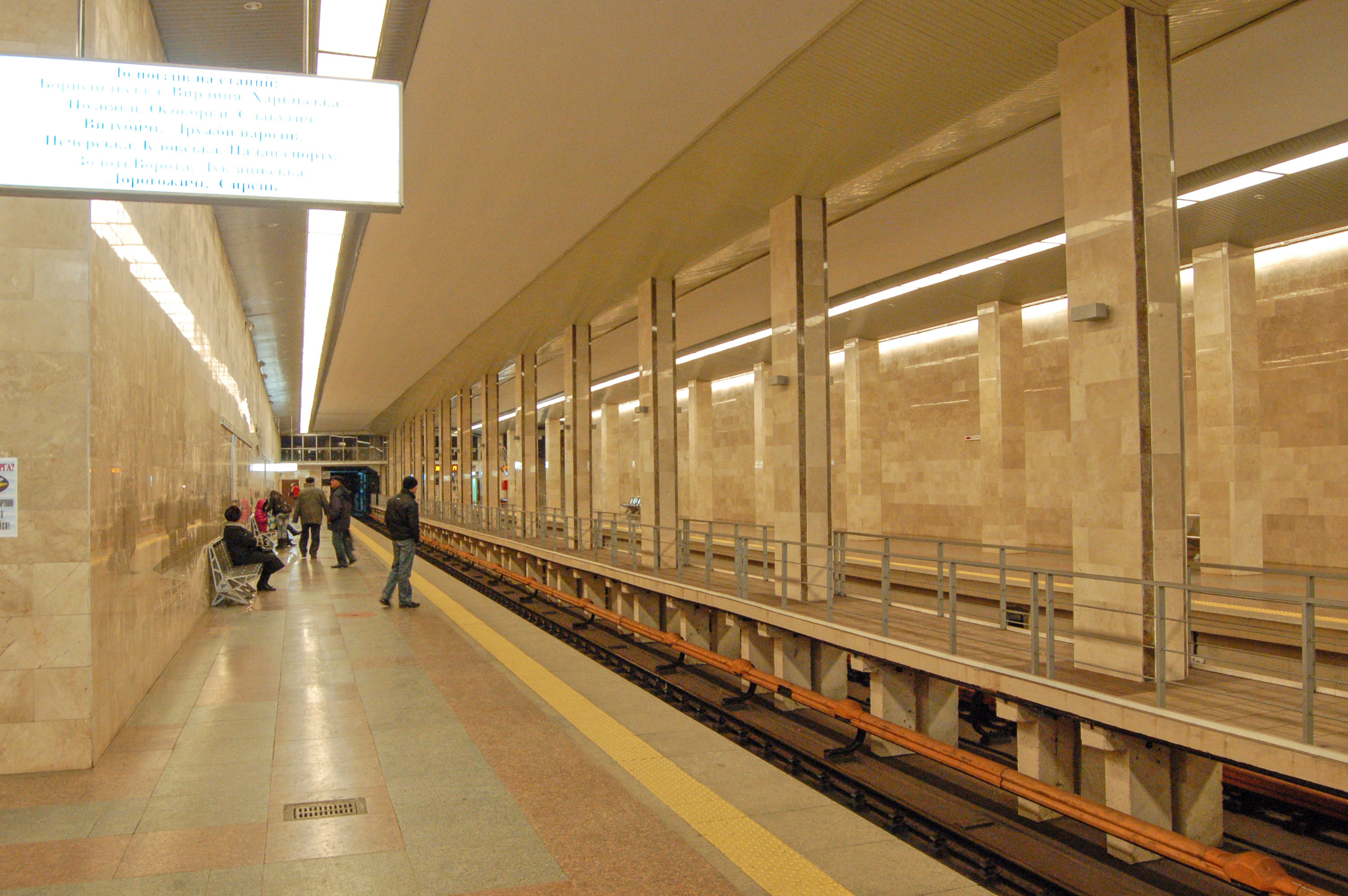
Inbound platform

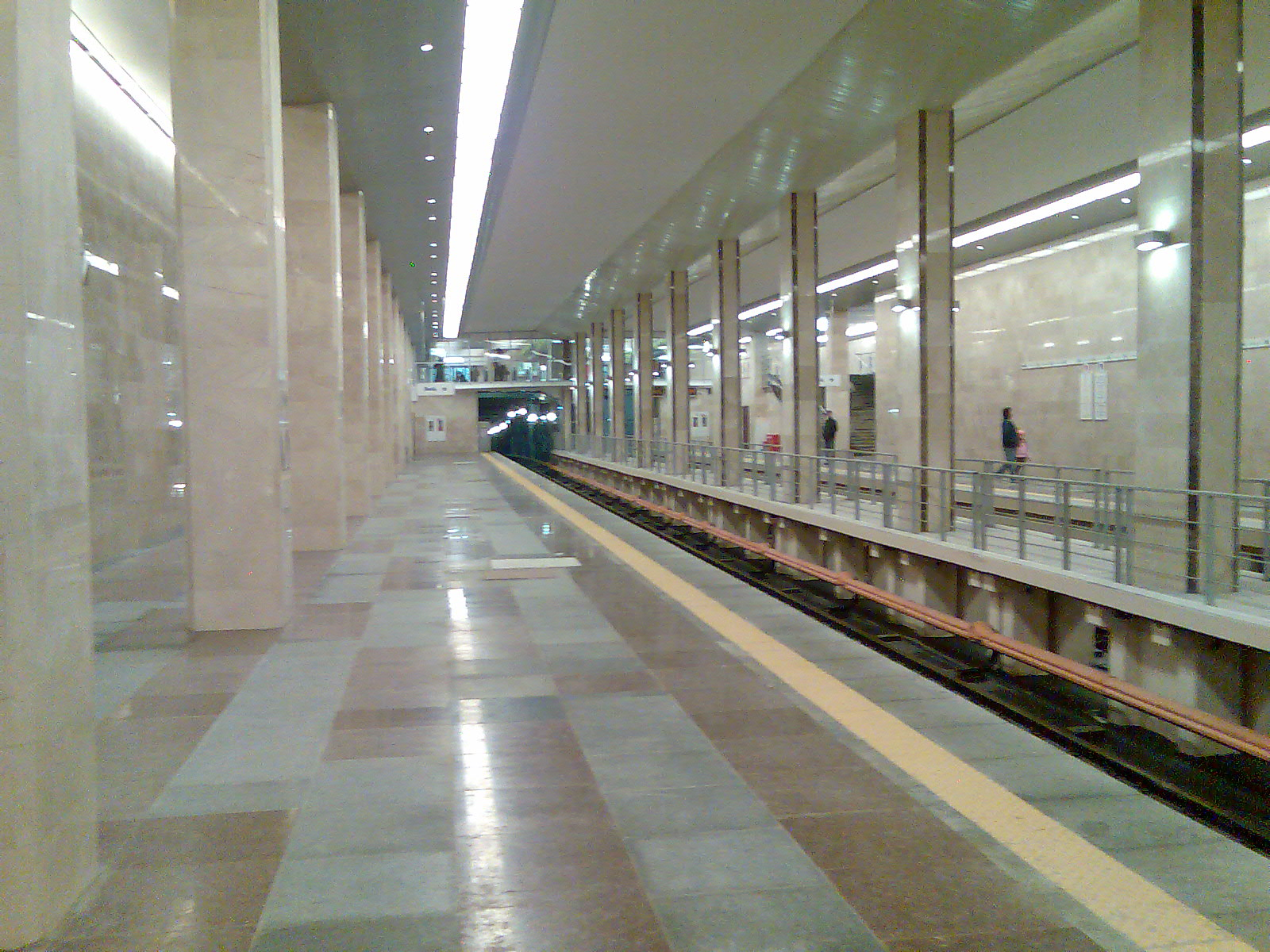
Outbound platform

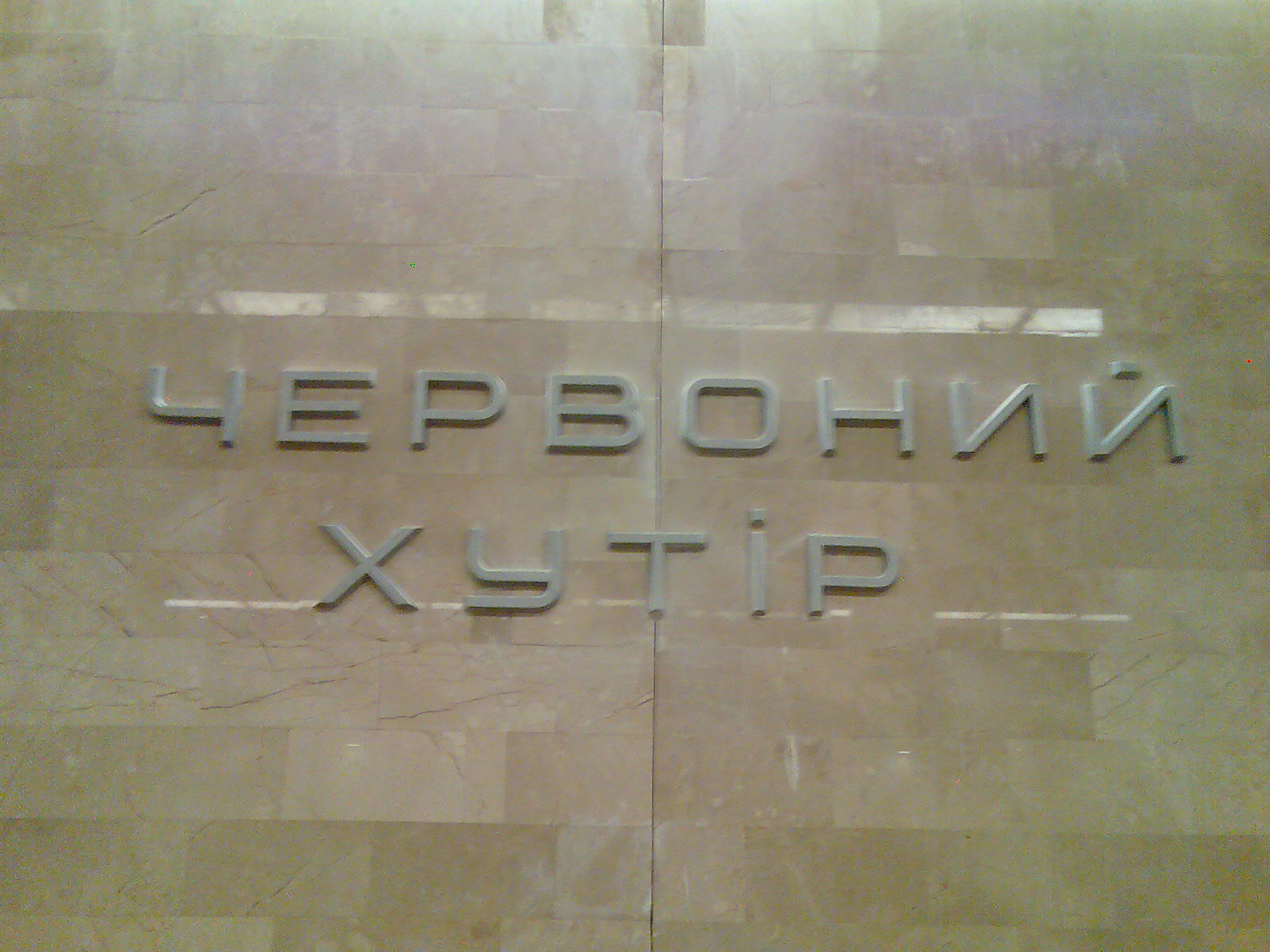
Name of the station on the station wall

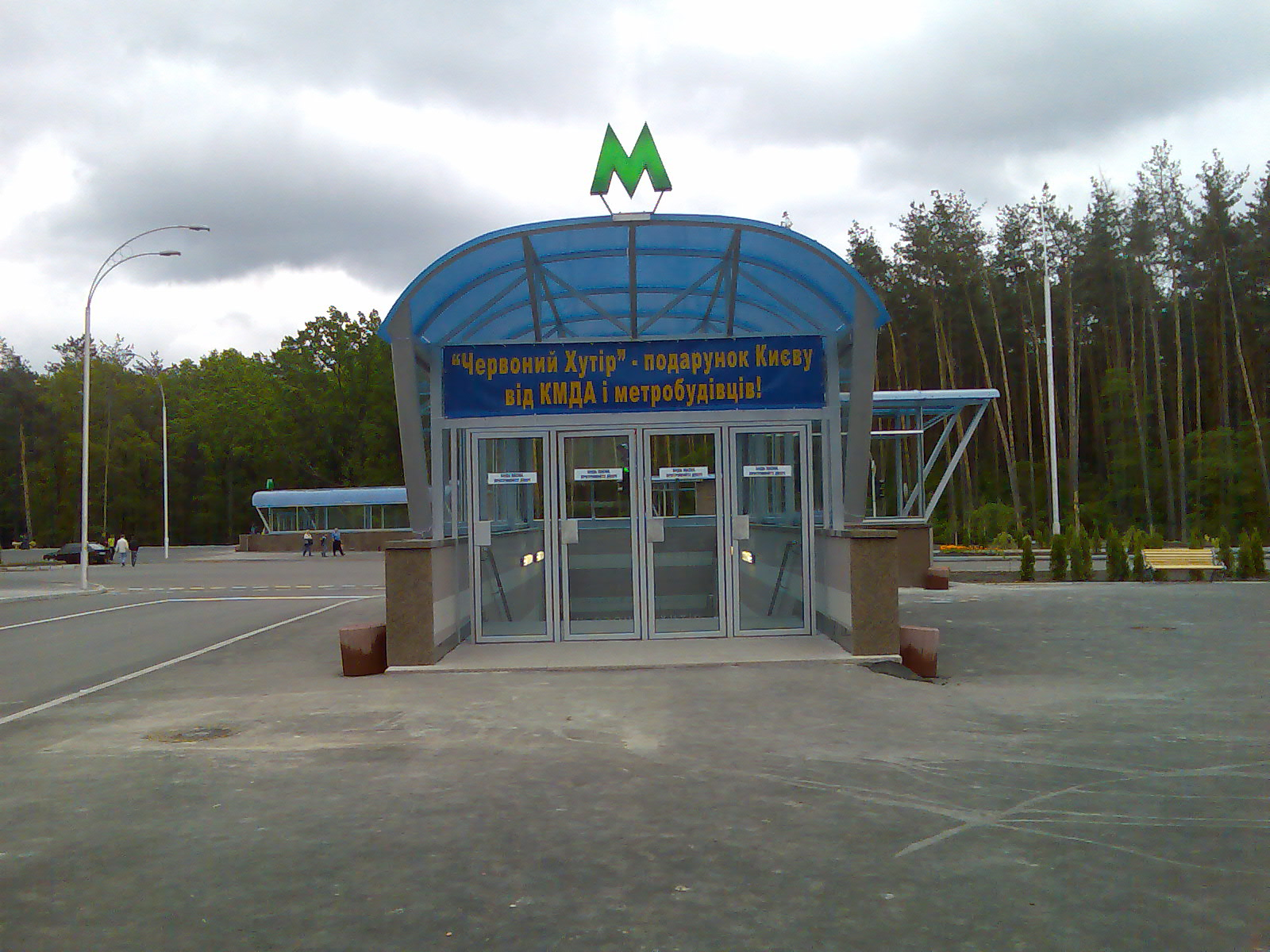
Entrance
