= Darnytskyi District =

Darnytskyi District Дарницький район
- Urban district in Kyiv
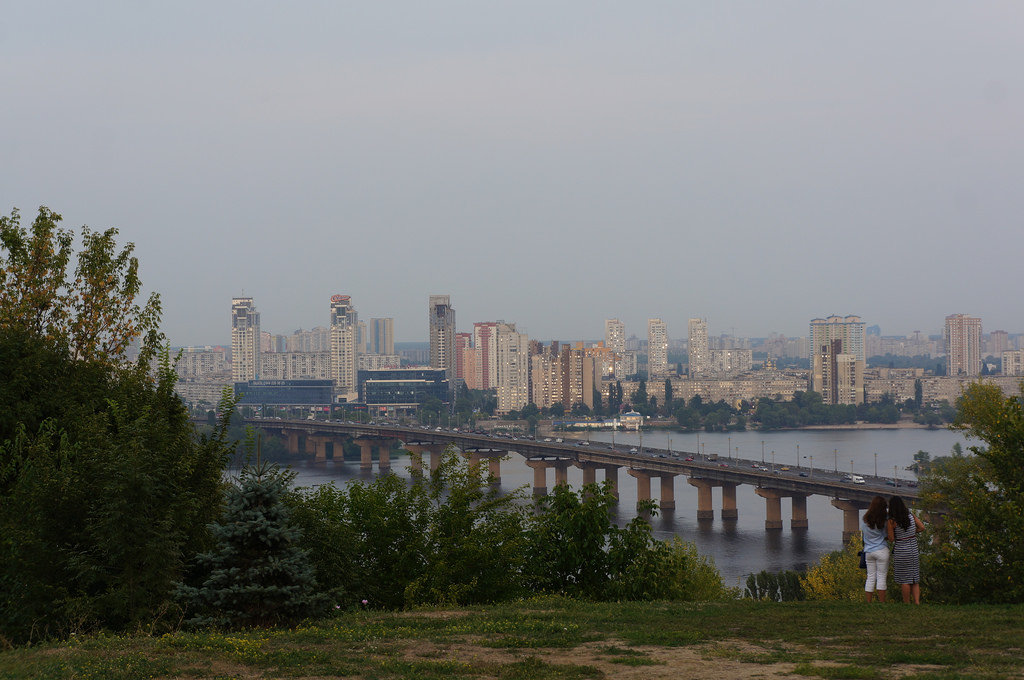
- View on the Left Bank of Dnipro, with Darnytsia neighborhoods seen on the right in the background

- Flag Coat of arms
- Interactive map of Darnytskyi District
- Coordinates: 50°24′22″N 30°40′36″E
- Country: Ukraine
- Municipality: Kyiv Municipality
- Established: 3 April 1935

Government
  - governor: Yaroslav Lahuta

Area
  - Total: 134 km^{2} (52 sq mi)

Population
  - Total: 347,512
- Time zone: UTC+2 (EET)
  - Summer (DST): UTC+3 (EEST)
- Area code: 38044
- Website: https://darn.kyivcity.gov.ua

Darnytskyi District (Note: Ukrainian: Дарницький район, romanized: Darnytskyi raion) is an urban district of Kyiv, the capital of Ukraine. It is located in the south-eastern part of the city on the Left Bank (Note: Informally, Kyiv is subdivided into the Right Bank (Ukrainian: Правий Берег) and the Left bank (Ukrainian: Лівий Берег) on the west and east bank of the Dnieper river respectively.) of the Dnieper River and is the third largest district, with the total area of 134 km². The estimated population of the district is 347,512 inhabitants.

The area was included into the city limits in 1927. In 1935, it was detached into a separate district. The district has assumed its current borders in 2001, merging with Kharkivskyi District as part of the administrative reform in Kyiv. Darnytskyi District borders Holosiivskyi District to its west, across the river, Dniprovskyi District to its north, across the railway, Brovary Raion and Boryspil Raion of Kyiv Oblast to its east and south.

== Historical background ==
Although the exact date of establishment of the area is not known, there is evidence that during the 4th and 3rd centuries BC, a Neolithic settlement existed near lake Sviatyshche (Ukrainian: Святище). During the 9th century, Darnytsia was an important centre of the Kyivan Rus', where ambassadors and delegations from other powers were housed while waiting to meet the kniaz and offer gifts. This gave the area its name Darnytsia (derived from Slavic/Ukrainian dar, meaning gift).

While throughout the 19th century the area was progressively becoming more densely populated, the dwellers were technically residing outside of Kyiv in village-like (but non-village by status) settlements called slobidkas or slobodkas. Certain parts of Darnytsia still bear the names of the slobidkas they displaced, notably Mykilska Sloboda (St. Nicholas settlement).

Until the late 19th century, the name Darnytsia was commonly applied to the plain on the left bank of Dnipro river across from the Kyiv city center. Up to the Bolshevik Revolution in 1917, the area was legally part of the Chernihiv Governorate (Chernihiv), despite being adjacent to Kyiv, also a center of its Guberniya, with the Dnipro river being the official division line. The village of Nova-Darnytsia and the rest of the area of today's raion were incorporated into the city of Kyiv in 1927. In 1935 Darnytsia became a separate raion of the city. With establishment of the Kyiv city Darnytsia Raion, villages Pozniaky and Osokorky were merged and liquidated as separate populated localities.

The urbanized area started industrializing between World War I and World War II, after becoming a part of Kyiv. Following World War II, the area underwent a major reconstruction and modernization and became heavily industrialized, with the installation of chemical, textile, pharmaceutical, and food processing industries. Major infrastructure projects, including heat-and-power co-generation units, railroad stations, highways, and Metro lines were accomplished. Several research institutes found their new home here, including three major chemical institutes of the National Academy of Sciences of Ukraine.

== Population ==
=== Language ===
Distribution of the population by native language according to the 2001 census:

Language	Number	Percentage
Ukrainian	218 956	77.91%
Russian	57 699	20.53%
Other (Note: Those who did not indicate their native language or indicated a language that was native to less than 1% of the local population.)	4 369	1.56%
Total	281 024	100.00%

== Overview ==
Today, the term Darnytsia is sometimes broadly (but incorrectly) applied to the entire Left Bank area of Kyiv, except the distant areas of Vyhurivshchyna-Troieshchyna to the North and Pozniaky to the South. Formally, the district underwent many border changes, and today encompasses approximately one-third of the Left Bank. A planned district change could make Darnytsia district either expand to encompass half of the Left Bank area or cease to exist being redistributed between Desnianskyi District and Dniprovskyi District.

Neighborhood

The Darnytsia neighborhood borders are generally understood to be:

- Mykilska Slobidka, Rusanivka Island and Berezniaky to the West
- Voskresenka, Troieshchyna and Lisovyi masyv to the North
- Bykivnia neighborhood and the town of Bortnychi to the East
- Pozniaky, Osokorky and Kharkivskyi masyv to the South

== See also ==
- Subdivisions of Kyiv
- New Darnytskyi Bridge
- Darnytsia concentration camp
