= Zoloti Vorota (Kyiv Metro) =

Kyiv Metro Station

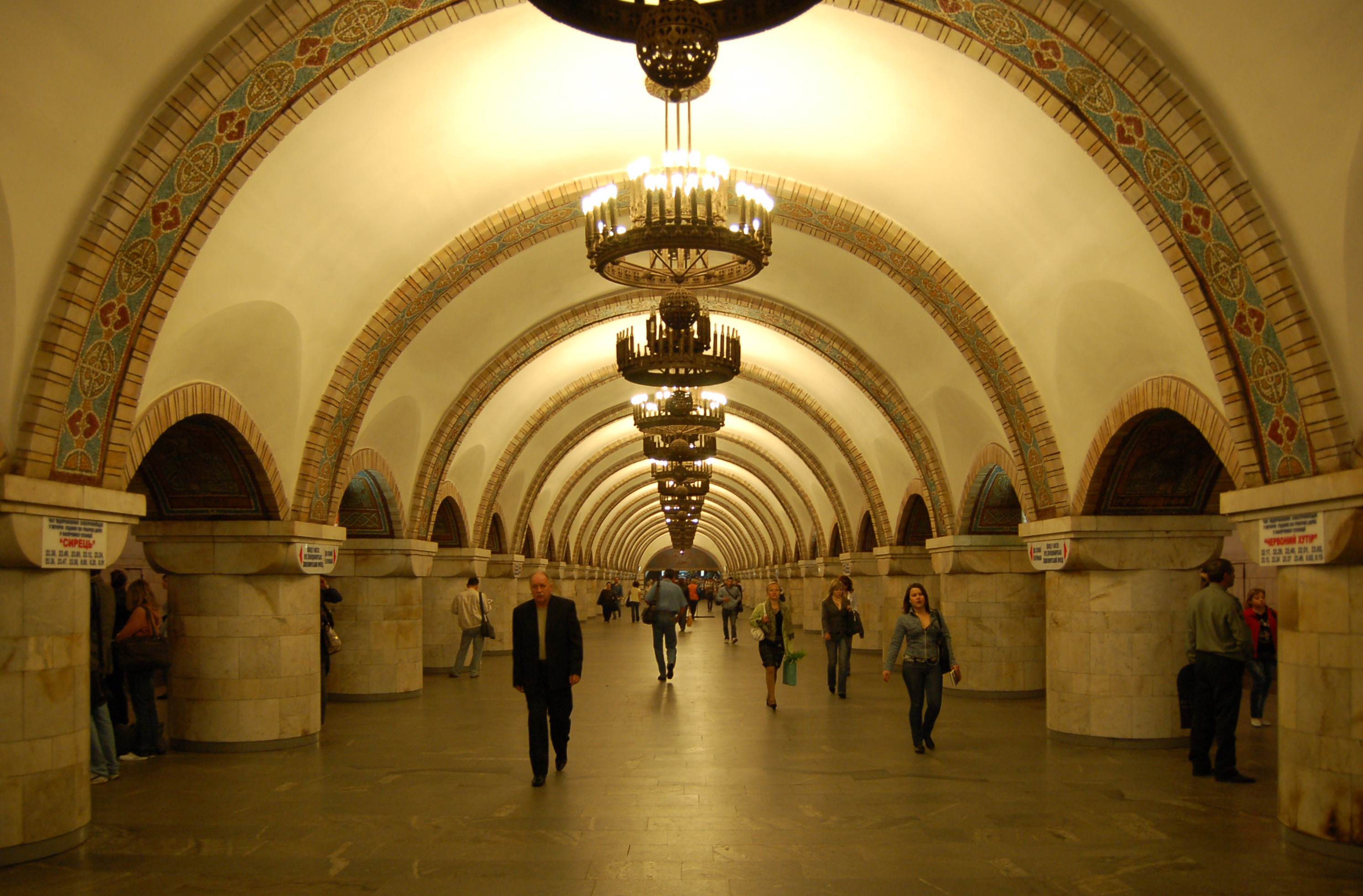
- The central hall is covered with mosaic decorated arcs reminiscent of ancient Rus' temple architecture.

General information
- Location: 42, Volodymyrska Street, Shevchenkivskyi District; Kyiv; Ukraine
- Coordinates: 50°26′54″N 30°30′48″E
- System: Kyiv Metro station
- Owner: Kyivpastrans
- Line: Syretsko–Pecherska line

Construction
- Structure type: Deep column station
- Depth: 96.5 m (317 ft)
- Architect: Vadym and Boris Zhezherin; Mykola Zharikov

History
- Opened: 31 December 1989

Passengers
- 2008: 20,000 (daily)

Services
Preceding station	Kyiv Metro	Following station
Lukianivska towards Syrets	Syretsko–Pecherska line	Palats Sportu towards Chervonyi Khutir
Universytet towards Akademmistechko	Sviatoshynsko–Brovarska line transfer at Teatralna	Khreshchatyk towards Lisova
Route map
Location

Zoloti Vorota (Ukrainian: Золоті ворота, lit. 'Golden Gate') is a station on the Kyiv Metro system that serves Kyiv, the capital city of Ukraine. The station was opened as part of the first segment of the Syretsko–Pecherska line on 31 December 1989. It serves as a transfer station to the Teatralna station of the Sviatoshynsko–Brovarska line. It is located near the city's Golden Gate, for which the station is named.

The original design plans for the station called for a clean utilitarian structure typical of metro stations of that period. Due to the efforts of the city's chief architect Mykola Zharikov, the design was scrapped in favor of one that resembles an ancient Kievan Rus' temple by Borys Zhezherin, Vadym Zhezherin, and Zharikov himself. Such a design was a particularly risky feat, since Ukraine was a part of the secular Soviet Union at the time of the station's construction. Zhezherin and Zharikov, among the other artists and architects of the station, were bestowed the State Prize of Ukraine in the Field of Architecture for their work in 1991.

The Zoloti Vorota features 80 distinct mosaic pieces and images depicting the history of Kievan Rus'. In 2011, the station's mosaics were listed as "newly discovered objects of cultural heritage" by the city's Department of Cultural Heritage. The station is regarded as one of the most impressive metro stations in Europe, being placed on a list compiled by The Daily Telegraph in 2013.

== Construction ==
The initial plans for the future Syretsko–Pecherska line called for a transfer station (named "Kominternivska") to connect with the Sviatoshynsko–Brovarska line at Universytet station. However, the short central hall at Universytet was inadequate for the high volume of passengers that a transfer station would be subject to, thus the station's future location was moved a few city blocks to coincide with a newly proposed station of the Sviatoshynsko–Brovarska line. This new station, called Teatralna, would be located in between the Khreshchatyk and Universytet stations, and would serve as a transfer to the future Zoloti Vorota station. Although the Kominternivska station was never built, some of its architectural designs were preserved and used in the creation of the Teatralna station.

Construction for the Syretsko–Pecherska line, the Kyiv Metro system's third line, began on 23 February 1983. It had a projected date of completion in 1986, although the line's opening was delayed until the end of 1989 due to the economic state of the Soviet Union at the time. The line's first segment was officially opened on 31 December 1989, and consisted of three stations; Zoloti Vorota–Palats Sportu–Mechnikova (named Klovska today).

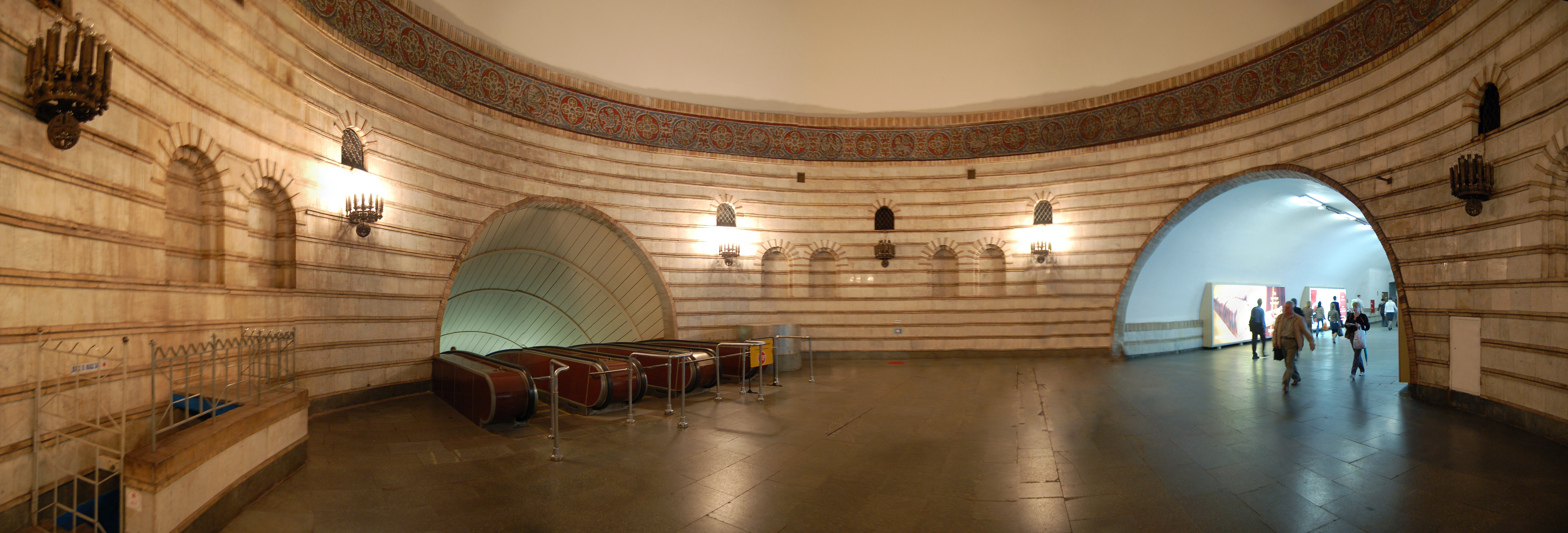
The station is located at a depth of 96.5 m (317 ft), creating the need for an underground vestibule in between the two escalator tunnels.

Since its entrance is located on a hillside, two separate escalator tunnels had to be created, connected by an underground station vestibule. The upper tunnel is 35 m (115 ft) long, while the lower tunnel is 56 m (184 ft) long. The vestibule was built in the same way as with other stations of the Kyiv Metro system; it was first completed at ground level, and then lowered to its final location underground. The vestibule is a 20 m (66 ft) tall monolithic dome with an approximately similar diameter.

The installation began in November 1987 and was completed by 1988, lowered at a pace of half a meter a day. Since the construction took place in water-saturated soils, over 200 frozen wells had to be formed so it could be lowered to its proper location. In addition, over 250 m^{2} (300 yd^{2}) of rock had to be removed to make way for the vestibule. After it was finally installed, construction work began on the lower escalator tunnel. Due to a difficult hydrogeology, the tunnel was not completed by the station's grand opening and until 1 May 1990, it could only be reached with a transfer from the Teatralna station.

For several years, the Zoloti Vorota station served as the line's northern terminus. Continued construction extended the line northwards to the Lukianivska station. In between the two stations, the Lvivska Brama station was built during the late 1990s; however, it has not been completed to this day.

== Design ==
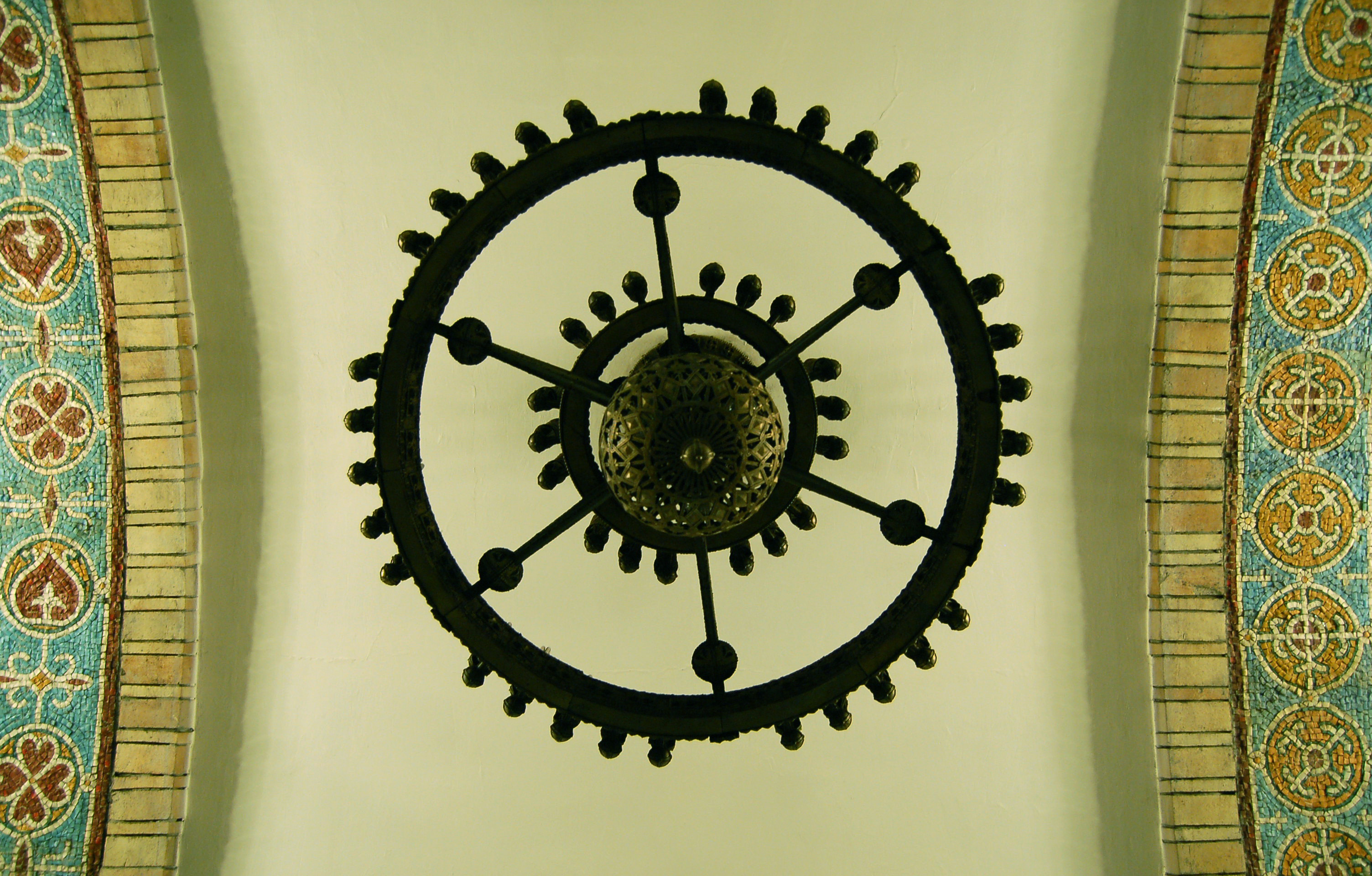
The station's massive chandeliers, flanked by the ceiling's mosaic pieces

From an engineering standpoint, Zoloti Vorota was built as a deep column station, at a depth of 96.5 m (317 ft) underground. It consists of three distinct vaulted halls, featuring one central hall, and two side platform halls, each separated by a row of columns. The central hall is connected to the only above-ground vestibule through two escalator tunnels, separated by an underground vestibule, which was needed because of the depth at which the station is located. Its design and formation is nearly similar to the Maidan Nezalezhnosti station of the system's Obolonsko–Teremkivska line.

The station's original plans were designed by a team of Moscow architects from Metrogiprotrans; their design was strictly utilitarian, architecturally similar to the other metro stations of that period. However, due to the socio-economic changes taking place in the country at the time, the original design was scrapped because it was considered "too weak" for one of the city's main metro stations in a historically significant location.

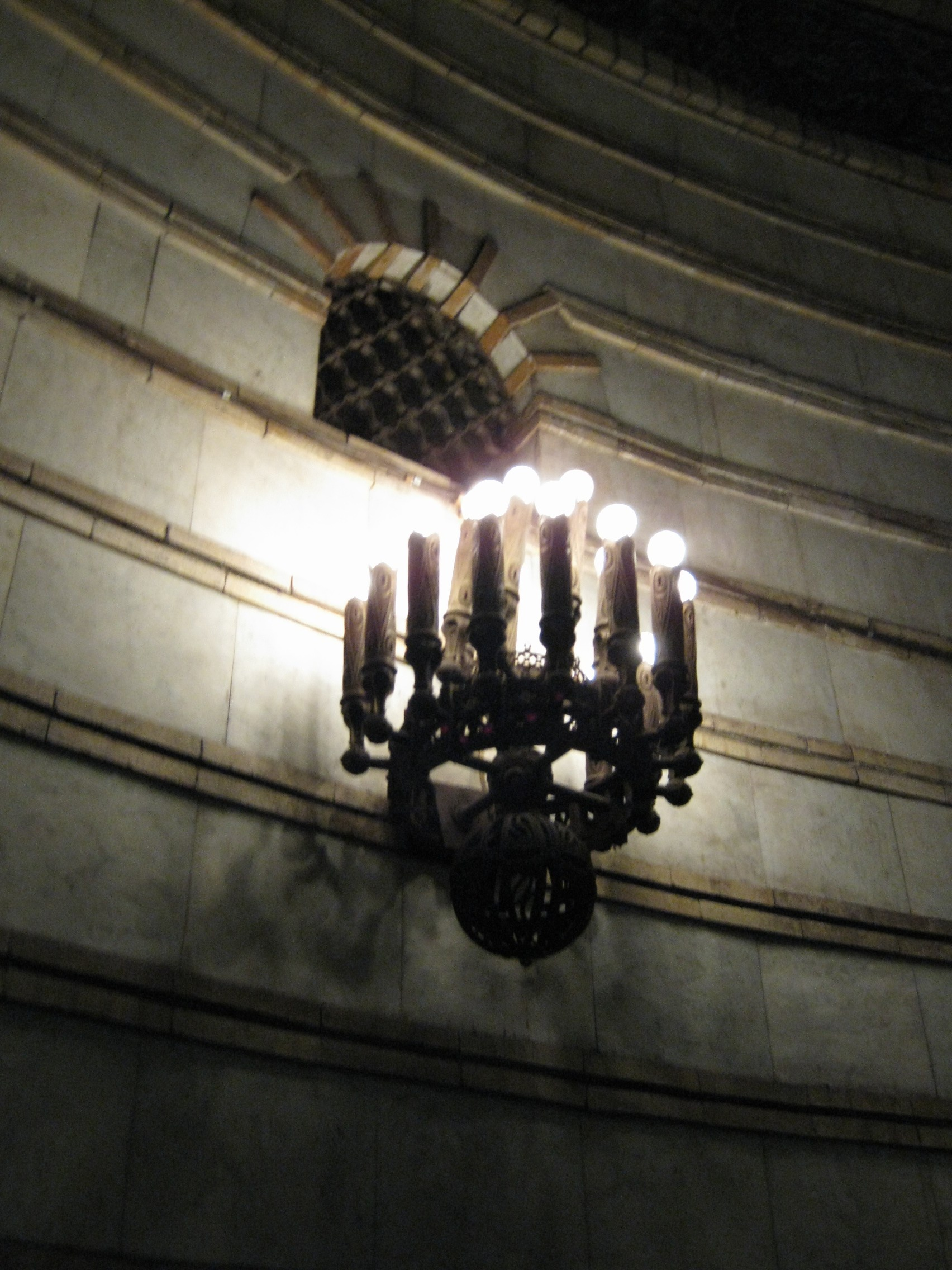
Close-up of a light fixture in the station's underground vestibule

The city's chief architect Mykola Zharikov approached Vadym Zhezherin to create a new design for the station. Zhezherin enlisted the help of his father, Borys in completing the design. Vadym previously worked on the reconstruction of the city's Leo Tolstoy Square and similarly named metro station, while his father, who was awarded the title of Distinguished Architect of Ukraine, was responsible for the reconstruction of the nearby National Opera House.

They were supported by architects Anatoliy Krushynskyi, Tamara Tselikovska, and Fedir Zaremba, who were responsible for designing the underground vestibule. While the redesign was taking place, construction on the station's original utilitarian design continued. The new design was based on the form of a Kievan Rus' temple, featuring unique mosaics situated throughout the station. The central hall's height was increased, and the original design's pylons were replaced with much lower columns, finished off with white marble and matte polish. In particular, the white ceiling was divided with diametrical mosaic stripes with brick grouting on the sides, completed by artists Hryhoriy Korin and Volodymyr Fedko.

The station is illuminated by two-tierd bronze chandeliers, each featuring 12 distinct lighting groups holding candle-like bulbs. The chandeliers, designed by Stanislav Adamenko and Mariya Ralko, were installed between the mosaic stripes. Both the station halls and the underground vestibule feature similar light fixtures, although they are significantly smaller than the main chandeliers. The redesign also called for a gold smalt-covered ceiling, although this was rejected as it was too expensive. To finish it off, gray granite was used on the floor.

== Mosaics ==
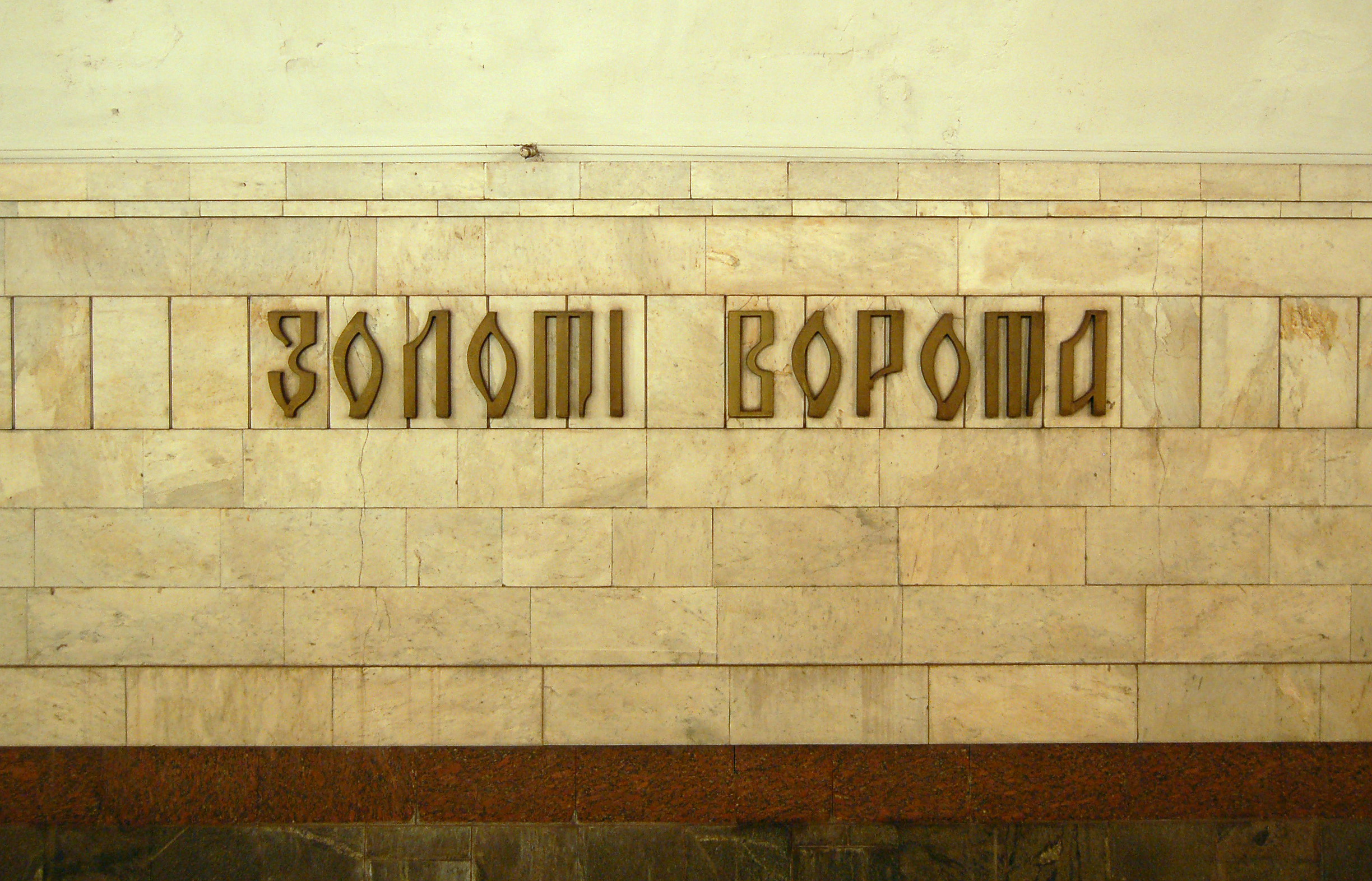
Close-up of the gold name inscription which was carried out in an ancient Rus'-style font

The Zoloti Vorota station features a number of distinct mosaic decorations, which were completed by artists Hryhoriy Korin and Volodymyr Fedko. There are a total of 80 large mosaic pieces; they run in a clockwise direction around the station, depicting the history of Kievan Rus'. The two artists, accompanied by the station's lead architect Vadym Zhezherin, concluded that the station should be decorated with mosaic pieces of historical significance of the period leading up to the Mongol invasion of Rus'. Korin completed the mosaics in either ends of the station and the large ceiling arches, while Fedko was completed the unique images relating to Kievan Rus' and the smaller arches in between each of the station's pillars.

Four large mosaic panels are installed on either ends of the station hall and the two escalator tunnels. On the side that leads to the exit to the city, a panel was installed depicting the patron saint of Kyiv, Michael the Archangel. Meanwhile, at the very end of the station, Saint George is depicted, symbolizing Moscow, the Soviet Union's capital at the time. One of the mosaic panels at the end of the station near the escalators includes an inscription featuring a Ukrainian nationalist slogan, stating СЛАВА УКРАЇНІ (Glory to Ukraine).

A large portion of the station's mosaics depict the various Grand Princes of Kievan Rus', of which 27 are depicted. The mosaic pieces themselves incorporate the princes' years of reigning and their names:

- Kyi
- Shchek
- Khoryv
- Lybid
- Askold
- Dir
- Oleg of Novgorod
- Igor of Kiev
- Olga of Kiev
- Sviatoslav I of Kiev
- Vladimir the Great
- Yaroslav the Wise
- Iziaslav I of Kiev
- Vsevolod I of Kiev
- Sviatopolk II of Kiev
- Vladimir II Monomakh
- Mstislav I of Kiev
- Yaropolk II of Kiev
- Vsevolod II of Kiev
- Iziaslav II of Kiev
- Rostislav I of Kiev
- Roman I of Kiev
- Sviatoslav III of Kiev
- Rurik Rostislavich
- Mstislav III of Kiev
- Vladimir IV Rurikovich
- Daniel of Galicia

The station also has nine mosaics depicting various other important personalities of the Kievan Rus' era featuring Anthony, Theodosius, Anne, Hilarion, Agapetus, Alypius, Nestor the Chronicler, Petro Mylonig, and Sylvester. Eight of the mosaic pieces depict Kyiv's ancient Rus' churches including the Church of the Tithes, the Saint Sophia Cathedral, St. Irene Church, St. Michael's Golden-Domed Cathedral, Church of the Saviour at Berestove, Dormition Cathedral, Church of the Mother of God Pyrohoshcha, and the St. Cyril's Monastery. Lastly, there are 32 mosaic pieces featuring simargls, which are mythical creatures in East Slavic mythology, often depicted as a winged lion or dog.

Examples of station mosaics
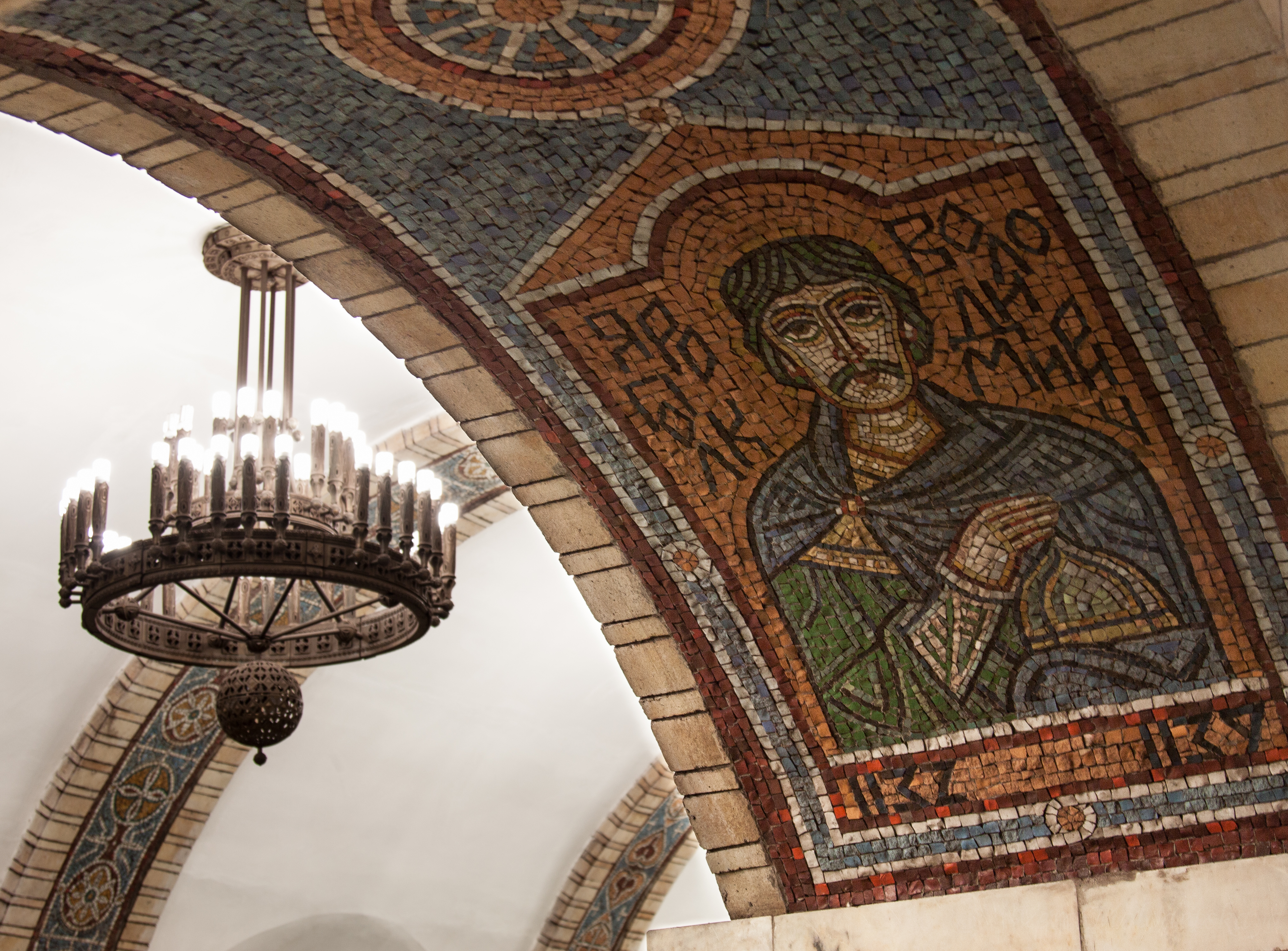
Mosaic depicting Yaropolk II of Kiev with one of the chandeliers seen in the background

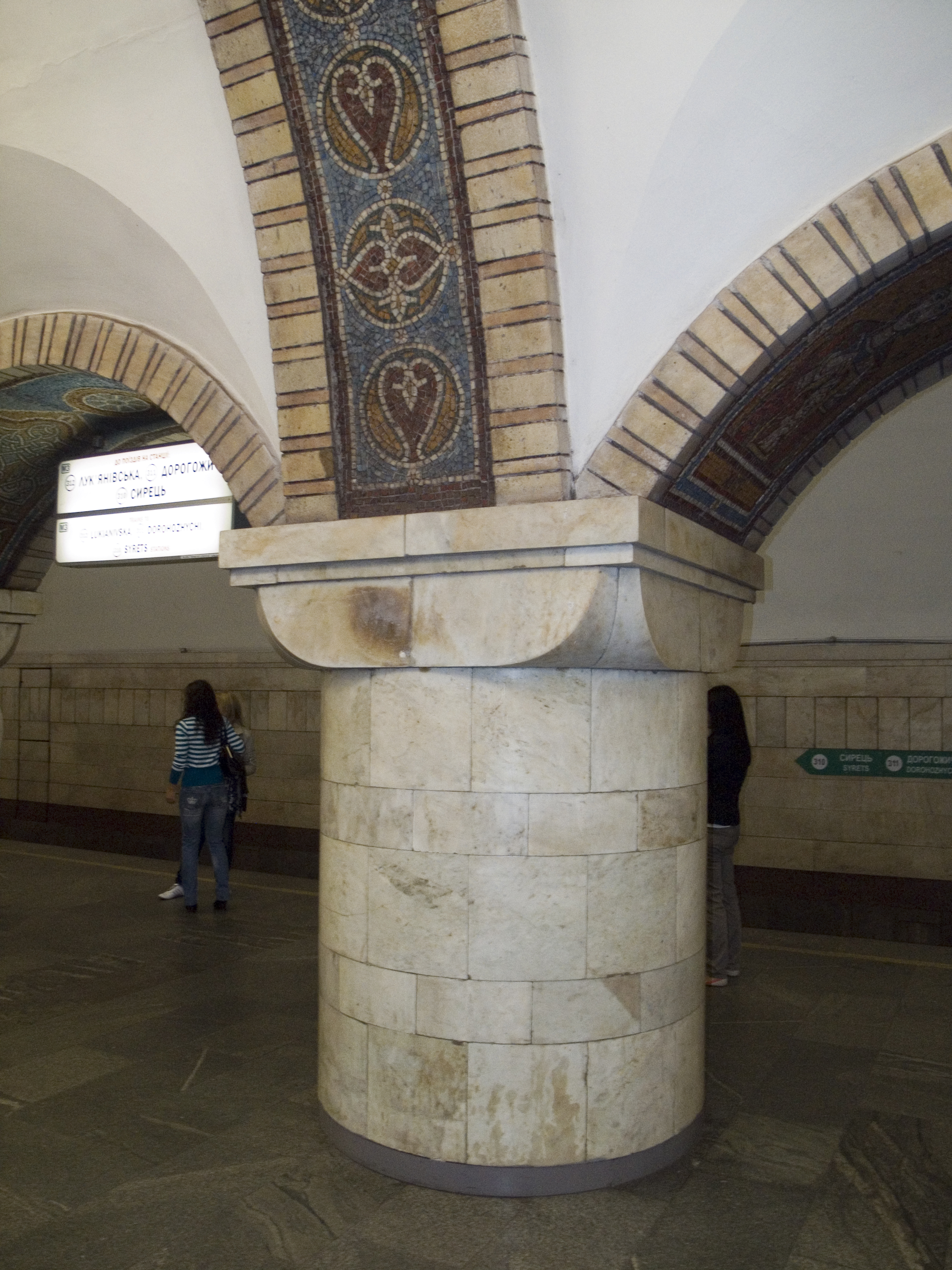
An example of the mosaics covering the station's white marble covered pillars

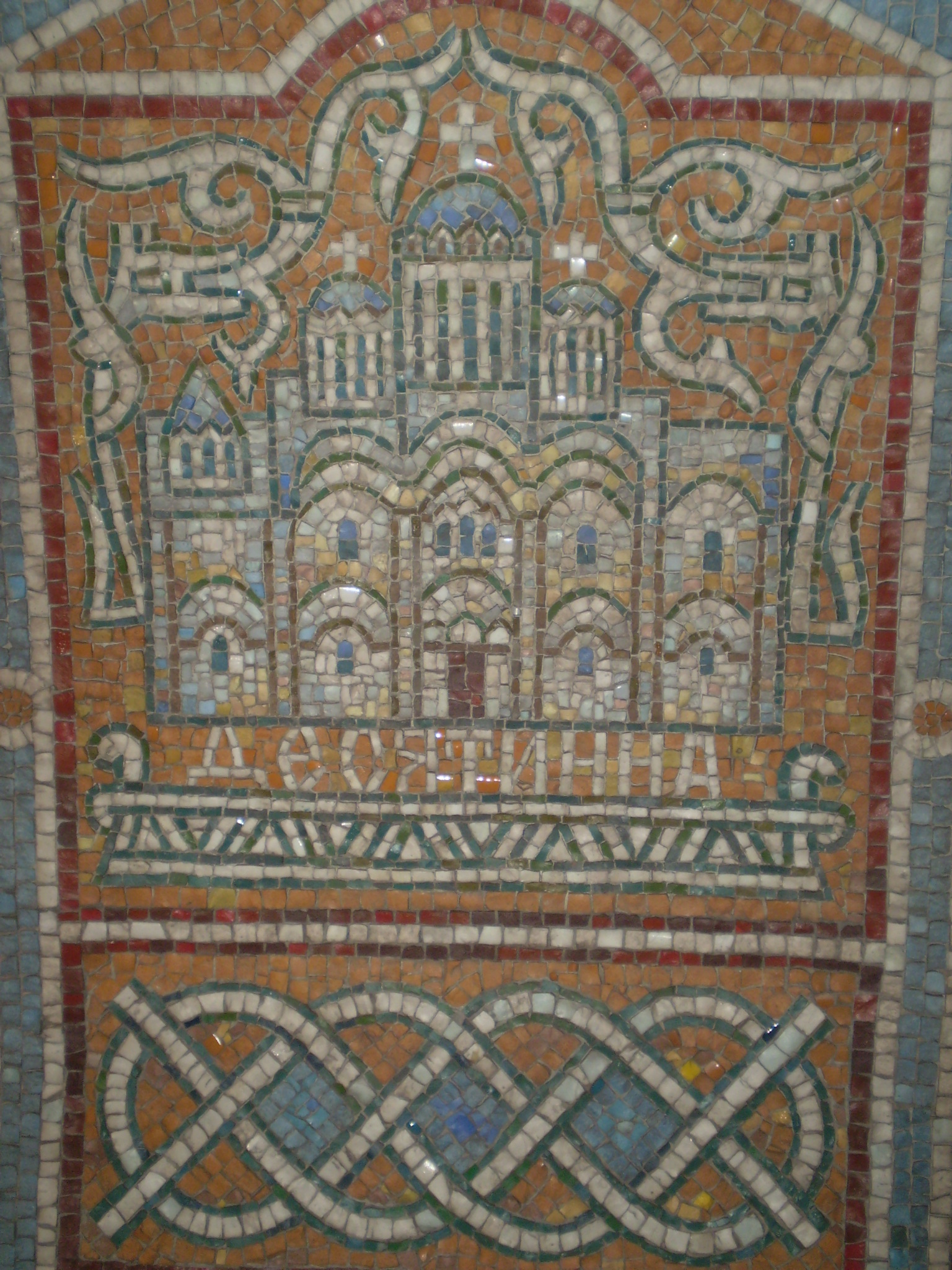
Mosaic depicting the Church of the Tithes, which was destroyed by the Bolsheviks in 1928

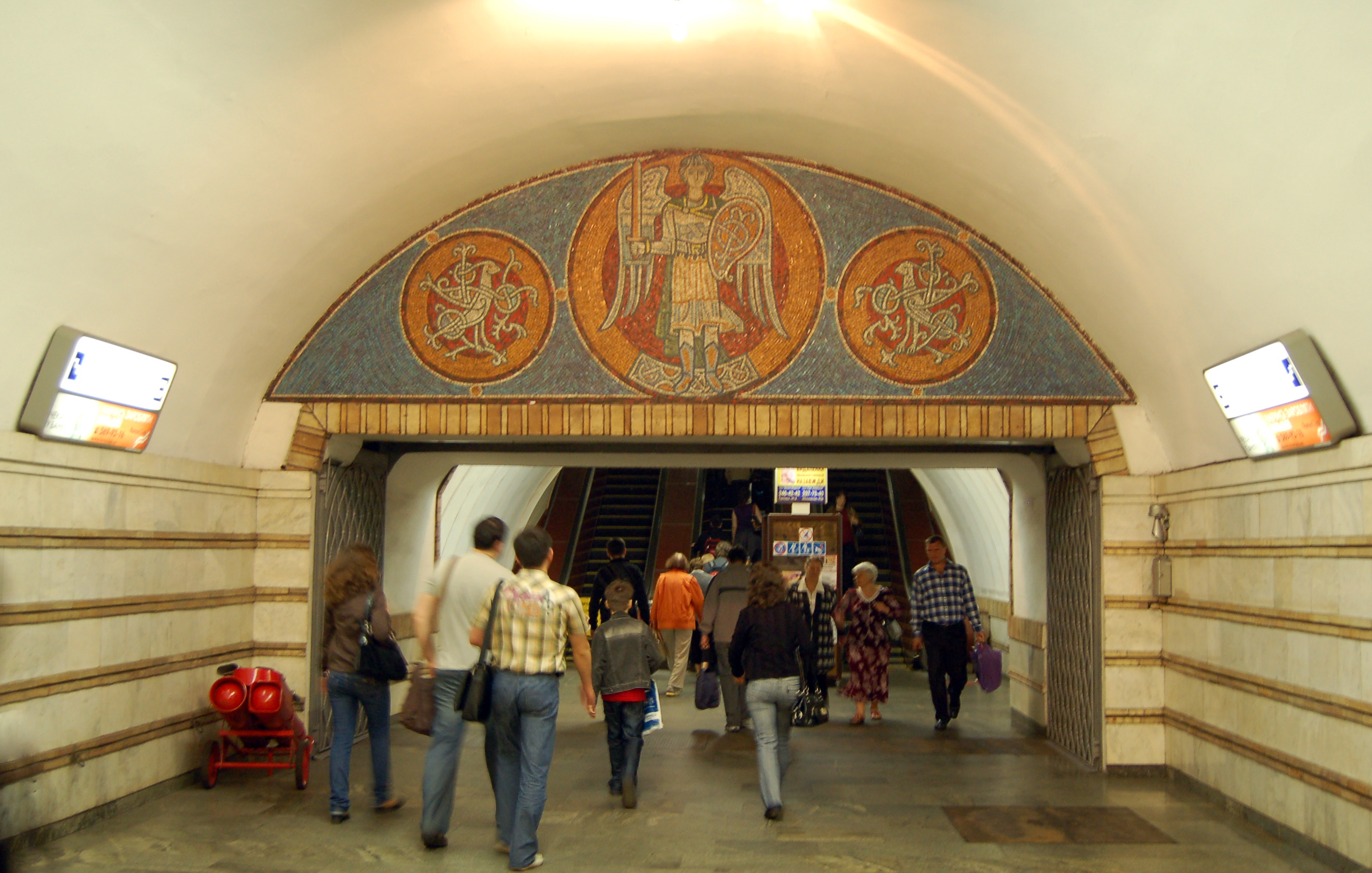
Mosaics depicting the patron saint of Kyiv, Michael the Archangel, flanked by two mythical creatures
See more on the Wikimedia Commons

== Service ==
The Zoloti Vorota station has only two street entrances, one of which is located on Volodymyrska Street, and the other on Zoloti Vorota Passage. Each of the entrances are connected by a single vestibule in the city center near the Golden Gate, and Ukraine's National Opera building. As of 2008, the Zoloti Vorota station has a daily ridership of 20,000. The station itself is operational every day from 05:39 to 00:06, while the transfer tunnel which connects Zoloti Vorota to Teatralna is open from 05:45 to 00:32. The station features six escalators, with the upper and lower vestibules both having two operating escalators, with an additional backup escalator.

The commute from Zoloti Vorota to the line's terminus at Syrets takes approximately 9 minutes and 5 seconds, while it takes 30 minutes and 55 seconds to commute to the Chervony Khutir terminus. The train frequencies vary throughout the day, but generally operate every 2–13 minutes in either direction. The morning's first eastbound train departs from the station at 05:48, while the westbound train departs at 06:01. The evening's last eastbound departs at 00:15, while the westbound train departs at 00:30.

The entire Kyiv Metro system uses the same methods of payment for transit via each station; plastic tokens, temporary paper contactless cards, and reloadable plastic contactless cards. In June 2015, the station was outfitted with Paypass functionality, a contactless payment service from MasterCard. It is one of seventeen strategic stations of the metro system to use this technology, making Kyiv the fifth rapid transit system in the world to incorporate this technology.

During the 2022 Russian invasion of Ukraine, the station was used as a bomb shelter, along with other stations of the Kyiv Metro.

Preceded by None	Syretsko–Pecherska line terminus 31 December 1989 – 30 March 1996	Succeeded by Palats Sportu
