= Initiative for St. Andrew's Passage =

- Андріївсько-Пейзажна Ініціатива
- Established: 2012
- Type: Non-governmental organization
- Location: Kyiv, Ukraine
- President: Maryna Soloviova

Initiative for St. Andrew's Passage (Ukrainian: Андріївсько-Пейзажна Ініціатива, romanized: Andriyivsko-Peizazhna Initsiatyva) is a Ukrainian non-governmental organization (NGO) that was created for consolidation of the numerous civil organizations and initiatives. Its mission is to protect and conserve the historical and cultural heritage as well as the natural environment. In September 2012 Initiative for St. Andrew's Passage was officially recognized by virtue of the State registration and is acting under its own Statute.

== International cooperation ==
Initiative for St. Andrew's Passage is a well-known organization with an established network of partners at the local, national and international levels. The NGO is an official member of Europa Nostra, a European organization in the field of cultural heritage. Since 2014 member of the NGO Natalia Moussienko has been a Member of the Europa Nostra Council.

Since 2011 the representatives of the NGO, Maryna Soloviova and Iryna Nikiforova have taken part in the World Heritage Committee sessions (35th-40th sessions) as individual observers in order to monitor the committee's decisions concerning Object 527, Kyiv: Saint Sophia Cathedral and Related Monastic Buildings, Kyiv Pechersk Lavra, and to establish and maintain contacts with the international colleagues and heritage experts from ICOMOS and UNESCO.

Members of the NGO participated in the International Forums of Non-governmental organizations on the protection of cultural heritage.

Thanks to close cooperation with the Local authorities and Vitaly Klichko, the Mayor of Kyiv, some amendments concerning reducing the height of dissonant buildings in the historical part of Kyiv, were made to the Draft decision of the 39th World Heritage Committee session. Due to this, two stories of the building, that was already built in Desyatynny Lane, 3–5, in the buffer zone of Saint-Sophia Cathedral, were demolished in 2015.

To draw the attention of the international society and for the popularization of the Ukrainian history and culture, the NGO have signed the Agreement of friendship and cooperation with the French Association Syndicate of Initiatives of Montmartre (Paris, 2012) and declared two streets — Montmartre (Paris) and St. Andrew's Descent (Kyiv) as “street-twins”, based on its cultural heritage. Within this cooperation, the photo exhibition of Kyiv's historical and cultural monuments in Montmartre (2012) and an exhibition of paintings by a famous French artist on St. Andrew's Descent (2013) were held. Also, as a symbol of the Ukrainian-French friendship, the vines from Montmartre were planted on Peyzazhna Alley in Kyiv.

== Activity ==
The NGO is a co-founder of the Board of Trustees of the National Reserve “The Saint-Sophia Cathedral”.

Maryna Soloviova and Irina Nevmerzhytska, the lawyers of Initiative for St. Andrew's Passage, represent public interests and protect the property of the historical and cultural heritage in Kyiv in numerous court proceedings. Thanks to their activity, a lot of illegal land acquisitions have been returned to the city community. On their initiative and with the support of local inhabitants and sponsors, the 1st Ukrainian children's landscape park on Peyzazhna Alley with unique mosaic sculptures and fountains was created. In fact, it received a status of a Work of Art.

Moreover, the NGO initiated the creation of the Park of Kyiv Intellectuals, represented by the birds' sculptures, in Honchar street in Kyiv; a mosaic panel with kids pictures in Striletska street and others.

Furthermore, the NGO has achieved the amplification of the official status of the buffer zone of Saint Sophia Cathedral, by means of the judicial order. As a result, the territory of the buffer zone has been declared as “especially valuable lands” and was inscribed in the automated system of the land register of Ukraine.

The NGO initiated and in some cases filed the claims against the land grabbing and development in the historical center of Kyiv, namely Peyzazhna Alley, O. Honchar str., 1–3, O. Honchar str., 5–7, O. Honchar str., 17–23, Striletska str., 10/1, Desyatynny Lane, Gostynny Dvir and others. In partnership with the international organization Freedom House, the NGO is implementing the project on returning Observatorna Girka (Observatorna str., 3) to the municipal property.

Thanks to the long-term and permanent collaboration with the local authorities, namely Vitaly Klichko, the Mayor of Kyiv, and the Kyiv City State Administration on the preparation of the moratorium for all new development projects in the buffer zone of the World Heritage property, it was finally adopted by the Kyiv City Council on 22 January 2015. Indeed, the World Heritage Committee has been requesting Ukraine to impose the moratorium on all high-rise and non-conforming buildings within the buffer zone of the World Heritage property since 2009.

Recognizing the importance of the awareness raising about the protection and preservation of the Ukrainian cultural and historical monuments and national traditions, the revival of national spirit and identity, the NGO communicates and cooperates with other non-governmental organizations, media and provides numerous activities, “round tables”, press conferences etc.

=== Anna-Fest ===
The first Art and historical festival “Anna-Fest” devoted to Anna, the Queen of France and the daughter of Yaroslav the Wise, was organized in 2015 on the territory of the National Reserve “The Saint-Sophia Cathedral”. The festival was held with the participation and support of the NGO Initiative for St. Andrew's Passage, the Ministry of Culture of Ukraine, the National Reserve “The Saint-Sophia Cathedral”, other Non-governmental organizations and charity funds.

=== Restoration of tracing of the Desyatynna Church foundations ===
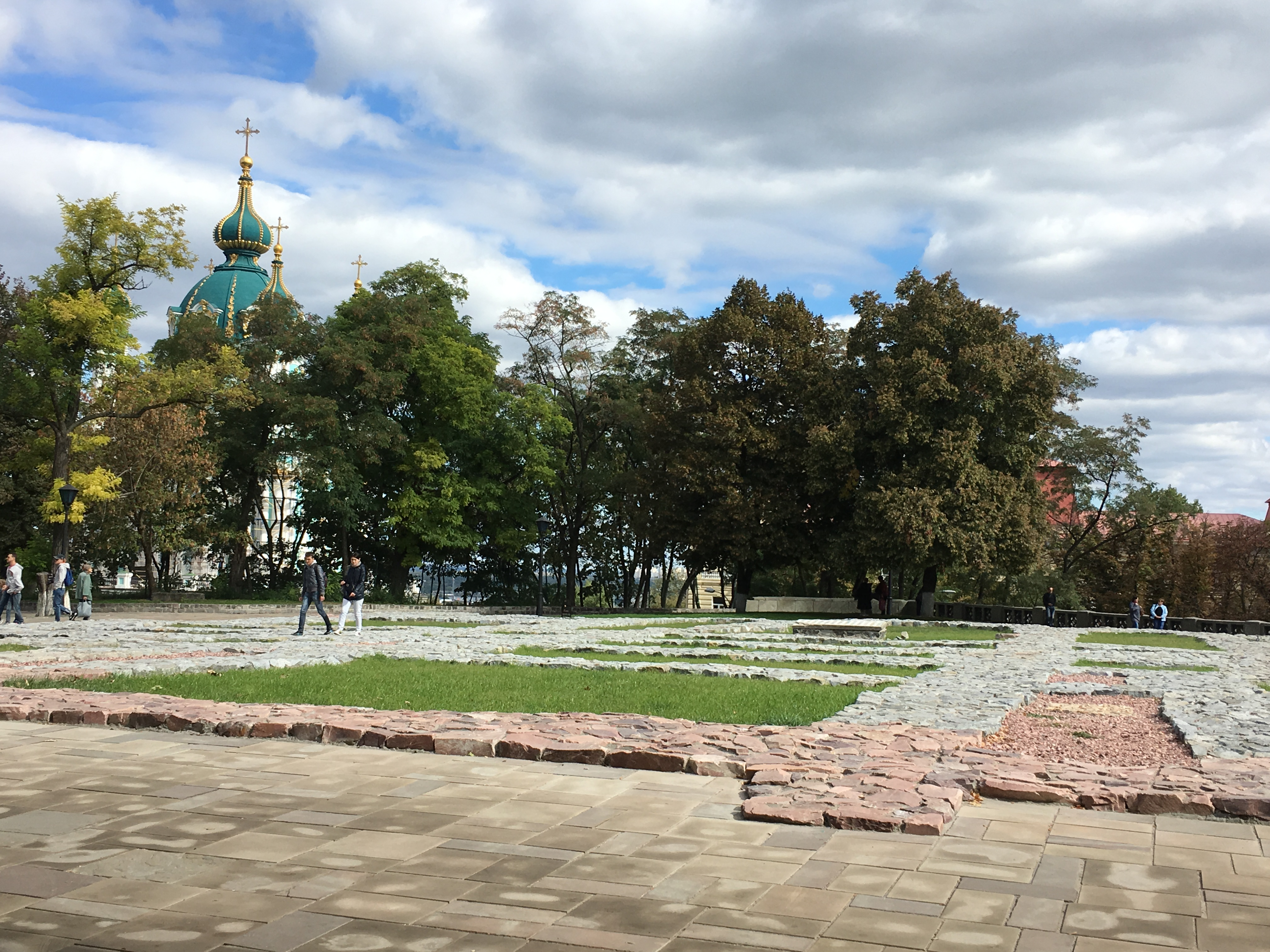
Restoration of tracing of the Desyatynna Church foundations

The project of the restoration of tracing of the Desyatynna Church foundations (the 1st stone Church of the Kyivan Rus) was initiated by the NGO and implemented with the support of the Ministry of Culture of Ukraine, the Institute of Archaeology of Ukraine, the National Museum of the History of Ukraine, the Kyiv City State Administration and other institutions in 2015. More than $3,000 donations were raised within the project implementation.

=== Restoration of the territory of the National Museum of the History of Ukraine ===
In 2016, the NGO Initiative for St. Andrew's Passage together with the sponsor Vyacheslav Moskalevsky implemented a project on the restoration of the National Museum of the History of Ukraine territory. The project was realized as a part of the social project “Zrobymo razom!” and was supported by Kyiv Mayor Vitaly Klichko and the Ministry of Culture of Ukraine.

The aim of the project is the revival of the historic center of Kyiv as a public area that is open to Kyiv inhabitants and visitors.

To achieve its goals and objectives, the NGO actively cooperates with the Ministry of Culture of Ukraine, the Kyiv City and Kyiv District authorities, the Mayor of Kyiv, other cultural and official institutions, charity foundations and non-governmental organizations:

- National Sanctuary "Sophia of Kyiv"
- National Museum of the History of Ukraine
- Ukrainian Association of historical and cultural monuments
- Charity fund “Kyiv landscape Initiative”
- Project “Ni koruptsii”
- NGO “Four Queens”
- NGO “Glasnist”
- Social project “Zrobymo razom”
- Civil initiative “Save old Kyiv”
- Europa Nostra
- Freedom House

The NGO representatives are the members of the Advisory and Consultative Boards of different governmental institutions — the Ministry of Culture, Department of cultural heritage protection of the Kyiv City State Administration; they represent public interests (in some cases) in the Kyiv City Council. The member of the board of the NGO Ihor Lutsenko is a Deputy of the Verkhovna Rada of Ukraine (Ukrainian Parliament).

The co-founders of the NGO and its administrators are professional advocates, lawyers, interpreters, journalists and active public figures. Among its members are artists, sculptors, designers, writers, representatives of other creative professions.

== See also ==
- List of World Heritage Sites in Ukraine
