= Sophia of Kiev =

Sophia of Kiev or Sophia of Kyiv can refer to:

- National Reserve "Sophia of Kyiv"
- Saint Sophia Cathedral, Kyiv
- Queen Sophia of Kiev (c. 1405–1461)
