= Lach Gates =

- Лядські ворота (Ukrainian)
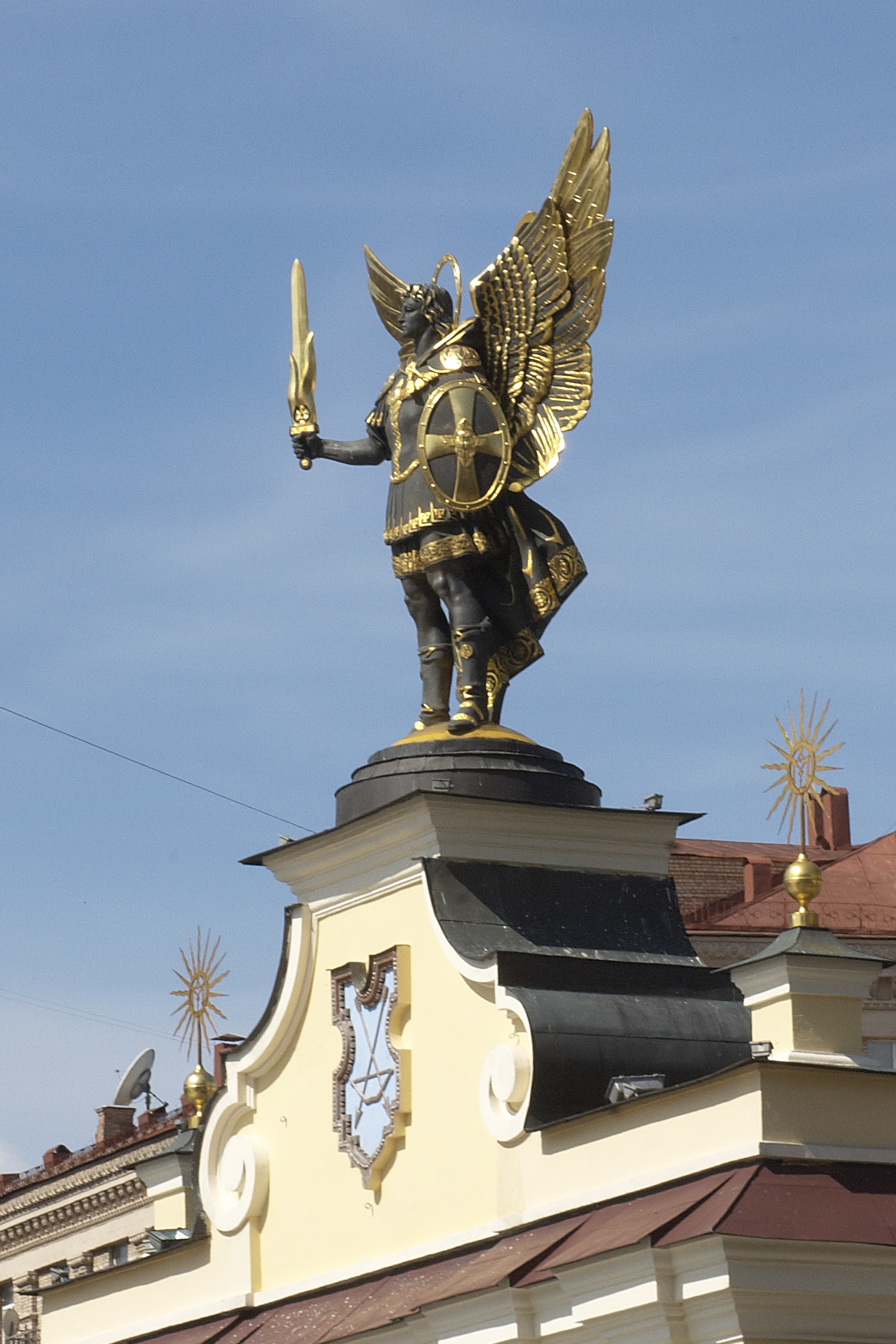
- Statue of Archangel Michael at the top of Lach Gates
- Interactive map of Lach Gates
- 50°27′03″N 30°31′22″E
- Type: Fortification
- Periods: Medieaval
- Location: Polish quarters (former)
- Region: Kyiv
- Part of: Old Kyiv city gates

History
- Built: 1037
- Abandoned: 1240 (burnt by Batu Khan invaders)
- Event: Siege of Kiev (1240)

Site notes
- Material: Wooden
- Public access: Open

Immovable Monument of National Significance of Ukraine
- Official name: Фундаменти Лядських воріт (Foundations of Lach Gates)
- Type: Archaeology
- Reference no.: 260032-Н

The Lach Gates (Ukrainian: Лядські ворота, romanized: Liadski vorota, a.k.a. the Lechitic Gates) at Independence Square in Kyiv is a monument built in 2001 to commemorate one of the Medieval Kyiv city gates. At the top is a sculpture of Archangel Michael which is the city's symbol.

The gates were located in the former city's Polish quarter on the southeast side of Kyiv. According to Primary Chronicle, in 1240 the Lach Gates became the main fortification where Batu Khan concentrated his assault during the 1240 siege of Kyiv.

Lach gates were one of three known gates of Medieval Kyiv (Old Kyiv), the others being the Golden Gate and the Jewish (Lviv) Gates.

== History ==
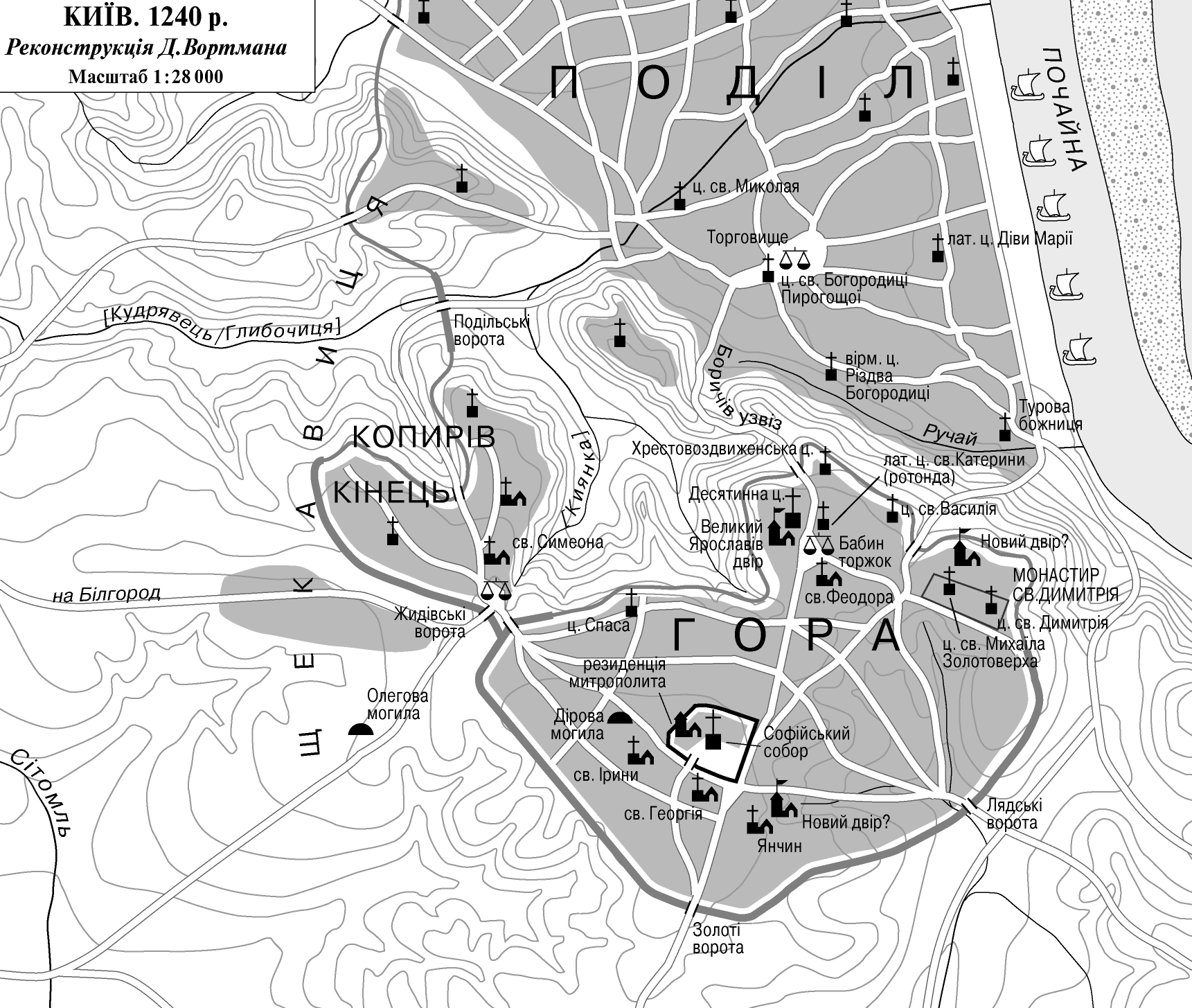
Lach Gates at the city walls among Golden and Jewish gates. Kyiv. 1240. Reconstruction of D.Vortman

The first mention of the gates is traced to 1151 during the confrontation between princes of Kyiv (Iziaslav II) and Suzdal (George the Long-Armed).

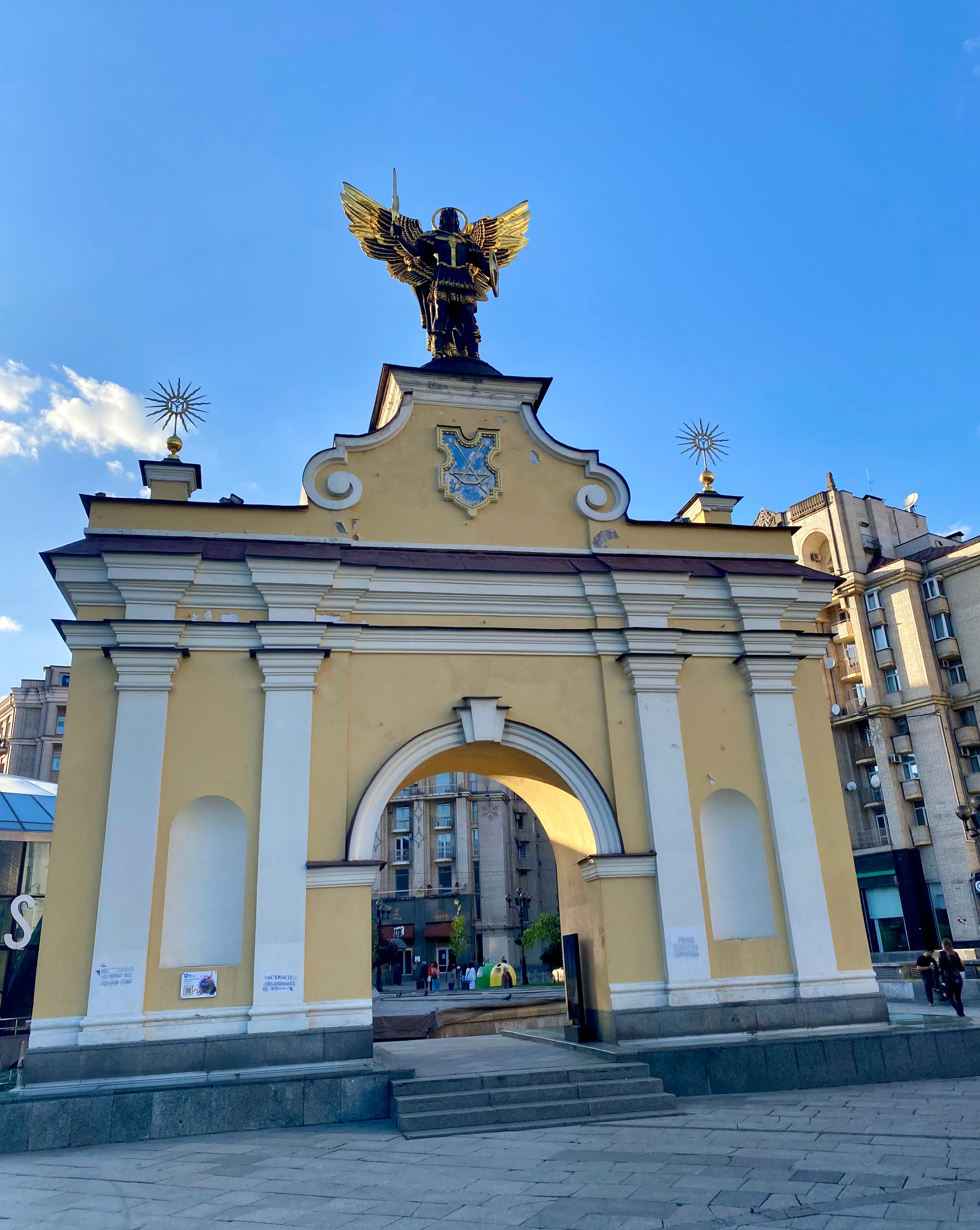

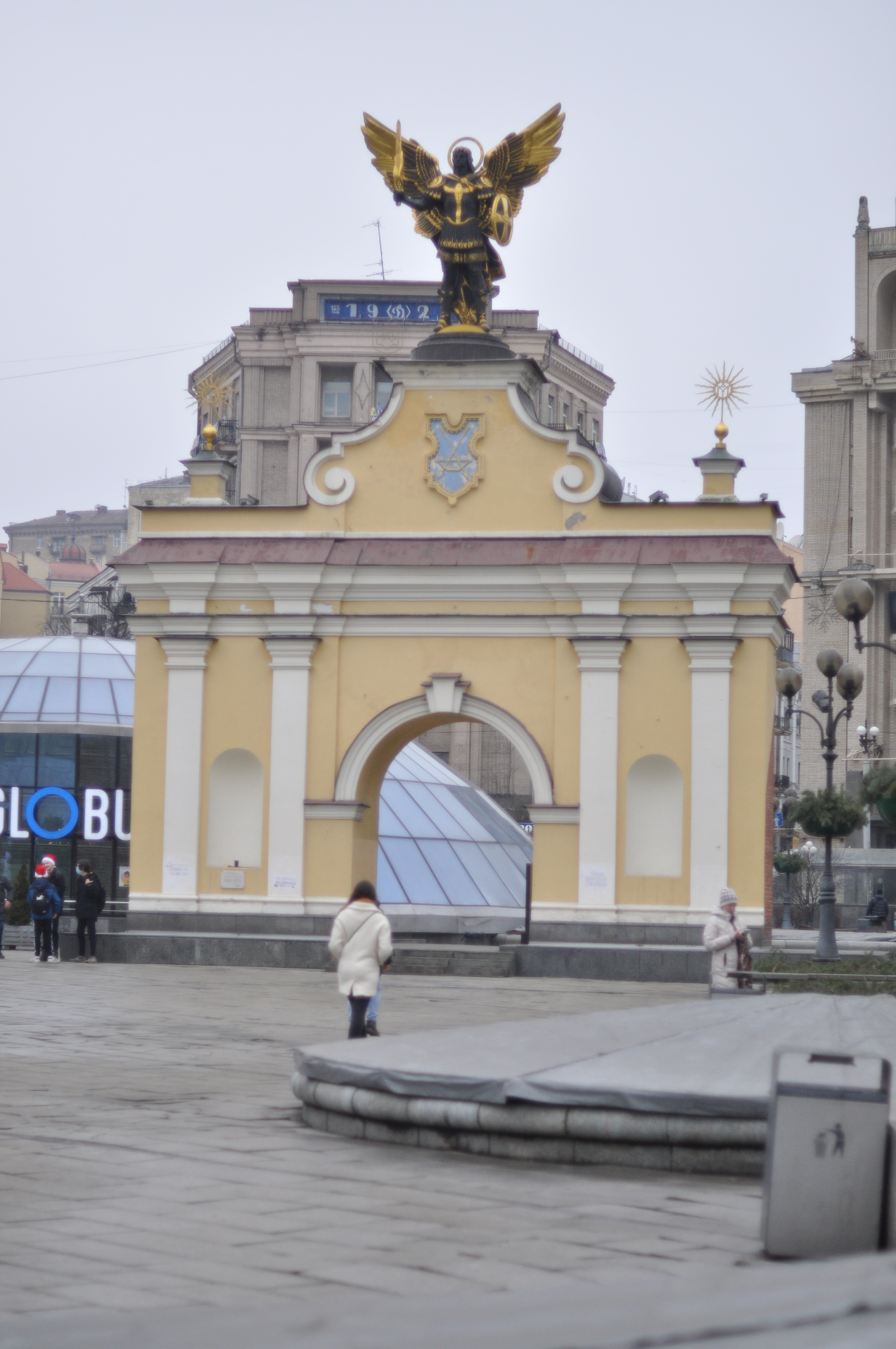

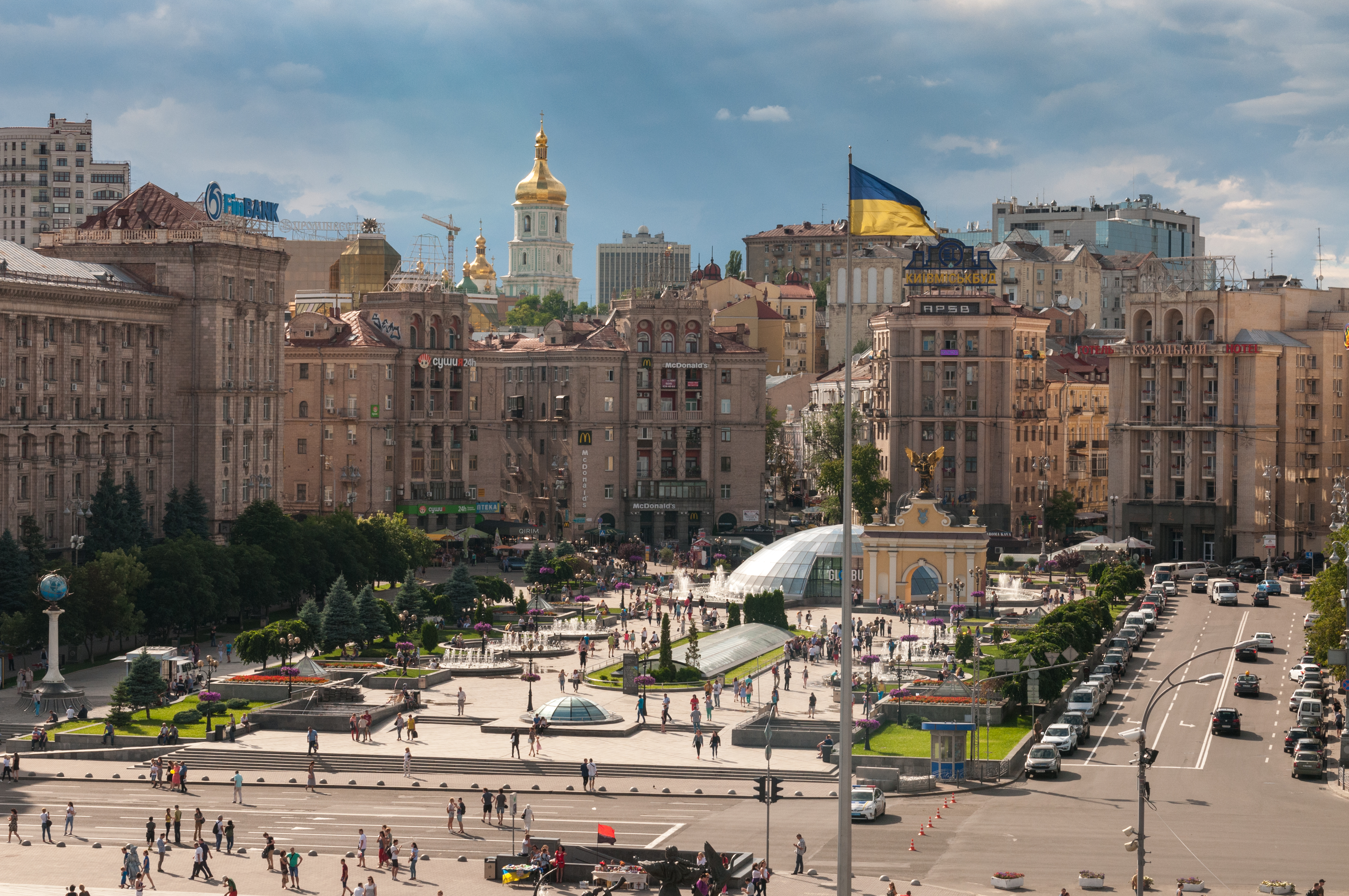
