= Golden Gate, Kyiv =

Historic landmark in Kyiv, Ukraine

Coordinates: 50°26′56″N 30°30′48″E

Golden Gate
- Золоті ворота
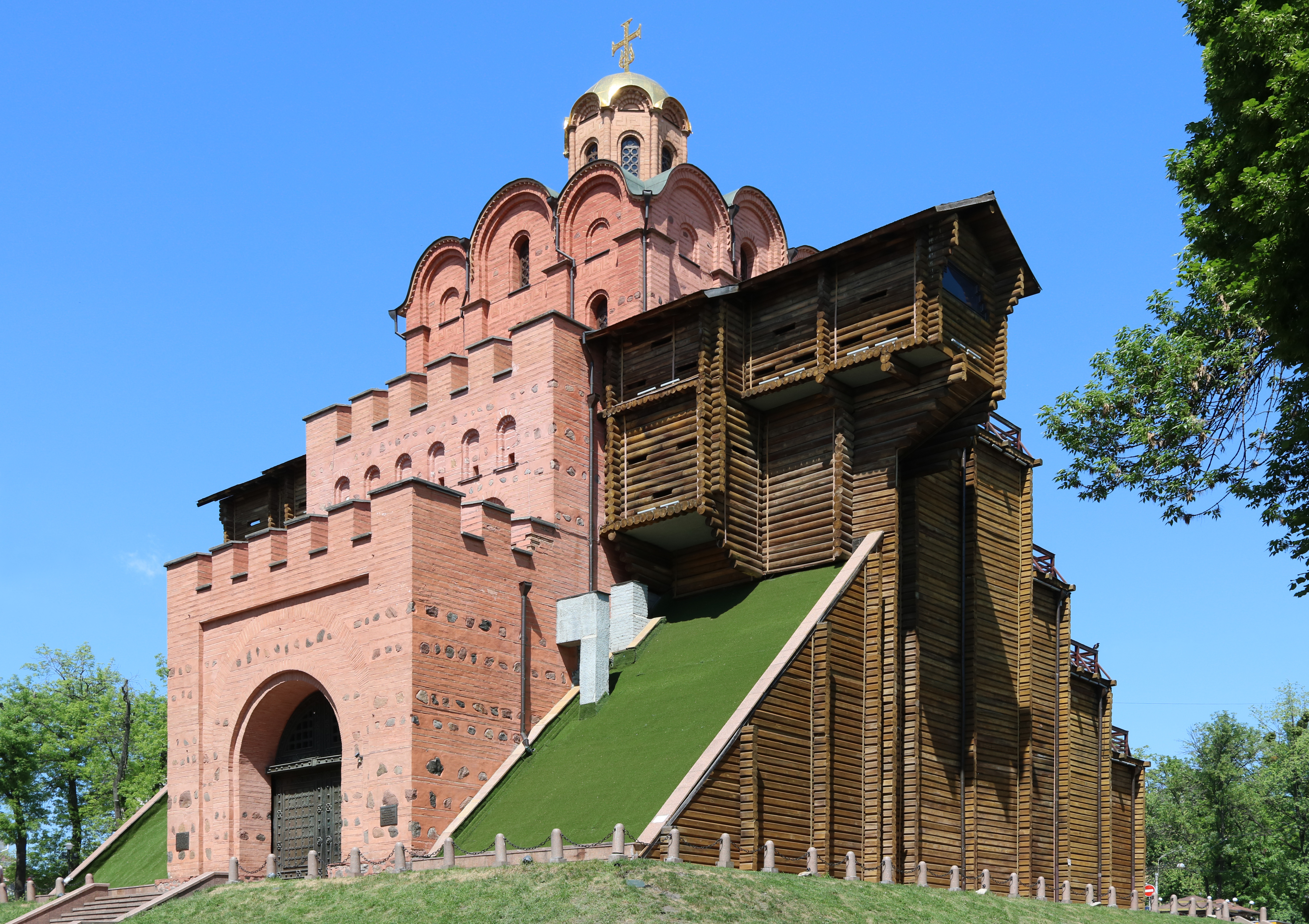
- 1982 reconstruction of the Golden Gate, pictured in 2018 after major renovations

General information
- Status: Used as a museum
- Type: Fortifications
- Location: Volodymyrska St, 40А, Kyiv, Ukraine
- Current tenants: Golden Gate Museum
- Construction started: 1017
- Completed: 1024
- Owner: National Reserve "Sophia of Kyiv"

Dimensions
- Other dimensions: 10.5 m (34 ft) wide x 32 m (105 ft) high

Immovable Monument of National Significance of Ukraine
- Official name: Золоті Ворота (Руїни Золотих Воріт) (Golden Gate (Ruins of the Golden Gate))
- Type: Architecture, History
- Reference no.: 260073-Н

The Golden Gate of Kyiv (Ukrainian: Золоті ворота, romanized: Zoloti vorota, IPA: [zoloˈt⁽ʲ⁾i woˈrɔtɐ]) was the main gate in the 11th century fortifications of Kyiv, the capital of the Kievan Rus'. It was likely named in imitation of the Golden Gate of Constantinople. The structure was dismantled in the Middle Ages, leaving few vestiges of its existence.

In 1982, it was rebuilt completely by the Soviet authorities, though no images of the original gates have survived. The decision has been intensely controversial because there were many competing reconstructions of what the original gate might have looked like.

The rebuilt structure on the corner of Volodymyrska Street and Yaroslaviv Val Street contains a branch of the National Reserve "Sophia of Kyiv" museum. The name Zoloti Vorota is also used for a nearby theater and the Zoloti Vorota station of the Kyiv Metro.

== History ==
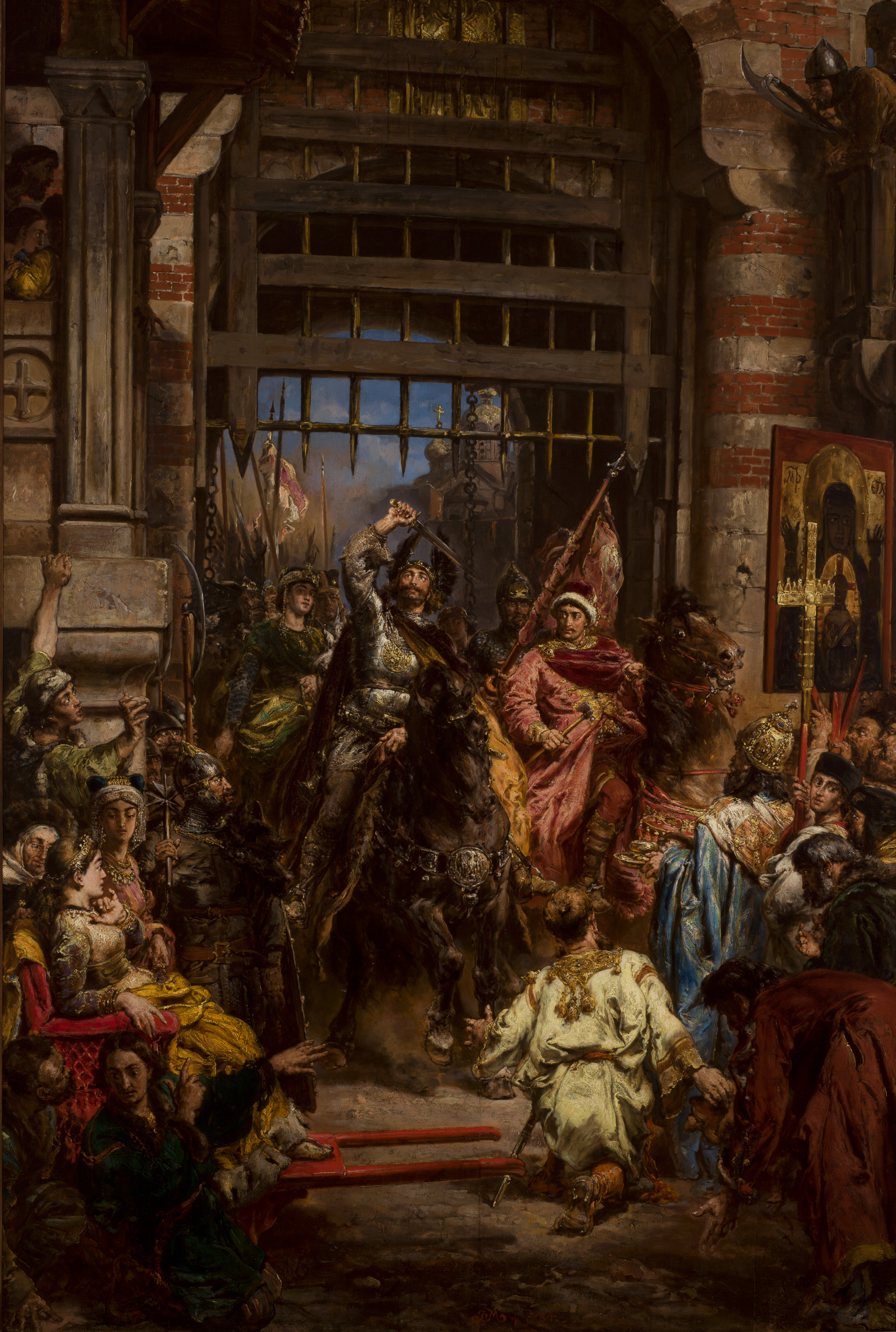
Bolesław I of Poland and Sviatopolk the Accursed at Kyiv, in a legendary moment of hitting the Golden Gate with the Szczerbiec sword. Painting by Jan Matejko

Modern history accepts this gateway as one of three constructed by Yaroslav the Wise. The golden gates were built in 1017–1024 (6545 by the Byzantine calendar) at about the same time the Saint Sophia Cathedral was erected. Mentions of an older construction, such as the one presented on a painting by Jan Matejko of king Bolesław I of Poland striking the Golden Gate with his sword during the intervention in the Kyivan succession crisis in 1018, are now regarded as a legend. Originally named simply the Southern Gate, it was one of the three main entrances to the walled city, along with the Ladski and Zhydivski (Polish and Jewish) Gates. The last two have not survived. The stone fortifications stretched for only 3.5 km. The fortification of the Old Kyiv (Upper City) stretched from the Southern Gates down to what is now Independence Square and where the Lechitic Gate was located. From there, the moat followed what is now Kostyol Street, skirting St. Michael's Monastery and continuing along today's Zhytomyr Street toward the Jewish Gates (at Lviv Square). From there, the fortification stretched from what is now Yaroslaviv Val ("Yaroslav's Rampart") Street back to the Southern Gate.

Remnants of the old Golden Gate in the 1970s, prior to its reconstruction.

Later, the Southern Gate became known as the Great Gate of Kyiv. After the Blahovist Church (Church of the Annunciation) was built next to the gate, its golden domes became a prominent landmark easily visible from outside the city. Since then, the gateway has been referred to as the Golden Gate of Kyiv. The gate's passageway was about 12 metres (40 ft) high and 6 metres (20 ft) wide. For almost half a millennium, it served as the city's Triumphal Arch, a prominent symbol of Kyiv. Reputedly, it was modeled on the Golden Gate of Constantinople. Later, a similar name was given to the gates of Vladimir city where one of the Monomakh's descendants, Andrei I Bogolyubsky, established his own state, the Grand Duchy of Vladimir. In 1240, the gate was partially destroyed by Batu Khan's Golden Horde. It remained as a gate to the city (often used for ceremonies) through the eighteenth century, although it gradually fell into ruins.

In 1832, Metropolitan Eugenius had the ruins excavated and an initial survey for their conservation was undertaken. Further works in the 1970s added an adjacent pavilion, housing a museum of the gate. In the museum, visitors can learn about the history of construction of the Golden gate as well as ancient Kyiv.

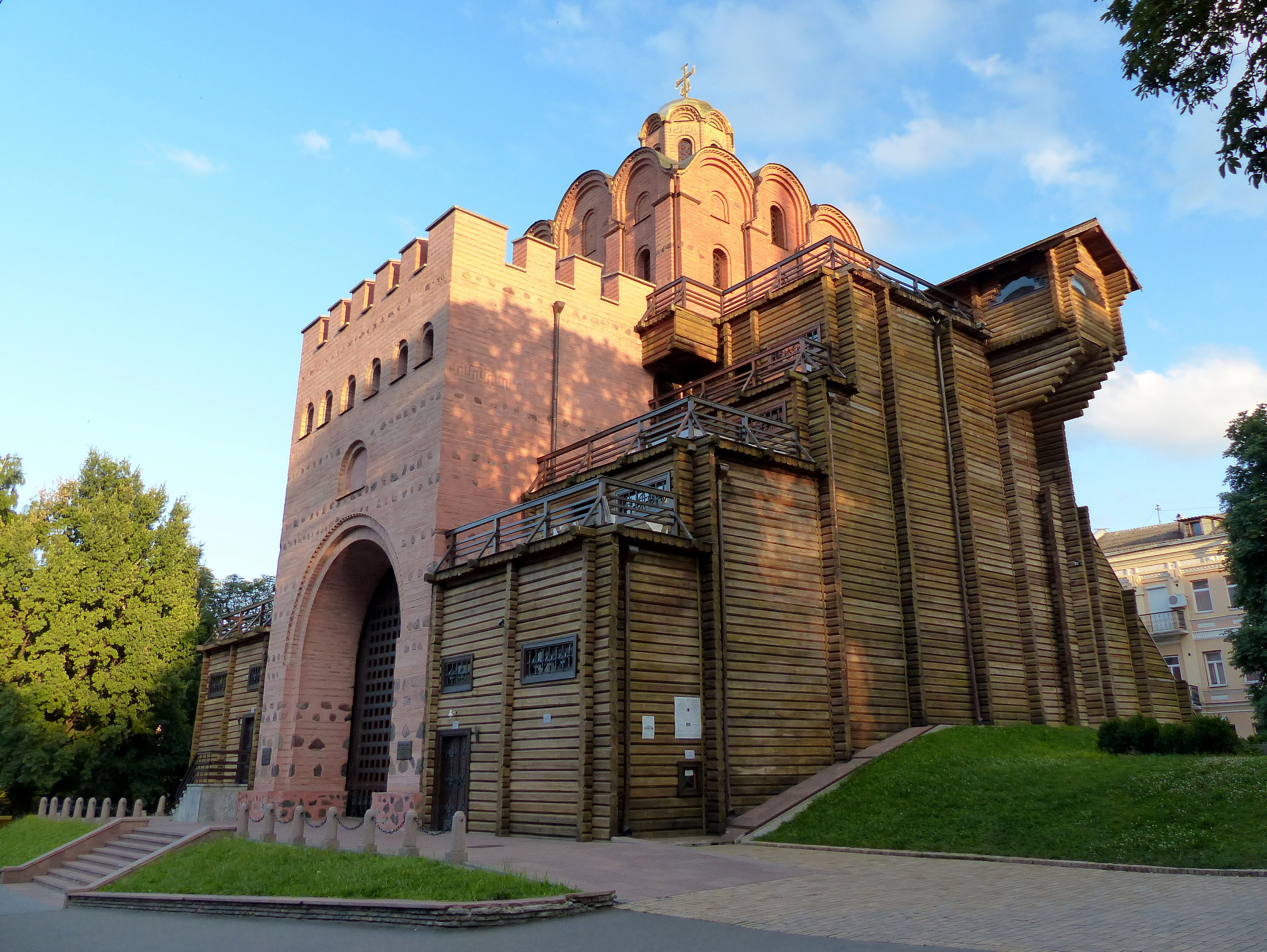
The view of the gate from the "city side"

In 1982, the gate was completely reconstructed for the 1500th anniversary of Kyiv, though this was challenged. Some art historians called for this reconstruction to be demolished and for the ruins of the original gate to be exposed to public view.

In 1989, with the expansion of the Kyiv Metro, Zoloti Vorota station was opened nearby to the landmark. Its architectural assembly is based on the internal decorations of ancient Ruthenian churches.

In 1997, the monument to Yaroslav the Wise was unveiled near the west end face of the Golden Gate. It is an enlarged bronze copy of an experimental figurine by Kavaleridze.

== Description ==
The original remnants of the Golden Gate comprise two wall segments, which are 24 m (79 ft) and 13 m (43 ft) in length, respectively. They are made of a mixture of Roman brick and stone.

The reconstruction of the monument reproduces the segments of the shaft adjoining to the gate. On the outside they have suspended slopes. At the top of the shaft there are wooden bunks. On the ends conventionally shown internal structures. From the city side on the façade there are warehouses. Inside the restored shaft segments there is an exposition of the Museum of the Golden Gate and the stairs leading to the balcony, from which a magnificent panorama of the city is visible. The medieval sections are protected as an architectural and historic monument of national significance, while the reconstructed exterior sections are not listed as a cultural heritage site.

=== Church above the passage ===
In addition to mentioning the construction of the church above the passage of the Golden Gate in the chronicle, it is also mentioned in Metropolitan Ilarion's "Word of Law and Grace" of the Golden Gate.

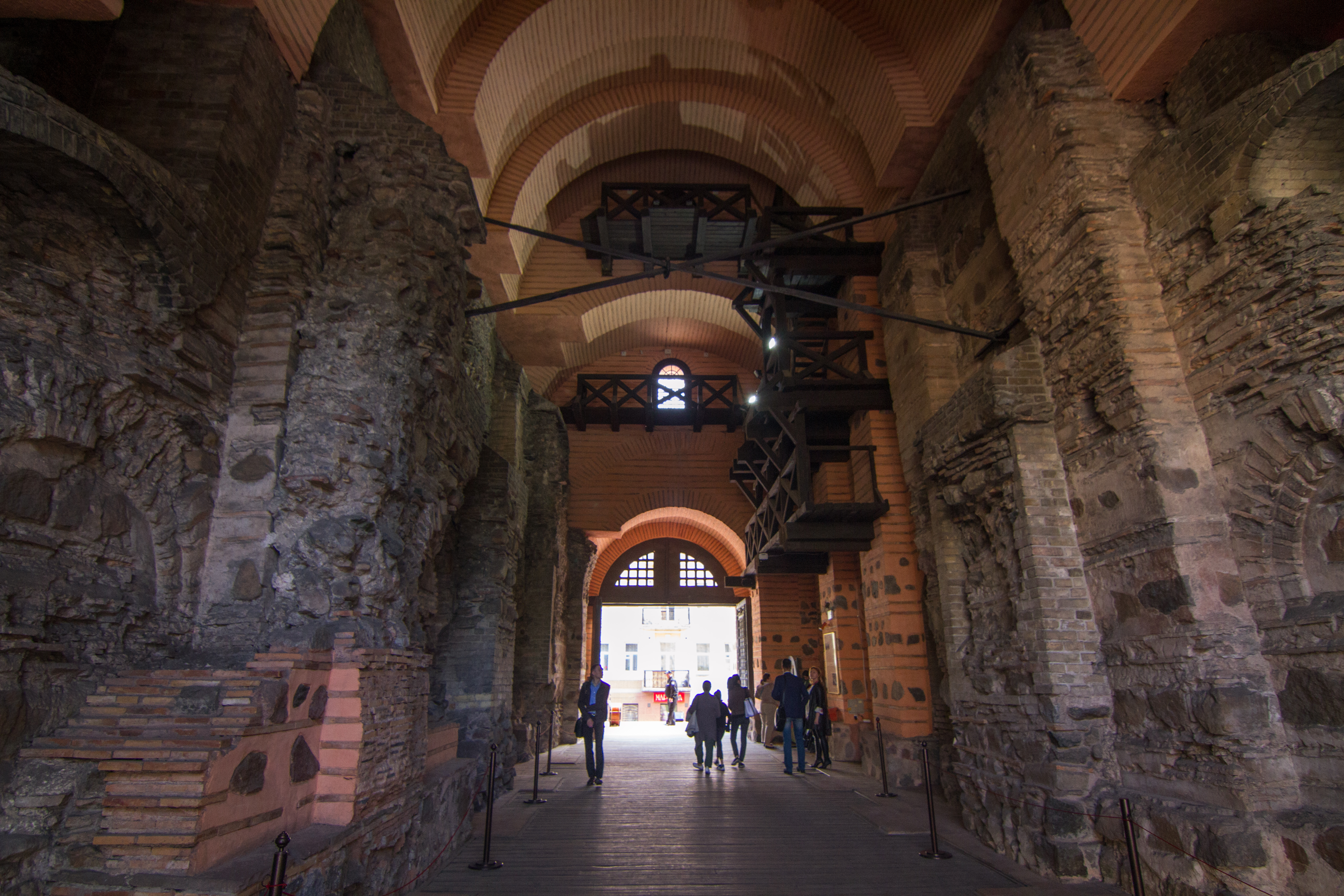
Interior of Golden Gate

Gate Church had to serve "the heavenly protection of the city", but was also a regular church – people arrived to pray there.

The bell chapel is reproduced in the form of a three-nave four-pillar single-dome temple. In the architectural decoration of the façades used ornaments from the brick, typical for the ancient buildings of that period. The floor of the church is decorated with a mosaic, the picture of which is based on the ancient floor design of Saint Sophia Cathedral in Kyiv.

=== Square ===
The Square around the Golden Gate was created in the second half of the 19th century. A botanical natural monument was created by the decision of the Kyiv executive committee No. 363 20 March 1972.

== See also ==
- Golden Gates in Vladimir, the only extant example of a gateway of medieval Rus'
- Lach Gates
- Pictures at an Exhibition, by composer Modest Mussorgsky, is a musical suite, one part of which was inspired by Viktor Hartmann's project for another gate in Kyiv.
