= St. Cyril's Monastery, Kyiv =

Eastern Orthodox monastery in Ukraine

St. Cyril's Monastery
- Ukrainian: Кирилівський монастир
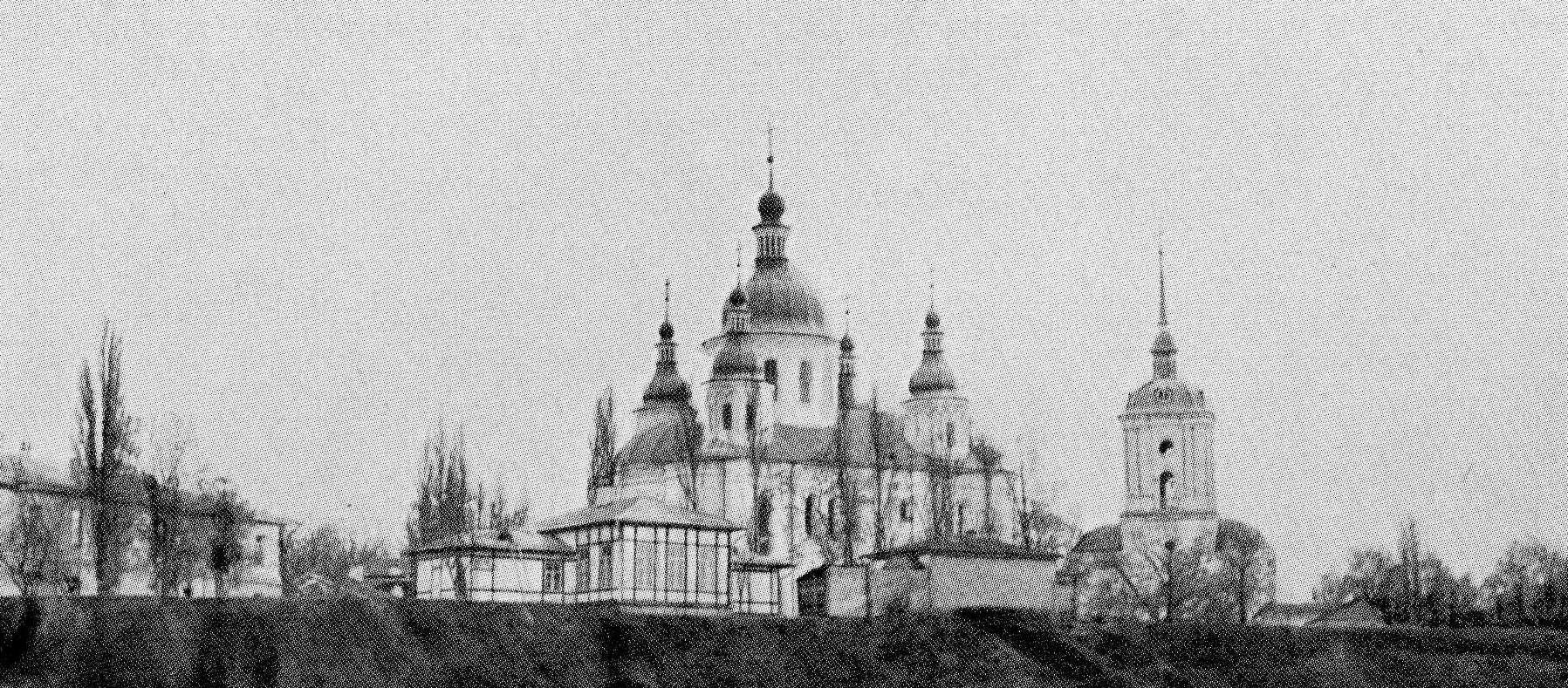
- A panorama of St. Cyril's Monastery before the destruction of its belfry

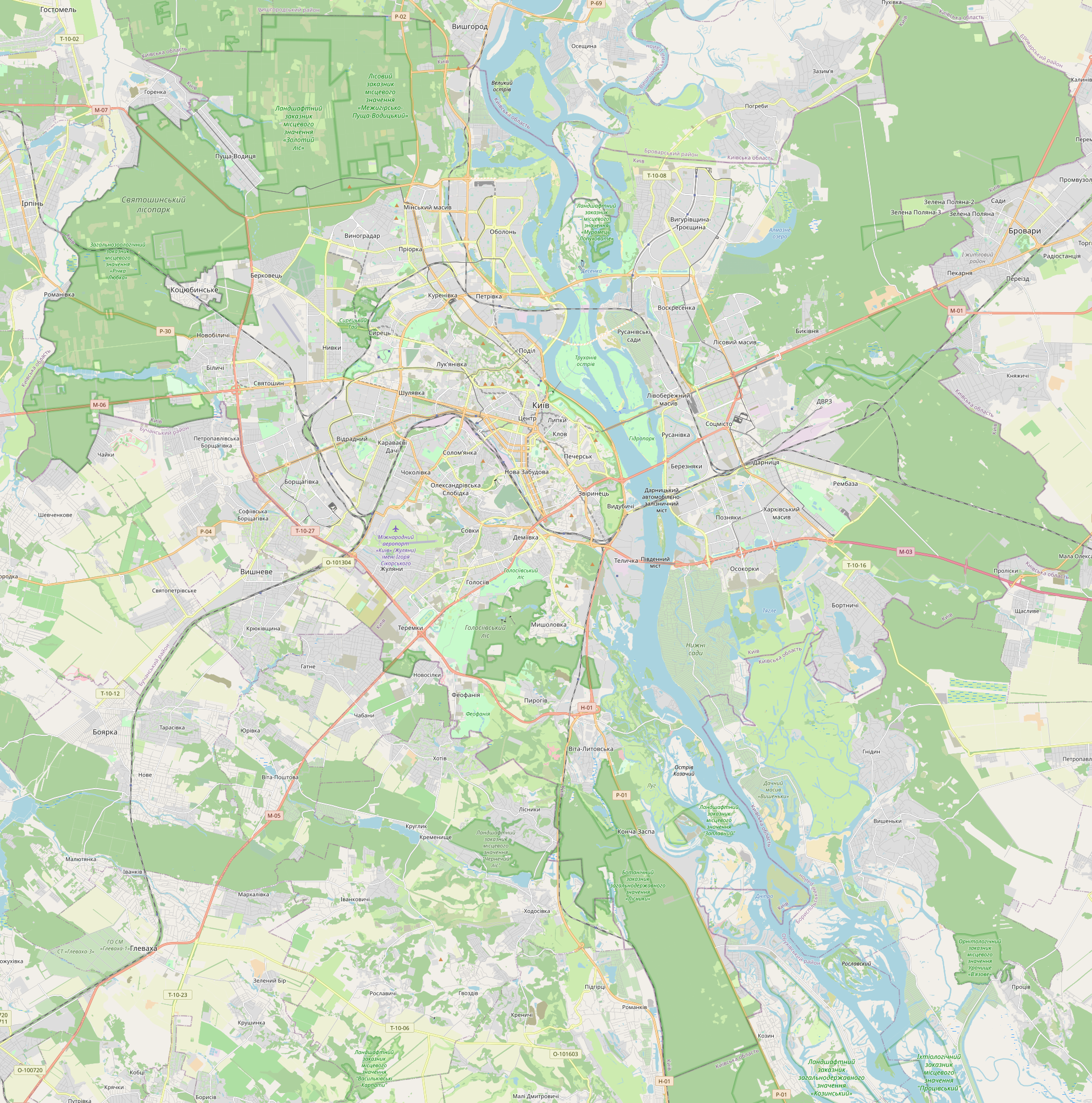
- Location within Ukraine Kyiv Location within Kyiv Oblast Location within Ukraine

General information
- Location: Kyiv, Ukraine, Ukraine
- Coordinates: 50.483091°N 30.471772°E
- Owner: Ukrainian Orthodox Church (Moscow Patriarchate)

Immovable Monument of National Significance of Ukraine
- Official name: Кирилівська церква (St. Cyril's Church)
- Type: History, Monumental Art, Architecture
- Reference no.: 260072-Н

Immovable Monument of National Significance of Ukraine
- Official name: Археологічний комплекс Кирилівського монастиря (Archaeological complex of St. Cyril's Monastery)
- Type: Archaeology
- Reference no.: 260104

The St. Cyril's Monastery (Ukrainian: Кирилівський монастир, romanized: Kyrylivskyi monastyr) is a medieval monastery in Kyiv, the capital of Ukraine. The monastery contains the famous St. Cyril's Church, an important specimen of Kievan Rus' architecture of the 12th century, and combines elements of the 17th and 19th centuries. However, being largely Ukrainian Baroque on the outside, the church retains its original Kievan Rus' interior.

== History ==
St. Cyril's Monastery was founded in 1140 by Vsevolod Olgovich, the Kniaz' (prince) of Chernigov, in the Dorohozhychi neighbourhood of Kyiv and named after his heavenly protector, Cyril of Alexandria. In the second half of the 12th century, Princess Maria, Vsevolod's widow, built the stone church of St. Cyril, which served as an ancestral burial place of the Olgovichi family.

The monastery suffered a severe fire in 1734, and was reconstructed by the Ukrainian architect Ivan Hryhorovych-Barskyi during 1750–1760. His work also included the addition of masonry walls enclosing the monastery's courtyard, a picturesque corner tower and gate, and other monastic buildings.

In 1787, St. Cyril's Monastery was closed by the Tsarist Government and its living quarters were converted into a hospital (St. Cyril's Hospital) and were later transformed into an insane asylum, which lasted until the mid-late 20th century in Soviet Ukraine.

On May 8, 1929, the Council of Commisars of the Ukrainian SSR proclaimed St. Cyril's Monastery as a monument of historic significance and ordered that a "preservation district" be established. However, at the same time, the monastery's church was closed to worship and it was prepared for transformation into a museum. The monastery's belfry was to hold a museum dedicated to Ivan Hryhorovych-Barskyi. Like the many other numerous state protection districts throughout the Ukrainian SSR, the St. Cyril's complex was owned by the People's Commisariat of Education.

Pursuant to legislation passed by the Verkhovna Rada in June 1936, the Commissariat of Education had to grant permission for the dismantlement of St. Cyril's Monastic structures. According to the former curator of the St. Cyril State Preservation District, the monastic walls, gates, one corner tower, and the belfry were dismantled for their brick material in 1937.

St. Cyril's Church, including the medieval interior frescoes and the 1880s murals by the famous Russian painter Mikhail Vrubel, were fortunately preserved. The remaining constructions of the complex, the rest of the monastic walls, one corner tower (see picture), and two buildings constructed by Barskyi were also preserved. Of the monastery's cemetery, only two 18th-century graves remained.

In 1965, the Church became a branch of the National Sanctuary "Sophia of Kyiv", allowing for major restorations as well as historical documentation to begin. Since the late 1990s, the Ukrainian Orthodox Church has been allowed to conduct regular services inside the structure. On June 14, 2011, the parish was transformed into St. Cyril's Monastery.

== Buildings ==
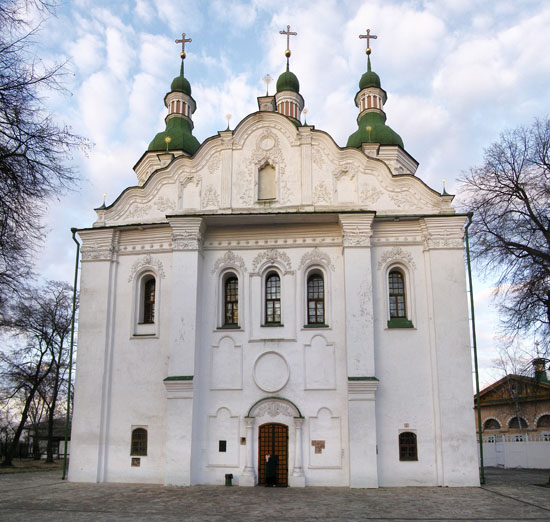
The baroque-influenced portal of St. Cyril's Church after the post-fire reconstruction

=== St. Cyril's Church ===
St. Cyril's Church (Ukrainian: Кирилівська церква, translit. Kyrylivs’ka tserkva) is a rectangular-shaped structure with three apses jutting out on the eastern side. The church's dome and vaults rest upon six cruciform piers. A staircase built into the north wall leads up to the gallery in the western section. On this side there is also a chapel — a rare feature of ancient Kievan Rus churches. The baptistery and the niches of the narthex are other uncommon features. Originally, each of the vaults was roofed with plates of sheet steel.

Throughout the centuries, the church suffered more than once from devastating enemy raids and a devastating fire in 1734. The church was restored and reconstructed many times, altering its original appearance. As St. Cyril's Church is located within the contemporary limits of Kyiv, the church is the only medieval church structure that survived until the 20th century without any major additions. The current exterior of the church was shaped during restoration works carried out during 1750–1760, by the Ukrainian architect Ivan Hryhorovych-Barskyi. Although containing elements of Ukrainian Baroque on the exterior, the interior remains largely unchanged from its original style.

=== Belfry ===
Of the monastic buildings Ivan Hryhorovych-Barskyi constructed within the monastery, his most important construction was a free standing belfry, built in 1760. The belfry combined the idea of a tall campanile with a gate on the ground level and a chapel on the belfry's second tier. The two lower levels of the belfry had some elements of a Ukrainian tripartite church, consisting with the belltower placed over the central part of the nave. This architectural combination in a belfry with two apse-like lower elements on each side. The original roof above the belfry's chapel was a stepped-hipped roof, which was popular at the time. After the fire of 1849, the roofs over the chapel and the cupola were modified from the original. After the Ukrainian SSR's decision on the demolition of the belfry in 1936, the belfry was destroyed a year later, to be used as bricks in construction projects.
