= National Reserve "Sophia of Kyiv" =

Ukrainian historic sites

Coordinates: 50.4500°N 30.5167°E

The National Reserve "Sophia of Kyiv" (Ukrainian: Національний заповідник «Софія Київська», romanized: Natsionalnyi zapovidnyk «Sofiia Kyivska») is a historic preserve that contains a complex of museums in Kyiv and Sudak and is responsible for maintenance and preservation of some of its most precious historic sites.

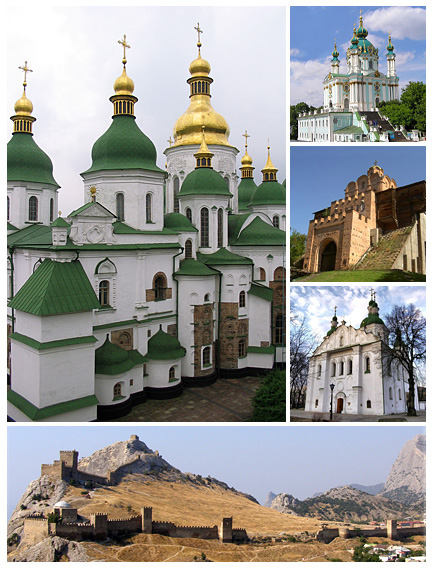
Clockwise from top left: Saint Sophia Cathedral, St. Andrew's Church, Golden Gate, St. Cyril's Church, and the Genoese fortress

== List of landmarks in the complex ==
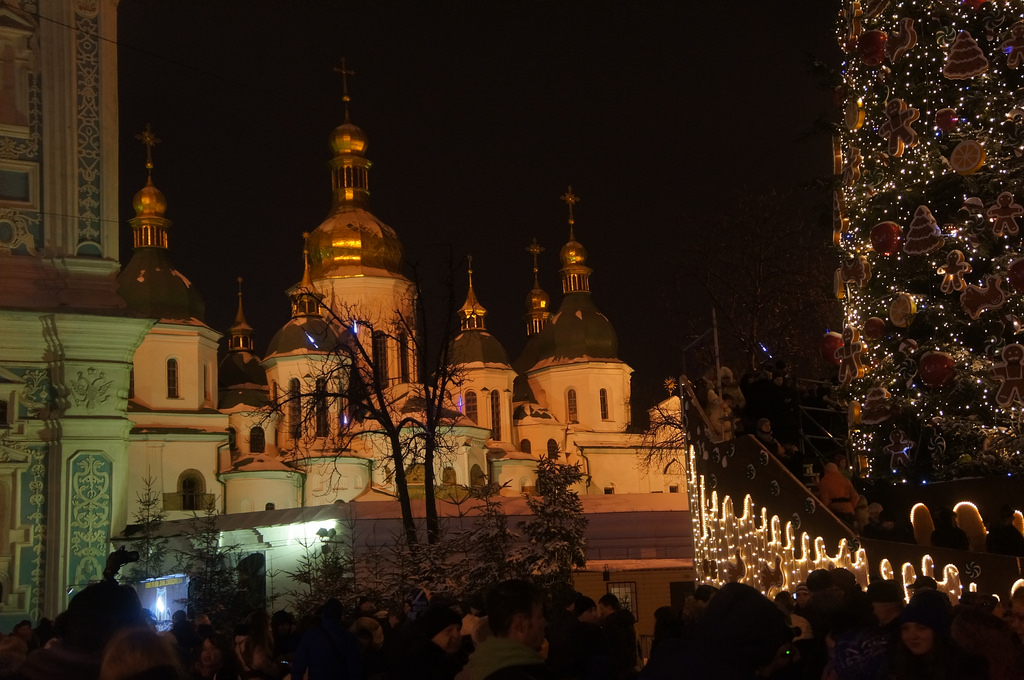
Saint Sophia Cathedral

=== Kyiv ===
- Complex of Saint Sophia Cathedral, prime landmark
- Golden Gate, part of Sophia of Kyiv since 1983
- St. Cyril's Monastery, created in 1929, was transferred to Sophia of Kyiv in 1965
- St Andrew's Church, part of All-Ukrainian Historic Site 1935, it was transferred to Sophia of Kyiv in 1939 and 1968

=== Crimea ===
- Sudak Fortress, created in 1371–1460, became a part of Sophia of Kyiv in 1958

== History ==
In 1934, by the order of the authorities of the Soviet Ukraine, the creation of the cultural reserve at the site of the Saint Sophia Cathedral likely saved one of the holiest sites in Eastern Europe from destruction during the Soviet-wide anti-religious campaign of the early 1930s. The preserve was established in place of the cathedral of the Ukrainian Autocephalous Orthodox Church that was dissolved in 1930. The museum's responsibilities were gradually expanded to other historic locations of Kyiv.

In 1994, the reserve was accorded its current status as being National.

Both St. Andrew and St. Cyril churches are acting. The first church belongs to the Ukrainian Autocephalous Orthodox Church, while the other belongs to the Ukrainian Orthodox Church (Moscow Patriarchate) and is part of the revived St. Cyril's Monastery.

== See also ==
- List of historic reserves in Ukraine
- List of UNESCO World Heritage Sites in Ukraine

== Sources ==
- Sophiakievska.org: official Sophia of Kyiv website —(in English)
- Kateryna Shchotkina, "An ordinary date of Sophia", Zerkalo Nedeli (The Mirror Weekly), October 16–22, 2006, in Russian, in Ukrainian.
