= Timeline of the Euromaidan =

The Ukrainian ribbon. Ribbons are common symbols of non-violent protest

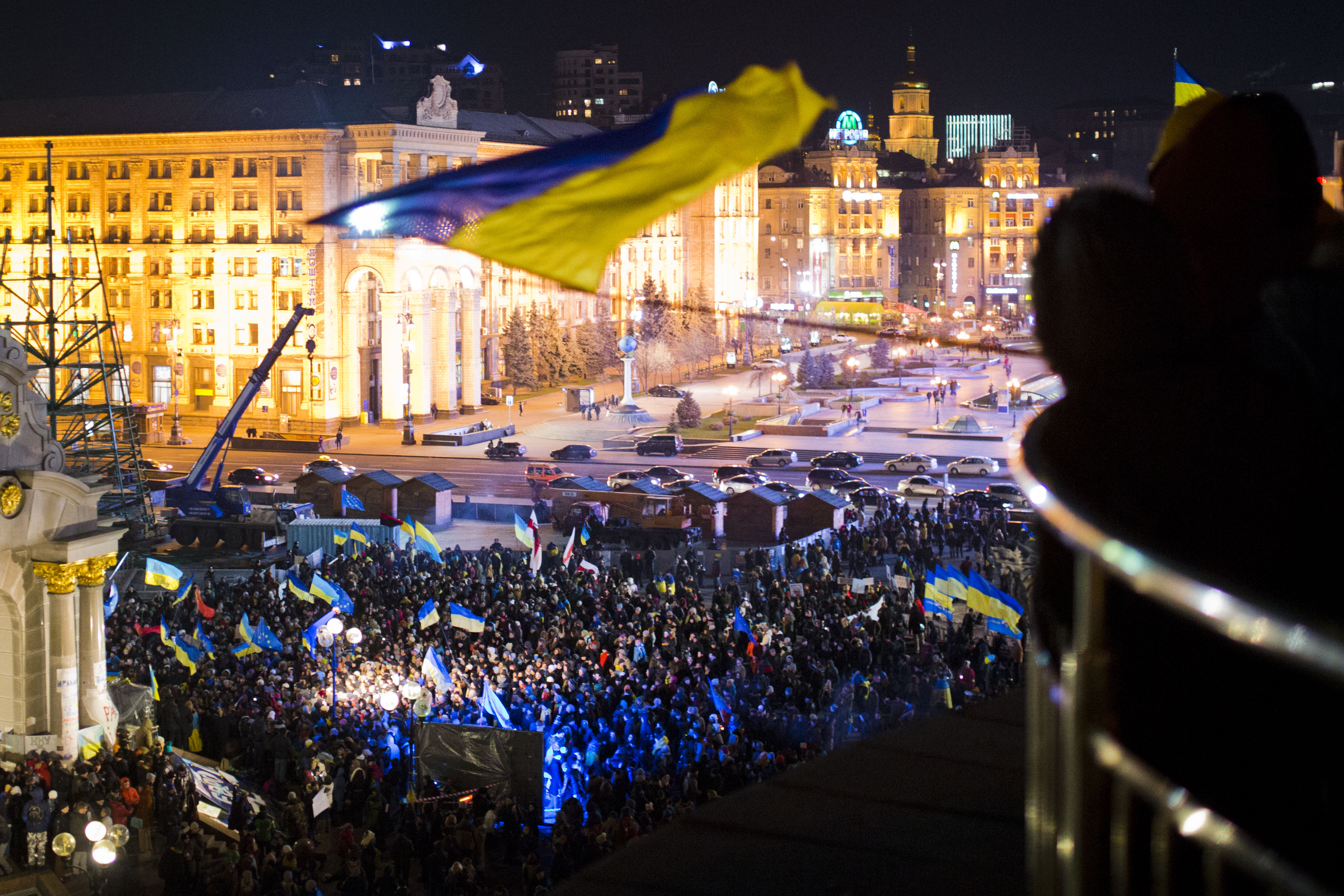
Pro-European Union rally in Kyiv, 27 November 2013

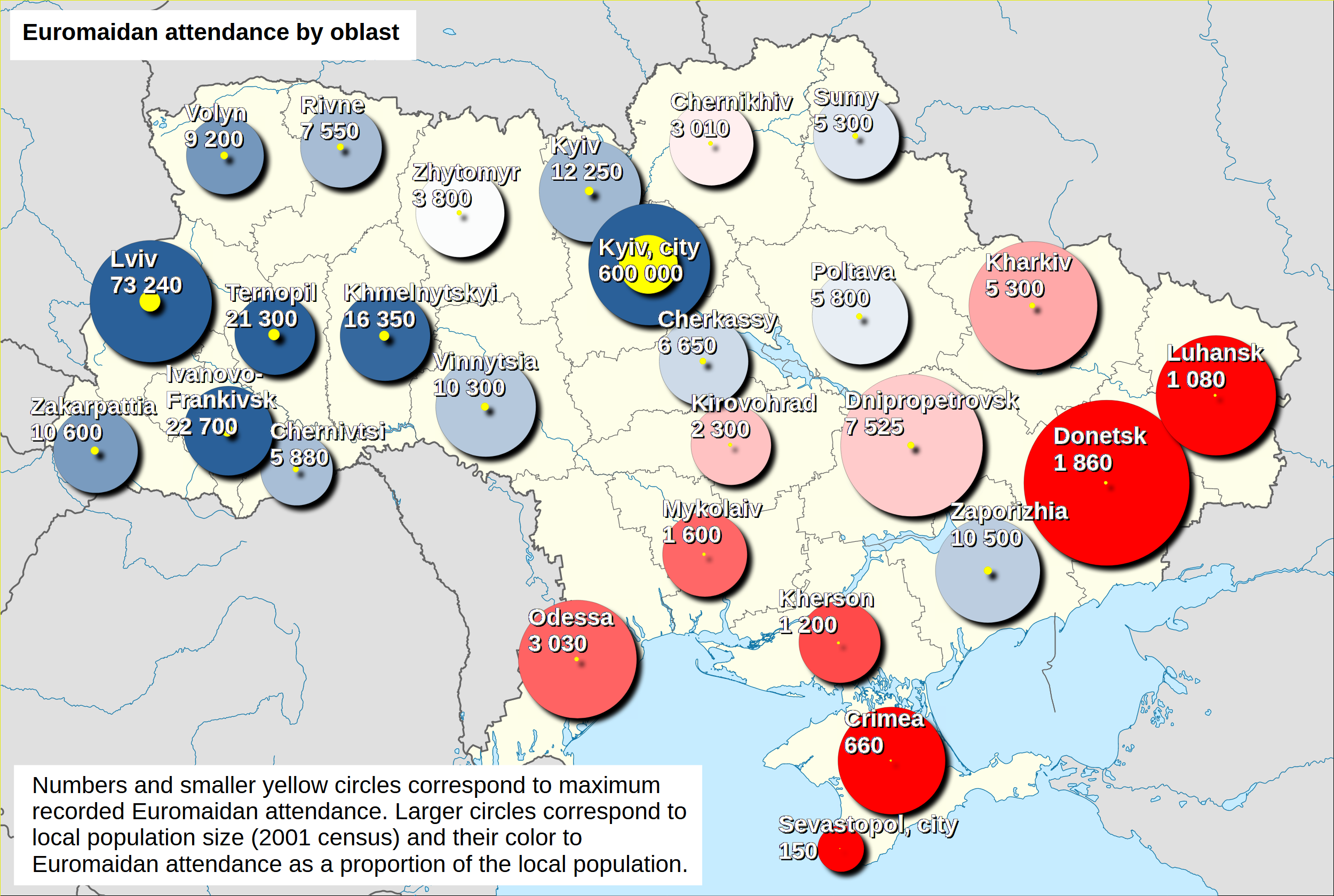
Map of Euromaidan attendance by oblast.

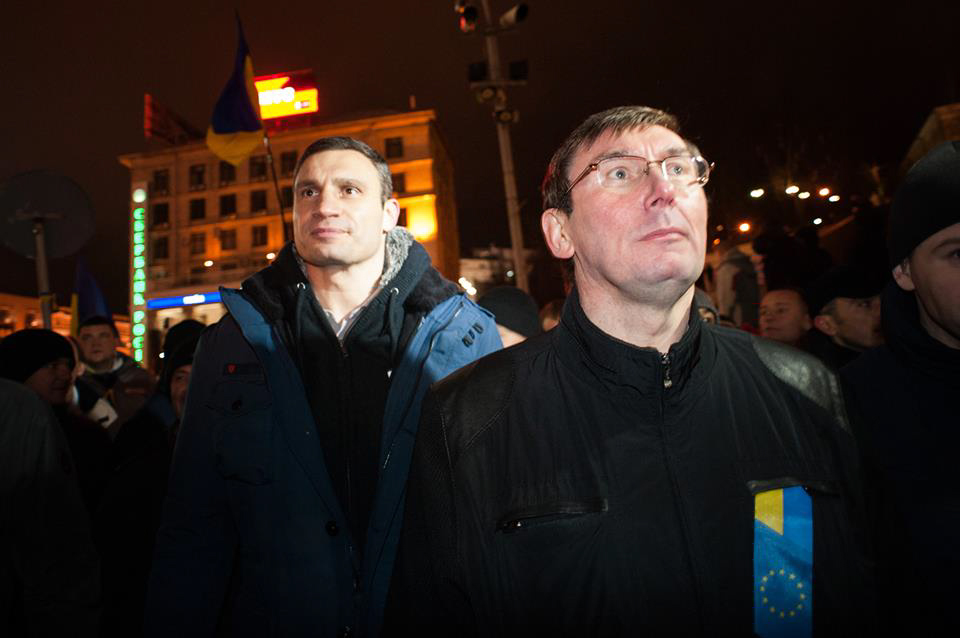
Opposition leaders Vitali Klitschko and Yuriy Lutsenko stand with demonstrators on European Square

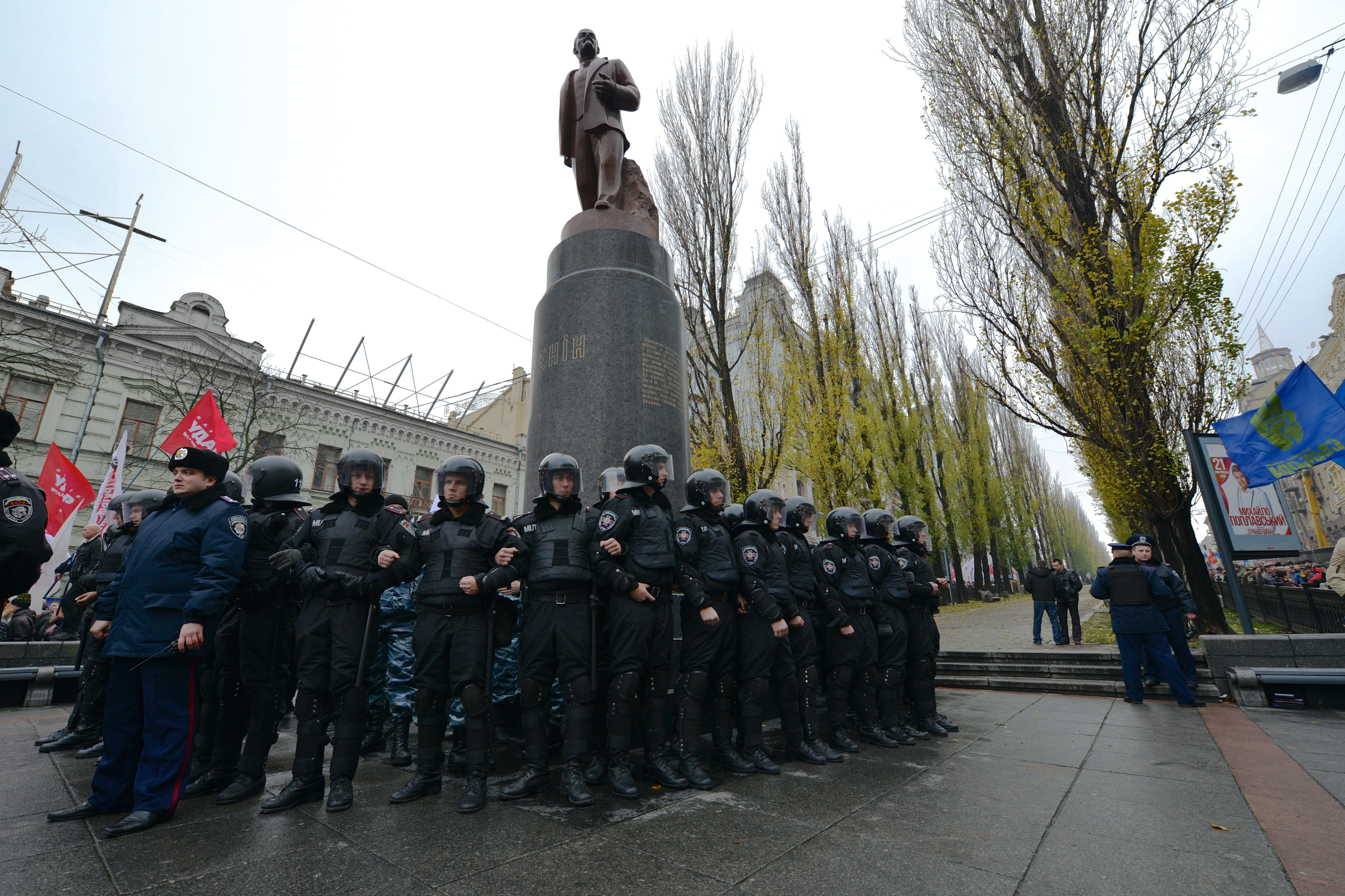
Cordon of Barse and Berkut guarding the statue of the Communist leader, Vladimir Lenin (24 November).

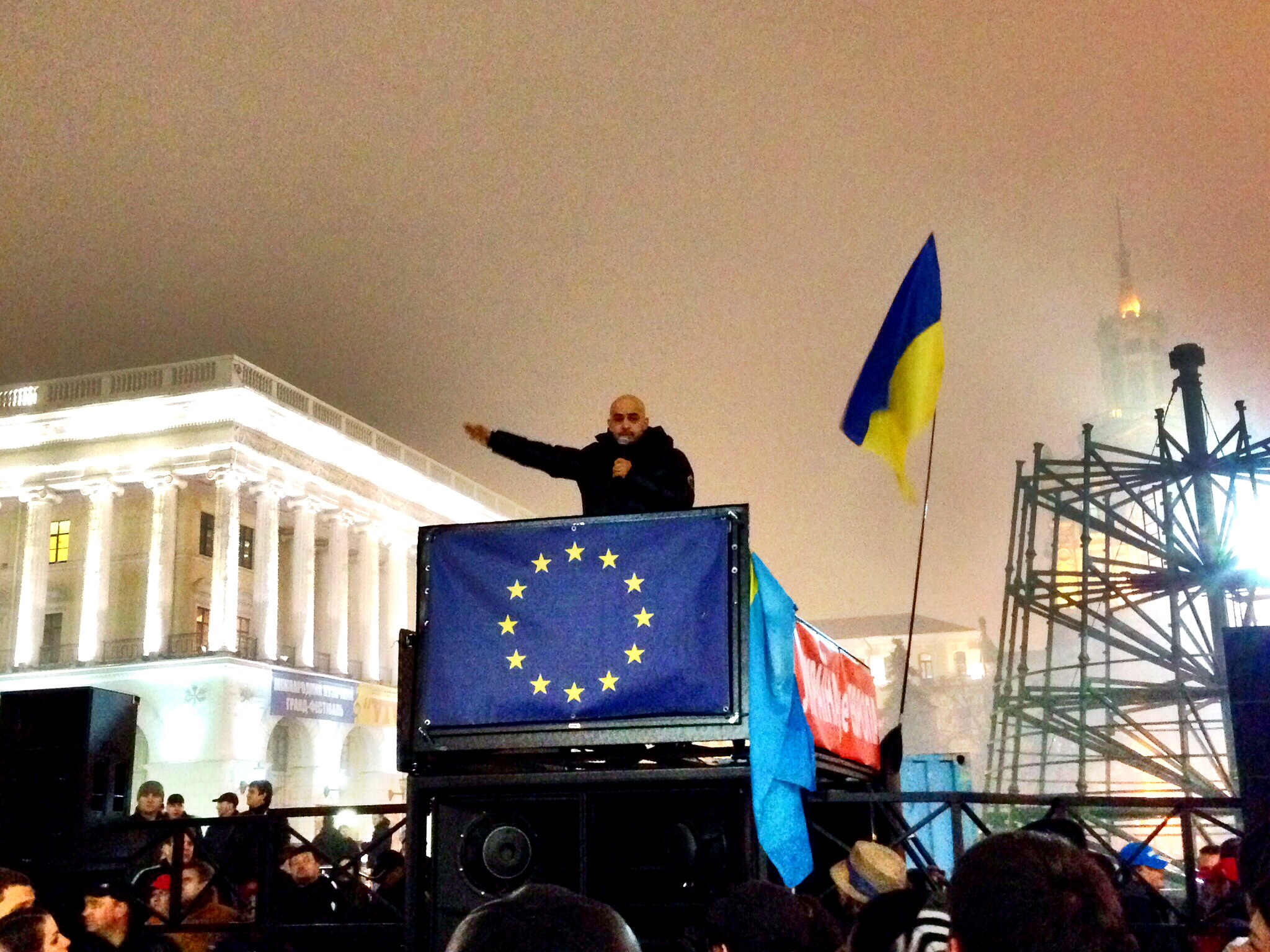
Mustafa Nayem on Euromaidan, 23 November 2013

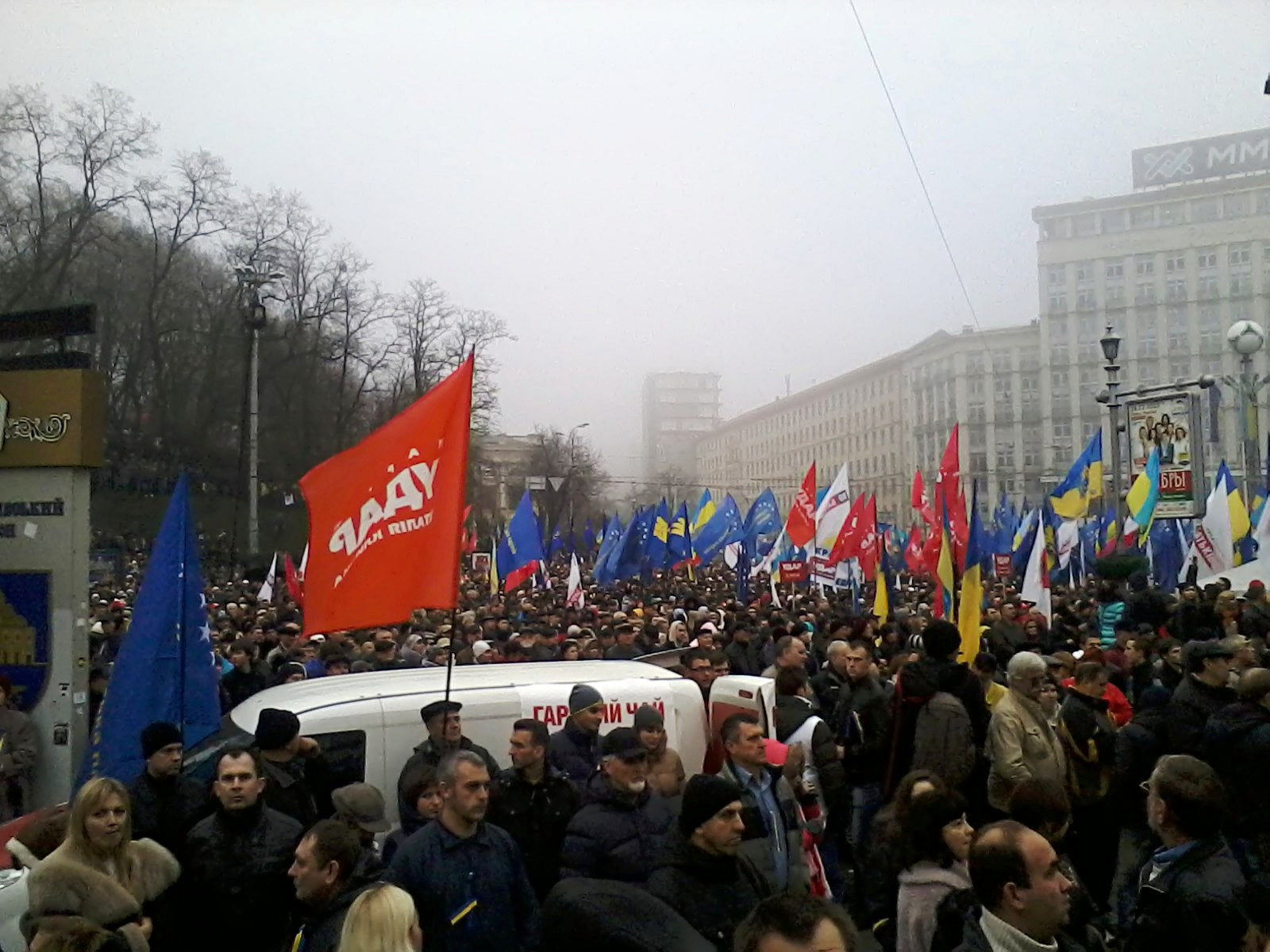
Protests in Kyiv on 24 November 2013

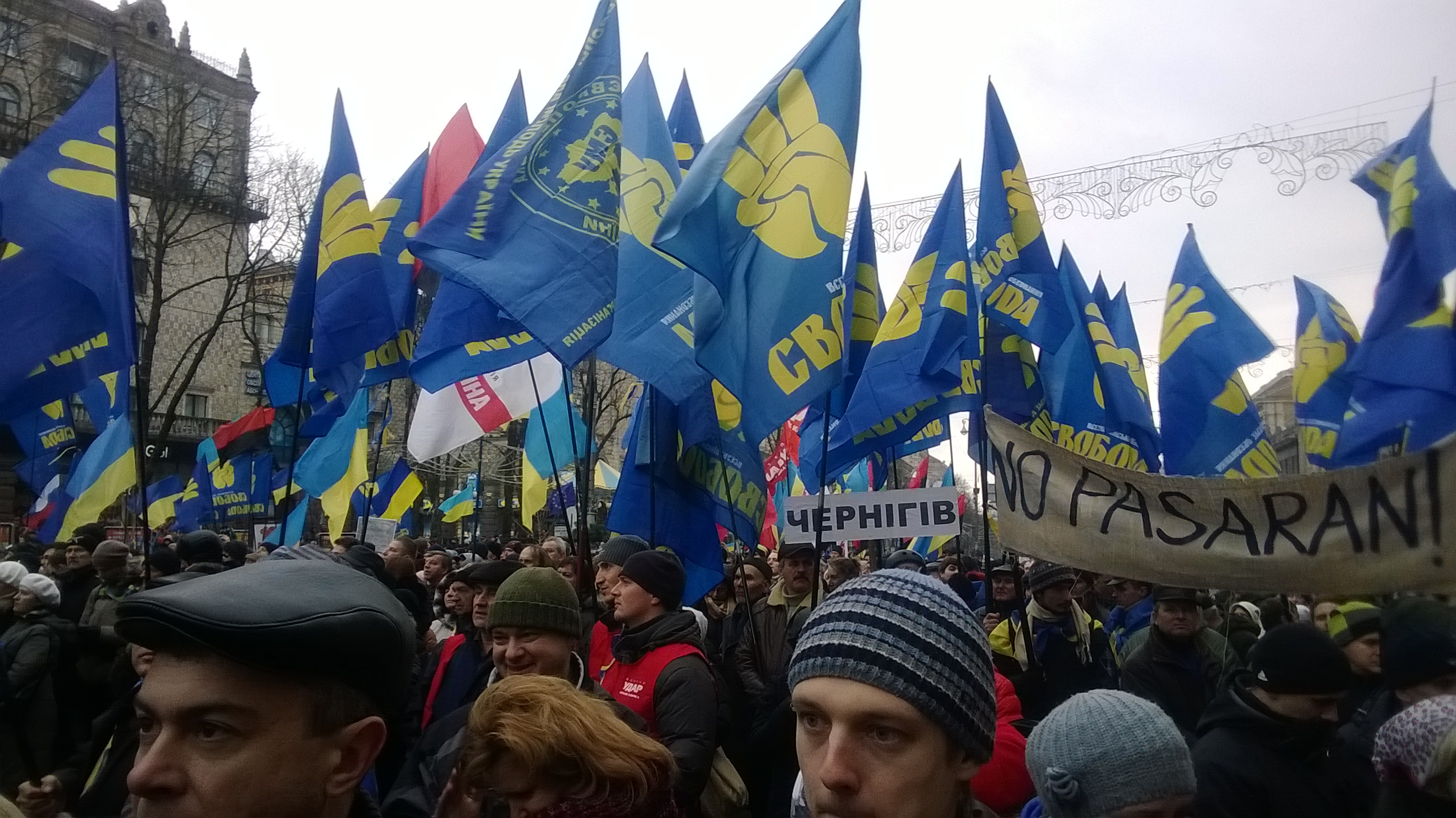
Pro-EU protests in Kyiv, 1 December 2013

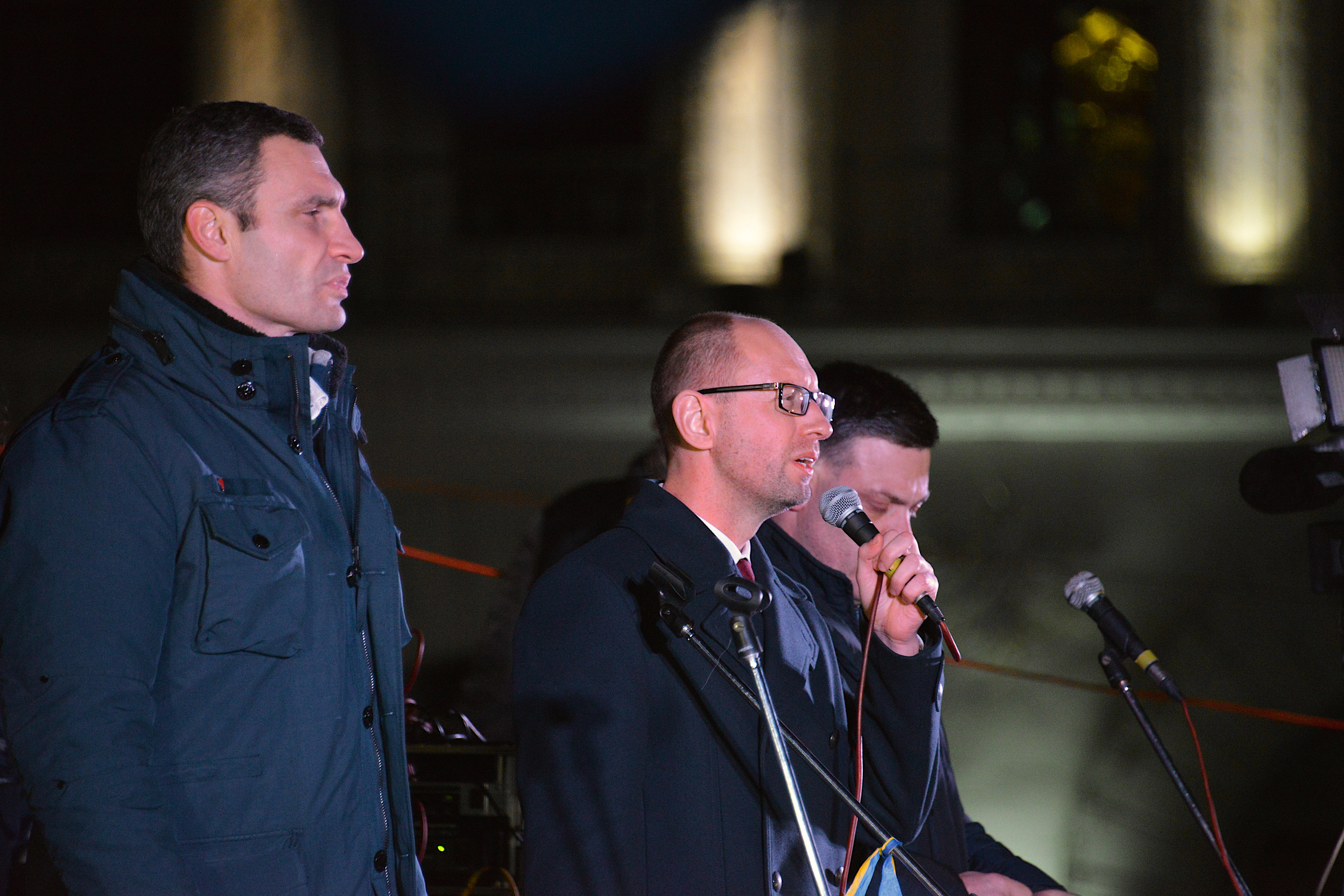
Three opposition leaders on Maidan

Euromaidan (Ukrainian: Євромайдан, romanized: Yevromaidan, lit. 'Euro Square' (Note: The term "Euromaidan" was initially used as a hashtag on Twitter. A Twitter account named Euromaidan was created on the first day of the protests. It soon became popular in the international media. It is composed of two parts: "Euro" is short for Europe and "maidan" refers to Maidan Nezalezhnosti (Independence Square), the main square of Kyiv, where the protests are centered.), Russian: Евромайдан, Jevromajdán) was a wave of demonstrations and civil unrest in Ukraine, which began on the night of 21 November 2013 with large public protests demanding closer European integration. Protesters also stated they joined because of the dispersal of protesters on 30 November and "a will to change life in Ukraine". The scope of the protests evolved over subsequent months, and by 25 January 2014 the protests were fueled by the perception of widespread government corruption, abuse of power, and violation of human rights in Ukraine. By February 2014 the protests had largely escalated into violence, resulting in the Revolution of Dignity and the resignation of Azarov's government and ousting of President Yanukovych. This resulted in the outbreak of the Russo-Ukrainian War.

== 21–29 November 2013 ==
Euromaidan started in the night of 21 November 2013 when up to 2,000 protesters gathered at Kyiv's Maidan Nezalezhnosti and began to organize themselves with the help of social networks. After he heard of the Ukrainian government decree to suspend preparations for signing of the Association Agreement on 21 November 2013, opposition party Batkivshchyna faction leader Arseniy Yatsenyuk called, via Twitter, for protests (which he dubbed #Euromaidan) on Maidan Nezalezhnosti. The blog of Yuri Andreev on Korrespondent.net asked people to gather on Maidan Nezalezhnosti that day at 22:30.

Approximately 2,000 people converged in the evening of 22 November on Maidan Nezalezhnosti (Independence Square) to protest the decision of the Ukrainian government to suspend the process of integration of Ukraine into the European Union. In the following days, the opposition and pro-EU parties led the protests.

On 22 November in a telephone call with Lithuanian president Dalia Grybauskaitė Viktor Yanukovych admitted that he cannot sign the agreement due to Russia's blackmail and threats to restrict imports.

A larger rally took place on 24 November, when 50,000 to 200,000 people gathered on Kyiv's Maidan Nezalezhnosti. The pro-EU demonstrators carrying Ukrainian and EU flags chanted "Ukraine is Europe" and sang the national anthem as they marched toward European Square for the rally. News agencies claimed this to be the largest protest since the Orange Revolution of 2004. After a small group of protesters attempted to storm the Government Building, police used tear gas to disperse them. Police officials claimed that protesters had been first to use tear gas and smoke grenades. According to the General Prosecutor's Office, more than 400 people were injured from 24 November to 13 December, including 200 policemen and 18 students.

On 25 November jailed former Prime Minister Yulia Tymoshenko began a hunger strike in protest of "President Yanukovych's reluctance to sign the Deep and Comprehensive Free Trade Agreement".

A 26 November 2013 statement by Ukrainian Prime Minister Mykola Azarov saying "I affirm with full authority that the negotiating process over the Association Agreement is continuing, and the work on moving our country closer to European standards is not stopping for a single day" did not appease protesters who blockaded the government building during the cabinet session during which Azarov made the above-mentioned statement. The same day the city of Kyiv installed a heating tent (hot tea and sandwiches were served) at Maidan Nezalezhnosti, where about 2,000 students were rallying. According to Kyiv Post this was part of a "Ukrainian authorities' attempt to portray themselves as allies with the demonstrators who, in many cases, are calling for the government to resign if it doesn't sign an association agreement with the European Union this week". The same day it was reported that social media accounts of protesters were being hacked and disreputable messages being posted in place of rally news and commentary.

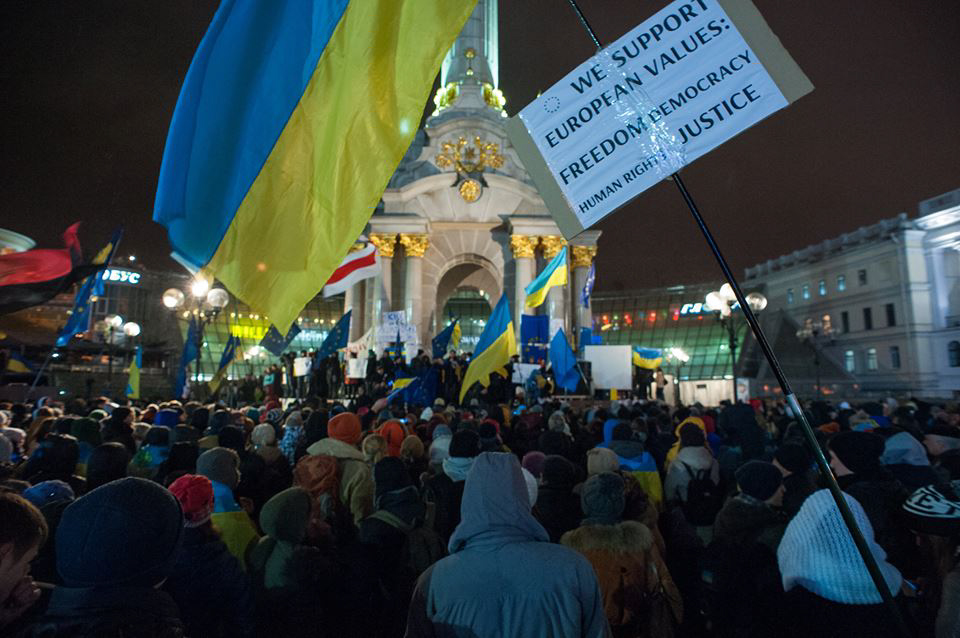
Thousands of Ukrainians are continuing to express support to European integration and protesting against decision of Ukrainian government to refuse signing of association with EU in Vilnius. 27 November 2013. Kyiv, Ukraine.

On 26 and 27 November 2013 Lithuanian Parliament Speaker Loreta Graužinienė and Polish Sejm Member Marcin Święcicki spoke to the protesters at Maidan Nezalezhnosti. Musical acts like Ruslana put on performances for demonstrators on Maidan Nezalezhnosti. On 27 November it was reported that the Kharkiv Polytechnical Institute staff allegedly checked class attendance, threatening truant students who attend the pro-EU rallies in Kyiv with expulsion. In other universities, administrators forbade students from joining pro-EU protests, posting political commentary to social media networks, and wearing Ukraine-EU ribbons. According to Euronews the protesters in Kyiv numbered ten thousand people, many of them students.

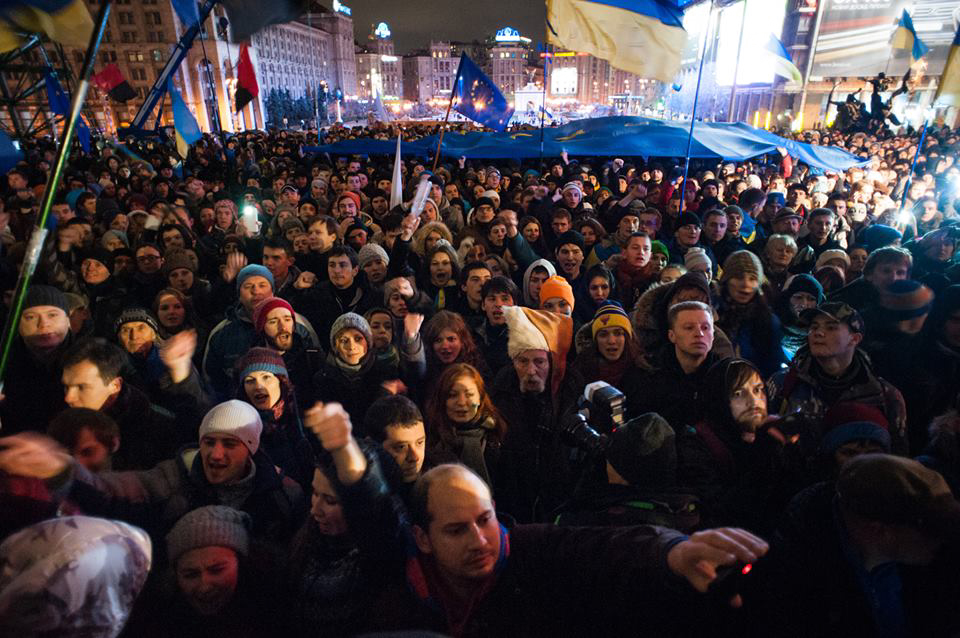
Maidan Nezalezhnosti flooded with pro-EU protesting people. 27 November 2013. Kyiv, Ukraine.

At noon of 28 November (the eighth day of protests) about 3,000 people gathered on Maidan Nezalezhnosti; no party symbols were reported, only Ukrainian flags and European Union flags. The crowd grew to 4,000 by the evening while it was again entertained by popular Ukrainian artists.

On 29 November 2013, it became clear that Ukraine did not sign the Association Agreement at the Eastern Partnership Summit in Vilnius. The number of protesters in Kyiv swelled to 10,000. In Lviv, protesters numbered some 20,000. As in Kyiv the Lviv protesters locked hands in a human chain, symbolically linking Ukraine to the European Union (organizers claimed that some 100 people even crossed the Ukrainian-Polish border to extend the chain to the European Union). Euronews reported that protesters in Kyiv believed the rally should go on and were calling for the second Azarov Government's and President Viktor Yanukovych's resignation.

== 30 November attack on protesters ==
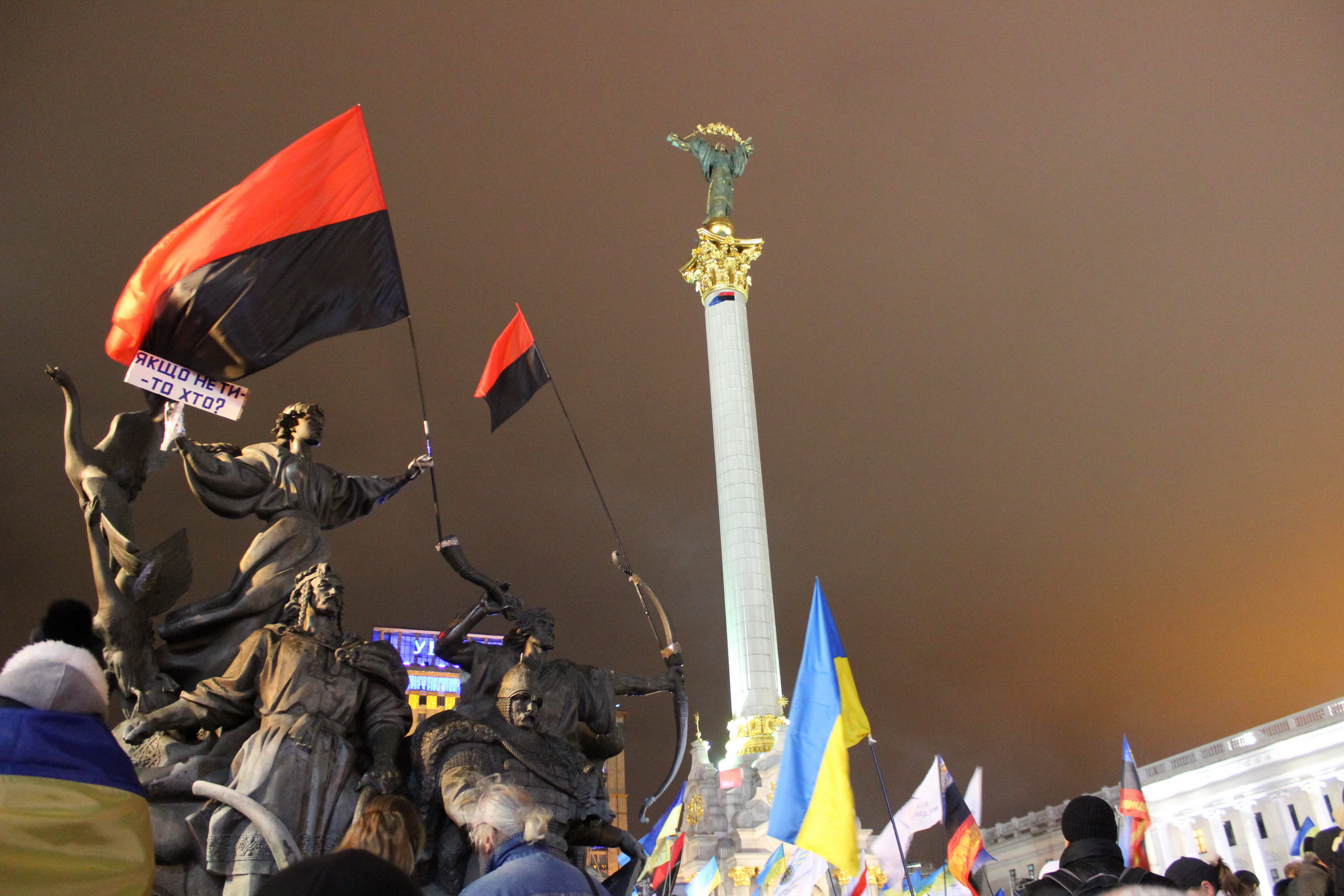
Maidan Nezalezhnosti on 29 November, the night before the attack

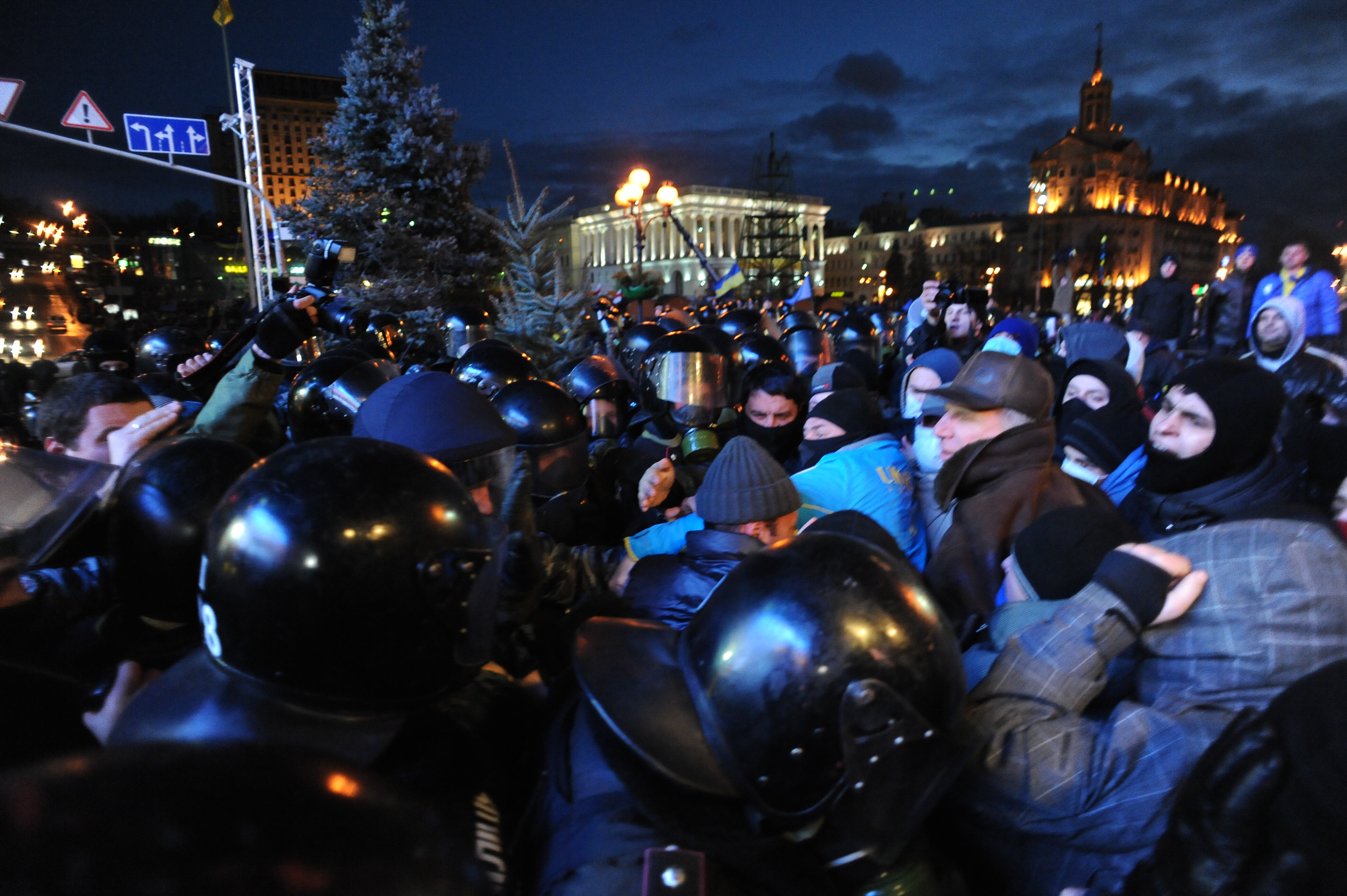
Berkut police attack protesters on the night of 30 November

On the night of 30 November 2013 at 04:00, armed with batons, stun grenades, and tear gas, Berkut special police units attacked and dispersed all protesters from Maidan Nezalezhnosti while suppressing mobile phone communications. The police attacked not only the protesters (most of whom failed to put up resistance) but also other civilians in the vicinity of Maidan Nezalezhnosti, when the Berkut forces chased unarmed people several hundreds of meters and continued to beat them with batons and feet. Initially, 35 people were injured as a result of the militia raid, including a Reuters cameraman and a photographer. Other protesters were detained. Most protesters were students. At 09:20 Berkut besieged the St. Michael's Golden-Domed Monastery where approximately 50 Euromaidan activists, including the injured, found sanctuary. Police spokeswoman Olha Bilyk justified the police raid by saying that protesters were interfering with preparations to decorate the square for the Christmas and New Year's holidays, and accused them of throwing stones and burning logs. Minister of Internal Affairs Vitaliy Zakharchenko later apologized and claimed "riot police abused their power" and promised a thorough investigation. Via state television he added "if there are calls for mass disturbances, then we will react to this harshly".

In an official statement, Ukrainian Deputy Prosecutor General Anatoliy Pryshko confirmed that 79 people were injured during the raid, including 6 students, 4 reporters, and 2 foreigners; 10 people were hospitalized. In addition, 7 policemen were also injured.

On 30 November 2013 by 13:00 another spontaneous meeting was taking place at St. Michael's Square near the St. Michael's Monastery as Maidan Nezalezhnosti continued to be guarded by the Berkut formations. Ambassadors from some ten countries of the European Union, among which was the Ambassador of the European Union in Ukraine, Jan Tombiński, visited protesters at the meeting. According to Hromadske.TV, by 16:00 the meeting gathered some 5,000 people who were shouting "Won't forgive", and "Revolution". At St. Michael Square protesters started to form units of self-resistance. Approximately 10,000 protesters remained in the evening of the 30th, with an estimated 10,000 more from Lviv travelling to Kyiv on Saturday night.

On 30 November opposition parties Batkivshchyna, UDAR and Svoboda set up "Headquarters of National Resistance" throughout Ukraine.

== 1 December 2013 Euromaidan riots ==
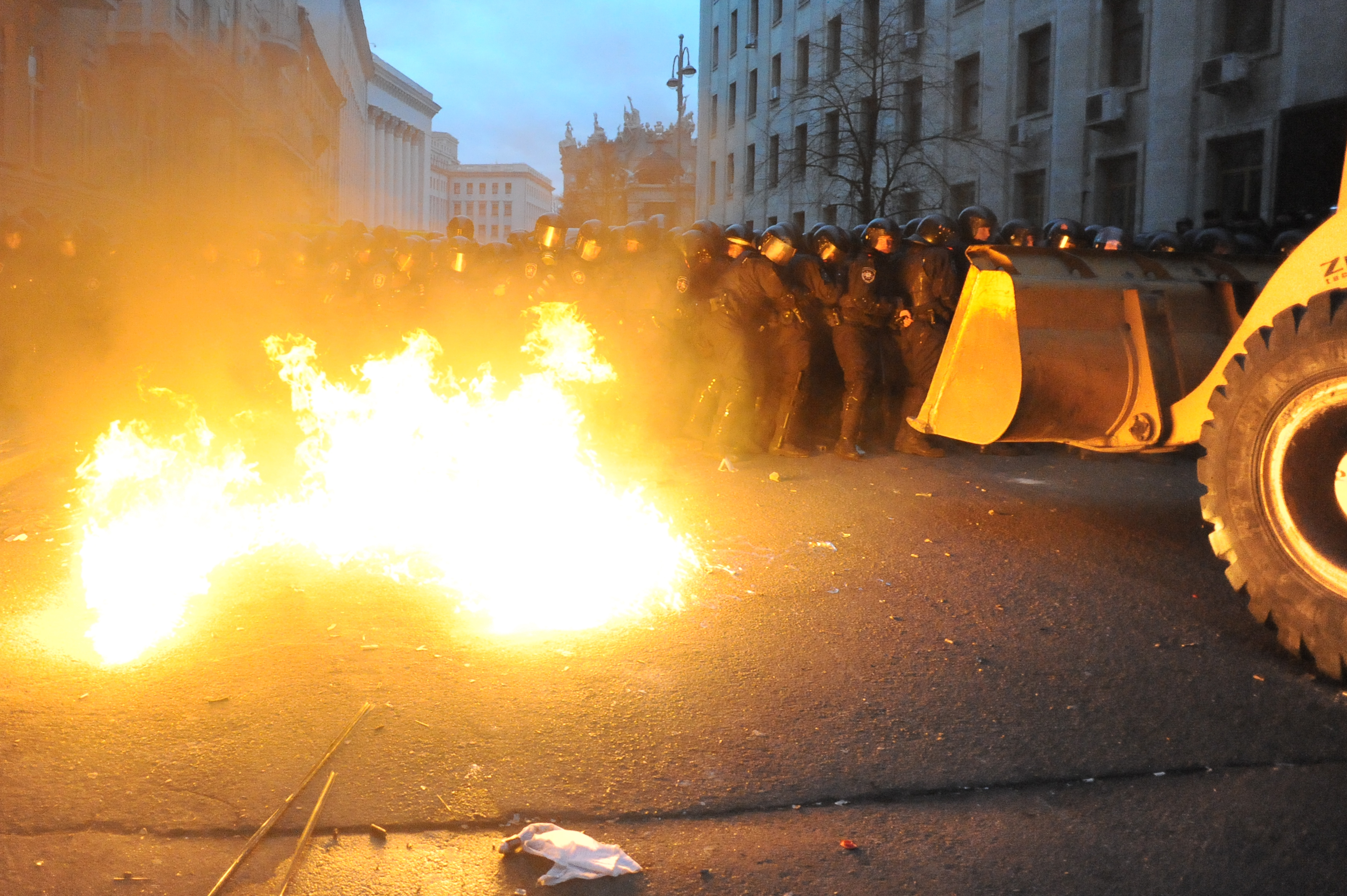
Tractor assault on Bankova Street

A series of riots occurred in several locations of downtown Kyiv, Ukraine, on 1 December 2013 in response to a violent police crackdown on Euromaidan's peaceful protesters and journalist on the night of 30 November. The day saw the highest numbers of journalists injured by police in a single event since Ukraine's independence in 1991. Also, 1 December became the first instance of a public building being occupied by protesters in the modern history of the country.

== 2–7 December 2013 ==
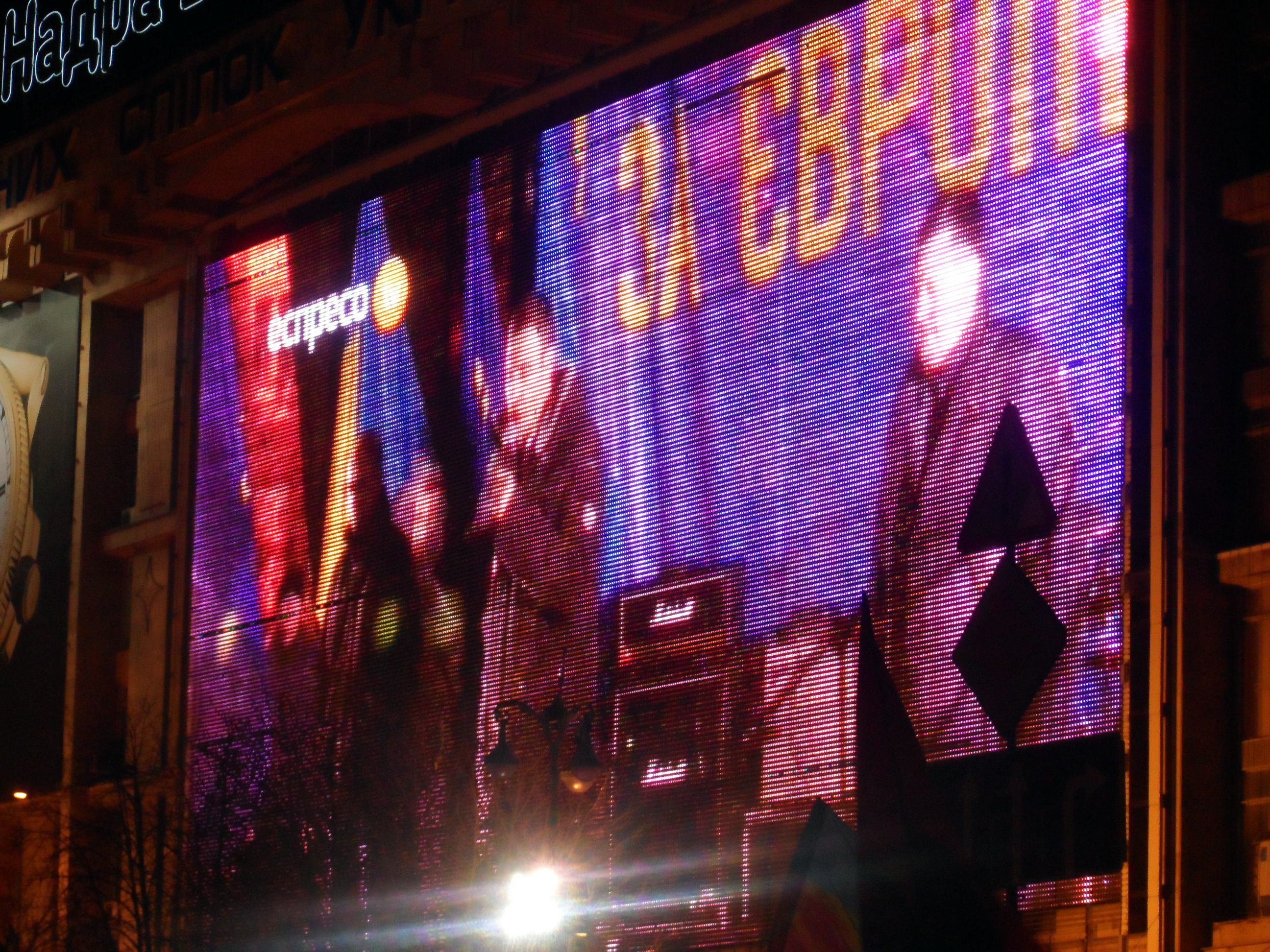
Vitali Klitschko addresses the crowds in Independence Square, Kyiv, at 7:27 pm on 3 December – as shown live on screen overlooking the Square

The day after the riots, peaceful protests continued to take place and occupy Maidan Nezalezhnosti in Kyiv, with tens of thousands attending, while thousands blocked the main Cabinet buildings. According to BBC correspondent David Stern "They have set up almost a military camp of sorts, and have erected a very impressive barricade around the perimeter of the demonstration". David M. Herszenhorn of The New York Times described the square as "oddly festive" and added that "Protest leaders, sensing that momentum had turned to their advantage, continued to add infrastructure to their operation, bringing in television monitors and erecting the small tent city". Elsewhere, Lviv, Ternopil and Ivano-Frankivsk announced a general strike in solidarity with the movement. 1,000 Internal Troops (National Guard) were deployed to Kyiv around key government buildings by the Interior Ministry. The parliament committee on statehood and self-governance recommended a vote of no-confidence in Prime Minister Mykola Azarov 's government, opening a way for such a vote on 3 December. The Kyiv City Council building remained occupied by protesters. (Note: The Kyiv City Council building remained occupied by protesters with 'Revolution HQ' painted on the façade.) Workers at Kyiv City Council were still allowed to enter and work. (Note: BBC correspondent David Stern reported on 2 December "Protesters also continue to occupy the Kyiv city administration building. The scene inside is chaotic – and sometimes comical, with thousands of people streaming through as if on a tourist excursion.")

On 3 December the Azarov Government survived the vote of no-confidence with 186 MPs supporting the motion, and all but 1 Party of Regions MP abstaining from the vote; at least 226 votes were needed. However; the Communist Party of Ukraine, that had not supported this vote, stated that on 4 December they would put forward their own no confidence motion, based on the government's management of the economy. If the 186 MPs supporting 3 December motion support 4 December no-confidence motion – which they have stated they will – 4 December motion will pass with over 226 votes. In his speech to parliament (Note: Because Azarov addressed the parliament in Russian his speech was at times inaudible and drowned out by chants of "Speak Ukrainian!" and "Resign!" by Ukrainian nationalist MPs.), Azarov warned protesters occupying the Kyiv City State Administration that force could be used to remove them. In the morning of 3 December Euronews described the situation in Kyiv as "calm at the moment, however tensions have remained high". Clashes with riot police did occur outside of parliament. In the afternoon, in freezing conditions, several thousand protesters rallied on Maidan Nezalezhnosti where opposition leaders gave passionate speeches. After the speeches, the crowd moved to the Presidential Administration Building. According to the Ministry of Internal Affairs over 10,000 demonstrators rallied on Maidan Nezalezhnosti in the evening of 3 December; it also noted that it had recorded no incidents. Demonstrators started to pitch about 10 army tents (including a campfire) on the square, and about 10 on Khreshchatyk; while Ukrainian performers entertained the demonstrators. Interfax-Ukraine reported that opposition leaders Arseniy Yatsenyuk, Oleh Tyahnybok and Vitali Klitschko met with foreign ambassadors that same evening. The next day they met with German Foreign Minister Guido Westerwelle in Kyiv (including a walk on Maidan Nezalezhnosti).

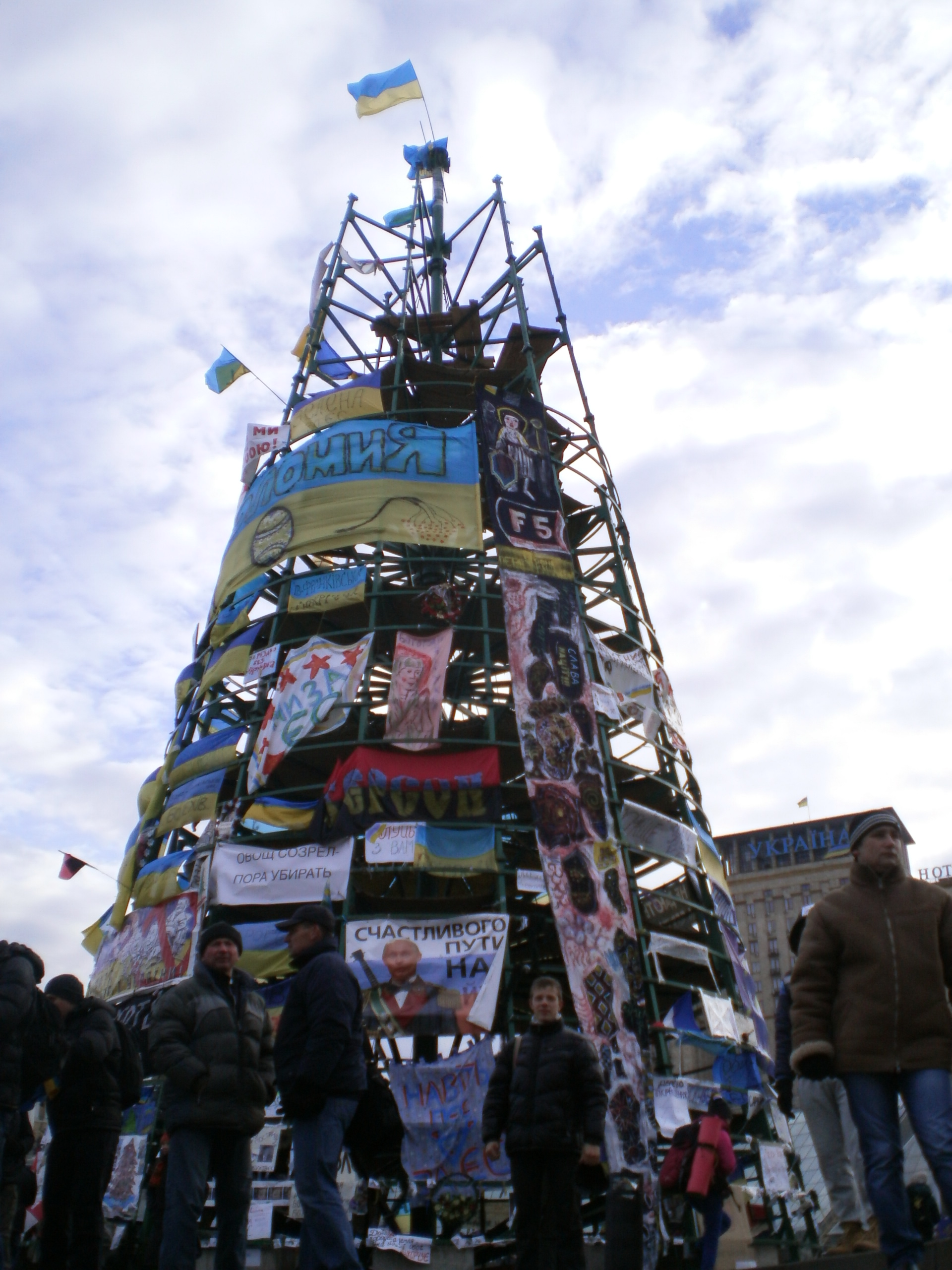
Protesters have scaled the Christmas tree on Maidan, decorating it with signs and flags

On 5 December 2013 the protest continued with several thousand demonstrators continuing to rally on Maidan Nezalezhnosti; an Interfax correspondent reported that "the situation on the square is calm" and that wooden barricades were installed on Instytytska and Horodetskoho Street. An Interfax-Ukraine correspondent reported that police buses blocked several streets leading to the Verkhovna Rada (parliament) and that about 150 "people waving flags of Svoboda and the red-and-black flags of Ukrainian nationalists" were rallying in front of the central entrance to the Budynok Uryadu (the administrative building for the Cabinet of Ministers of Ukraine). Meanwhile, several hundred supporters of the Party of Regions and President Yanukovych pitched a camp (encircled by a metal fence) on the square in Mariinskyi park (in front of the main entrance to the Verkhovna Rada). The OSCE security group summit in Kyiv advanced as planned.

Viktoria Siumar, a prominent journalist and former head of Institute of Mass Information, reported that Secretary (head) of the National Security and Defense Council of Ukraine, Andriy Klyuyev, met with TV managers on 6 December urging them to limit Euromaidan coverage. This took place concurrent to Prime Minister Azarov's critical statement of the media in the country, in which he stated there was a lack of coverage towards pro-government rallies, a "disproportionate bias in coverage," and that "everywhere is dominated by only one point of view, and it is a distortion of reality, away from democracy." (Note: "Many people say that central television channels don't cover events in our industrial regions, don't show rallies in support of the government, although these regions form 90% of public revenues," he wrote on Facebook on 6 December 2013. The same day he also wrote on Facebook "Dear friends, first of all we need to calm down now, put aside emotions and think hard and seriously. We have proposed the only right and correct way in this situation. We hope our EU partners will meet us halfway and understand that they should lend a helping hand to Ukraine now".) The same day the Director of the Office for Democratic Institutions and Human Rights within the OSCE Janez Lenarčič stated that the government's demand that protesters unblock governmental buildings was "lawful" and "fully consistent with the acceptable restrictions on the freedom of assembly". However, he also stated that 30 November court ban on demonstrations in central Kyiv was "an unqualified ban on demonstrations, in other words on peaceful assemblies, which is disproportionate and in contradiction to Ukraine's OSCE commitments". Jailed former Ukrainian Prime Minister Yulia Tymoshenko ended her hunger strike that she had started on 25 November in protest of "President Yanukovych's reluctance to sign the DCFTA" on 6 December. The same day police and a court order blocked a planned protest at President Yanukovych's private residence Mezhyhirya.

An unscheduled meeting between President Yanukovych and Russian President Vladimir Putin took place in the south Russian city of Sochi on 6 December 2013. Ukrainian Foreign Affairs Minister Leonid Kozhara stated the cooperative agreements signed in Sochi were primarily in the fields of space, aircraft construction, and engineering. Prime Minister Mykola Azarov elaborated on the matter, saying the two met to discuss the drafting of a strategic partnership agreement, eliminate disputes over trading and economic issues, and in a separate announcement told journalists that the president would soon visit Moscow on 17 December, where a "major agreement" would be signed. This prompted opposition leader Arseniy Yatsenyuk to issue a stern warning towards Yanukovych, saying "If Yanukovych tries to sign anything with Russia about the Customs Union it will lead to a bigger wave of protests." Later, The Economist's senior editor Edward Lucas, citing his own diplomatic sources, reported on his Twitter that Yanukovych had allegedly signed a pact with Russia which included terms whereby Ukraine would receive $5 billion and a natural gas price reduction in exchange for an agreement to join their Customs Union at a later date. Upon hearing the news, opposition leaders expressed fury, and demanded that the alleged documents be made public immediately. The governments of Russia and Ukraine categorically denied any Customs Union talks took place during the meetings, however, Russian presidential spokesman Dmitry Peskov did confirm (on 7 December) that the two sides discussed financial aid and credit, and were also now "significantly" closer in talks over natural gas prices. (Note: Traditionally Ukraine imports natural gas mainly from Russia (about two-thirds of its gas in 2012). Natural gas is Ukraine's biggest import at present and is the main cause of the country's structural trade deficit.) At the same time, Yatsenyuk claimed to have information that the planned 17 December Ukrainian-Russian strategic partnership agreement would involve Ukraine's joining of the Customs Union, but added that Ukraine's parliament would be unlikely to ratify it. The Ukrainian Foreign Ministry stated on 10 December that "No documents were expected to be signed and, naturally, no documents were signed during the Sochi meeting"; it also informed that a Ukrainian delegation would attend a 13 December CIS Economic Council in Moscow were "Special attention will be given to the aspects of the realization of the treaty of a free trade zone of October 18, 2011".

== 8–10 December 2013 ==
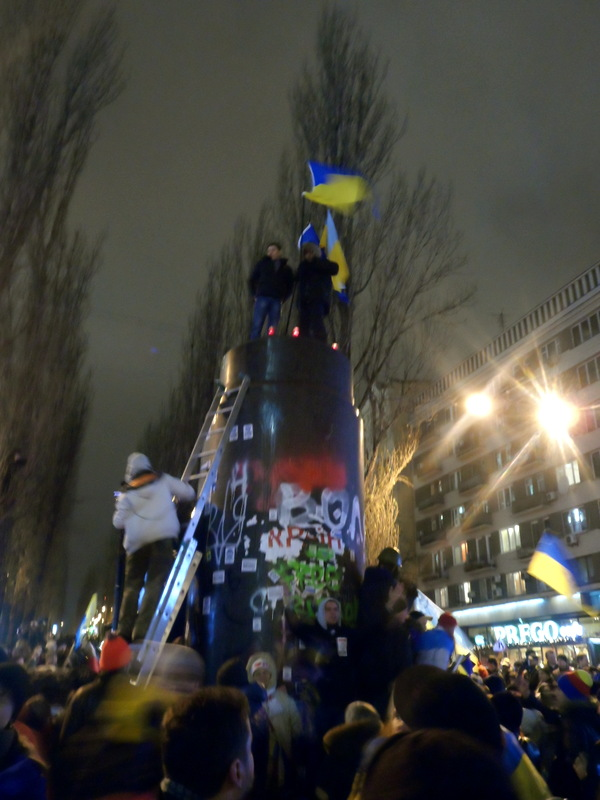
Demonstrators on the plinth of the demolished Lenin statue in Kyiv, 8 December

8 December marked the third Sunday in a row of mass protest in Kyiv. Opposition leaders billed the day as the "March of a Million", and all opposition parties claimed the turnout met the 1,000,000 mark. According to Interfax-Ukraine, initial reports estimated the number "greatly exceed[s] 100,000 people," which matched police estimates. Associated Press correspondents on the ground and leading world media reported that 500,000 attended. A survey of protesters conducted on the 7th and 8th found that 92% of those who came to Kyiv from across Ukraine came on their own initiative, and 8% came as part of a political party or civil society organization. In terms of cause, 70% said they came to protest the police brutality of 30 November, and 54% to protest in support of the European Union Association Agreement signing. Among their demands, 82% wanted detained protesters freed, 80% wanted the government to resign, and 75% want president Yanukovych to resign and for snap elections.

After the rally, a large group of Ukrainian protesters toppled the statue to Lenin in Kyiv. Unlike the previous week, police officers on the scene withdrew without attempting to defend the monument. After the statue was taken down, the group shouted "Yanukovych, you'll be next!", and proceeded to smash the statue with a sledgehammer, decapitate it, and dismantle it for souvenirs; in place of the statue was planted a Ukrainian and red-and-black insurgency flag. The Svoboda party took credit for the statue's destruction, with several party MPs, including Ihor Miroshnichenko, joining the crowd and taking part in the act.

Protesters traveling from Belarus who were en route to Kyiv to support the protests were denied entry into the country at the border crossing near Chernihiv (where protests have been banned by the local police), while other reports saw traffic officers puncturing the tires of a bus carrying Belarusians. The same day, Party of Regions MP Oleh Tsarev requested to the Security Service and Foreign Ministry of Ukraine to deport or/and ban foreign organizers and political consultants, document scans of which he posted (and later removed) on his Facebook account. Among those named in the document notably included Andreas Umland, Stanislav Belkovsky, Taras Kuzio, Gleb Pavlovsky, and former Georgian president Mikheil Saakashvili, among others.

As many as 500,000 rallied in Kyiv on 8 December

In the early morning of 9 December, some 730 Tiger and Leopard special forces, whose base of operations had previously been blocked by a motorcade of protesters in Vasylkiv (outside Kyiv), broke through the cordone with support from Berkut troops to travel into the city. The same day three metro stations in the center of the city – Teatralna, Khreschatyk and Maidan Nezalezhnosti were closed, and trains ran through them without stopping, after the Kyiv police had received an anonymous bomb threat. Teatralna station was reopened late afternoon after police completed a fruitless search for possible explosives. In the afternoon the BBC reported that Ukrainian police had begun dismantling protest camps in front of government buildings in Kyiv. The protesters had been given until Tuesday (10 December) to leave. They were blockaded with cars, barricades and tents. According to the BBC, no clashes had been reported, but its reporter in Kyiv, Steve Rosenberg, described the situation as "tense with various rumours circulating" and that priests were urging the police not to use force, while blessing them. Meanwhile, Interfax-Ukraine reported about more police movements and removal of protest barricades in Kyiv. The Ministry of Internal Affairs issued a statement that "MPs have informed us that spade handles and other objects that could be used to cause bodily injuries have been distributed to the protesters at the opposition's self-defense posts". It also stated no action was being taken on Maidan Nezalezhnosti. Opposition leader (of the Batkivshchyna party) Arseniy Yatsenyuk meanwhile complained about violence against demonstrators and stated "We do not beat policeman, we do not use force, we do not have any weapons and we do not have any special means". Fellow opposition leader Vitaly Klitschko concerted with that. Svoboda leader Oleh Tyahnybok warned that the government was planning to cut off electricity before an attack on the Euromaidan rallies in central Kyiv "But we are preparing to use alternative ways to continue the existence of our camp". He also warned that Russian Federal Security Service (FSB) and police had arrived in Ukraine "With the aim of organizing mass disorder."

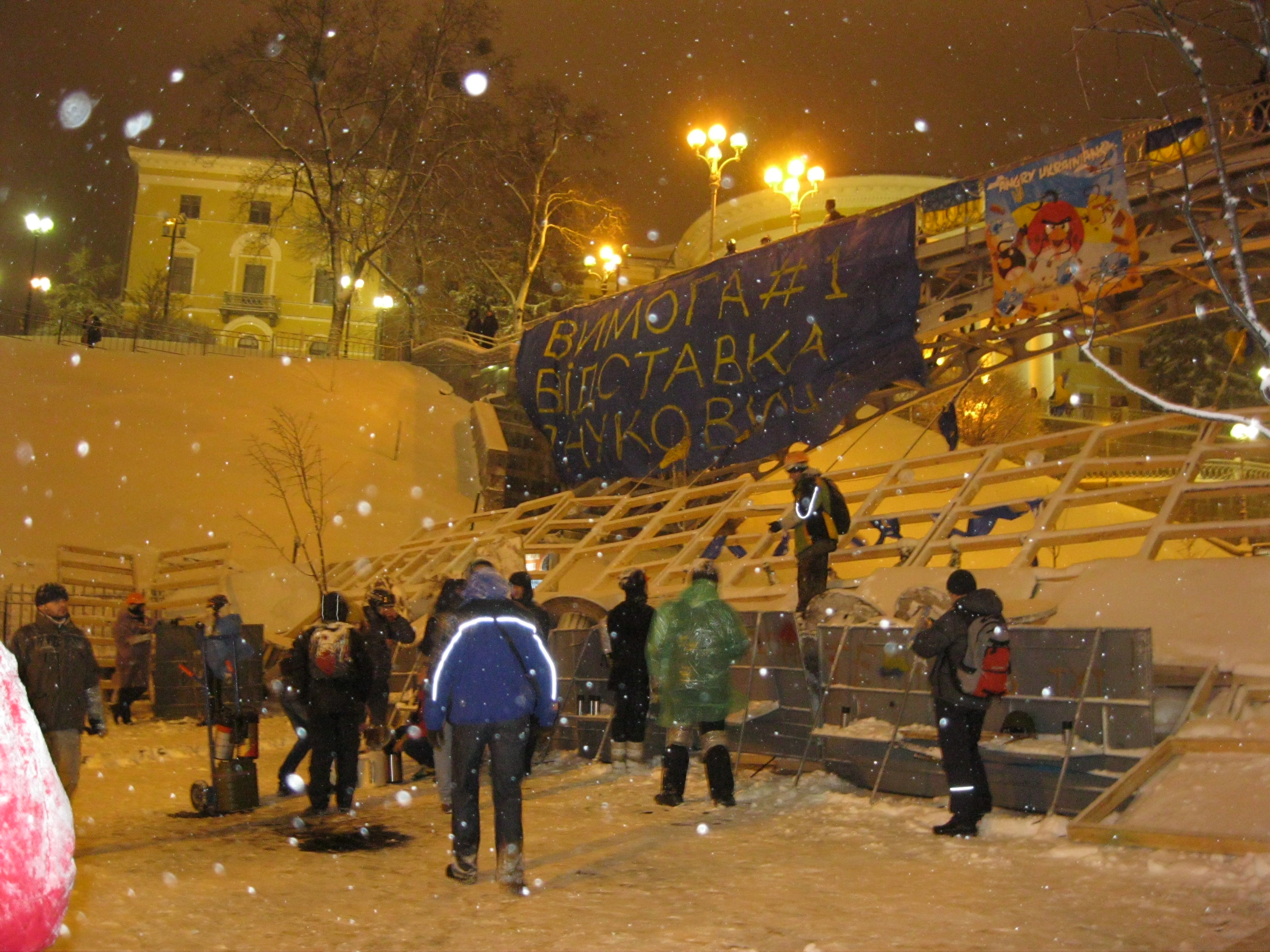
Euromaidan protesters outside Maidan shopping mall Hlobus with a banner demanding the resignation of Victor Yanukovych on 9 December

The website of opposition party Batkivshchyna went offline on 9 December following a police raid on their headquarters. At their office on Turivska Street in Podil, "In the corridor we have people with machine guns, trying to break through into server rooms," said Ostap Semerak, a Batkivshchyna member, and that some troops climbed in through its windows. It was described by witnesses that a special detachment of police in tactical gear destroyed all equipment in the offices, which also housed the newspaper INTV, Evening News and website Censor.Net.ua, who were raided in similar fashion shortly after The server room was described as "a mess", and the offices themselves were ransacked, and security cameras were destroyed. An Associated Press reporter confirmed broken glass and smashed computers in the offices. "The attackers did not introduce themselves or show any warrant," Censor.net editor Yuri Butusov told Reporters Without Borders. "They ordered all our staff to move away from their computers and to not use their mobile phones. Then they confiscated all our equipment. It was a criminal raid designed to eliminate a site that has been carrying information about the 'Euromaidan' movement." A police spokeswoman initially denied police had conducted any operations at the address, however, the Interior Ministry later admitted the attack on the Batkivshchyna office was sanctioned by a court order for "two criminal cases", pertaining to alleged "fraud and abuse of office". The police said they received a tip from a 'group of citizens' that "illegally seized computer equipment worth Hr 350,000" was on the premises, and that officials from the company 'abused their authority'. During the raid, computer equipment, database servers, and documents were confiscated as evidence. Shorter after, UDAR evacuated their offices on Horky Street, which in a press release stated was in relation to the raid on Batkivshchyna.

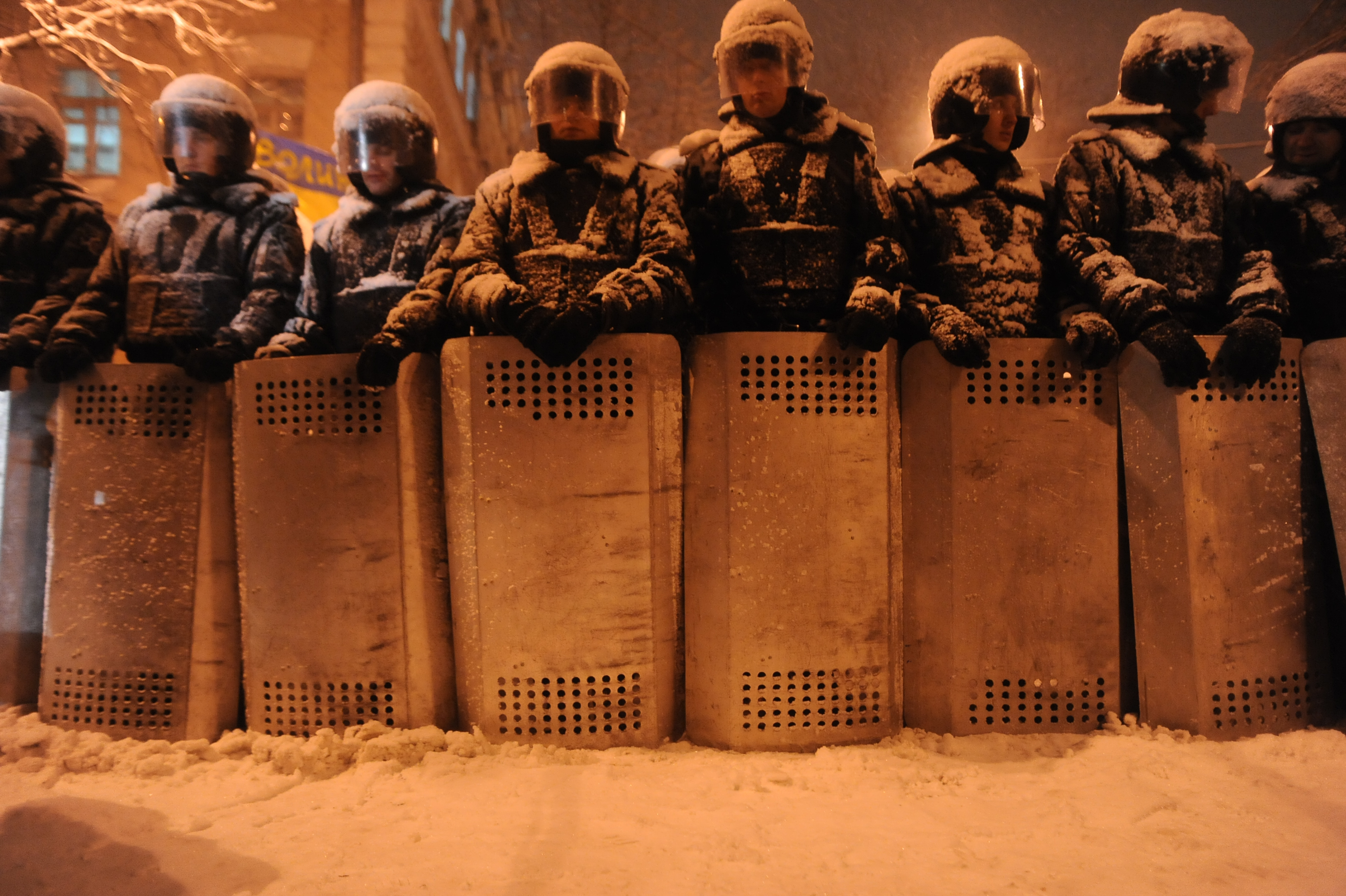
A line of riot police under heavy snow in Kyiv, 9 December

On 10 December at 1:00 am, the Ukrainian government cut off the power in the Kyiv City State Administration used by protesters as a headquarters. It was reported that protesters feared aggressive measures would be taken. At the same time, 1:00 am, public servants with their faces hidden and 100 riot police cleared the barricade at the cross section of the Hrushevskoho street and the Kriposnyj provulok in Kyiv. MP Andriy Shevchenko announced that police used their batons and kicked protesters. Hours later, 200 police advanced on the barricades on Lyuteranska and Bankova Street, with hundreds of protesters holding their ground, including Wladimir Klitschko. There, provocateurs penetrated into the ranks of the protesters, threatened with sticks, and used tear gas against the police, Hromadske.TV reported. During the clash over the barricaded encampment, there were about 12 to 15 injuries reported, including among police.

EU foreign policy and security High Representative Catherine Ashton held meetings in Ukraine on 10 and 11 December "to support a way out of the political crisis." Accompanied by a small delegation, she met President Yanukovych, governmental officials, opposition figures, and representatives of civil society. President Yanukovych also had a roundtable meeting with all three former presidents Leonid Kravchuk, Leonid Kuchma, and Viktor Yushchenko. During the meeting, discussed were the release of Euromaidan detainees, the implementation of future EU-related reforms, and Kuchma alluded to the possible dismissal of Prime Minister Azarov. The opposition and organizers of Euromaidan were not participants in the roundtable meeting. During the meeting President Yanukovych stated, "I have said many times that the program of the Party of Regions since 1997 has the strategic aim of Ukraine's integration with Europe" and that he had ordered the government to work on minimizing the economic risks to Ukraine that the signing of the Association Agreement with the EU would entail, by the time of the EU-Ukraine summit scheduled for the spring of 2014. It was also decided "that there will be a bilateral commission, with the European Union on the one side and Ukraine on the other" (with occasional consultations with Russia) to normalize relations between Ukraine and the EU. European Commissioner for Enlargement and European Neighbourhood Policy Štefan Füle responded that the EU was "willing to maintain dialogue with Russia to convince it that an Association Agreement will not harm its economic interests, but it will not hold tripartite negotiations on the matter". He also added that the EU was willing to provide financial aid to Ukraine for implementation of the Association Agreement. During 10 December talks, President Yanukovych expressed the wish to renegotiate the terms for the signing of the Association Agreement "If the agreement were signed as it is, it would create a lot of difficulties in the farming industry". On 10 December Svoboda leader Oleh Tyahnybok claimed Euromaidan leaders had not been invited to the roundtable meeting (he referred to the talks as "a stage-managed comedy"); the same day former president Kravchuk expressed hope that Euromaidan leaders would attend the meetings on 11 December.

== 11 December 2013 police clash with protesters ==
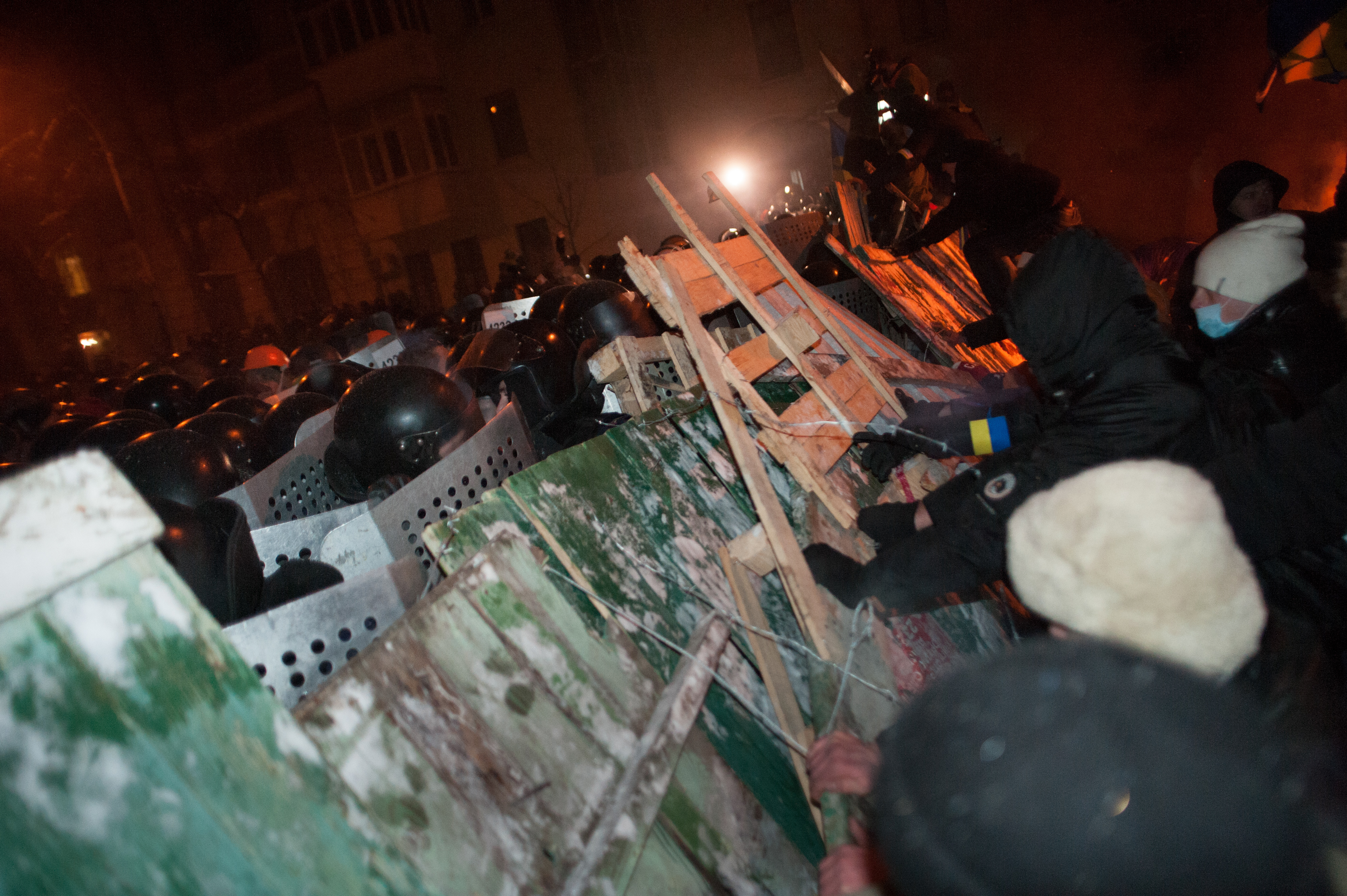
Police clash with protesters

In the early morning of 11 December, thousands of coordinated Internal Troops (VV) and Berkut surrounded the Maidan Nezalezhnosti (square) in order to clear out all remaining protesters, barricades, and encampments from its periphery in what was described as a 'determined and unexpected crackdown on protesters'. Temperatures fell to −13C (+9F), the coldest night of the winter to date in Kyiv. Several police officers confirmed they had been given orders to clear barricades from the boundaries of the square but not remove the tent camp that has sprung up inside the space. City workers used a bulldozer and chainsaws to clear away remaining barricades from the previous night's advance. There were no immediate signs of violence, and no attempt by riot police to take down camps located within the square itself. Many police were trapped behind protester lines during the scuffles but demonstrators allowed them to regroup and in some instances even handed back their shields. Police later pressed forward again. The fiercest battle came on the north side of the square, where hundreds of black-helmeted riot police struggled for several hours against lines of protesters who wore orange hardhats distributed by organizers.

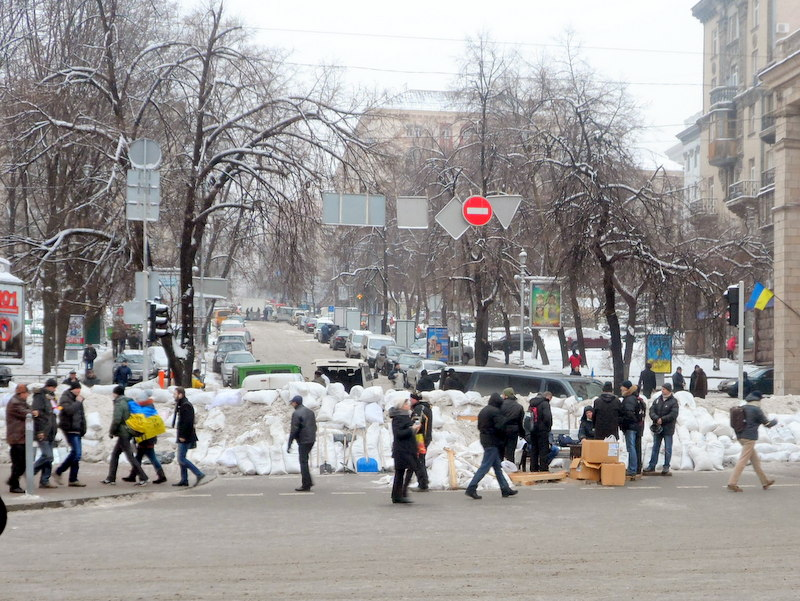
Barricade of snow and ice erected by protesters on the intersection of Khreshchatyk/Prorizna during the night of 11–12 December.

Taxi drivers and subway conductors played a notable role in organizing the rise of protesters, spreading the word of the crackdown and in the case of taxi drivers, offering rides into the center of the city. By 5:13 am, the crowd had swelled from 5,000 to 25,000 in just 9 hours. The confrontation between protesters and police during the removal of barricades is said to have reenergized the demonstrations. The barricades were rebuilt shortly after the departure of the police

The police stated that the clearing of the Maidan (police referred to it as "territory landscaping work") was carried out at night "to avoid additional noise and inconvenience to traffic and people, since the working week continues". Later that morning Ukrainian Interior Minister Vitaliy Zakharchenko stated "I want to calm everyone down: there will be no dispersal of Maidan [the rally at Maidan Nezalezhnosti]. Nobody is infringing upon the people's right to a peaceful protest. However, the rights and legitimate interests of other people cannot be ignored. The capital city's normal functioning cannot be disrupted." His Deputy Minister Viktor Ratushniak stated that afternoon, "If the enforcement service goes to the police and starts carrying out the court's ruling, the police will accordingly be involved. If the enforcement service does not request help from the police, the latter will stay out". Witnesses claimed 8 buses of "Leopard" Interior Troops had left deployment from Vyshhorod to Kyiv. In a separate incident, local media reported that a company of 220 Berkut troops based in Kirovohrad refused to accept orders to deploy to Kyiv, renouncing the use of force against peaceful protesters. The Interior Ministry denied the reports.

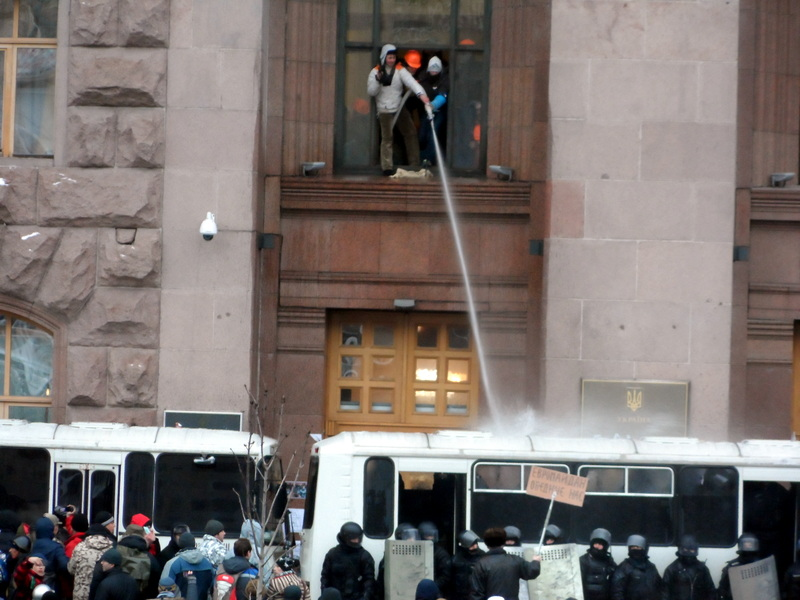
Demonstrators direct a hose at militia ranged outside Kyiv City Hall, 9:02 am, 11 December.

Overnight, activists formed self-defense groups to guard Kyiv City Hall. Police attempted to raid the building by mid-morning, which it swarmed with busloads of riot troops; but were held back by fire hoses, firecrackers, and smoke bombs. The steps to the building were also slicked with ice and cooking oil. By the afternoon, demonstrators on Khreshchatyk, at City Hall, and the Maidan had held off, and then outnumbered police, who then left the area.

Clashes during the raid and a standoff at City Hall sent 30 people to seek medical aid and fifteen to hospital, including nine police, officials stated. People hospitalized with frostbitten feet, head injuries, broken ribs, arms and legs, as well as back injuries. The Kyiv Post reported an instance of a Berkut officer blatantly clubbing a man in a Batkivshchyna party jacket as they advanced. Among the injured was Svoboda MP Andriy Illenko, who was seen in photos with his head bloodied and bandaged. Prime Minister Azarov denied that force has been used against demonstrators, calling the event "clearing the roads". 11 demonstrators were arrested during the clashes.

Protest leader Vitali Klitschko referred to the police actions as "senseless and brutal actions by the authorities" that only would help the number of protestors to go up. "This was the most stupid thing the authorities could have done," said Klitschko. "To clear out the square when Catherine Ashton is in town. People here are determined not to live in a police state." The incident also drew immediate criticism from European and American politicians, including Catherine Ashton and John Kerry.

Kyiv Passenger Railway Station and Terminal D of Boryspil International Airport were closed for hours and reopened after bomb threats made against them turned out to be hoaxes.

Also on 11 December Ukrainian Prime Minister Azarov stated that there will be no discussion about the Customs Union of Belarus, Kazakhstan, and Russia at a next round of negotiations with Russia: "There will be no discussion of the Customs Union and the government is not drafting any documents. I want to stop the rumors right away". He also requested EUR€20 billion from the European Union "to provide conditions to minimize losses for the Ukrainian economy" in connection with signing the Association Agreement; adding "The government also favors the soonest possible signing of that agreement". European Commission spokesman Olivier Bailly responded (the same day) "We consider that Ukrainian prosperity and Ukrainian future cannot be subjected to a call of tender where the highest bidder will get the price". Former president Viktor Yushchenko weighed in on the economics of Ukrainian-European integration, estimating that adopting European standards should actually cost US$400 million.

Talks with between President Yanukovych and the EU's Catherine Ashton and US Assistant Secretary of State Victoria Nuland continued. After their meeting, Ashton stated that President Yanukovych had promised her he would take steps to resolve the crisis in Ukraine within 24 hours. Meanwhile, Euromaidan's Denys Shevchuk left the roundtable meeting with former presidents Kravchuk, Kuchma, and Yushchenko, claiming, "This is just a fiction".

By the evening, thousands of protesters worked in large groups to shovel snow into sandbags and rebuild barricades, supported by metal railings and other debris. And President Yanukovych released an address to Ukrainians: "I invite representatives of all the political forces, priests, members of the public to a nationwide dialogue. I'm ready to participate in such a round table". (Note: President Yanukovych addressed the opposition specifically "For the sake of compromise I am urging the opposition not to refuse, not to follow the path of confrontation and ultimatums".) The address also stated the government would act "solely within the law and will never use force against peaceful assemblies". But opposition leader Arseniy Yatsenyuk responded there could only be talks once their demands had been met; and according to Vitali Klitschko, the police actions of the night before had "closed off the path to compromise". Klitschko added the next day that if talks (for him this was only possible after the protesters demands had been met) would be held they "should take place with the participation of European representatives and members of civil society".

== 12–16 December 2013 ==
On 12 December, it was reported that in addition to barricades being rebuilt, there was no longer any room for tents to be set up on Maidan.

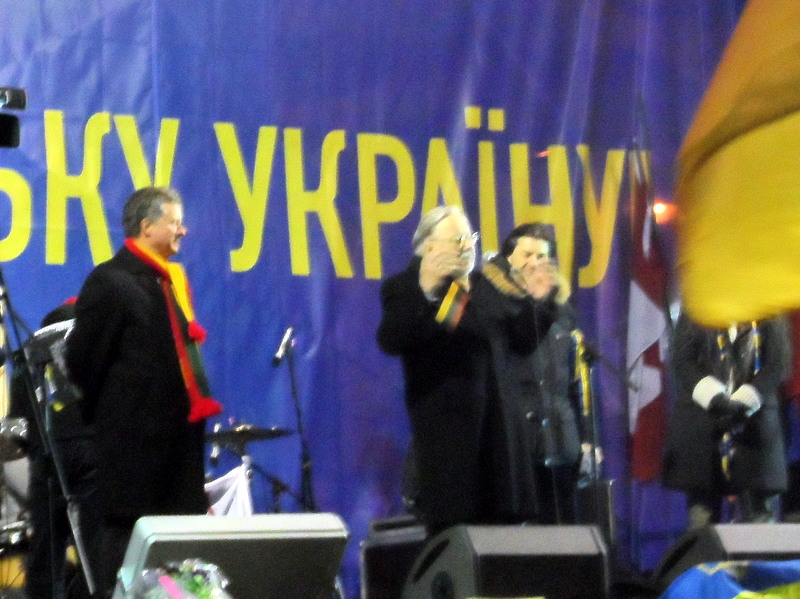
Vytautas Landsbergis, former head of state of Lithuania, addresses the Euromaidan, 21:20, 15 December.

Chief of the Security Service of Ukraine (SBU) Oleksandr Yakymenko invited experts from the Russian Federal Security Service (FSB) to advise in how to disperse of the protests; said Batkivshchyna MP Hennadiy Moskal, who acted as Deputy Chairman of the SBU in 2007. Citing sources within the SBU, he said that recommended was the use of debilitating gases and aerosols. Later, Russian liberal-democratic politician Boris Nemtsov was barred entry into the country by border services. Over 10,000 remained in Maidan overnight.

A roundtable discussion was held on 13 December involving the president, three leaders of the opposition, representatives of the government, parliament, clergy and civil society. There was no live broadcast on any national channel, and the live stream of two TV channels was disrupted when opposition leaders spoke. Following the roundtable, former president Kravchuk blasted the blackout of the broadcast, saying "I organized the roundtable. It is outrageous that they turned it off. It is outrageous when the left hand doesn't know what the right hand is doing." Controversially, it was uncovered that Dmytro Levin, who claimed to represent a student organization involved in Euromaidan, is actually a member of Young Regions, the youth wing of the pro-presidential Party of Regions. The real student leaders of Euromaidan said they were not invited to take part in the discussion, and Levin's statements (which included claims of being "used" by opposition politicians) were said to be uncharacteristic for the real leaders of the student strikes, such as stopping repressions against students and dismissal of Education Minister Dmytro Tabachnyk. During the roundtable President Yanukovych proposed an amnesty for detained demonstrators. After the talks Klitschko stated "Not a single step was made to meet the opposition, I have the impression that the authorities today did not listen to a single one of the demands of the opposition". A Ukrainian court did free nine people arrested on 30 November on 13 December. Also that day, and after his delegation had talked to European Commissioner Štefan Füle, First Deputy Prime Minister Serhiy Arbuzov stated Ukraine will "soon sign" an agreement on closer ties with the European Union (during an interview with Euronews). However, in relation to this Prime Minister Azarov defended the decision to hold off on signing the Association Agreement, saying had Ukraine "signed an association agreement with the European Union at current conditions, this would have inevitably led to its economy's collapse". The previous day, Azarov suggested postponing the deadline for the entry into force of certain provisions of the agreement on a free trade area with the EU, which EU officials rejected.

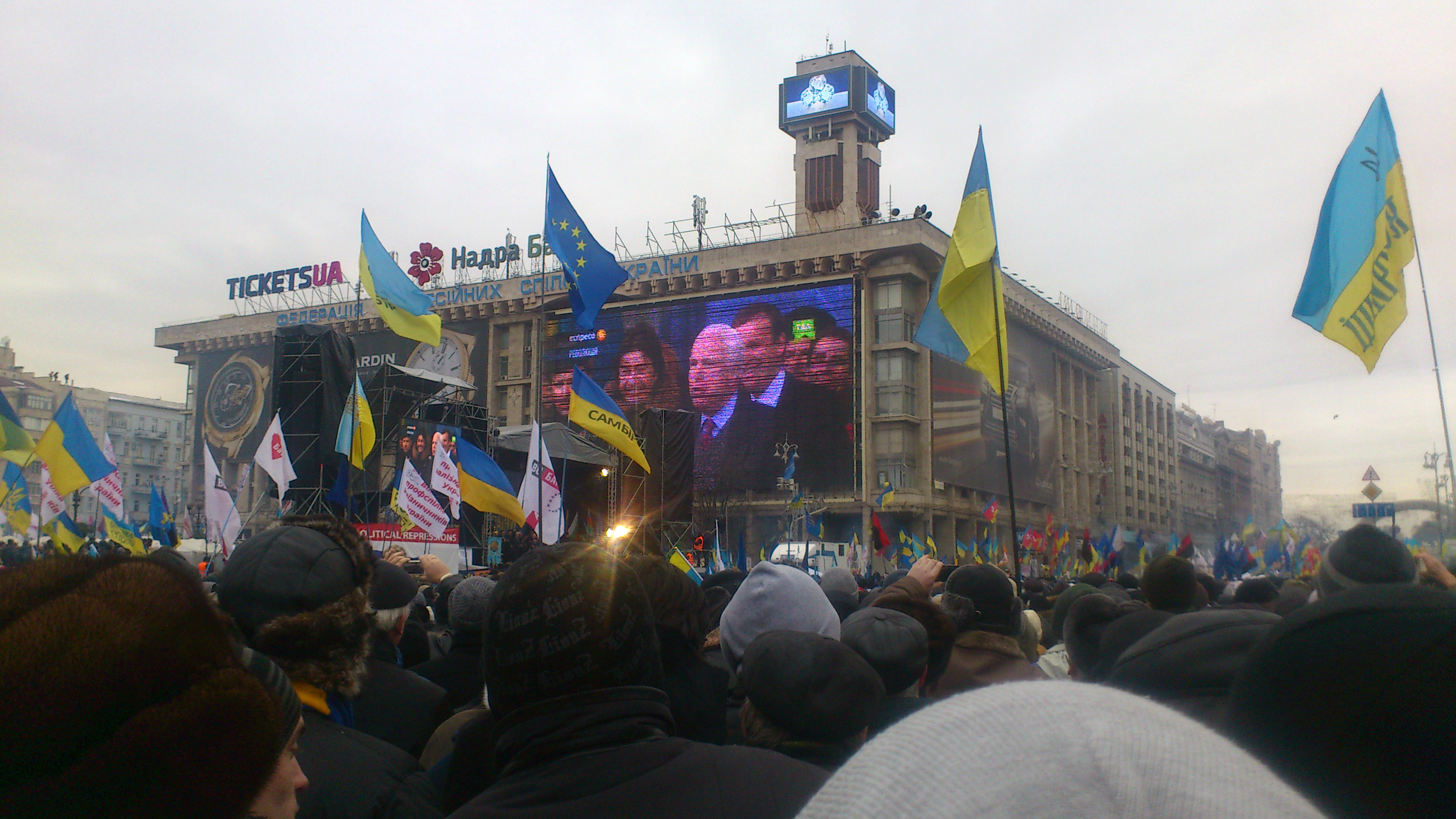
U.S. Senator John McCain addresses crowds in Kyiv, 15 December.

On 14 December President Yanukovych suspended the Head of Kyiv City Administration Oleksandr Popov, Deputy Secretary of the National Security and Defense Council of Ukraine Volodymyr Sivkovych. Later the same day the General Prosecutor of Ukraine's Office handed "a notification on suspicion of abuse of power when ordering the police actions of 30 November 2013" out to Sivkovych and Popov; and to former Head of Kyiv police Valeriy Koriak and his Deputy Head Petro Fedchuk. According to Prosecutor General of Ukraine Viktor Pshonka "All four officials will soon be placed under home arrest". The previous day opposition leader Yatsenyuk had stated during the roundtable discussion "Those who made illegal orders, and those who executed them, must be held to account, for the whole country to see. Those who have been arrested as activists of the Maidan must be released – That is all". Meanwhile, on Maidan, popular Ukrainian rock band Okean Elzy performed to "possibly hundreds of thousands of Ukrainians," and estimates for the day placed over 200,000 in Kyiv to support the movement.

The size of the protest held at 200,000 the following day, according to Interfax. U.S. senators Chris Murphy (D-CT) and John McCain (R-AZ) addressed the crowds, expressing American support for their cause. EU Enlargement Commissioner Štefan Füle said the EU is stopping talks on the Association Agreement because of the Yanukovych administration's unreasonable demands, of which Ukrainian authorities have sought $27 billion in aid to sign. In a tweet issued by Füle, he said there was a divergence between the words and deeds of the president and government regarding the Association agreement, and that "their arguments have no grounds in reality."

== 17 December 2013 Ukrainian–Russian action plan ==
Russian President Vladimir Putin and Ukrainian President Viktor Yanukovych held the sixth "interstate consultation" on 17 December in Moscow, where they signed the 17 December 2013 Ukrainian–Russian action plan. This consisted of the Russian National Wealth Fund buying $15 billion of Ukrainian Eurobonds and the cost of Russian natural gas supplied to Ukraine lowered to $268 per 1,000 cubic metres (this price was $400). As part of the action plan, Russia committed itself to the restoration of its customs regulations on imports from Ukraine that had existed before mid-August 2013. According to President Putin and Russian presidential press secretary Dmitry Peskov this deal was "not tied to any conditions" and Ukraine's possible accession to the Customs Union of Belarus, Kazakhstan, and Russia was not addressed. Peskov also added "it is our principled position not to interfere in Ukraine's affairs" and accused other countries of doing the opposite. According to President Yanukovych the trade situation between Russia and Ukraine required urgent intervention, and that it should be coordinated with other Commonwealth of Independent States (CIS) countries. He also added referring to Russia–Ukraine relations, "We'll have to learn lessons for the future and not to repeat such mistakes". And President Yanukovych also stated that Ukraine and Russia should strengthen cross-border and inter-regional cooperation "which create convenient conditions for the people".

In response to the agreement, the opposition parties blocked parliament in order to defer its ratification since they quickly denounced the plan. And approximately 50,000 continued their protest on Maidan Nezalezhnosti. Where opposition leader Vitaly Klitschko told the crowd "He [President Yanukovich] has given up Ukraine's national interests, given up independence and prospects for a better life for every Ukrainian". The opposition leaders vowed to continue their protests, if necessary through New Year and Orthodox Christmas (celebrated on 7 January annually), they repeated their demands for the firing of the second Azarov Government, early presidential and parliamentary elections.

Also on 17 December, UDAR issued a statement regarding an alleged attempt on leader Vitali Klitschko's life. According to the party in a statement to western diplomats, when Klitschko's private jet was attempting landing at Boryspol airport on 24 November, the plane was denied landing at an altitude of 100m, and a visual clearance of 50m. They allege this was an attempt to repeat an accident similar to the 2010 Polish Air Force Tu-154 crash.

== 18–31 December 2013 ==
On 18 December Prime Minister Mykola Azarov stated that without the deal with Russia "bankruptcy and social collapse would have awaited Ukraine". He also added that there was no way Ukraine could have signed the EU Association Agreement as Ukraine would have had to accept unfeasibly stringent IMF conditions for economic reform. The protest on Maidan Nezalezhnosti continued on 18 December 2013.

On 19 December President Viktor Yanukovych stated "We have decided to pause [on the Association Agreement] to work out on what kind of conditions should be in place for us to sign the Free Trade Zone Agreement [a part of the Association Agreement]. And this answer should be found by the government. There isn't any contradiction about Ukraine's course on the [EU] integration issue. Generally, this is not about the integration, this is about economical relations". Although he added "If we talk about the work on the free trade agreement [a part of the EU Association Agreement], this will take us some time, and we still have a lot of uncertainties. Surely, we should see how this will benefit us in the short term, midterm, and long term". He also added that Ukraine may combine the EU Association Agreement with observer status in the Customs Union of Belarus, Kazakhstan, and Russia and the Eurasian Economic Union. And that Ukraine expects to be granted observer status in the Eurasian Economic Union, "As concerns the Eurasian Union, we filed a written bid in Astana in August this year to consider Ukraine's participation in the Eurasian Union as an observer". The same day Polish Foreign Minister Radosław Sikorski stated "I do not know any formal facts that should say that it is impossible to sign the association agreement between Ukraine and the European Union". Meanwhile, Russian President Vladimir Putin commented on 17 December deal between Russia and Ukraine (which he described as an "act of brotherly love"): "This is not at all linked to (protests at) Maidan, nor with the EU-talks that Ukraine leads... We're just seeing that Ukraine is in dire straits and we should support her".

On 20 December high-ranking EU-officials stated that the EU is still ready to sign the Association Agreement "as soon as Ukraine is ready for it", that this agreement was also beneficial for Russia and that the EU "is totally not concerned about the fact that Ukraine is signing agreements with Russia". On 20 December 2013 Prosvita building in Kharkiv was thrashed by unknown.

On 21 December, Volodymyr Maralov, a member of the activist anti-corruption group Road Control was shot and his car burned at approximately 11 p.m. on Shevchenko Square in Kyiv while being attacked by two men and one accomplice. According to the surgeon who removed the bullet, it was within 6 inches of his heart. The group claims the attack was part of an ongoing effort by officials to stop the organization's reporting on police corruption. The assailants allegedly demanded Maralov expose the whereabouts of a group member who received political asylum in the United States in November, and for the location of incriminating data. Earlier this month, Road Control journalist Andriy Dzyndzya and his lawyer Viktor Smaliy were remanded into custody for two months; Dzyndzya is accused of stealing keys to a front-end loader that was used on 1 December riots, his lawyer is accused of attacking a judge.

On 22 December, the fifth ongoing week of the protests, 100,000 rallied in Kyiv. During this day major opposition parties and non-partisans established a nationwide political movement called Maidan People's Union. And Klitschko told the crowds "We won't leave this place in any case. I'm inviting you to stand and celebrate the New Year here, on the Maidan".

On 23 December 2013 Russian presidential aide Yuri Ushakov stated "there is no contradiction" in Ukraine's association with the EU and their observer status in the Customs Union of Belarus, Kazakhstan, and Russia and the Eurasian Economic Union.

On 24 December 2013 an armed assault was conducted in downtown of Kharkiv on co-organizer of protest in Kharkiv Dmytro Pylypets. He received 12 stab wounds.

In the early morning of 25 December Tetiana Chornovol, a well known Ukrayinska Pravda journalist, Euromaidan social-activist, and Batkivshchyna party member was brutally assaulted near Boryspil International Airport. (Note: The driver of the car was later arrested, who then after police questioning identified the two other attackers, one of which was arrested. In total five suspected attackers have been detained by the Ukrainian police.) Euromaidan activists called for a picketing of the Ministry of Internal Affairs at 8 am, in which hundreds attended, calling for Minister of Internal Affairs Vitaliy Zakharchenko's resignation. Chornovol was hospitalized with a broken nose, a concussion and multiple bruises. Opposition parties accused the authorities of being behind the attacks, while a statement from Olena Bondarenko of the Party of Regions categorized the attack as spontaneous violence caused by Euromaidan, and blamed the opposition.

On 27 December a law (drafted by the second Azarov Government) introduced criminal liability for the seizure of buildings "which leads to the disruption of their normal operation" in the Criminal Code of Ukraine.

On 29 December, re-energised by 25 December attack on Chornovol, tens of thousands gathered again in Kyiv. About 200 cars packed with protesters joined by over a thousand protesters marched on President Yanukovych's Mezhyhirya residence 10 kilometres outside Kyiv's outskirts.

== 1–15 January 2014 ==
On New Year's Eve, 200,000 attended Euromaidan to jointly celebrate. On 1 January, 15,000 held a torchlight march through Kyiv in support of the 105th birthday of Stepan Bandera, a controversial World War II-era nationalist.

On 3 January, after being questioned by police, a Svoboda's MP Andriy Illenko and his lawyer Sydir Kizin were attacked and brutally beaten outside of a police station in Kyiv. Both received extensive injuries. According to Svoboda, Illyenko was primarily diagnosed with a broken jaw and treated for a concussion; according to police, a broken nose. The attack occurred after the members of Svoboda came out of the Shevchenkivskyy's police station. The party called the attack an 'attempted murder'.

According to Batkivschyna MP Arsen Avakov (on 9 January 2014) recently the protesters in Kyiv had experienced regular power cuts; to prevent this oppositions MPs did have five meetings with Kyiv city authorities and electricity suppliers and installed back-up generators. According to Avakov there had been no difficulties with taking rubbish out of Maidan Nezalezhnosti and taking wood into the square.

On 10 January, Berkut riot police clashed with protesters near Kyiv-Sviatoshyn Raion district court in Sviatoshyn neighborhood of Kyiv, where guilty verdicts against the so-called "Vasylkiv terrorists" were announced. The Patriot of Ukraine group members were given 6-year sentences for 'trying to blow up a non-existent Vladimir Lenin statue' (a local city council already dismantled the Lenin monument before the alleged plot was discovered); critics called the court proceedings a sham. After the court verdict was announced, protesters (more than 100) decided to block the prisoner transport bus, after which hundreds of riot police were dispatched, who used tear gas and batons. More than a dozen people got injured, some of them seriously, with reports of multiple broken hands and legs, as well as head injuries. Opposition leader Yuri Lutsenko was among the injured, photographed with bloody head wounds and knocked unconscious before being taken to a hospital for intensive care. A witness account stated that police targeted Lutsenko, dragging him into a bus where he was beaten. Three members of the Svoboda Party were also injured; as well as two photojournalists, whose camera equipment was broken by police. European Union and American officials condemned the attack, with US Ambassador to Ukraine Geoffrey Pyatt saying "Lutsenko will be remembered as hero of EuroMaidan" for trying to intervene in the confrontation between police and protesters. The three opposition party leaders (Klitschko, Yatseniuk, and Tyahnybok) issued a joint statement condemning the assault, categorizing it as attempted murder.

On 12 January, the protests numbered 10,000–50,000 people were held on Maidan Nezalezhnosti.

On 15 January, courts banned protests and public assembly in Kyiv once again. This led the opposition to believe that the following night ("and the next ones") Maidan Nezalezhnosti would be cleared by Berkut special police units.

== 16 January 2014 anti-protest laws ==
On 16 January the MPs from Party of Regions and Communist Party of Ukraine (and a number of independent MPs) in the Ukrainian parliament passed anti-protest laws (the texts of some of them became available after MPs had voted for them) which criminalized all of the Euromaidan opposition's methods employed during protests. The laws introduced 10-year jail terms for blockading government buildings; hefty fines and prison terms for protesters who wear face masks and helmets; fines and prison terms for unauthorized installation of and provision of facilities or equipment for tents, stages or amplifiers in public places; and driving bans for people who form convoys of more than five cars. Also approved was legislation to easier strip members of parliament of immunity (Note: Party of Regions faction leader Oleksandr Yefremov called on 17 January 2014 for further measures to easier strip members of parliament of immunity "I believe we should remove an MPs immunity from prosecution. I'd vote for that, because members of parliament are able to hide behind this immunity and act like heros. If this immunity was removed these heros would soon become afraid".); the identification of members of non-government organisations funded by foreign governments or foundations as "foreign agents"; 2-year jail terms for defamation spread through social media; 1-year jail terms of corrective labour for slandering government officials; mandatory registration for internet-based media and prepaid mobile phone services purchasers. According to the Financial Times, the 11 new laws were approved while opposition lawmakers were occupying the main session hall and voted in by MPs by means of show of hands that "were too rapid to actually be counted, and in some cases done in five seconds. The opposition dubbed the day in parliament 'Black Thursday' and stated that, "Today Ukrainian parliamentarianism is dead", and that the laws have ensured "dictatorship where there is no right to assemble, to reason, to live, where there is no law, no civil rights, and no legal process". The Party of Regions faction noted that the opposition had prevented normal voting since members of opposition factions had taken away voting cards from their colleagues in parliament. Party of the Regions MP Oleh Tsariov stated the laws were aimed to prevent further escalation of the ongoing political crisis. The OSCE called on President Yanukovych to veto the legislation "which might be arbitrarily interpreted and lead to disproportionate restrictions on media freedom, stifling debate and critical views". (Note: President of the European Parliament Martin Schulz also urged President Yanukovych not to sign the laws and stated "If they become law, they would push Ukraine back towards its authoritarian, Soviet past". Freedom House did too urge President Yanukovych not to sign the laws; it stated "Freedom House strongly condemns the approval by Ukraine's Rada (parliament) of legislation that criminalizes libel, imposes Russian-style 'foreign agent' restrictions on civil society groups receiving foreign funding, and punishes civic participation in protests".) In reaction on 16 January votes EU Commissioner for Enlargement and European Neighbourhood Policy Štefan Füle stated he was "deeply disappointed to see such a turn from the European path of Ukraine" and he believed the laws were aimed at limiting partnership with the civil society. EU High Representative for Foreign Affairs and Security Policy Catherine Ashton criticism (among others) was "The changes that seem to seriously curtail the activities of civil society organizations in Ukraine and simplify procedures for revocation of mandates of members of parliament are equally worrying". And she added "I call on the President of Ukraine to ensure that these decisions are revised and brought in line with Ukraine's international commitments". German Foreign Minister Frank-Walter Steinmeier reaction on the laws was "The limitation of civil rights will lead Ukraine only further away from Europe". The United States Department of State expressed deep concern: "Both the process and the substance of the Rada's actions today cast serious doubt on Ukraine's commitment to democratic norms". In response to foreign criticism Ukrainian Foreign Minister Leonid Kozhara urged foreign diplomats "to avoid making unilateral statements and remarks that do not reflect the real state of affairs". He also noted that the laws adopted by the Ukrainian parliament on 16 January already exist in the laws of most European countries and meet generally accepted democratic standards and international practices.

The following day, president Yanukovych signed the bills into law and dismissed Hennadiy Vorobiev as commander of the Ukrainian Ground Forces. Presidential chief of staff Serhiy Lyovochkin resigned from his post in protest of the laws, as well as presidential spokeswoman Daria Chepak. In accordance with enforcing the new anti-social laws, Interior Minister Zakharchenko pledged that "each offence will be met by our side harshly."

== 19–27 January 2014 ==
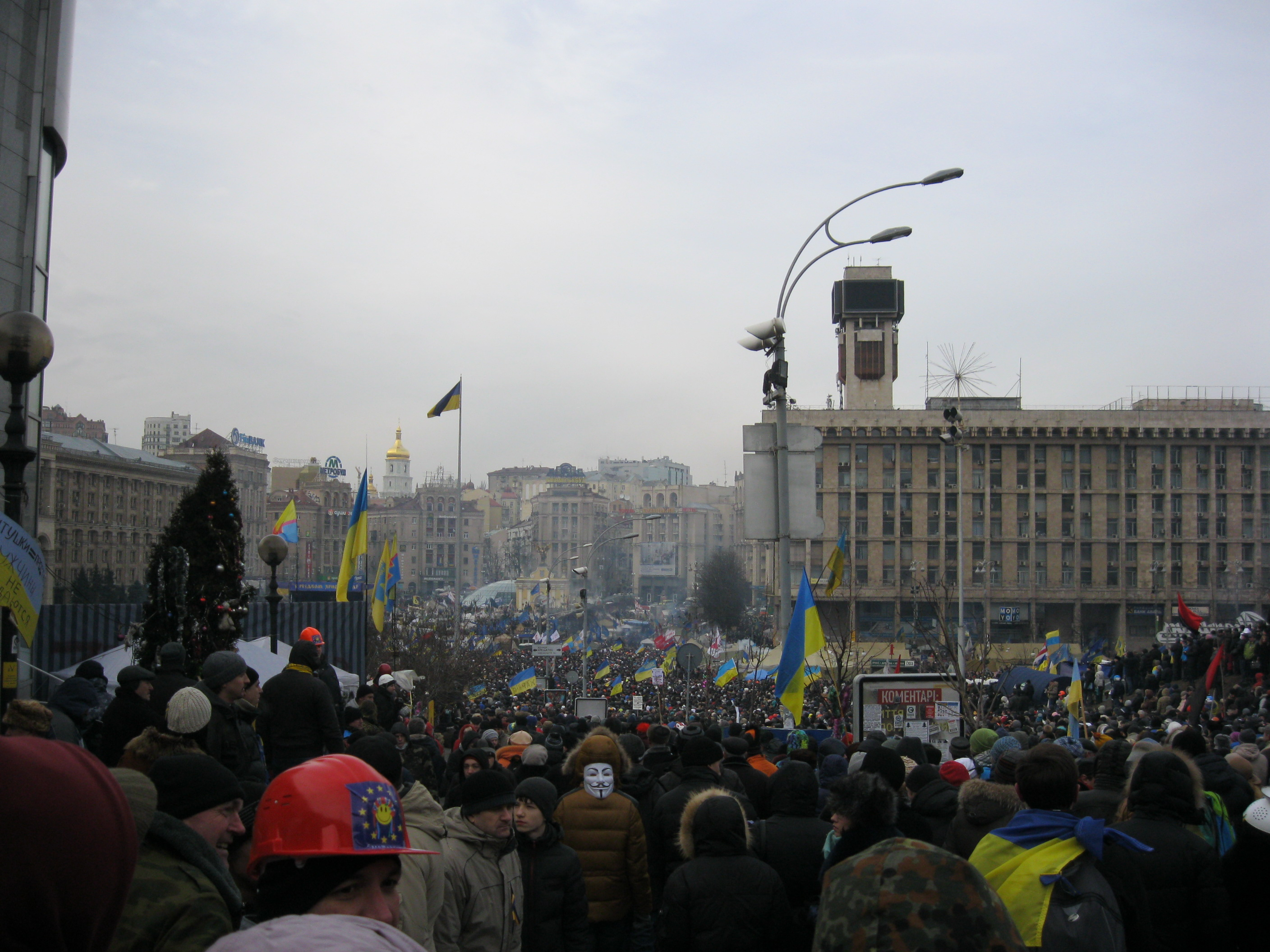
200,000 activists protest against the anti-protest laws on 19 January in Kyiv

On 19 January, Sunday mass protest, the ninth in a row, took place gathering up to 200,000 in central Kyiv to protest the new anti-protest laws, dubbed the "Dictatorship laws". The rally was attended by opposition leaders, but was also the first public appearance of Tetiana Chornovol since her alleged attack by the authorities. Many protesters defied the face concealment ban by donning party masks, while others wore hard hats and gas masks. AutoMaidan leader Dmytro Bulatov demanded a single oppositional candidate be named, and the crowd also chanted against leaders to comply with this action. Batkivshchyna leaders Arseniy Yatsenyuk and Oleksandr Turchynov declared that a new, alternative parliament would be created.

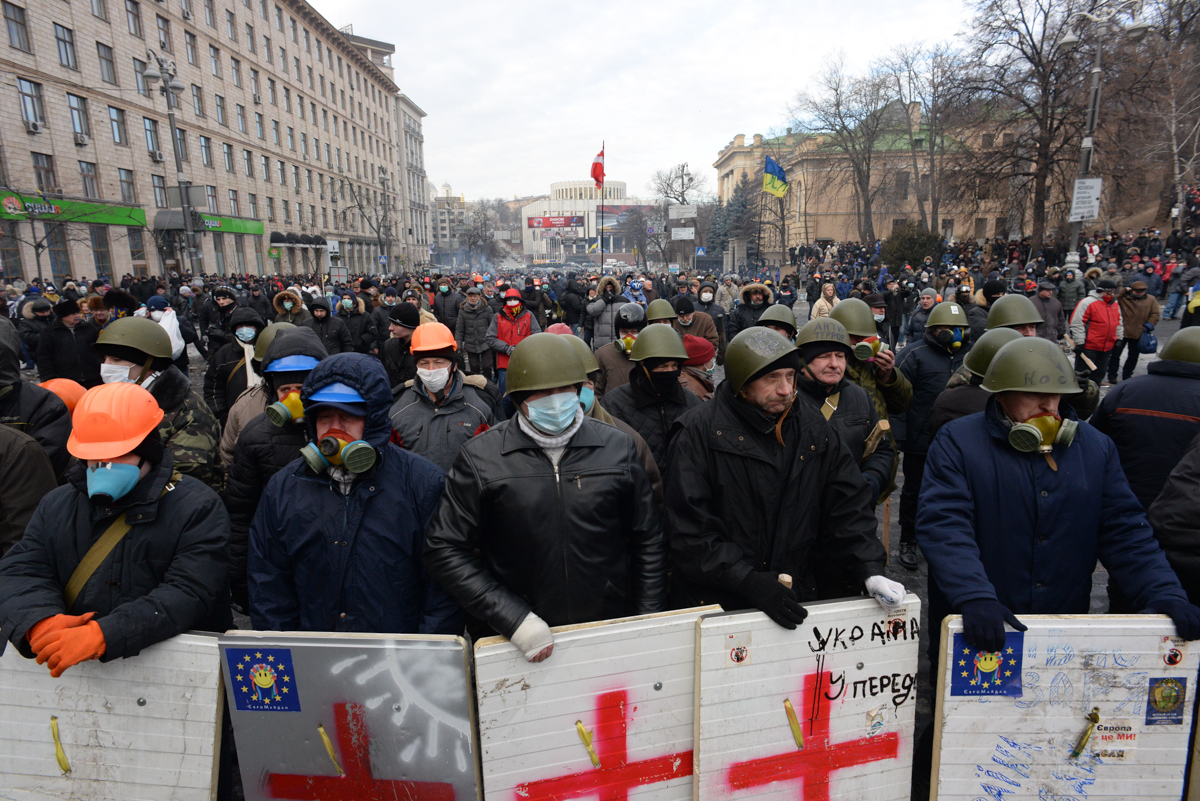
Helmeted protesters face off with police

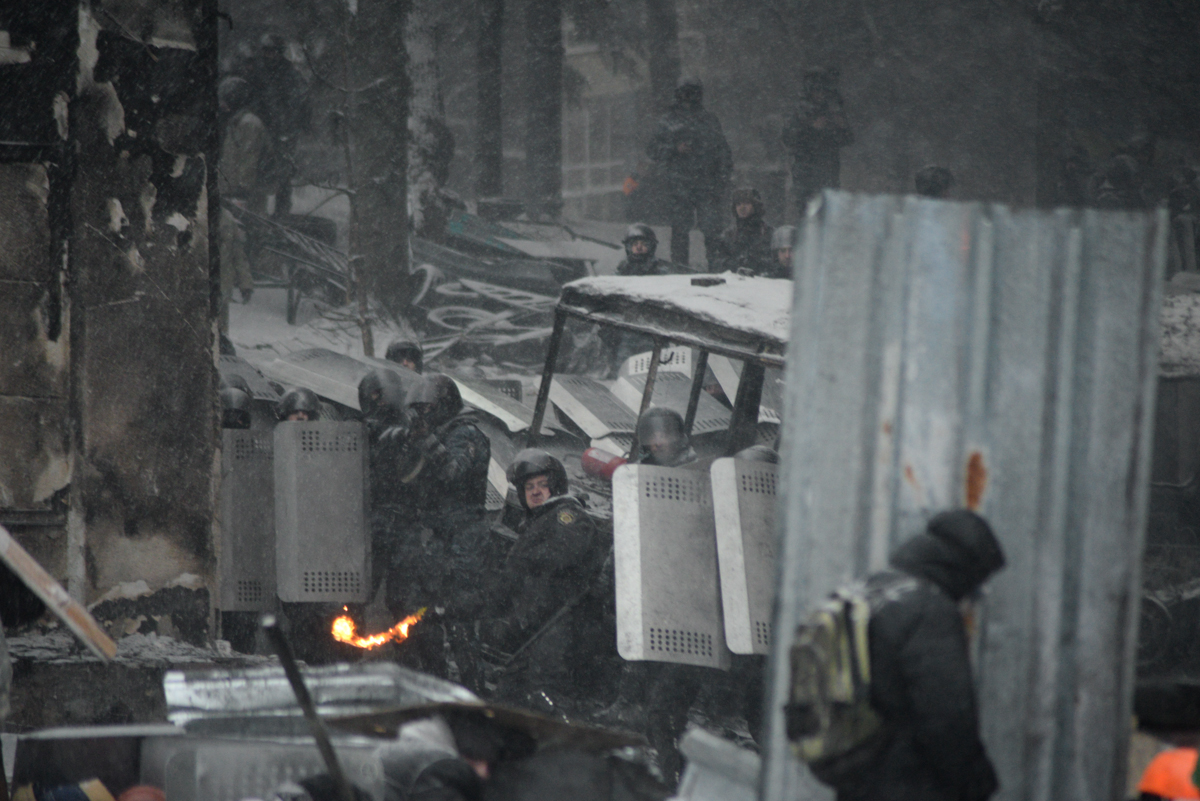
Photo of police using shotguns and throwing molotov cocktail (unauthorized) in the crowd (22 January)

Euromaidan activists, including former Ukrainian Navy chief, Rear Admiral Ihor Tenyukh, appealed to the military for its "solemn allegiance to the Ukrainian people" rather than the "criminal regime", and for members of the military and police to not carry out criminal orders, namely in the use of force against civilians; they assured those who would be fired for refusing orders of violence would be reinstated once a new government for Ukraine is installed.

Clashes erupted as thousands descended upon parliament via Hrusehvskoho Street, and were met by police cordons, and a blockade of military cars, mini-vans and buses. The protests escalated into riots and clashes with police erupted. The riots on Hrushevskoho Street have been ongoing from 19–21 January and have involved both Euromaidan activists and opposition leadership.

Between 21–22 January, 3 were killed during the Hrushevskoho Street riots. On 21 January, the first death occurred after a 22-year-old man fell from atop the 13-metre high colonnade in front of Dynamo Stadium while confronted by Berkut police, and suffered fractures to his spine's cervical vertebrae. Reports of the incident debate on whether the man jumped from the building to flee the beating, fell, or if he was pushed by police. The second death occurred at 6 a.m. on 22 January, where police shot and killed a protester climbing the barricades in the conflict zone. It was reported he received 4 gunshot wounds, including to the head, and died immediately on the scene before being taken to hospital. The third, a Belarusian man, was also shot dead by police. Clashes spread to Lutheran Street near the Presidential Administration, with protesters lobbing molotov cocktails.

Danger arose when it appeared that activists who sought treatment at hospitals were 'disappearing'. Prominent Euromaidan activists Ihor Lutsenko and Yuriy Verbytsky were abducted by five unknown men on 21 January at 4 a.m. from Oleksandrivska Hospital in Kyiv. Lutsenko was found beaten in the woods the next day, but Verbytsky was murdered; his body found on 22 January.

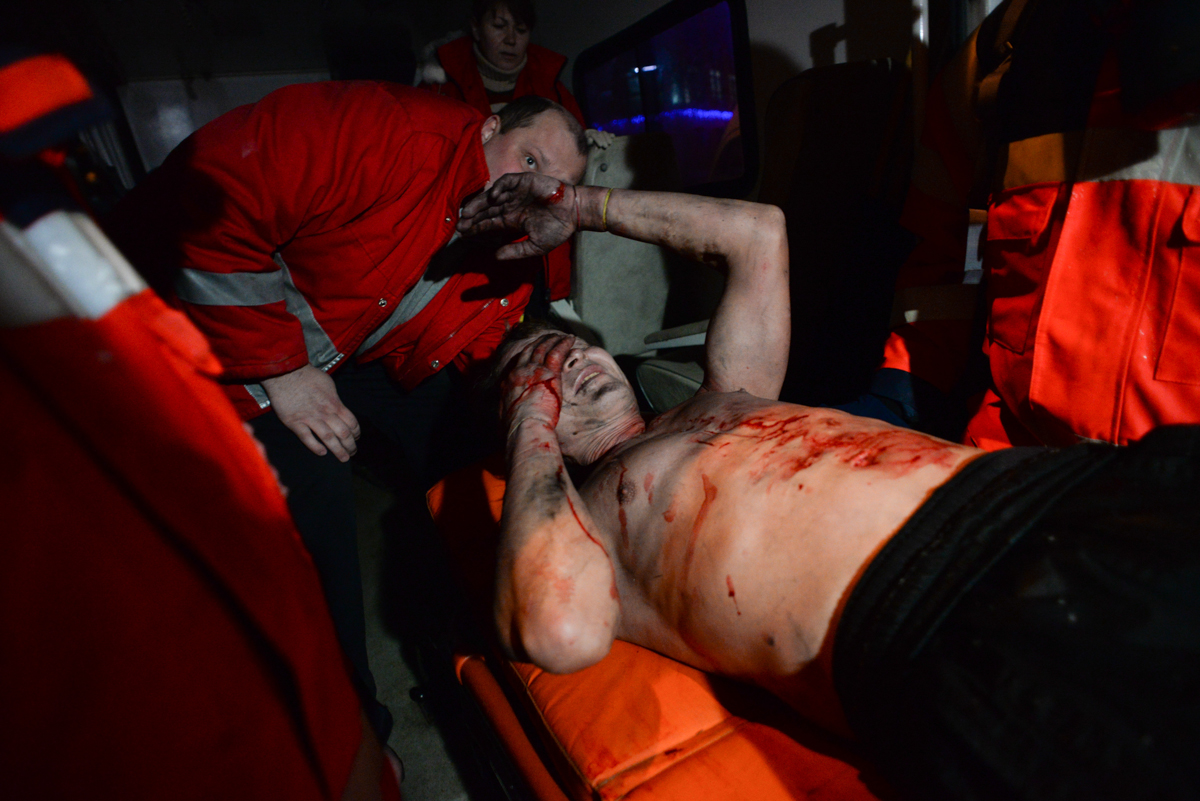
An injured protester is treated on the scene

In response to the escalating violence, police were permitted by the government to increase measures in stopping the riots and protests. Police were now able to block roads to restrict access to the city, and allowed the use of water cannons against rioters regardless of air temperature, which was −10 C at the time of the announcement. Despite this, some 50,000 came to Euromaidan to show support. Tanks were reported to be traveling via rail from Chernihiv to Kyiv, but government sources claimed they were headed instead to Odesa. Police also illegally published the names and addresses of all known AutoMaidan activists.

On 22 January the president presented a number of medals to various figures in the police forces and military for their service in the conflict. Controversially, President Yanukovych attempted to present Ukrainian Orthodox Church Patriarch Filaret with an award, which was refused.

Opposition leaders presented the president with a 24-hour window to give in to demands. Vitali Klitschko warned the government that protesters would "go on the attack" if their demands were not met by the next day, while Yatseniuk stated, "Tomorrow we go forward together. If a bullet in the forehead, then bullet in the forehead." Following this sentiment, the UNA-UNSO called on all gun-owning Ukrainians to arm themselves to defend the Maidan.

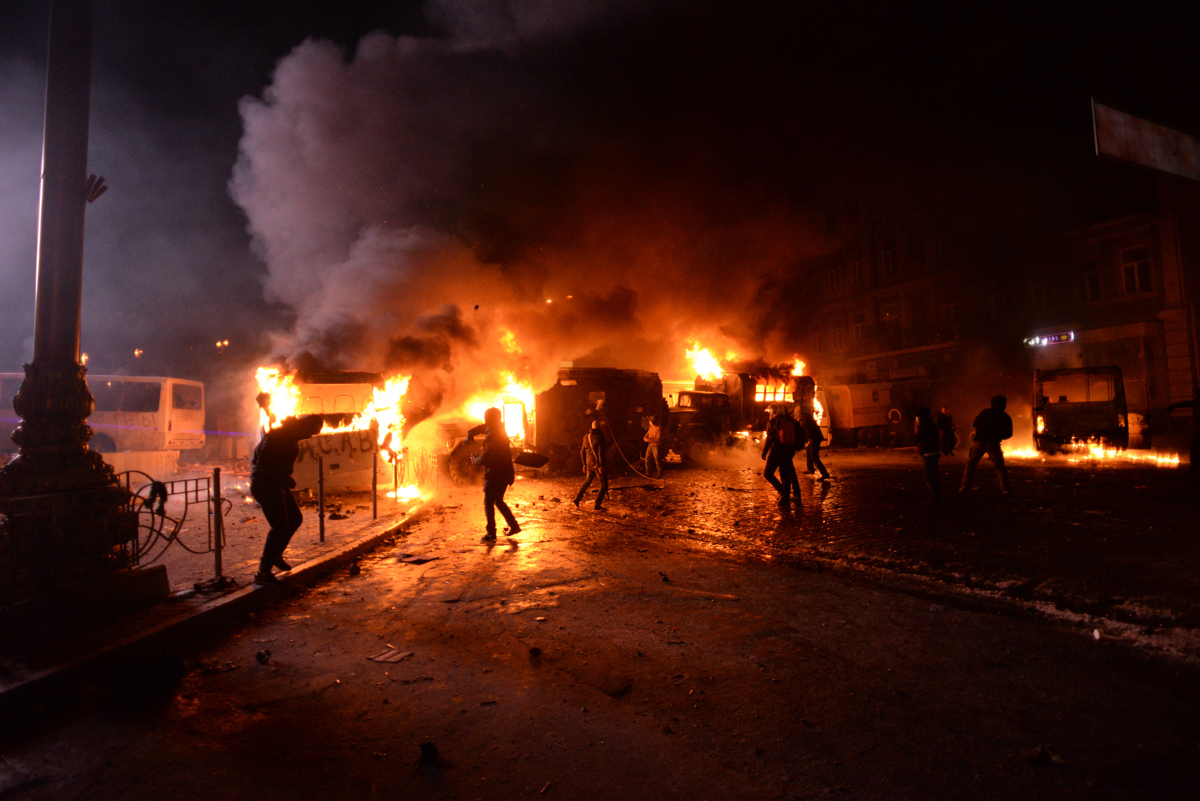
Radically oriented protesters throwing Molotov cocktails in direction of Interior troops positions.

On 22 January suddenly at least three tanks were deployed from Chernihiv. Officially the tanks were being transferred to the Odesa Oblast and not be going to Kyiv. On 23 January it was announced that due to the complicated situation in the country all tanks were returned to their place of permanent base.

Two dozen men in masks armed with batons stormed the TV Kyiv station at 7:00 p.m. Later, several thousand protestors from the anti-Euromaidan group "Kyivans for a Clean City" surrounded the U.S. Embassy in Kyiv. Crowd leader Ivan Protsenko blamed American financing and interference for the events in Kyiv, and picketers then egged the embassy. Later, a number of these embassy picketers engaged in an altercation with promoters after they were not paid for their time and participation in the picket.

In the early morning of 23 January, police raided and destroyed a Red Cross Euromaidan medical center. Carrying on from the previous night, it was reported by activist groups that television blackouts were taking place across the country to channels which carried Euromaidan coverage, and internet and social media blocks were also under way. Riot police from Vinnytsia refused their orders to be deployed to Kyiv after reports from activists indicated that police and military were being mobilized nationwide. AutoMaidan activists were attacked and beaten in Mariinskyi Park, and detained by police; 9–10 vehicles had their windows smashed or tires blown. Ruslana called the attack "a carefully planned ambush."

At interview to BBC (Davos, Switzerland), the Prime Minister of Ukraine Mykola Azarov assured that Berkut was not able to use fire arms. Police also brought a water cannon, while outside temperatures were below freezing.

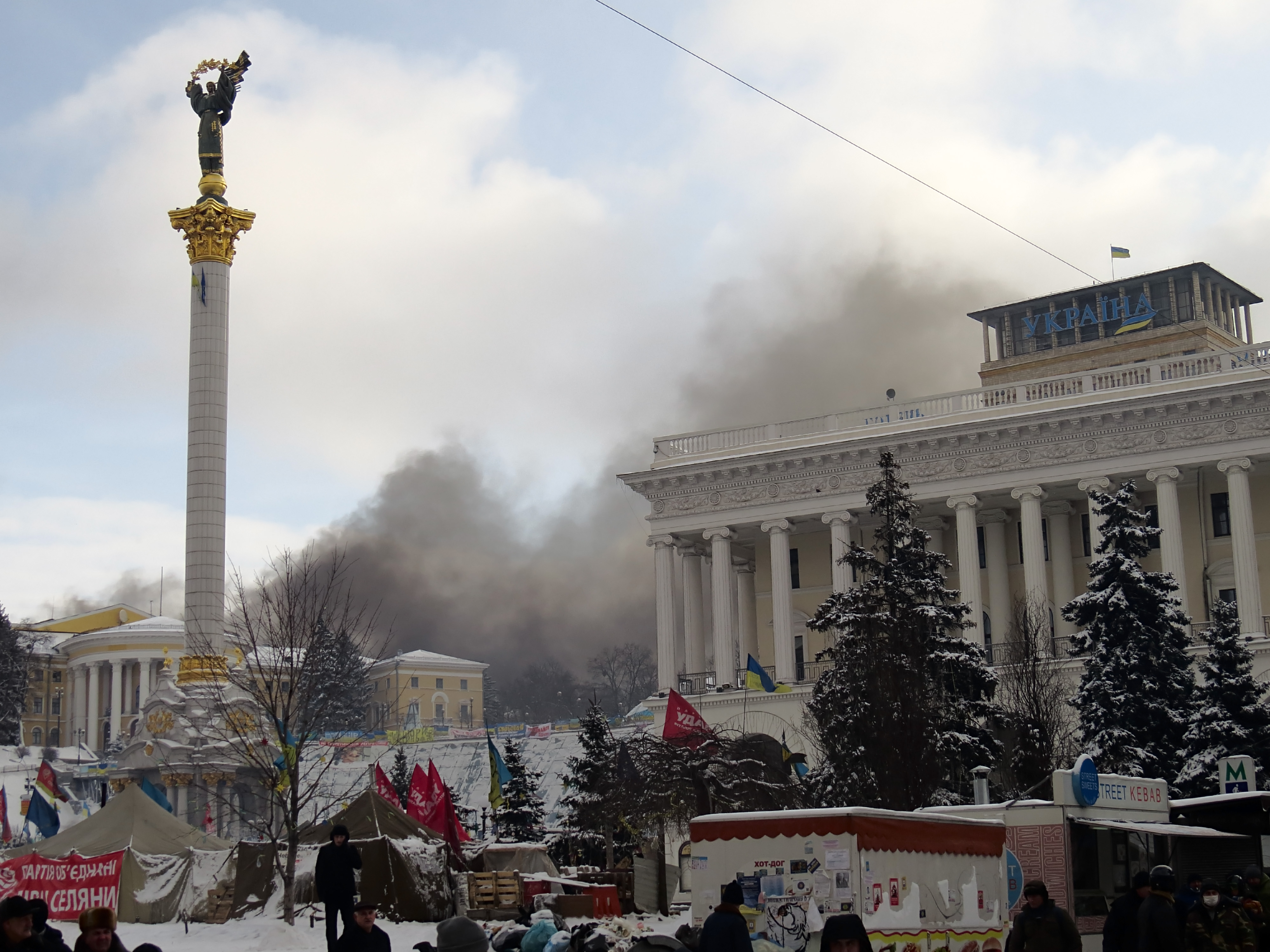
Smoke from Hrushevskoho street as seen from Maidan Nezalezhnosti

Euromaidan activists documented police brutality on multiple occasions from Berkut and servicemen of the Internal Troops of Ukraine, wherein officers assaulted activists and even random people and would humiliate them using excessive foul language, and force them to undress naked. In a video leaked to YouTube, Interior Ministry troops tortured and humiliated a Euromaidan activist in Kyiv's Pechersk region; where he was stripped naked in the cold after being beaten, and photographed by officers. The video was in close proximity, leaked by an officer in an apparent sign of self-evident barbarism and hatred within police ranks. BBC News interviewed another protester who was photographing the Hrushevskoho Street riots, and then beaten and stabbed by police.

On 23 January reports surfaced that riot police were engaging in the use of improvised grenades, taping nails and other shrapnel to conventional stun grenades.

On 23 January 2014 Berkut grabbed a 22-year-old volunteer of Euromaidan medical service (native of Donetsk), confiscated all her identification documents, took her out of the city and left her out in a woodline near Vyshhorod.

On 23 January it was reported that, according to the wife of an active Berkut officer, troops were being ordered to evacuate their families from the city. FC Dynamo Kyiv updated their Facebook page with a red-and-black tryzub as a sign of support for the revolution. FC Shakhtar Donetsk fans then also threw their support behind the Euromaidan movement.

On 23 January 2014 soldiers of the Internal Troops of Ukraine (VV) were awarded with medals bearing the title "National honor to military law enforcement servicemen", a medal that is in fact not in the official list of state awards. Awards were given out to military units of the Eastern Territorial Command (STK) #3057 (Mariupol) and #3037 (Donetsk).

On 24 January President Yanukovych stated (at a meeting with religious leaders) that the dubbed "Dictatorship laws" would be amended, saying that "we will prepare and compromise solutions together with the opposition. We will vote for amending these laws and so will settle all issues". At the same meeting he also stated that "we will continue a dialogue with the opposition leaders" and "I will be doing all I can to stop this conflict and stop violence. If we can do this on a good note, let's leave it on a good note, and if we can't, we'll use all legitimate methods". Also on 24 January Interior Minister Vitaliy Zakharchenko guaranteed "that the police will not take forceful action to clear Maidan Nezalezhnosti".

On 25 January 2014 at 00:40 (EET) the Ministry of Internal Affairs (MVS) accused the security of Euromaidan in assault on three police officers. In its press-release, the MVS claims that the so-called Maidan security attacked three officers who were on duty. One of them was immediately struck with a knife. The detained servicemen were held in the city hall. Now the wounded one has been freed and hospitalized, while the fate of the other two is unknown. MVS claimed that a policeman who was walking home in civilian clothing was killed by a shot in his head. The same day Interior Minister Vitaliy Zakharchenko claimed "According to information received by law enforces, firearms being piled up at House of Trade Unions and Kyiv City State Administration" and "The opposition leaders don't want to disassociate themselves from radical forces, but are no longer capable of controlling them, exposing Ukrainians to danger". The opposition denied that its activists had captured policemen and called the Interior Ministry's statement provocative. It also denied piling up firearms and did accuse the authorities of setting up "a criminal group purposefully formed by the authorities to conduct destructive actions on the Maidan". Later on 25 January Zakharchenko stated that protesters had freed 2 captive policemen, "Captive policemen have been tortured and now are hospitalized". Vitaliy Zakharchenko stated that the highest degree of extremism could be found in Kyiv.

A third meeting since the start of the Hrushevskoho Street riots between President Yanukovych and the three main opposition leaders Yatseniuk, Klitschko and Tiahnybok took place on 25 January as requested by the All-Ukraine Council of Churches and Religious Organizations. During the meeting President Yanukovych offered the position of Prime Minister of Ukraine to Arseniy Yatsenyuk and the position of Vice Prime Minister of Ukraine in charge of humanitarian affairs to Vitali Klitschko. The government also offered an amnesty for protesters who agree to release administration buildings they have seized. During the meeting President Yanukovych also promised to consider changes to the Ukrainian constitution (which currently gives the President of Ukraine extensive powers) either through a referendum or through legislation by the forming of a working group containing all parties in Ukraine's parliament to discuss returning to the constitution as it was between 2004 and 2010, under which parliament had significantly more powers than currently. According to Justice Minister Olena Lukash President Yanukovych would dismiss the second Azarov Government if Yatsenyuk accepted the Prime Minister post. Nevertheless, Yatsenyuk told a large crowd on Maidan Nezalezhnosti that while the opposition is generally ready to accept leadership of the government, President Yanukovych still had to meet several key demands of the opposition (including early presidential elections) and that talks will continue. At a later news conference, Yatsenyuk said "we are not throwing out the proposal, but we are not accepting it, either. We are conducting serious consultations among three opposition forces". About an hour after the opposition leaders spoke the Hrushevskoho Street riots continued.

Spilna Sprava, a militant splinter of Euromaidan, occupied and later evacuated the Ministry of Justice after Justice Minister Olena Lukash threatened to push for imposing a state of emergency. On 27 January, the Ministry of Defense announced sharp pay raises for military personnel, and the Cabinet of Ministers adopted a secret resolution to increase the size of the Berkut & Gryffon force sixfold to 30,000; they would also be given more power and a reserve fund would be set aside for additional ammunition. The Ministry of Justice then ordered the legalization of vigilante "civic patrols", which would apply to titushky. The government was reportedly planning to close off 30 streets in Kyiv, with the Cabinet preparing to introduce martial law.

== 28 January–5 February 2014 ==
On 28 January, Prime Minister Mykola Azarov tendered his resignation to a special emergency session of the Verhovna Rada called by President Viktor Yanukovych. The President subsequently accepted the resignation and signed a decree dismissing the Cabinet, which decree would not take effect until the Verhovna Rada approved a new Cabinet. Hence the Second Azarov Government continued as a caretaker government. Azarov was replaced by Deputy Prime Minister Serhiy Arbuzov. Hours after resigning, Azarov fled the country to Austria with no intent on returning in the near future.

Oleh Tyahnybok, leader of Svoboda, stated that Mr. Azarov had resigned in the face of a looming no-confidence vote that he was bound to lose. In addition, the Party of Regions joined with opposition deputies to repeal 9 of the 12 anti-protest laws passed on 16 January. Opposition deputies compromised by approving more limited versions of some of the repealed restrictions. For example, a provision for criminalizing the destruction of monuments was reinstated, but was limited only to monuments of fighters against fascism, such as those commemorated in World War II statues. Destruction of statues of Lenin would no longer be a criminal offence.

On 29 January, despite pledging to honor agreements with Ukraine, Russia restarted tight border controls and other restrictions at the border for Ukrainian goods. Russian customs increased duties of 5 to 40 percent on goods.

On 29 January some 23 cars with western Ukrainian license plates were set on fire in Kyiv, and on the 31st, the car of an employee of the Canadian embassy in Ukraine. Taking credit for these acts was a newly formed terrorist group called Red Sector (a play on the name of the right-wing group Right Sector). In a written statement of admission, Red Sector said: "Yes, today we burned many cars of the idiots who came to Kyiv, shat on it and think they are masters. There will be no revolution! We apologize if we damaged the property of normal people. But you have to understand that had it not been for our active deeds, fascists tomorrow will set a tent in your flat because they don't like you. And they don't give a shit about the law."

President Yanukovych went on sick leave on 30 January because (Note: According to the presidential website president.gov.ua.) of respiratory illness and a high fever. According to Rostislav Pavlenko, a member of Klitschko's UDAR party, this was only a tactical move by Yanukovych "It allows Yanukovych not to sign laws, not to meet the opposition, absent himself from decisions to solve the political crisis". (Note: On 30 January 2014 President Yanukovych had not yet signed 28 January 2014 law that annulled the so called anti-protest laws of 16 January 2014.) (Note: Mykhailo Chechetov, from Yanukovych's Party of Regions, had seen president President Yanukovych in parliament on 29 January 2014 and according to him "He looked ill".) On 31 January President Yanukovych signed 28 January 2014 law that annulled the so-called anti-protest laws of 16 January 2014. Yanukovych announced the following day that he would travel to Moscow in a week to meet with Putin.

Later on the 30th, AutoMaidan leader Dmytro Bulatov was found alive after being missing for 8 days, his body dumped in Boryspil to freeze; journalists who did communicate with him showed pictures showing his face scarred and badly beaten, and clothed in blood-soiled attire. His ear was cut off and he had piercings in his hands by nails; which showed signs that he was crucified while being tortured. According to Bulatov, the men who abducted him spoke with Russian accents. Opposition leader Petro Poroshenko suggested that the abductors of Bulatov could be the same that abducted Ihor Lutsenko and killed Yuriy Verbytsky, as Bulatov was found in the same woods as the other two, and asked the same line of questions. Opposition leader Arseniy Yatsenyuk stated "Recent events with Dmytro Bulatov are evidence of the facts there are now death squads in Ukraine, like in Latin America". Police suggested that his injuries and story could be staged by himself "to cause a negative public response." Police placed him and other AutoMaidan activists on the country's wanted list the next day for causing a "mass disturbance." On 31 January, police attempted to arrest Bulatov from a Kyiv hospital but were stopped by protesters who protected him. "We will insist in Munich on starting an international investigation into all the facts of murders, abuse, torture, kidnapping of people and those incidents where journalists were targeted and shot at. Recent events with Dmytro Bulatov are evidence of the facts there are now death squads in Ukraine, like in Latin America," said Arsenyi Yatsenyuk, leader of the Fatherland Party. EU politician Carl Bidt blamed Ukrainian authorities for committing the crimes against Bulatov, and said act must not go unpunished. The spokesman for the United Nations High Commissioner for Human Rights, Rupert Colville, called for an investigation. Leonid Kozhara, the Ukrainian foreign minister stated "physically, this man is in good condition, and the only thing he has is a scratch on one of his cheeks."

The BBC reported that a bus load of pro-government supporters were stopped outside of Kyiv by police who mistook them for Euromaidan activists, and assaulted them. Despite the passengers shouting "we're on the same side as you", police proceeded to beat the passengers. The coach was attacked because its number plates were from western Ukraine; the group was in fact from the Crimean city of Sevastopol in the south.

On 31 January 2014 the minister of MVS Vitaliy Zakharchenko officially requested the use of RPO-A Shmel (90mm rocket launchers) to use against protesters to restore order. On 1 February 2014, the MVS commented that the use of flamethrowers by its forces was inaccurate. Shmel and Shmel-M are rounds with gas grenades of tear-inducing action.

On 31 January 2014 the SBU accused the opposition party Batkivshchyna of preparing a coup-d'etat.

On Sunday 2 February 2014 the protests held on Maidan Nezalezhnosti numbered about 50,000 people.

On 3 February 2014 President Yanukovych resumed his duties after four days of illness. According to Party of Regions politician Yuriy Miroshnichenko he stated the same day that he would never declare a state of emergency or use troops or other force to clear Kyiv's main protest zone Maidan Nezalezhnosti "because these are also our citizens". Allegedly meanwhile (Note: American and European officials believed that while the Russian leadership would be to busy with its 2014 Winter Olympics the EU and USA could play a defining role in Ukraine.) (according to American and European officials (Note: Who stated this on the sidelines of the Munich Security Conference 2014.), the U.S. State Department and EU High Representative for Foreign Affairs Catherine Ashton in an interview with The Wall Street Journal) a joint EU-US financial aid package was in the works to end the crises in Ukraine. (Note: This financial package would allow Ukraine to reform its economy sufficiently to qualify for a long-delayed loan from the International Monetary Fund in exchange of a government of experts (possibly led by a leadership that would be acceptable to Euromaidan protesters) and President Yanukovych would be able to serve out his presidency till the 2015 Ukrainian presidential election, albeit with reduced constitutional powers.) On 3 February 2014 European Commission President José Manuel Barroso (told reporters) "We are not going to a bidding competition to say who pays more for a signature of Ukraine".

UNIAN described the situation at Maidan Nezalezhnosti and Hrushevskoho Street on midday 3 February 2014 as "calm". And it reported 1,000 protestors on Maidan Nezalezhnosti and 50 on Hrushevskoho Street.

On 4 February 2014 the opposition unsuccessfully tried to push through an unconditional amnesty for all detained protesters, and the returning to the constitution as it was between 2004 and 2010, in the Verkhovna Rada (Ukraine's parliament). According to the President's Representative to Verkhovna Rada Yuriy Miroshnychenko "the negotiating process is still ongoing, but we are seeing signs of a path that would enable us to exit this situation ... we have started moving forward". The same day U.S. Vice President Joe Biden in a telephone call urged President Yanukovych to accept international support to resolve the political crisis and to remove riot police, release detainees, and prosecute those responsible for attacking journalists and protesters.

Catherine Ashton visited Ukraine on 4 and 5 February 2014 and met with the Ukrainian opposition and President Yanukovych. On 5 February 2014 the Verkhovna Rada did not pass any laws, but according to Speaker of the Verkhovna Rada Volodymyr Rybak the following day work would involve "leaders of the factions and a working commission to prepare a law on constitutional reform". And opposition leader Yatsenyuk said in an interview with Deutsche Welle: "Our long-term plan foresees the preparation of a new Constitution draft and its adoption by September. Our short-term prospective is to achieve the return to the Constitution of 2004 as a temporary decision until we adopt a new Constitution". He added that he was ready to become Prime Minister, but only in a government with opposition representatives and with the Constitution of 2004 back in force. On 6 February 2014 Party of Regions faction leader Oleksandr Yefremov stated that his faction would participate in the drafting of amendments to the Constitution of Ukraine and added: "We see it this way: in September we should bring the country's main law into line with the provision that currently corresponds to our society".

== 6–17 February 2014 ==
On 6 February 2014 an explosive device in a package labeled "Medicine" exploded in the Trade Unions Building near Maidan Nezalezhnosti injuring two activists from Lviv Oblast: 20-year-old Roman Dzvinivskiy with a severed hand, and 16-year-old Nazar Derzhilo, who lost an eye. The explosion took place on the fifth floor where the revolutionary headquarters of the Right Sector is located. Dzvinivskiy was wearing a jacket with a Right Sector badge. The victim described the man who gave him the explosives as speaking Ukrainian with a Russian accent and commended the victim for heroism before giving him the box containing explosives. In the Ukrainian House other more powerful explosives were found; an Automaidan driver removed it. Batkivshchyna MP Olesya Orobets, citing 3 inside sources, said she believed that the whole operation was an attempt to set up the Right Sector as an extremist organization that was preparing explosive materials against the government in its headquarters. The next day interior minister Vitaliy Zakharchenko suggested that the explosion had occurred "...while a bomb was being made" because "...right-wing radicalized groups are preparing to disturb the peace and they will stop at nothing, even a terror attack. This is proven by the operative information that we have and the latest events at the House of Unions, where an explosion has been staged". Orobets argued that these were improvised explosives not made on site: "Judging from the injuries, it is not a homemade explosive. The force of the explosion shows that it was from a military arsenal."

A diplomatic scandal appeared when a conversation between the Assistant Secretary of State for European and Eurasian Affairs at the United States Department of State, Victoria Nuland and United States Ambassador to Ukraine Geoffrey R. Pyatt that was apparently intercepted and uploaded to YouTube two days earlier became widely known.

On 6 February 2014, Ukrainian Prosecutor General Viktor Pshonka stated that the new amnesty law applied to 259 people and some 70 people remained in custody. He stated that the amnesty law would apply only if protesters freed all the administrative buildings without exception, pulled apart the barricades and unblocked transport routes in all the regions of Ukraine before 17 February 2014.

On 6 February 2014, a senior adviser to Russian President Vladimir Putin, Sergey Glazyev, stated in an interview with (the Ukrainian edition of) Kommersant that the US was ignoring the 1994 Budapest Memorandum on Security Assurances because it was (according to him) spending $20 million a week on Ukrainian opposition groups including supplying "rebels" with arms. Among other things, "There is information that within the grounds of the American embassy, there is training for fighters, that they're arming them". Glazyev also suggested "In a situation when the authorities encounter a coup attempt, they simply have no choice [but to use force]. Otherwise the country will be plunged into chaos". According to Glazyev "According to this document (the memorandum), Russia and the US are guarantors of the sovereignty and territorial integrity of Ukraine and, frankly speaking, [Russia is] obliged to intervene when conflict situations of this kind arise". (Note: Sergey Glazyev also stated in the interview "The [Ukrainian] authorities are not fulfilling their duty to defend the state, negotiating with putschists as if they are law-abiding citizens" and also accused the Western world of "blackmailing" President Yanukovich and Ukrainian oligarchs by threatening to seize their extensive foreign assets and blacklist them from travelling. Furthermore he suggested (in a compare with the status between Greenland and Denmark) that Western and Eastern Ukraine could have different economic relations with the EU and Russia "Today, economic, cultural and human ties between the regions of eastern and western Ukraine are less than the links between southeastern Ukraine and Russia and between the western regions and the EU"; suggesting Eastern Ukraine could then join the Customs Union of Belarus, Kazakhstan, and Russia.)

On 7 February 2014 Victoria Nuland told a press conference in Kyiv that the U.S. was ready to provide support to Ukraine "if it moves quickly in the direction of the protection of human rights, dignity, conflict de-escalation, and political reform. Otherwise the EU, the International Monetary Fund, and the U.S. will not provide financial assistance to Ukraine".

On 9 February, opposition leaders announced the formation of self-defense units across the country. Vitali Klitschko said people can sign up for the self-defense teams through his UDAR party, while opposition leader Yuriy Lutsenko called on people to grab baseball bats and helmets to protect the protests. Lutsenko then spoke in Russian during an appeal to eastern Ukrainians to join in the protests. Political scientist Oleksiy Haran speculated on Yanukovych's meeting with Putin in Sochi was done to receive permission to forcefully disperse the protests. Later, Euromaidan self-defense units found a room containing computer servers and recordings of activists, which they also believed to be where explosives were made in the bombing of the Trade Union building. The building is owned by education minister Dmytro Tabachnyk.

On 15 February it was reported that the leader of the Social Nationalist Assembly, which was part of the Right Sector coalition, had gone missing; the SNA gave a warning that if he did not turn up, they would take action.

On 15 February Podrobnosti reported that members of anti-maidan group "Kyivans for a Clean City" attempted to dismantle barricades and fought with Svoboda organized self-defense units. Police reported that the "Clean City" activists were beaten by 10 self-defense guards, whose members were armed with batons, threw firecrackers and applied tear gas; According to activists on the scene, the Clean City activists who attacked the barricades were accused of being titushky and paid provocateurs, and were seen in photos wearing Russian St. George Ribbons.

On 17 February the "Law on amnesty of Ukrainian protesters" (the exempt from criminal liabilities and punishment for Euromaidan protesters who committed crimes in the period 27 December 2013 through 2 February 2014) after the conditions (vacation of the seized administrative buildings, among them the regional state administrations, self-government bodies and the Kyiv City State Administration, and the unblocking of Kyiv's Hrushevskoho Street) were met by evening 16 February. According to an UNIAN correspondent a few streets in Kyiv remained blocked. Also on 17 February Russian Finance Minister Anton Siluanov stated that Russia would release the next US$2 billion tranche of the 17 December 2013 $15 billion loan to Ukraine the same week.

== 18–23 February 2014 ==
On 18 February 2014, 20,000 Euromaidan protesters in Kyiv advanced on Ukraine's parliament in support of rolling back the Constitution of Ukraine to its pre-2004 form. Police and protesters fired guns, with both live and rubber ammunition, and police used tear gas and flash grenades in an attempt to repel thousands of demonstrators, who fought back with crude weapons and explosives. The most serious clashes took place at Mariinskyi Park, on Hrushevskoho Street and on Institutska Street near Shovkovychna Street. At least 26 people were killed, including 10 policemen; at least 1,100 injured after police clashed with protesters during the day. Police later stormed the main protest camp on Maidan Nezalezhnosti. After President Yanukovych refused to accept a ceasefire and a return to peaceful demonstrations, opposition leader Arseniy Yatsenyuk said "we really are on the threshold of the most dramatic page in the history of our country."

On 19 February 2014, police checkpoints, restrictions on public transportation and schools closure were ordered by the authorities in Kyiv, which according to Ukrayinska Pravda amounts to a de facto state of emergency. One member of parliament in interview acknowledged that state of emergency is de facto implemented nationwide as transportation to the capital is paralyzed. Russia has been officially warned about its intervention in the Ukrainian internal affairs. On 20 February Minister of Internal Affairs Vitaliy Zakharchenko announced he had signed a decree to authorize the usage of live ammunition against protesters. Same day to Boryspil unofficially arrived a Russian delegation of seven people including Vladislav Surkov, a curator of the "Ukrainian scenario" in Kremlin. The delegation was greeted by the head of SBU department of counterintelligence Volodymyr Bik. According to the Russian foreign minister Sergei Lavrov, one of the members FSB Colonel General Sergei Beseda arrived to Kyiv to make sure appropriate level of security of the Russian embassies which was considered unlikely as nobody from the Russian embassy arrived to meet their compatriots. According to Andrei Soldatov, the delegation visited Kyiv to ensure loyalty of Yanukovych.

On 21 February an agreement was signed between Yanukovych and leaders of the parliamentary opposition, witnessed by representatives from European Union and Russia. which promised return to the 2004 constitution, early elections and withdrawal of security forces from the center of the capital.

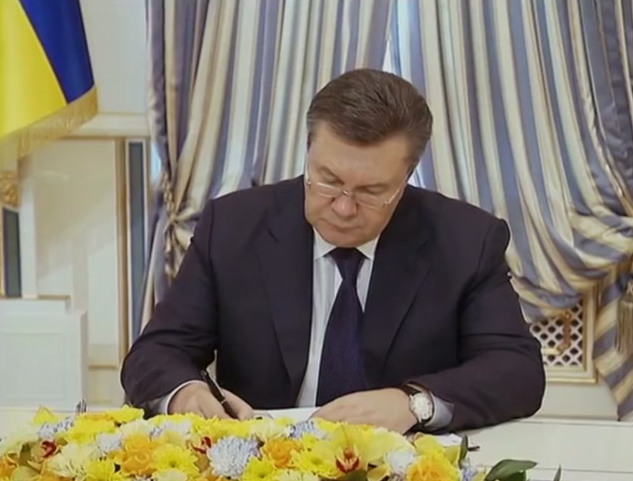
Yanukovych signs the peace deal.

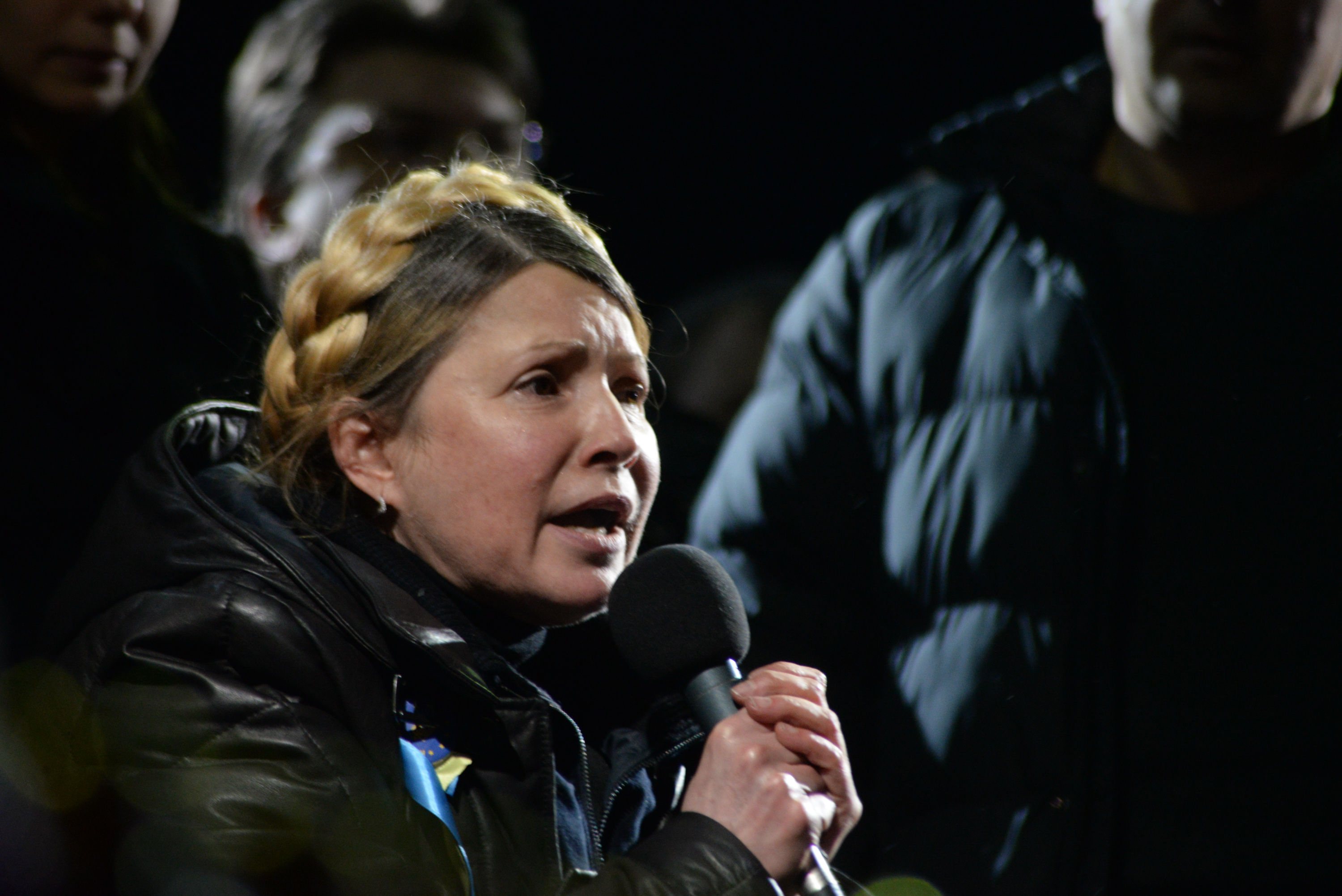
Tymoshenko addresses the Euromaidan.

Also on that day, Yanukovych and Parliament declared 22 and 23 February to be new days of mourning "due to the loss of human life as a result of mass disturbances". On the evening of 21 February Yanukovych left Kyiv for Kharkiv, then for Donetsk. On 22 February Yanukovych, prosecutor general Victor Pshonka and minister of revenues and duties Aleksandr Klimenko attempted to fly to Moscow from Donetsk Airport on a private jet, but were stopped by Ukrainian border force. Yanukovych was ultimately extracted by Russian special forces at night of 24 February.

On Maidan Nezalezhnosti, Klitschko announced that he and the opposition would be soon voting on the impeachment of Viktor Yanukovych in parliament; the bill of which was registered in the previous session. In Parliament, Speaker Volodymyr Rybak submitted his resignation, citing alleged illness. Yanukovych's whereabouts were unknown despite media reports he had flown to Kharkiv. Oleksandr Turchynov stated that in fact most of the ministers had disappeared as well as Interior Minister Vitaly Zakharchenko (who is reported to have fled to Belarus) and President Viktor Yanukovych, "The only one legitimate body left is the Verkhovna Rada – so we are here to vote today. The major tasks for today are: to vote for the new speaker, prime minister and interior minister." Parliament voted Turchynov as new speaker and Yulia Tymoshenko was released from captivity, after which she traveled to Kyiv and addressed the thousands of protesters on the Euromaidan. On 23 February, Turchynov was also chosen as temporary president.

At the Congress of the Southern and Eastern regions the deputies passed a resolution, declaring that they are ready to take responsibility for protecting constitutional order in their territory. They stated that the recent events in Kyiv led to paralysis of the central power and a destabilization in the country.

== Aftermath ==
After the success of Euromaidan and the Revolution of Dignity, Yanukovych fled the country as a fugitive for Russia. Immediately, pro-Russian unrest erupted across Ukraine and the Russian military annexed Crimea, resulting in the outbreak of the Russo-Ukrainian War.

In Kyiv, pro-Maidan protestors stated that the barricades at Maidan Nezalezhnosti would stand till at least 25 May 2014, the day of the 2014 Ukrainian presidential election. After Vitali Klitschko was elected Mayor of Kyiv on 25 May 2014, authorities negotiated with protesters to clear Maidan Nezalezhnosti.

On 7 August 2014, a part of the barricades and tents were removed after clashes between activists and the Kyiv-1 and Kyiv-2 National Guard battalions. On the morning of 8 August 2014, an agreement was made between part of the Maidan Self-Defense and the Mayor's office for the release of Khreshchatyk Street in exchange for the release of prisoners captured by the National Guard in preceding days. Mayor Vitali Klitschko called on Kyiv residents to come help to clean up Maidan on the morning of 9 August. That day, instead of clearing Khreshchatyk as promised, almost the entire Maidan was cleared by citizens of Kyiv and hired plainclothes men. The dismantling continued until 10 August, when not a single residential tent remained.

Despite Vitali Klitschko promising to allow the stage to remain, the Kyiv-1 Battalion came to dismantle the stage. It was partially re-assembled into working order by activists and Kyivans at noon on 10 August, though in the aftermath of the deaths that took place at Maidan during the Revolution of Dignity, the square is no longer used for many non-political events, such as Christmas fairs or New Year events.

== See also ==
- Timeline of the Orange Revolution
