= National Bank of Ukraine Building =

National Bank Building
- Будівля Національного банку
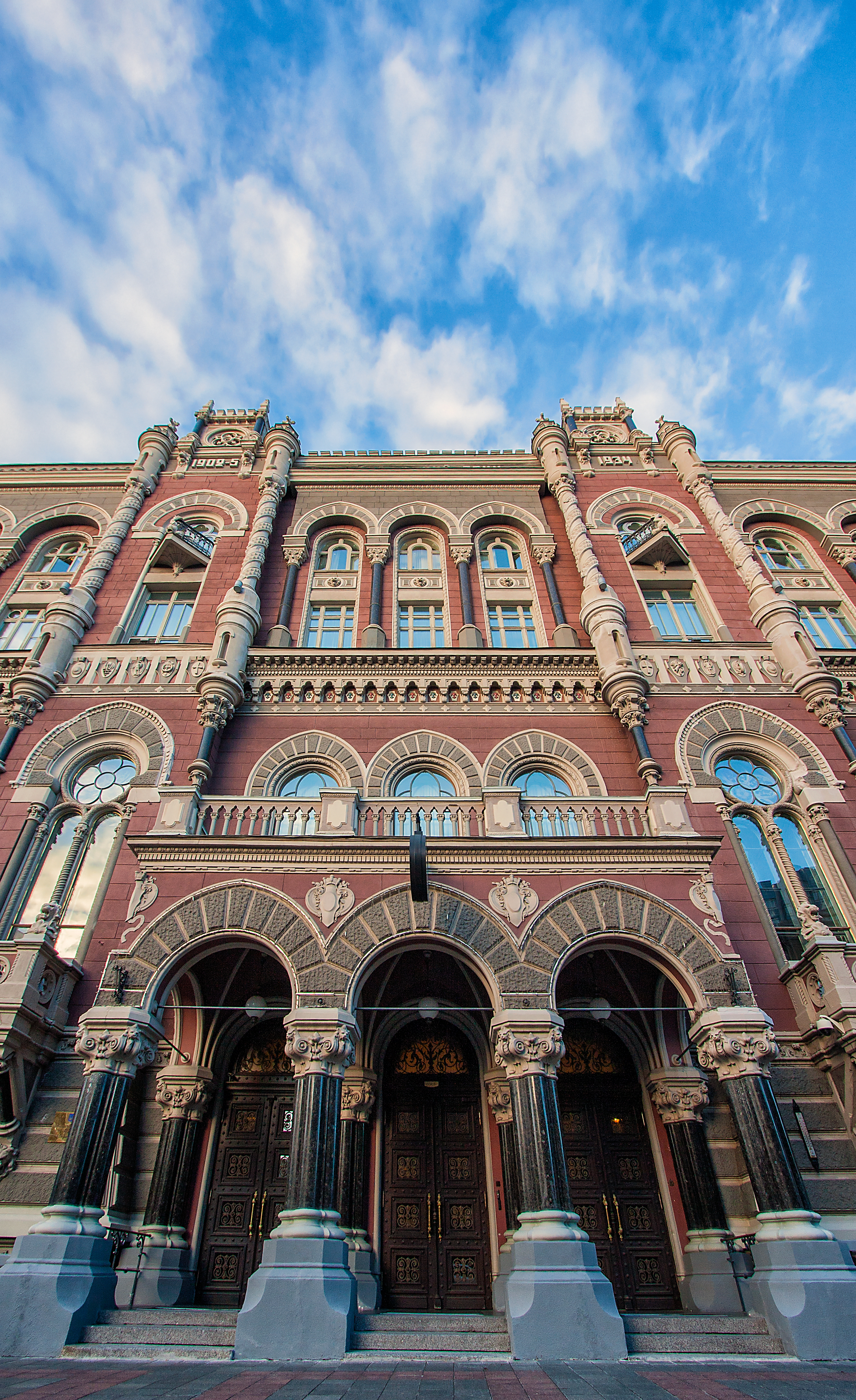
- The front façade of the National Bank of Ukraine building, designed by architect Oleksandr Verbytskyi.
- Interactive map of the National Bank Building area

General information
- Architectural style: Venetian Gothic revival, Art Nouveau
- Location: Lypky, Kyiv, Ukraine, Instytutska Street, 9
- Coordinates: 50°26′49″N 30°31′55″E
- Construction started: 1902
- Completed: 1905
- Renovated: 1934

Technical details
- Floor count: 4

Design and construction
- Architects: Oleksandr Kobeliev, Oleksandr Verbytskyi, and Emilio Sala

The National Bank of Ukraine building (Ukrainian: Будівля Національного банку, romanized: Budivlia Natsionalnoho banku) serves as the headquarters for the National Bank of Ukraine, located in the country's capital Kyiv. The building is located in the city's Pecherskyi District, which houses several other prominent Ukrainian government offices.

It was originally built in 1905 for the Kiev (today Kyiv) branch of the State Bank of the Russian Empire on a draft of Imperial Russian architects Alexandr Kobelev.

In the design of the building, Russian architect Kobeliev expressed Russian Revival style Building itself resembles Basin house in St. Petersburg or Ingumov's House in Moscow. The new building was built right next to older which is kept as an auxiliary structure of the bank. The building is located in Lypky neighborhood at Instytutska street, 9.

== Description ==
The structure has a pink-grey color with marble columns and exquisite ornament. To decorate the house with artificial stones and perform interior artwork was handed to the Italian sculptor Emilio Sala who previously worked with Władysław Horodecki. The structure's portico in front of the entrance includes a colonnade with a balcony. Ledges on each side (avant-corps) with balconies and paired windows, small towers on corners, underline its symmetry and harmonious outlines.

Windows of the first floor are separated by thin Corinthian columns. At the second floor to the top in the shape of a semicircle are paired gothic windows with elements of rose window. Windowsills of the second and fourth floors faced with stones of roughly polished surfaces and sculptural decorations in the forms of lion's heads. Special attention draw details of exterior design e.g., wide cornice with fragment made of majolica, solomonic columns with decorative towers, sculpture of griffins (guardians of gold mines in antique mythology).

== History ==
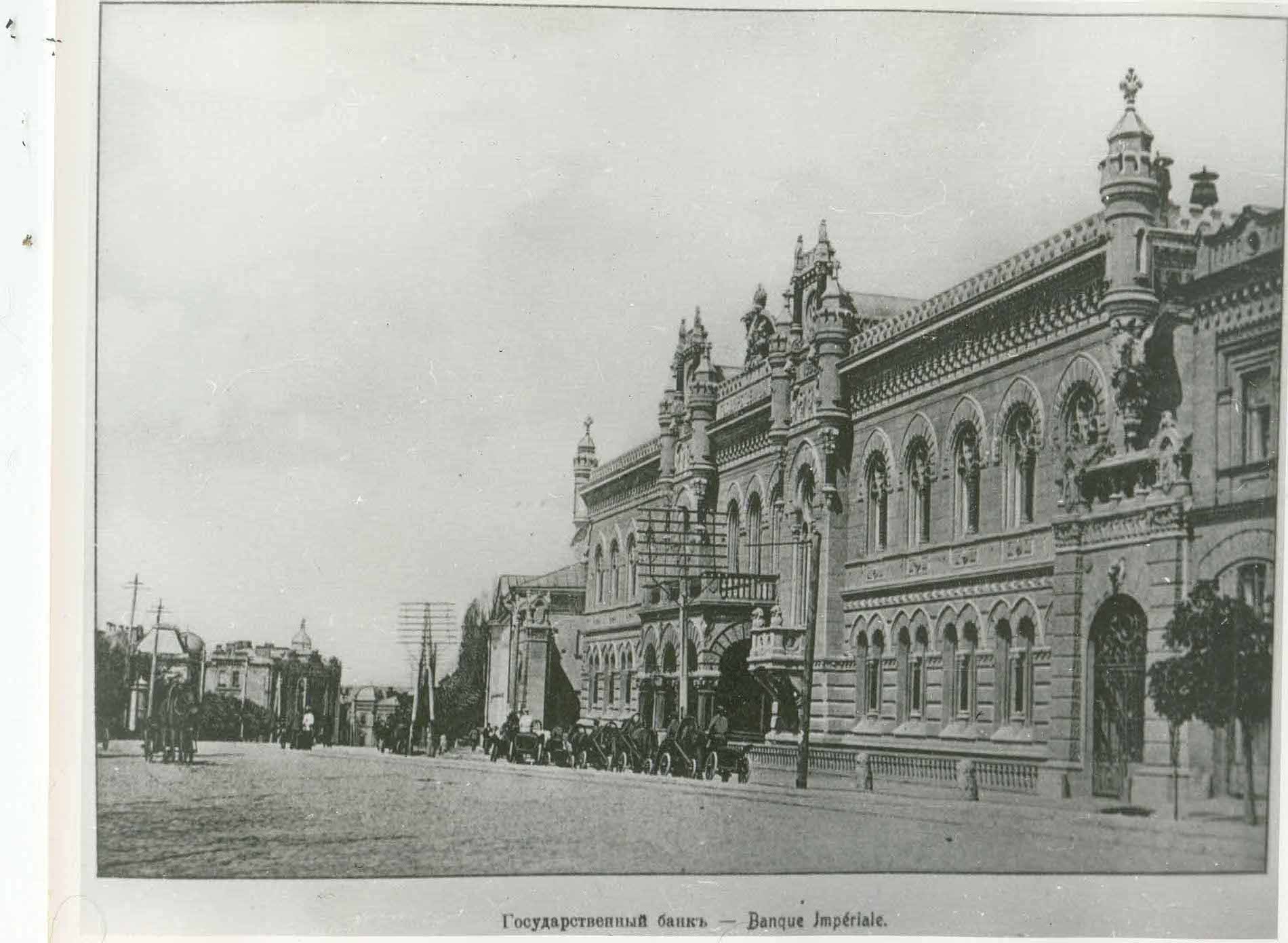
Original two-story view of the building, prior to World War I.

The history of the bank is traced to 1839 when in Kyiv was established a branch of the State Commercial Bank of the Russian Empire with the ongoing reform in the Russian Empire when assignation ruble was being replaced for state credit notes. In 1841 for the bank was built an Empire style (or broader neoclassical style) building (today is the older building). In 1860 in Russian Empire took place another reform when the State Commercial Bank was liquidated along with the State Loan Bank and in their place was formed the State Bank of the Russian Empire. At the same time the Kyiv branch was grandfathered into the new entity. The original building that once belonged to the local Noble Assembly by the end of the nineteenth century required major expansion. There were some propositions to preserve the original building, yet at the end it was decided to build a new building.

In 1900, the Saint-Petersburg-based State Bank initiated a competition for construction of a new building. The competition was won by architect Oleksandr Kobeliev, and groundbreaking took place in 1902. Shortly after construction had started, architect Oleksandr Verbytskyi joined the project, responsible for the design of the front façade. The Italian sculptor Emilio Sala (who also worked on the nearby House with Chimaeras) was invited to create the interior decorations. The style is inspired by the palazzos of the Italian Renaissance.

On August 1, 1905, the building was completed and the bank had moved in. The new building featured modern lighting, ventilation, and a centralized heating system. In 1934, when the capital of the Ukrainian Soviet Socialist Republic was transferred from Kharkiv to Kyiv, two more floors were added to the building, in order to accommodate the larger footprint of the State Bank of the USSR. The building's original architect, Oleksandr Kobeliev, was responsible for the subsequent expansion, which was completed without disrupting the bank's operation.

During the 2022 Russian invasion of Ukraine, the building was damaged on 1 January 2025 due to a Russian attack.

== Gallery ==
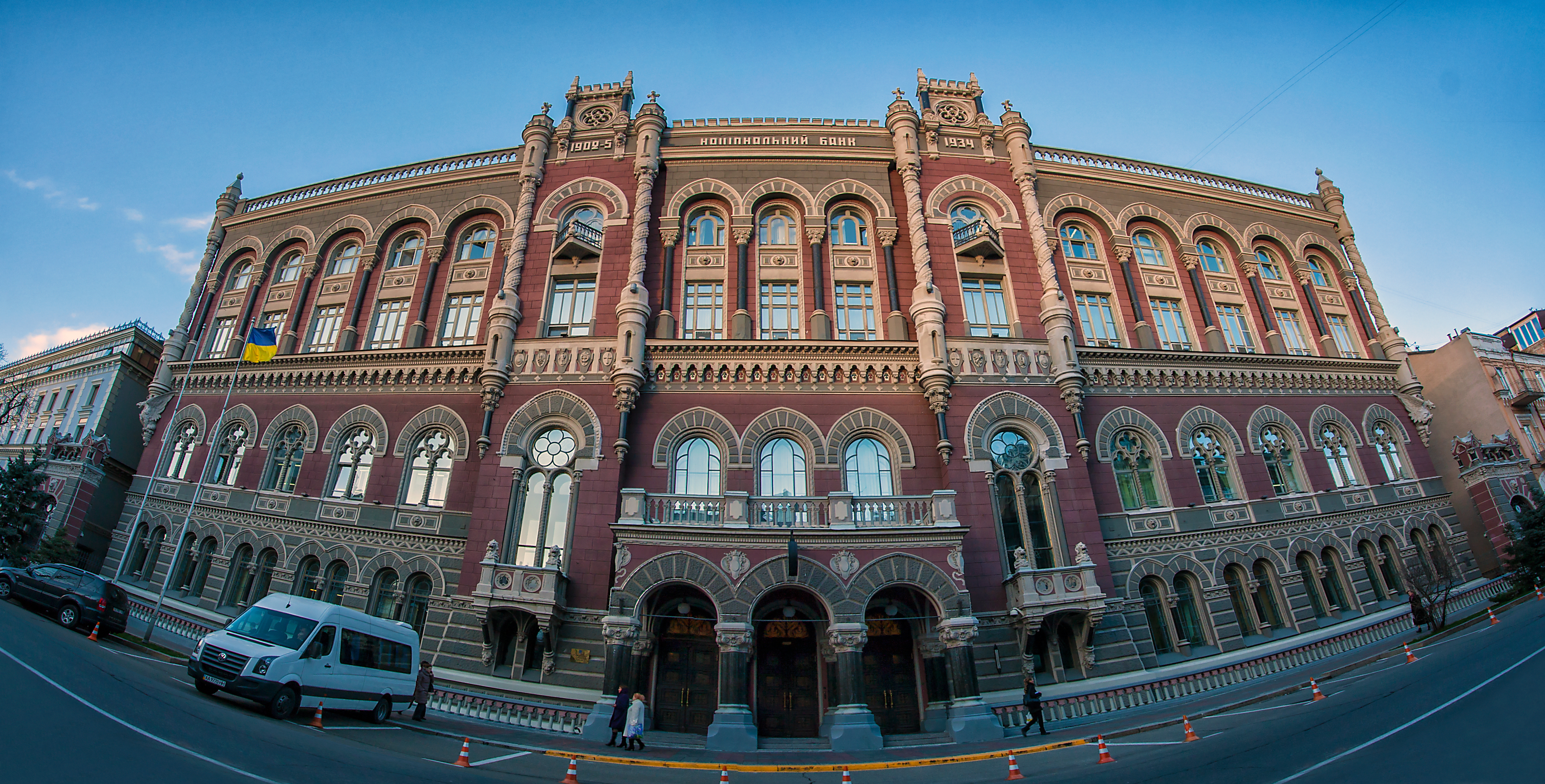
Panorama of the building's façade, designed by Verbytskyi.

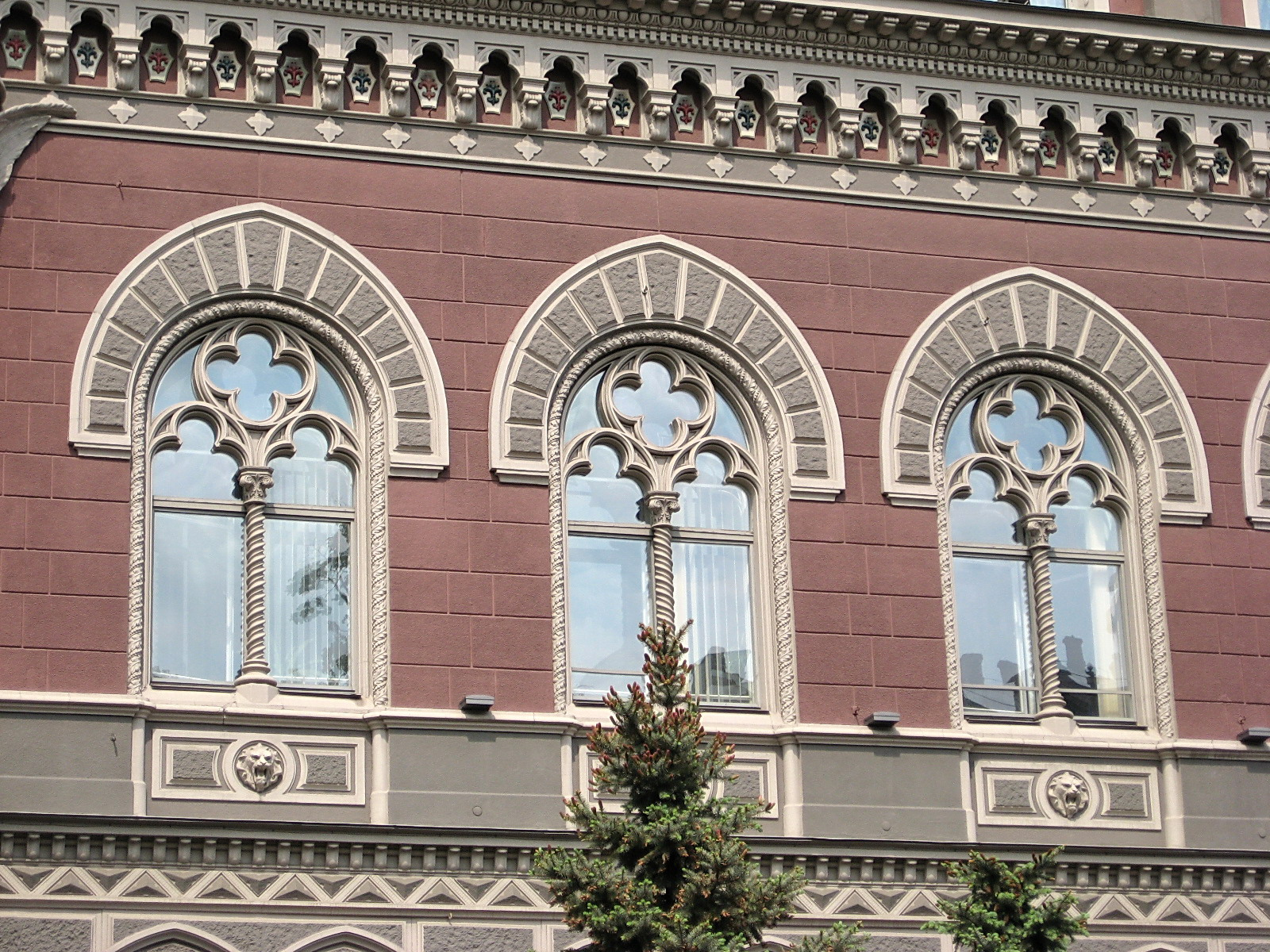
Second floor Gothic windows with elements of rose windows.

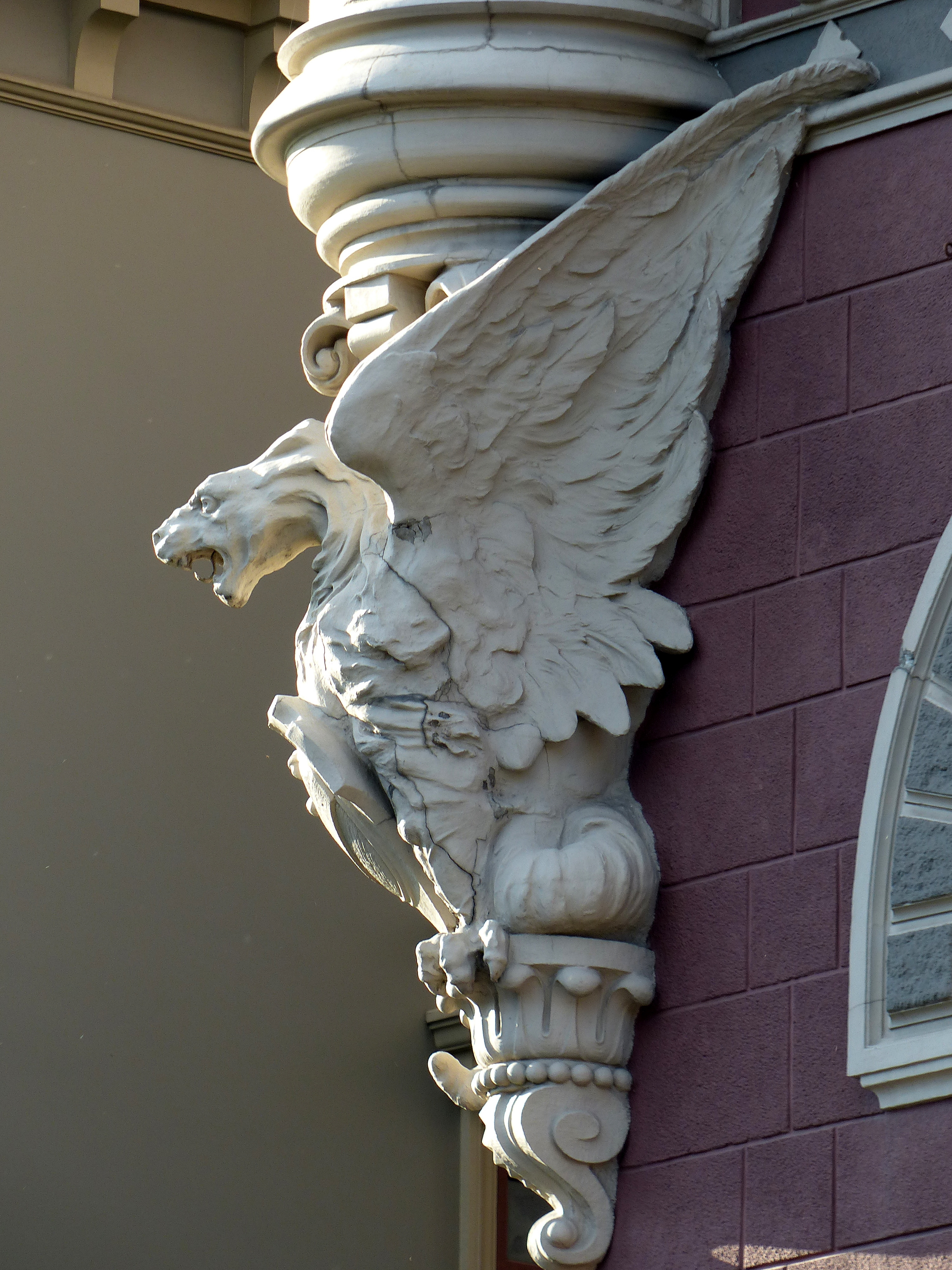
Close-up of the building's decorative gargoyles.

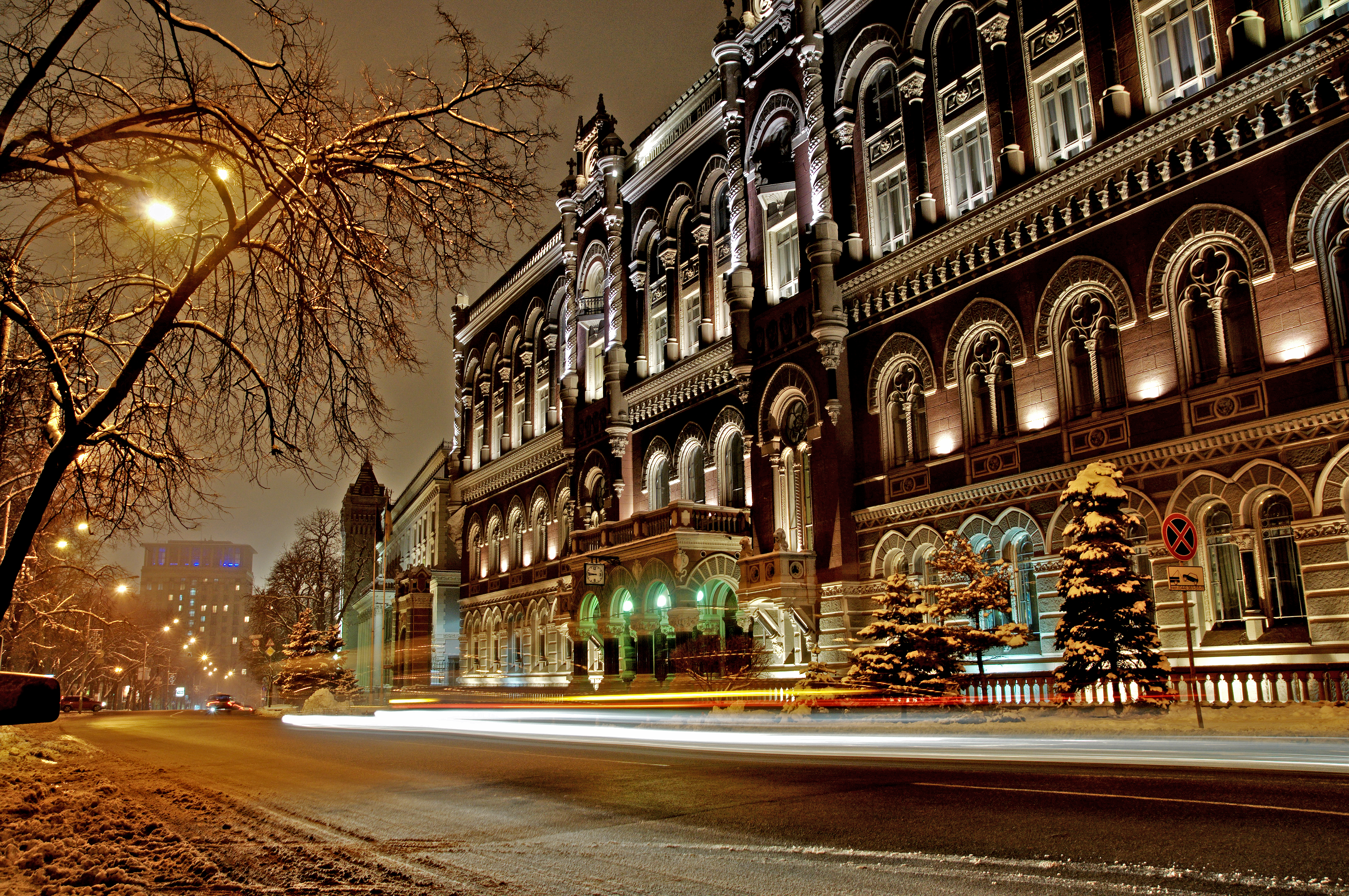
View on a winter night, 2009,

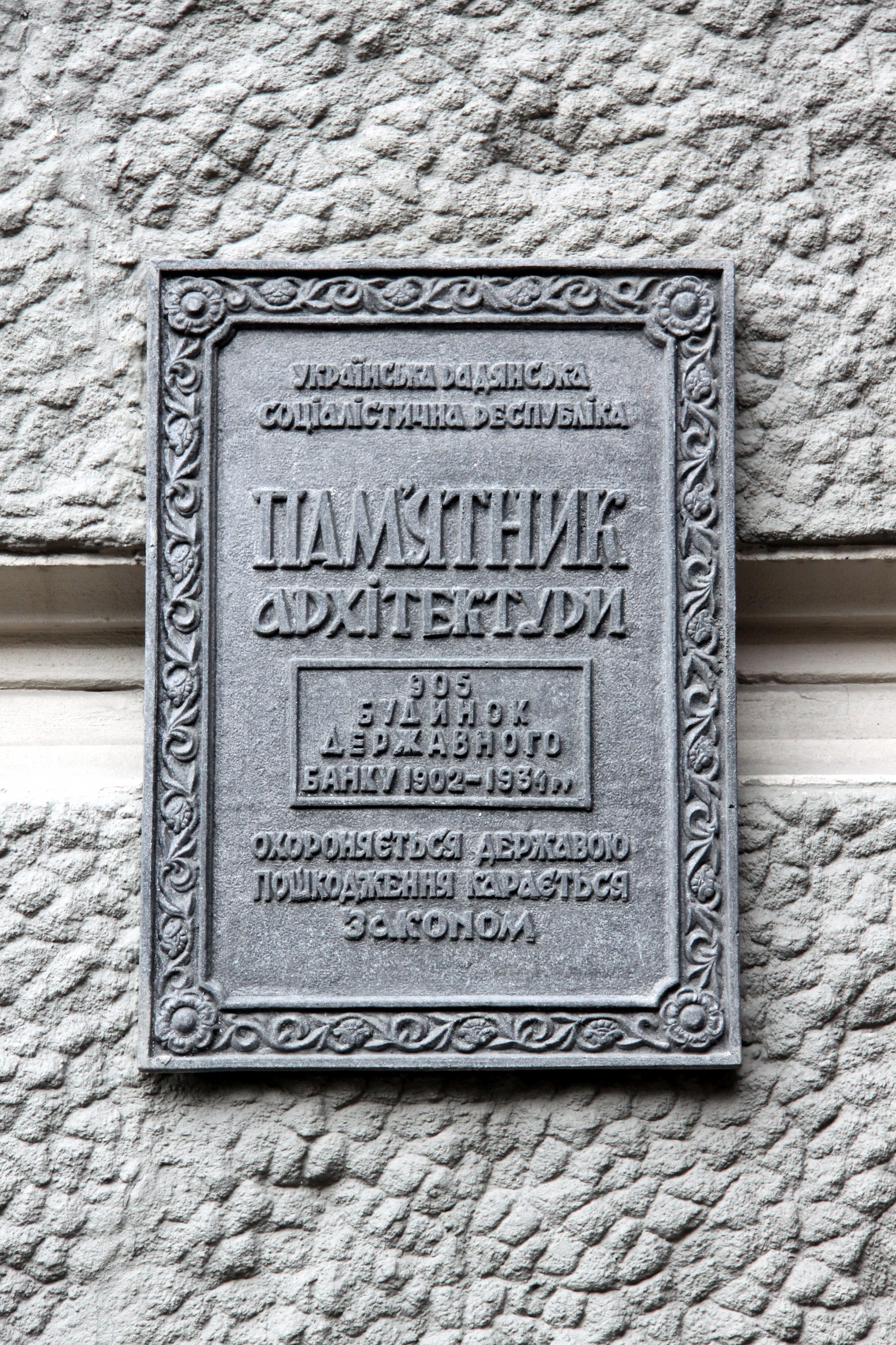
Plaque indicating the building is a landmark of architecture.
