= Sholudki =

Village in Vinnytsia Oblast, Ukraine

- Village
- Location within Ukraine
- Coordinates: 48°54′38″N 28°47′30″E
- Country: Ukraine
- Oblast: Vinnytsia
- Raion: Nemyriv
- Time zone: UTC+2 (EET)
  - Summer (DST): UTC+3 (EEST)

Sholudki (Ukrainian: Шолудьки, Polish: Szołudki) is a village in Nemyriv Raion, Vinnytsia Oblast, Ukraine. It is situated on the Southern Bug River, in the historic region of Podolia.

== History ==
Szołudki was a private village of the Gluziński and Czetwertyński noble families, administratively located in the Bracław County in the Bracław Voivodeship in the Lesser Poland Province of the Kingdom of Poland. In Polish it was primarily known as Szołudki; other names were Szełudki, Szałuńki and Szułuńki. After the Partitions of Poland, it was located in the Bratslav uezd in the Podolia Governorate. In terms of religious affiliation, Roman Catholics belonged to the parish in Nemyriv, whilst Orthodox Christians belonged to the parish in Ostapkivtsi.

== Notable people ==
- Władysław Horodecki (1863–1930), Polish architect
