= Karaite Kenesa (Kyiv) =

Former kenesa in Kyiv, Ukraine

Karaite Kenesa of Kyiv
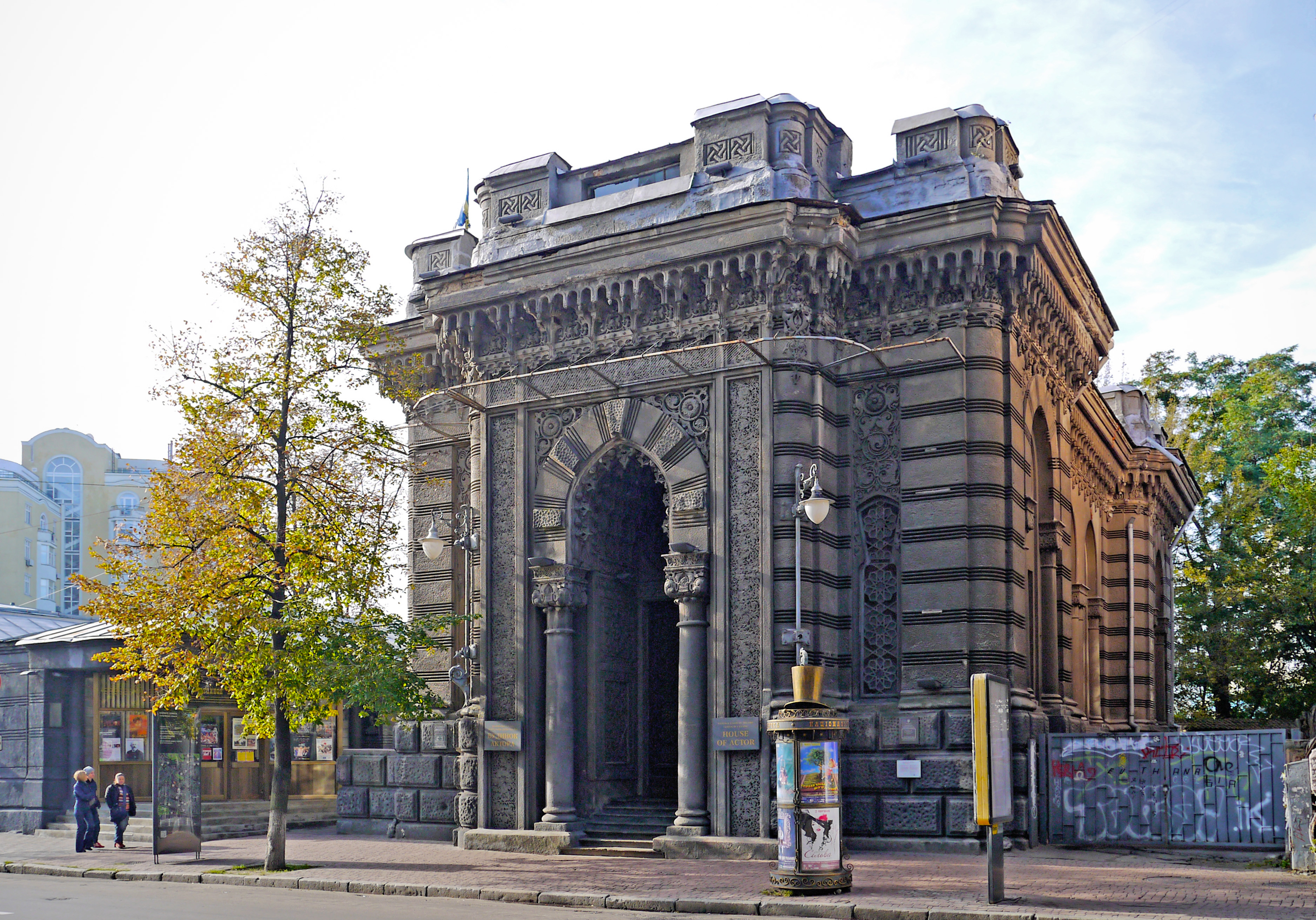
- The former synagogue, now Actor's House, in 2017

- Location of the former synagogue, now Actor's House, in Ukraine

Religion
- Affiliation: Karaite Judaism (former)
- Ecclesiastical or organisational status: Synagogue (1902–1929); Drama center (since 1981)

Location
- Location: Yaroslaviv Val Street 7, Shevchenkivskyi District, Kyiv
- Country: Ukraine
- Coordinates: 50°27′00″N 30°30′40″E

Architecture
- Architect: Władysław Horodecki
- Type: Synagogue architecture
- Style: Moorish Revival
- General contractor: Lev Ginsburg
- Completed: 1902
- Construction cost: ₽200,000

Immovable Monument of National Significance of Ukraine
- Official name: Кенаса караїмська (Karaite Kenesa)
- Type: Architecture
- Reference no.: 260086

Immovable Monument of Local Significance of Ukraine
- Official name: Кенаса караїмська (Karaite Kenesa)
- Type: History
- Reference no.: 67-Кв

The Karaite Kenesa of Kyiv (Ukrainian: Караїмська кенаса Києва) is a former Karaite Jewish synagogue, or kenesa, located at Yaroslaviv Val Street 7, close to the Golden Gates of Kyiv, in the Shevchenkivskyi District of Kyiv, Ukraine. The former synagogue building is listed as a monument of Architectural Heritage of National Importance of Ukraine.

Since 1981, the building has housed the Ukrainian House of Actors, also called the Actor's House.

== History ==
The Karaite synagogue was designed by Polish architect Władysław Horodecki; and was built from 1898 to 1902 in the Moorish Revival style. The building was decorated with a magnificent dome of great beauty with stucco decorations of Italian sculptor Emilio Sala using quite expensive at the time material - cement. It was funded at a cost of 200,000 Empire rubles, by Solomon and Moses Kogen, the “tobacco kings” of the South-Western land, as that part of Ukraine was known during the Russian Empire tsarist times.

Karaites first appeared on the territory of modern Ukraine in the 1230s - almost immediately after the Mongol invasion of Kyivan Rus'. In 1795 the legislation of the Russian Empire established a distinction between the Karaites and Jews, freeing the former from the discriminatory double taxation. In 1896 the Karaite community of Kyiv consisted of 292 people. The purchase of land for the construction of Kenesa and a dwelling house (the proceeds of which would go to the benefit of Karaite community), was gifted by Solomon Kogen, at a cost of 35,000 Empire rubles. Despite the fact that in 1897 he became paralysed, Solomon Kogen continued to manage his personal affairs and died in 1900. In his will, he bequeathed the funds to complete the construction of the synagogue. The construction was continued by his brother, Moses. The consecration of Kenasa was held on January 27, 1902, by Tauride and Odesa hakham Samuel Pampulov. The ceremony was attended by the vice-governor, mayor, chancellor and other officials.

During the Soviet times, Kenesa was handed to educational institutions. Ironically this action led to preservation of the building's unique interiors. During the German occupation, it became, unexpectedly, a place for Roman Catholic services. The building was defiled during World War II by Nazis. Probably at this time it lost the dome which was part of the original structure.

=== Post World War Two ===
In a post-war period, the Puppet Theatre functioned there and afterwards, in 1952, a cinema. In the 1970s a contemporary wing was added to the building and it was converted into the Ukrainian House of Actors in 1981. Unlike most of the other synagogues in Ukraine, it was not given back to the Karaite community after independence. The building is used for concerts, dramatic performances, exhibitions and book launches.

The outward design of the building is slowly ruining because of time and exhaust gases. Under the influence of the gas-laden atmosphere and repeated painting, its color changed to dark, though in the first few decades it had a much brighter tint. One can see that on the sidewall of the building.

== Gallery ==
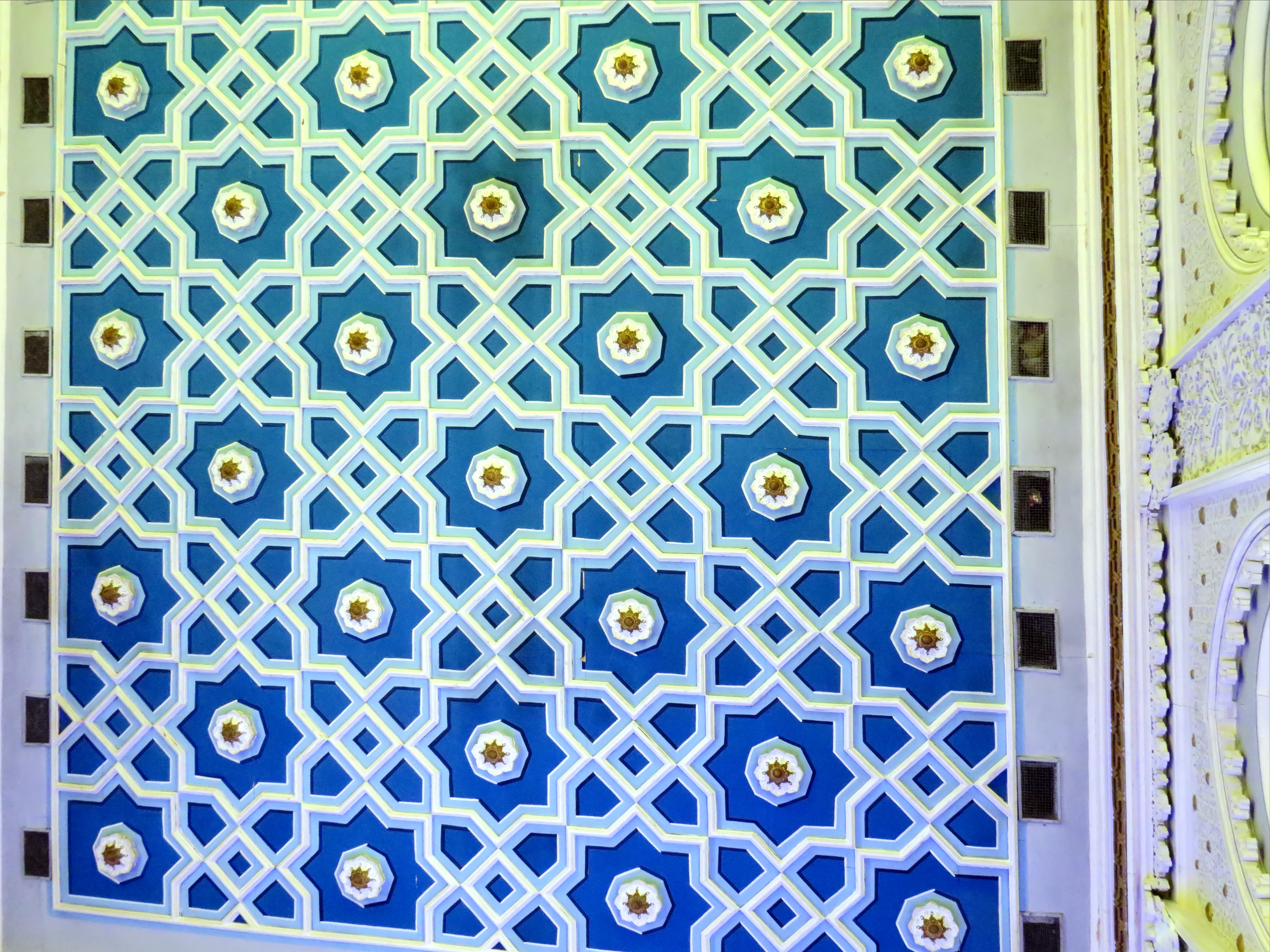
The ceiling of the synagogue, in 2018

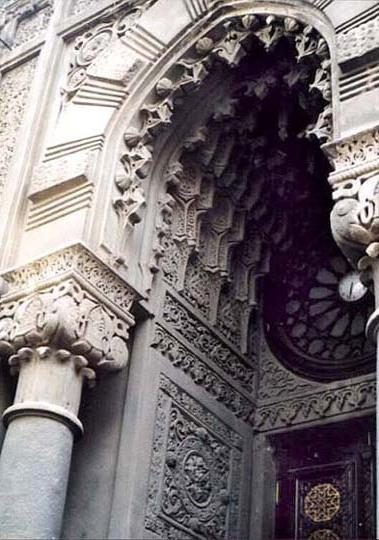
Detail of the former synagogue portico in 2008

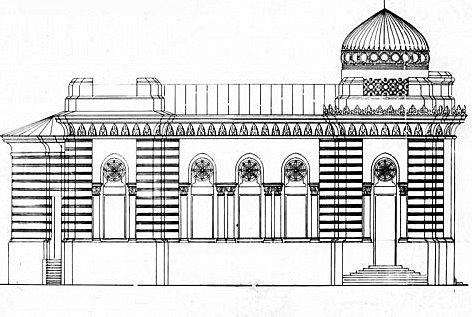
Sketch of the side view

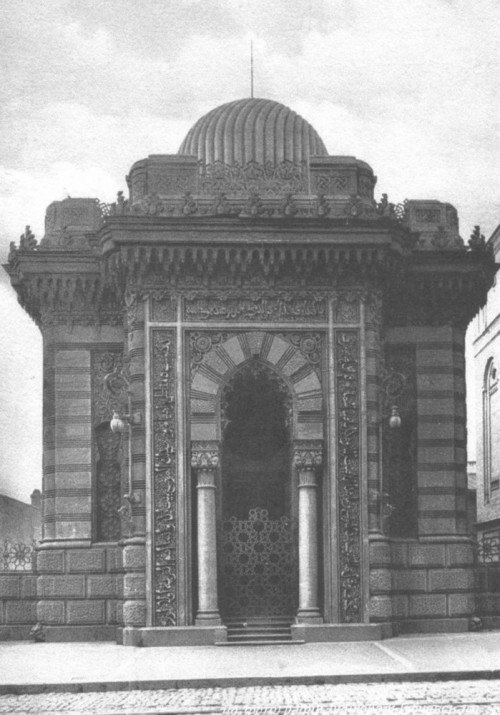
The synagogue in c. 1900

== See also ==
- History of the Jews in Ukraine
- List of synagogues in Ukraine
