= St. Nicholas Roman Catholic Church, Kyiv =

Coordinates: 50.4269°N 30.5176°E

Church of St. Nicholas
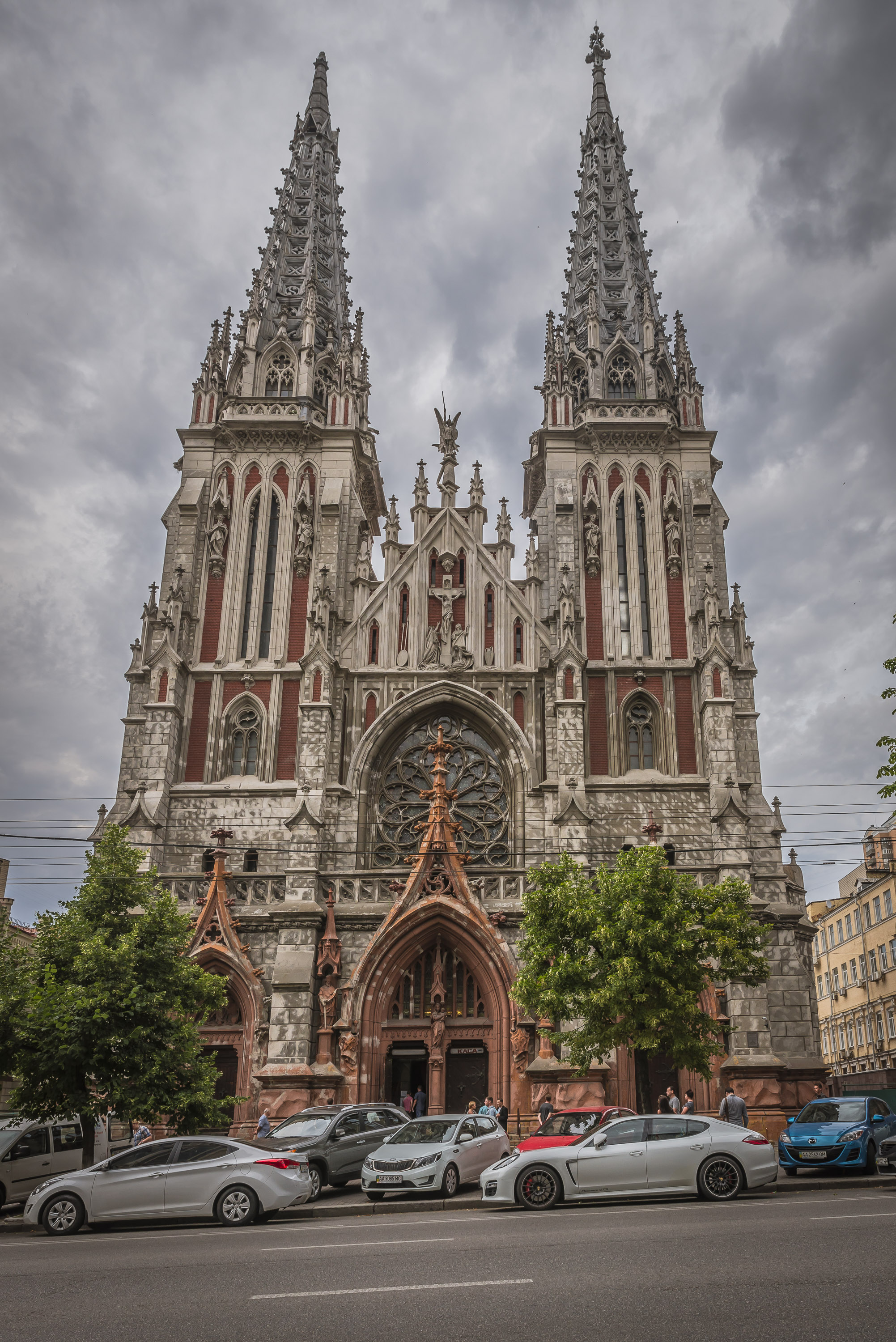
- Church façade

Religion
- Affiliation: Catholic Church
- Province: Kyiv
- Region: Eastern Europe
- Status: Active

Location
- Location: Velyka Vasylkivska Street, Pecherskyi District, Kyiv
- State: Ukraine
- Interactive map of Church of St. Nicholas

Architecture
- Architects: Stanisław Wołowski and Władysław Horodecki
- Style: Gothic Revival
- Completed: 1909

Specifications
- Direction of façade: West
- Height (max): 60 m (197 ft)
- Spire: 2

Immovable Monument of National Significance of Ukraine
- Official name: Миколаївський костьол (St. Nicholas Church)
- Type: Architecture
- Reference no.: 260108/1

The Church of St. Nicholas (Ukrainian: Костел Св. Миколая, translit.: Kostel Sviatoho Mykolaia; Polish: Kościół Świętego Mikołaja w Kijowie) is the second oldest Catholic church standing in Kyiv, the capital of Ukraine, after the St. Alexander Roman Catholic Cathedral. Today the building is shared between the Catholic Church and the National Organ and Chamber Music Hall of Ukraine.

It was constructed in 1899–1909 and was built by the Latin Catholic community in a Gothic type construction, by architects Stanisław Wołowski and Władysław Horodecki. It stands at vulytsia Velyka Vasylkivska (Greater Vasylkiv street) in Pecherskyi District next to the Kyiv National Linguistic University between the National Sports Complex Olimpiysky and the railroad station Kyiv-Tovarnyi.

== History ==
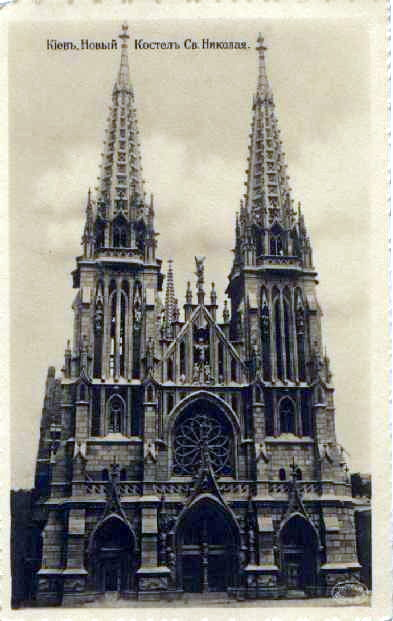
Vintage postcard depicting the church with its two 60 m (197 ft) towers

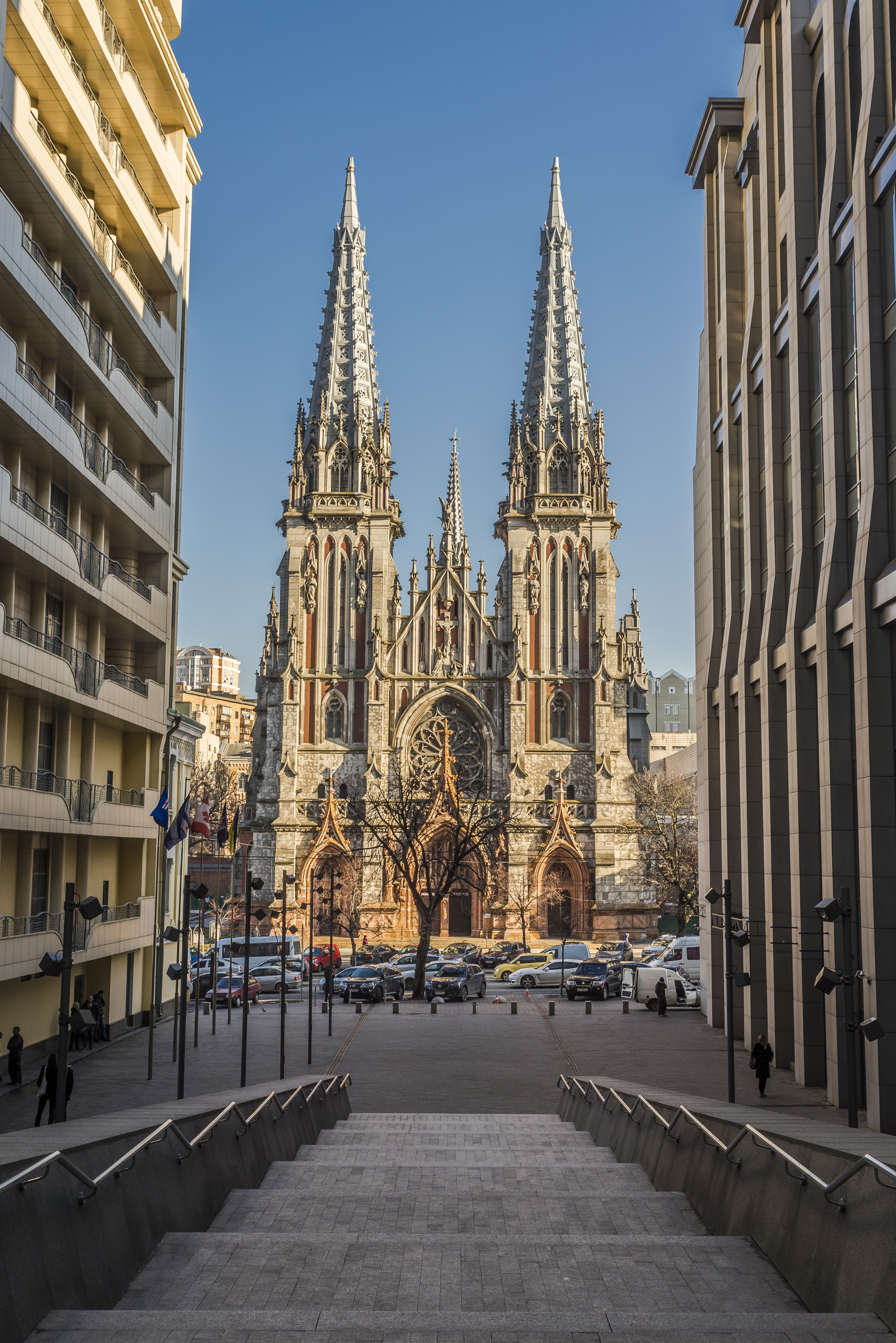
Modern view

The church was constructed to accommodate the expanding Polish community, which more than doubled in size between 1897 and 1909. The building permission was obtained thanks to the efforts of Count Władysław Branicki.

A design competition held in 1898 selected Stanisław Wołowski, whose entry was a Gothic type construction with two 60 m (197 ft) towers. The final revision and management of the project was assigned to the Polish architect Władysław Horodecki. Emilio Sala added sculptural decoration in artificial stone to the construction. To increase the stability of the construction on the uneven Kyiv ground, it was ensured by bore-and-stuffed piles, a newly introduced invention of Anton Strauss. The construction work was carried out by exclusively from voluntary donations, and lasted for ten years (1899–1909).

In 1909, the church was consecrated in the name of Saint Nicholas, however the construction was not yet completed. A Gothic style three-story house was built for the parish clergy to the left of the church. In 1938, Soviet authorities closed the church after its Roman Catholic priest was "absent" for two years due to the Soviet persecution of Christians. For some time after its closure, the building was used by the punitive organs for technical purposes, and, at some point, served as a KGB service building. After its restoration in 1979–1980, commissioned by the Rada of Ministers of the Ukrainian SSR, by the architects O. Grauzhis and I. Tukalevskiy, the church was turned into the National House of Organ and Chamber Music of Ukraine (Ukrainian: Національний будинок органної та камерної музики України; translit.: Natsional'nyi budynok orhannoyi ta kamernoi muzyky Ukrainy). For the reconstruction and restoration of the severely damaged church, the building's stained glass windows were manufactured in the Baltics, its furniture was created in Lviv, and the high-quality wood floors were produced in the Ivano-Frankivsk Oblast. The company, Rieger–Kloss then located in Czechoslovakia (Sudetenland), manufactured an organ for the church. Its manufacturer tried to architecturally tie the organ to the building itself.

Since 1992, Catholic Masses and concerts have been held here. Bishop Jan Purwinski consecrated the church and a Mass was celebrated there on 4 January 1992. Currently, it belongs to the Kyivan Municipal Department for Culture, but the [Catholic Church hopes it will be returned to the local Latin Catholic community. The Kyiv city municipality refuse to hand over the building until the issue of transferring the House of Organ Music will be solved. Since 2009 the building is in emergency conditions. As of 2020 the Ukrainian Ministry of Culture plans to construct a building for the House of Organ Music by 2023.

Religious liturgies are celebrated by priests of the Missionary Oblates of Mary Immaculate. Most are conducted in the Ukrainian language, while on some days they are conducted in Polish, Latin and in Spanish.

On the night of 3 September 2021, the church caught fire and was severely damaged. The fire destroyed the organ and damaged the interior of the church. A large chandelier also fell to the floor. There were no casualties. According to the Ministry of Culture and Information Policy, the fire broke out during an organ music rehearsal. The church has been shared between the Roman Catholic Church of Ukraine and the National Organ and Chamber Music Hall of Ukraine, which hosted organ concerts. Significant damage to the building was avoided, but the organ was lost.

The church's stained glass windows were damaged during a Russian missile attack on 20 December 2024 during the Russian invasion of Ukraine.

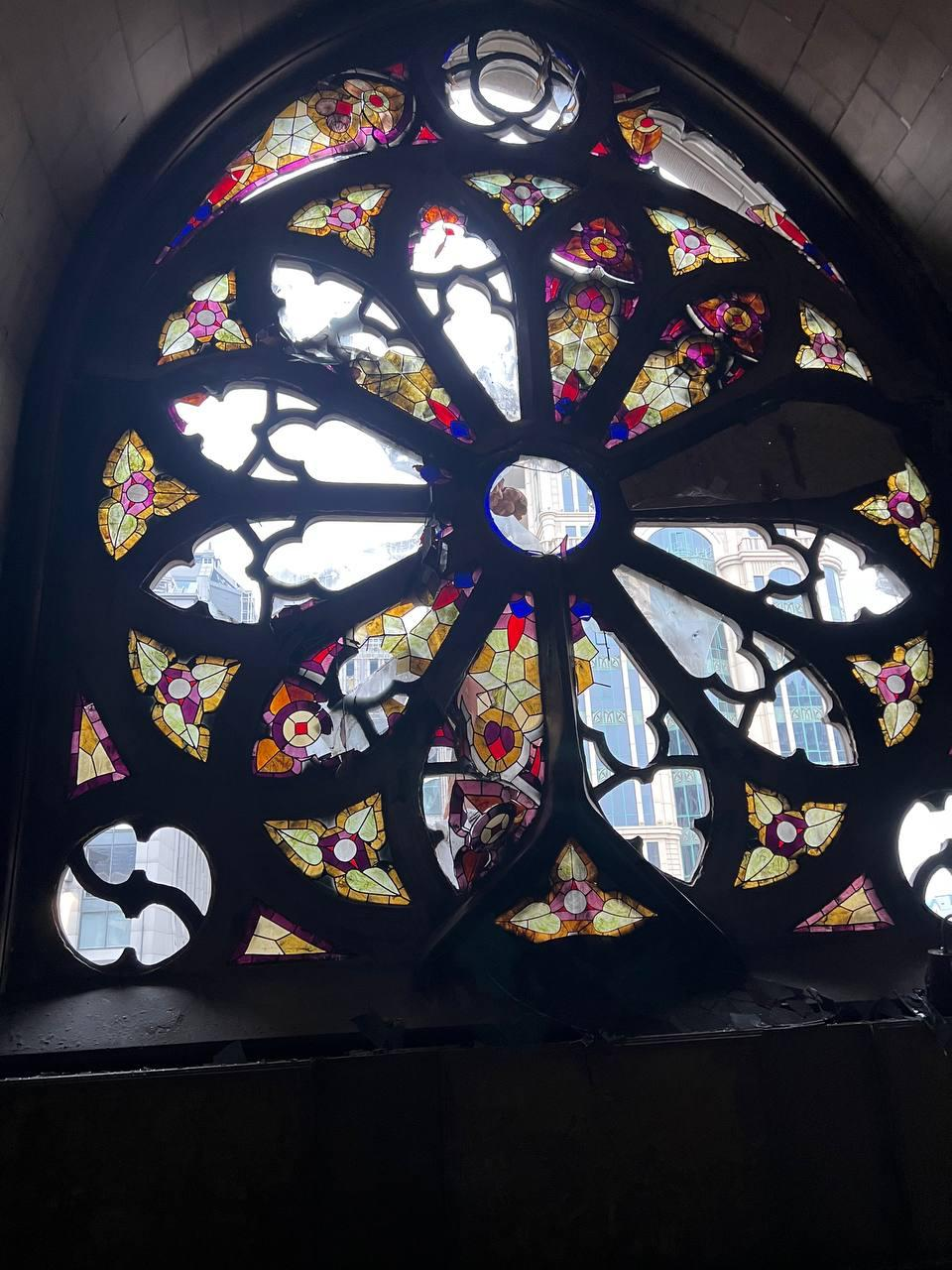
Damage, view from inside (December 2024)

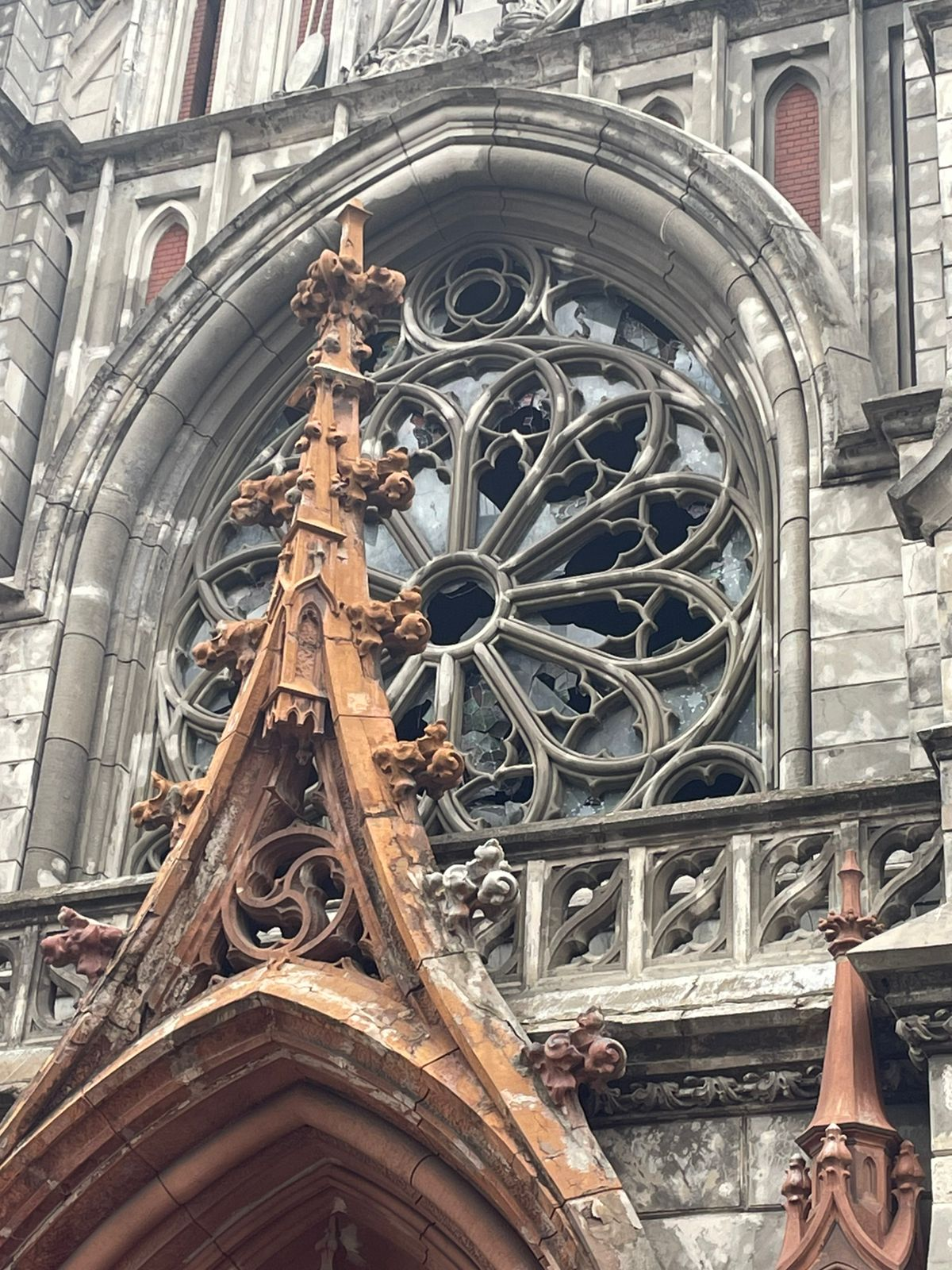
Damage, view from outside (December 2024)

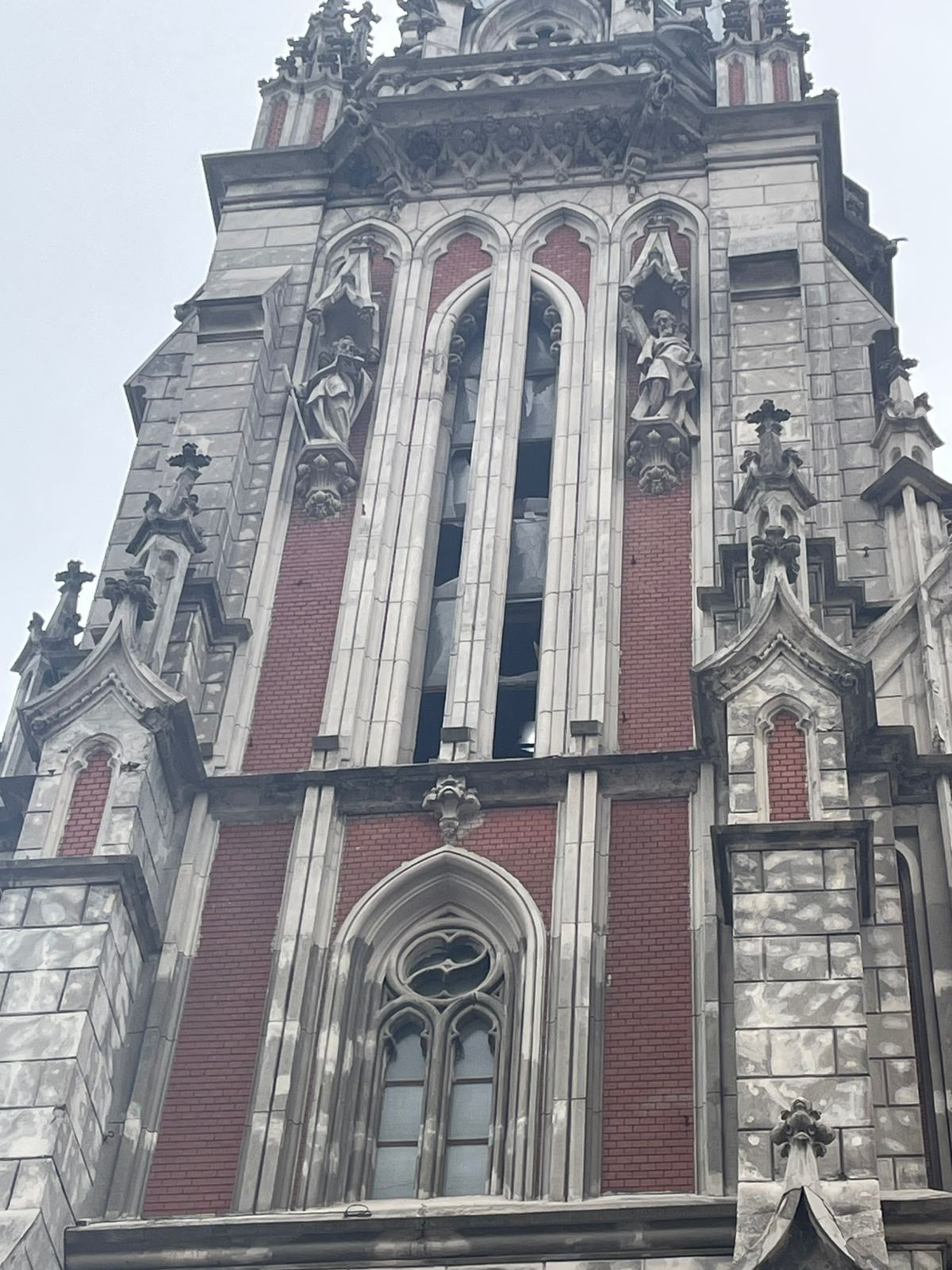
Damage, general view (December 2024)

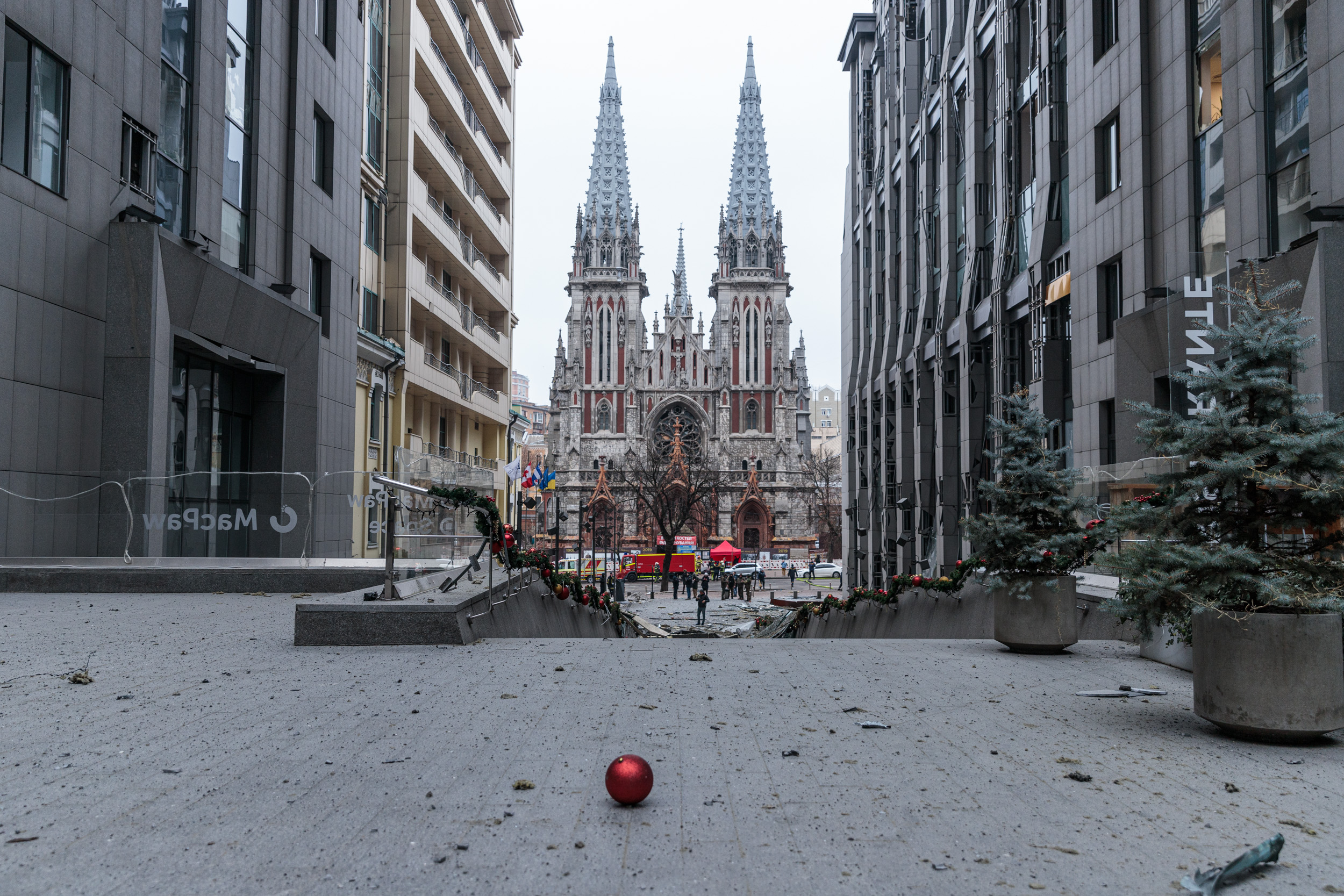
View from the building that was hit (December 2024)

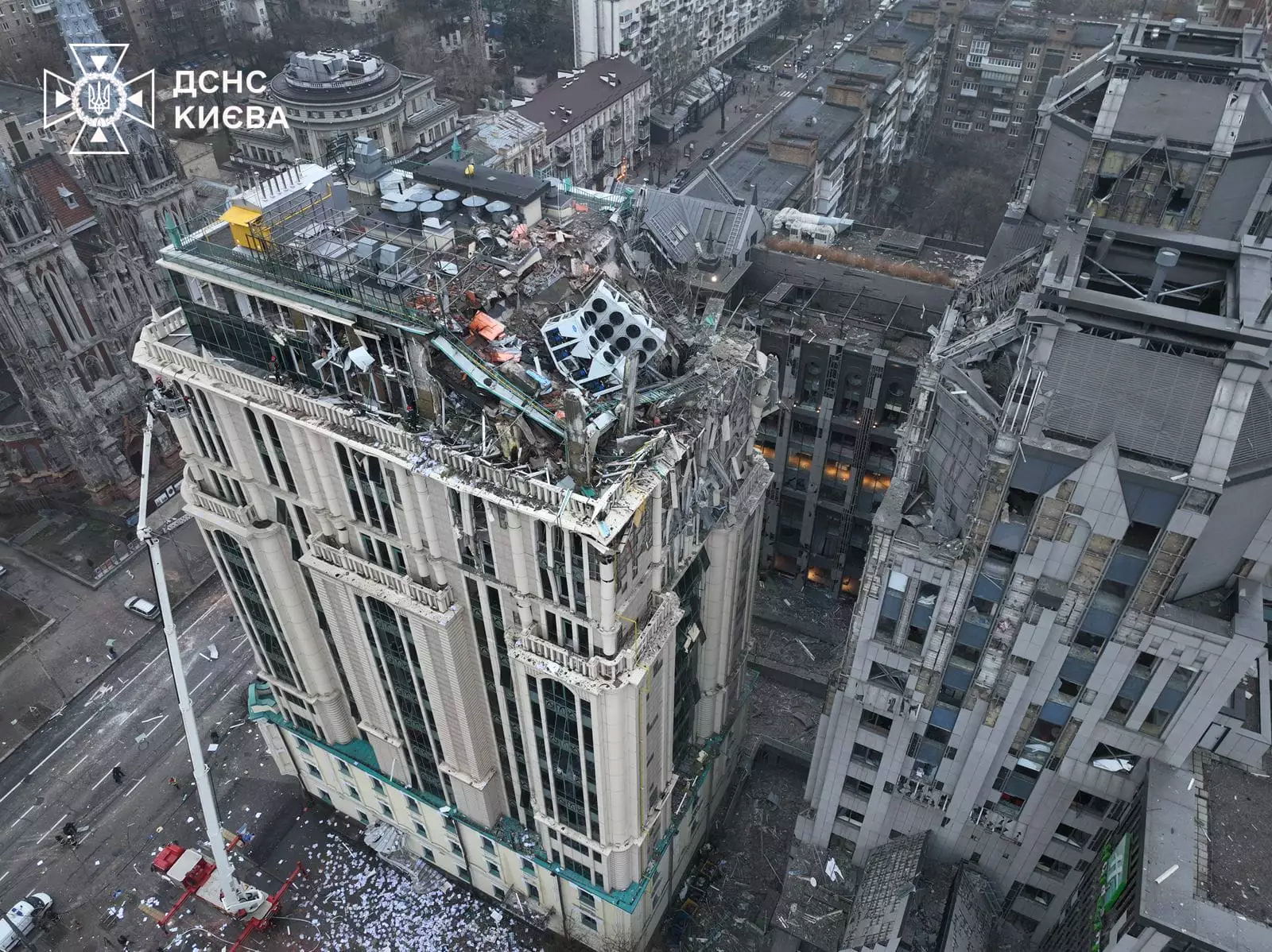
General view (December 2024)
