= Emilio Sala (sculptor) =

Italian sculptor (1864–1920)

Emilio Sala, also known as Elio Salya (Ukrainian: Еліо Саля; 30 April 1864 – 10 January 1920) was an Italian-born sculptor and painter who spent most of his working life in Kyiv, Ukraine.

== Biography ==
Sala was born in Milan. In 1890, he and his brother were invited to Russia to work on the Moika Palace in Saint Petersburg. After two years of work there, he heard about the plans to build a new museum in Kyiv and offered his services. As Italian artists were very popular in the Russian Empire, he was accepted and began to create designs.

From 1897 to 1905, he produced griffins and lions for what is now called the National Art Museum of Ukraine. During that project, he struck up a very fruitful working relationship with the architect Władysław Horodecki. He also designed various decorations for the Karaite Synagogue, the National Bank of Ukraine, St. Nicholas Roman Catholic Cathedral, Igor Sikorsky Kyiv Polytechnic Institute and the National Opera of Ukraine.

Unquestionably, though, his best known work is on the House with Chimaeras (also designed by Horodecki); a flamboyant Art Nouveau-style building for which Sala created fantastical cement renderings of elephants, panthers, rhinoceroses, giant frogs and other exotic animals.

In addition to his architectural work, he taught sculpture at an art school and a trade college. At the outbreak of World War I, he returned to Milan, where he died six years later.

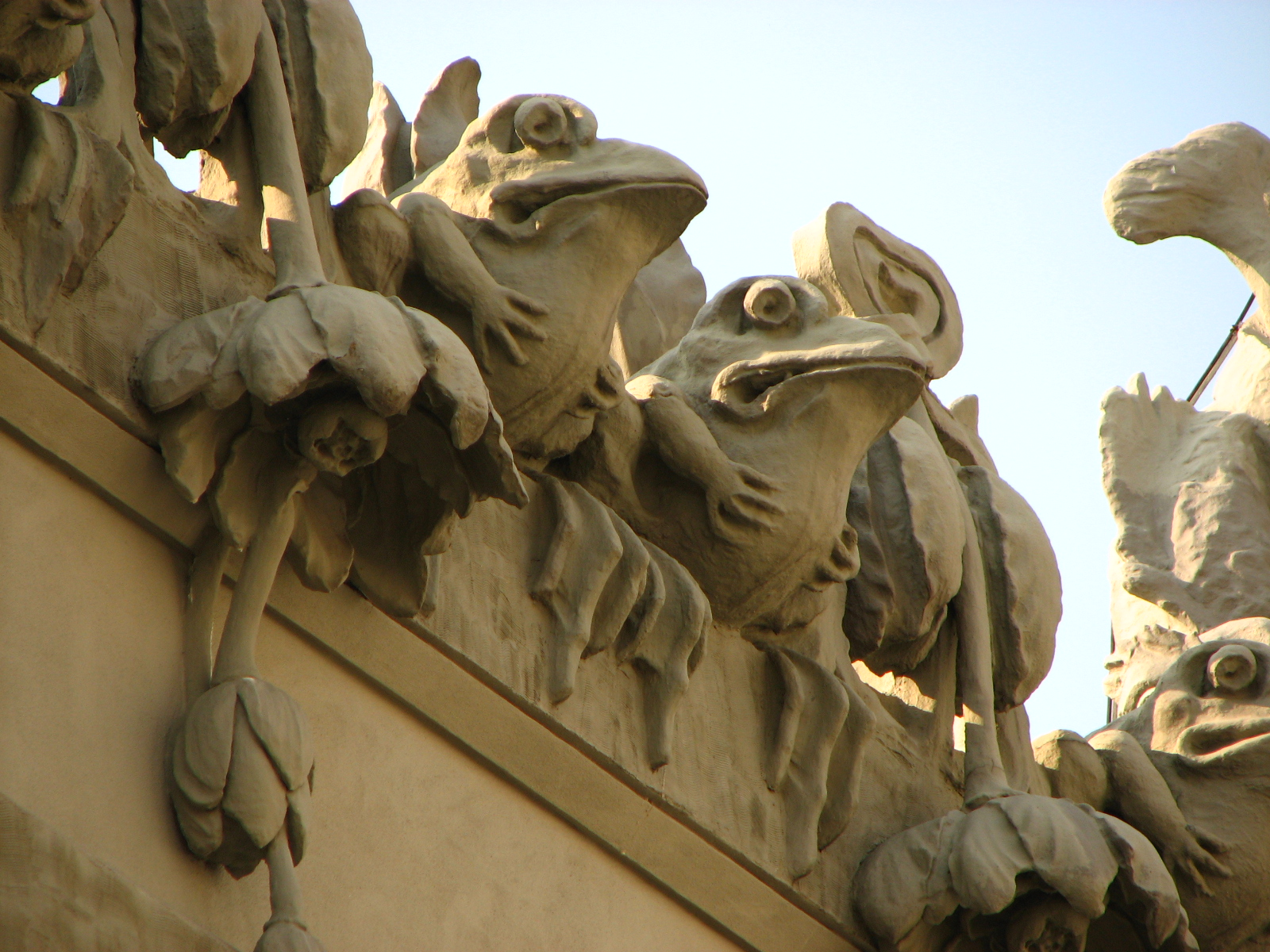
Frogs and lotus flowers, House with Chimaeras, Kyiv, 1902

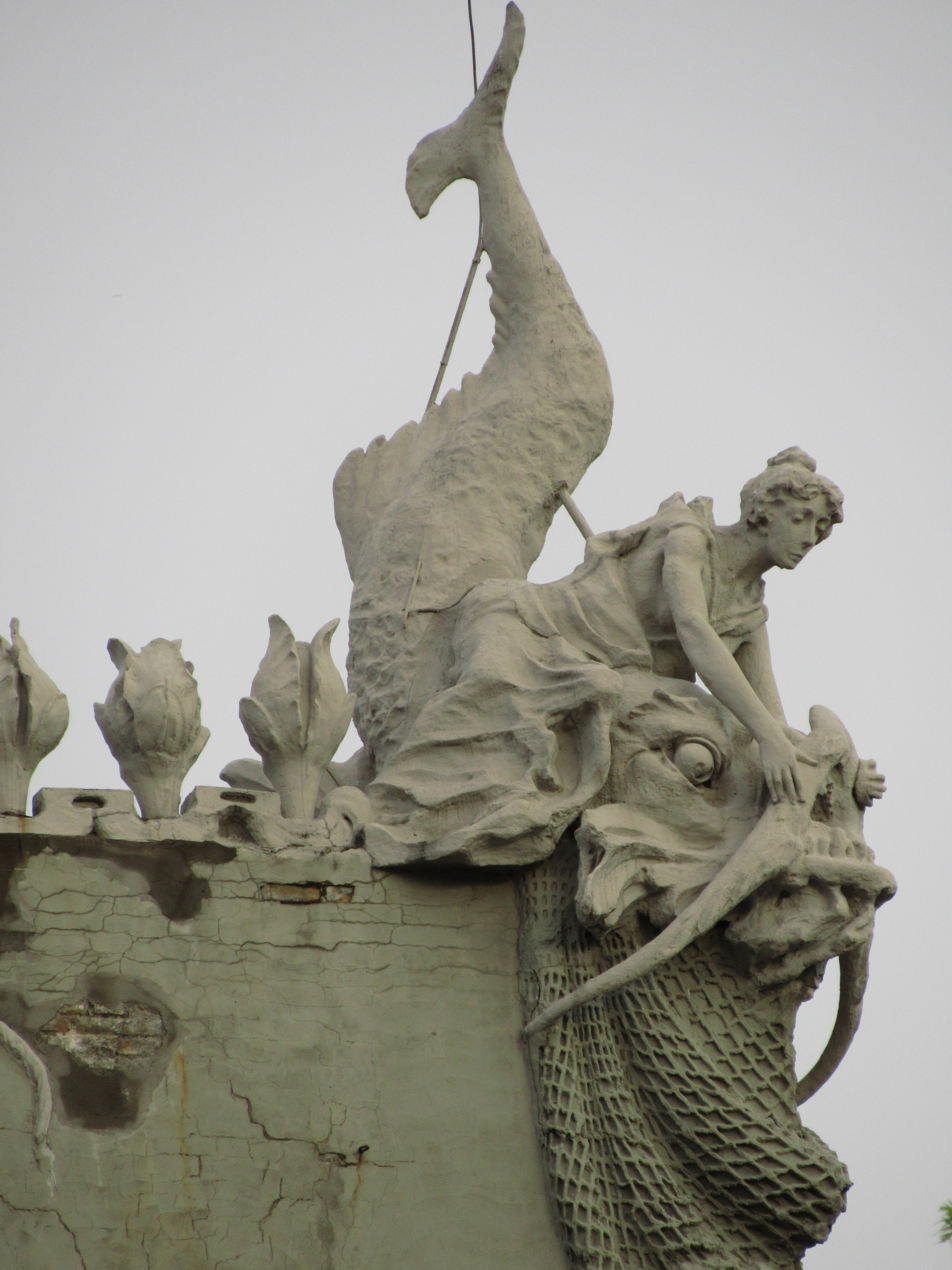
Woman and catfish, House with Chimaeras, Kyiv, 1902

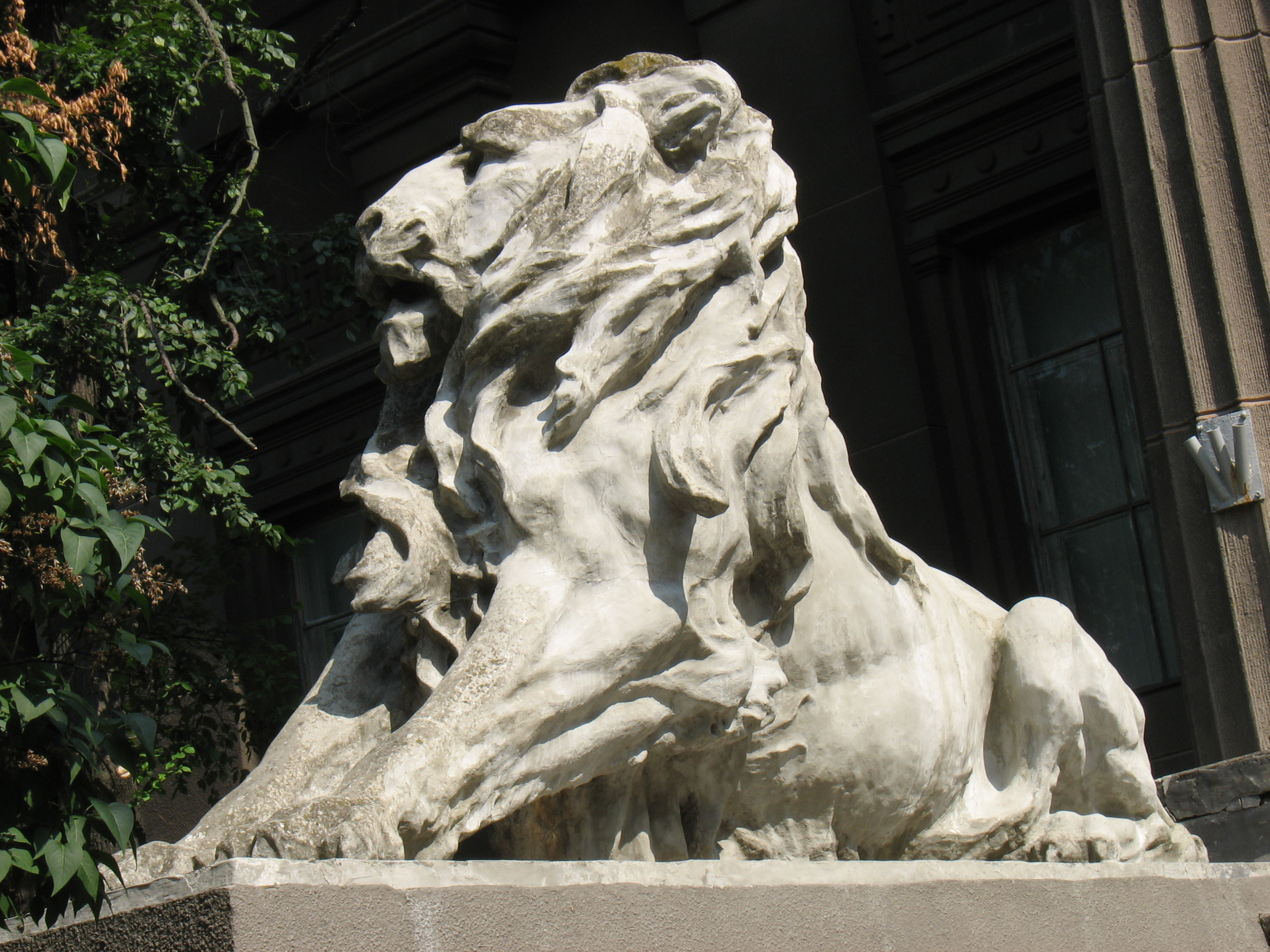
Lion, National Art Museum, Kyiv, 1904

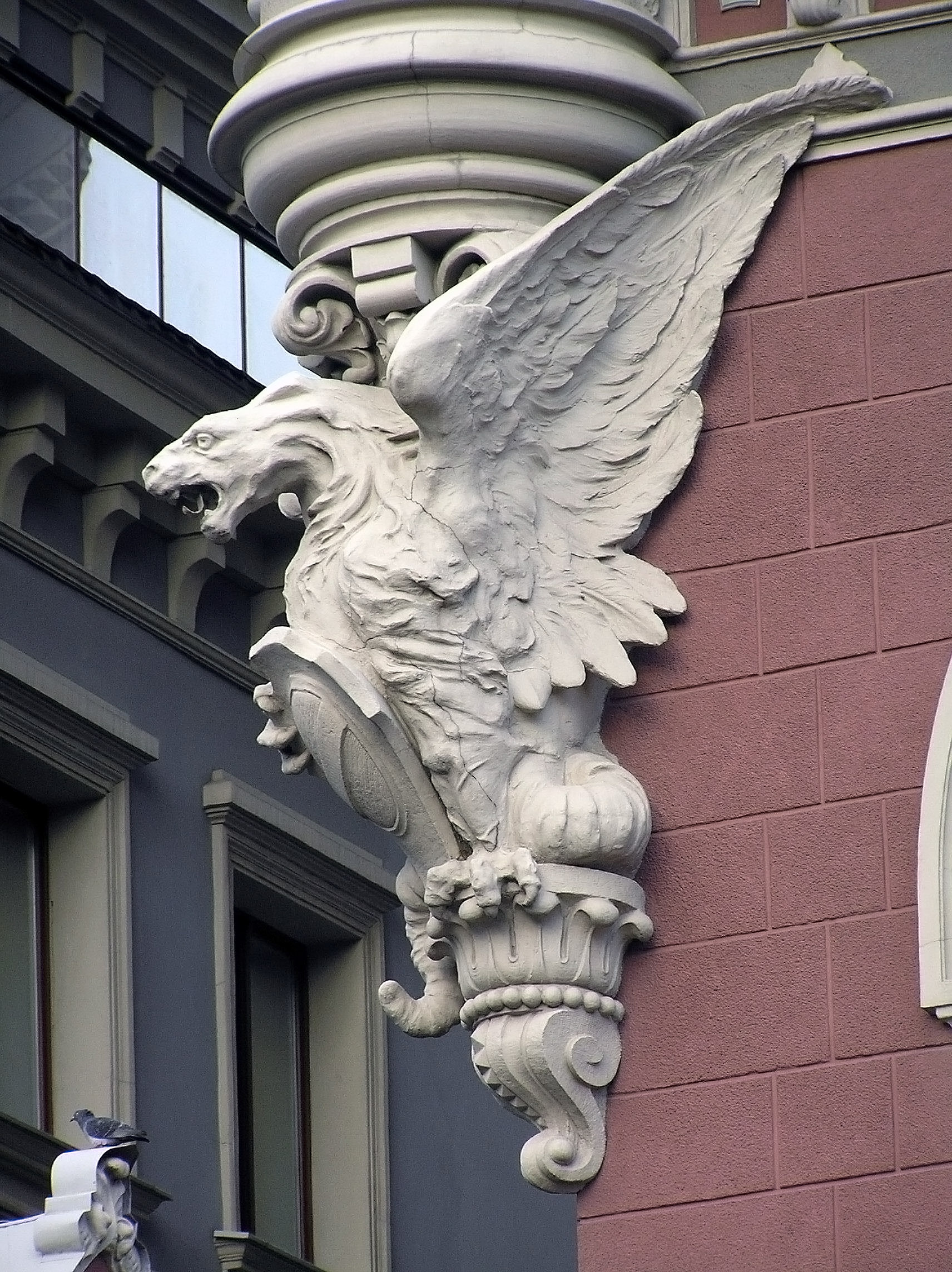
Griffin, National Bank, Kyiv, 1905
