= Władysław Horodecki =

Polish architect (1863–1930)

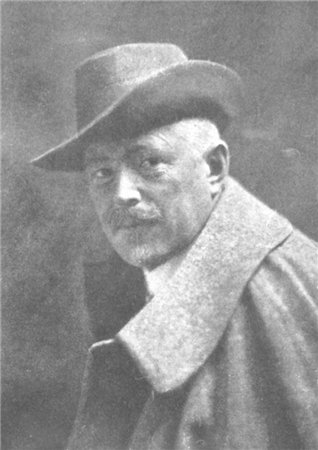
- Born: Leszek Dezydery Horodecki; May 23, 1863; Sholudki, Podolia Governorate, Russian Empire
- Died: January 3, 1930 (aged 66); Tehran, Iran
- Resting place: Doulab Cemetery
- Citizenship: Russian Empire, Poland
- Occupation: Architect
- Buildings: House with Chimaeras (Kyiv), St. Nicholas Cathedral (Kyiv), National Art Museum (Kyiv), Karaite Kenesa
- Design: Art Nouveau, Moorish Revival, and Gothic Revival styles

Władysław Horodecki (born Leszek Dezydery Horodecki; Russian: Владислав Владиславович Городецкий; Ukrainian: Владислав Владиславович Городецький; 4 June [O.S. 23 May] 1863 – January 3, 1930) was a Polish architect active in the Russian Empire and later in the Second Polish Republic. He is best known for his contributions in the urban development of Kyiv, with buildings such as the House with Chimaeras, the St. Nicholas Roman Catholic Cathedral, the Karaite Kenesa, and the National Art Museum of Ukraine.

In Kyiv, Horodecki often worked along with a sculptor from Milan, Emilio Sala, who was an instructor at the Kyiv City College.

== Life and career ==
=== Early life and education ===
Kornic coat of arms

Horodecki was born into a noble Polish szlachta family of the Kornic coat of arms in the village of Szołudki in the Russian Partition of Poland (Sholudky, now Vinnytsia Oblast, Ukraine). His parents were Władysław Horodecki and Leopoldyna Horodecka née Gluzińska. His ancestors were big landowners in the Podolia region. He was born in the estate of the Gluziński family, and then his parents moved with him to the estate of the Horodecki family in Zhabokrych, 20 kilometres (12 mi) from Szołudki. Władysław Horodecki was baptised in Kopiivka. His uncles, Artur and Szczęsny, took part in the Polish January Uprising against Russian rule, and as punishment were deported to Siberia.

From 1879 he attended a gymnasium in Odesa, and then in 1885 he enrolled at the Imperial Academy of Arts in St. Petersburg, which he graduated in 1890.

=== Career in Ukraine and Poland ===
After 1890, Horodecki moved to Kyiv, where he lived for almost 30 years. He designed a number of buildings, mainly in Kyiv, Cherkasy, and Podolia.

As a result of World War I, both Poland and Ukraine gained independence, and then Poland repelled the Soviets in the Polish-Soviet War in 1920, whereas Ukraine, including Kyiv, fell to the Soviets, thus Horodecki moved to Warsaw, Poland. In Poland, Horodecki headed an American Project Bureau, "Henry Ulan & Co." Some of his designs were built including a water tower and trade rows in Piotrków Trybunalski, a meat factory in Lublin, a bath house in Zgierz, and a casino building in Otwock.

=== Persia ===
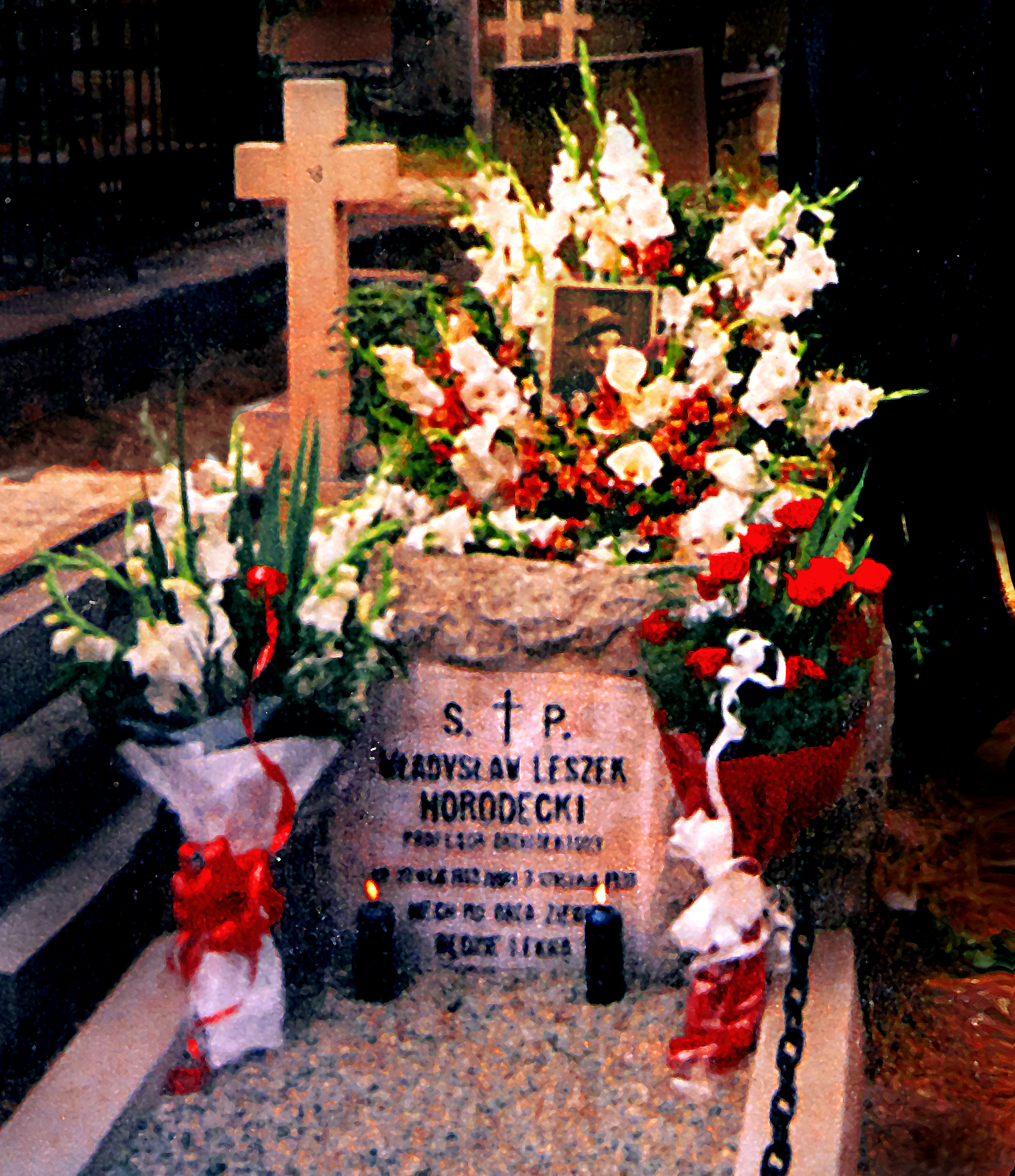
Horodecki's tomb in Doulab Cemetery

In 1928, on the invitation of the same company, Horodecki moved to Tehran, becoming a chief architect of the Syndicate on the Design of Persian Railways. He designed in particular the building of the Tehran railway station. In 1930 he died and was buried at Doulab Catholic Cemetery in Tehran. His epitaph is inscribed in Polish with only the phrase Profesor architektury. Niech mu obca ziemia będzie lekka., which translates into English as "Professor of architecture. Let the foreign soil be light for him."

== Remembrance ==
One of Kyiv's streets, designed by Horodecki, (between Maidan Nezalezhnosti and House with Chimaeras) was named after him in 1996 as vulytsia Arkhitektora Horodetskoho. The street had been called ulitsa Nikolayevskaya, and in Soviet times it was known as vulytsia Karla Marksa, after Karl Marx.

In 2004, a statue honouring Horodecki was unveiled in Kyiv at 15 Khreshchatyk.

In 2011, Horodecki's bust made of white marble was unveiled in the town of Nemyriv, close to the architect's birthplace in Szołudki. The monument features Horodecki's name as well as his years of birth and death.

In 2013, a 5-hryvnia commemorative coin depicting Horodecki was issued in Ukraine on the 150 anniversary of the architect's birth.

In 2025, a memorial plaque to Horodecki was unveiled in Otwock, Poland.

== Works ==
Works in Kyiv

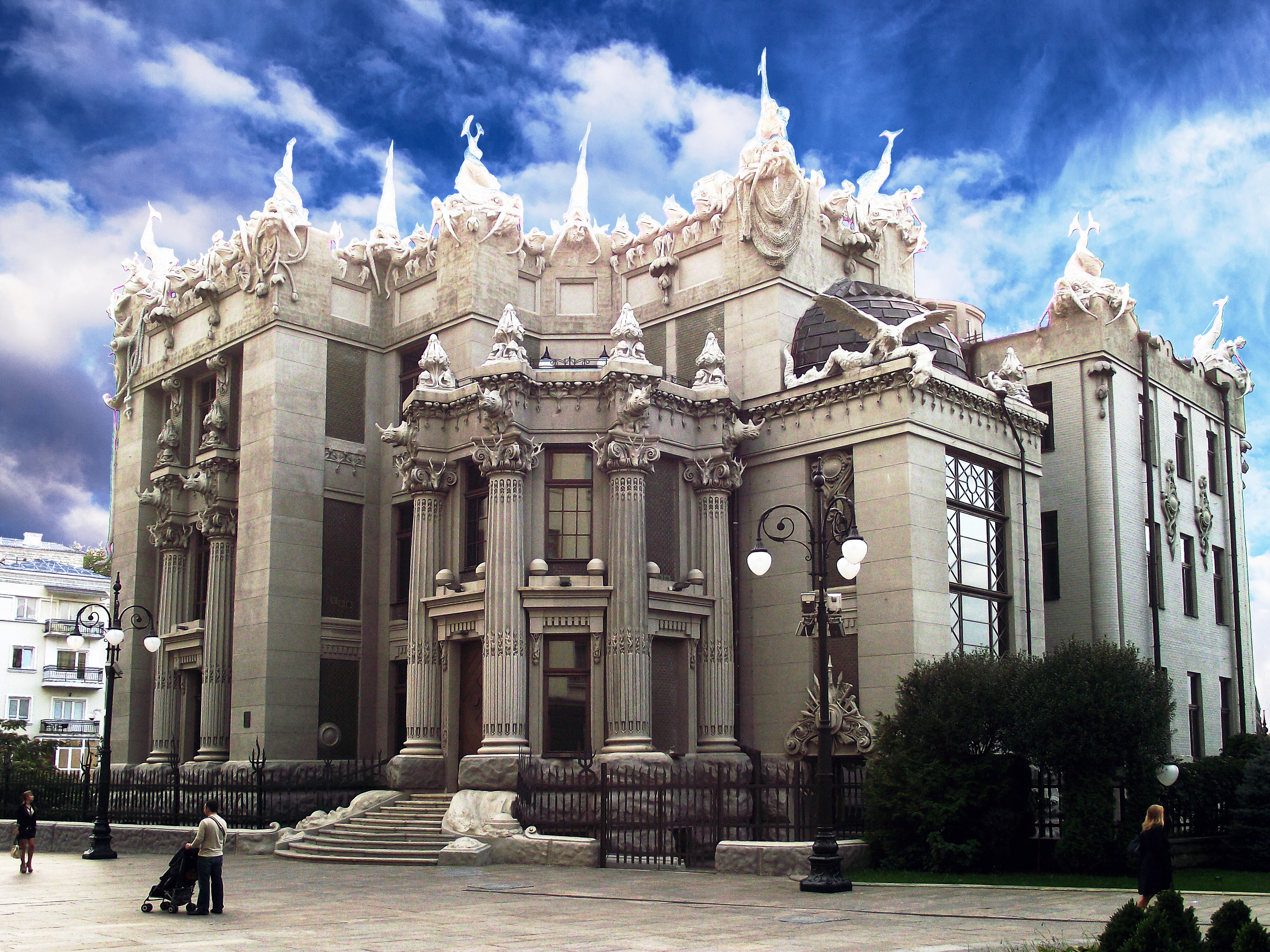
House with Chimaeras

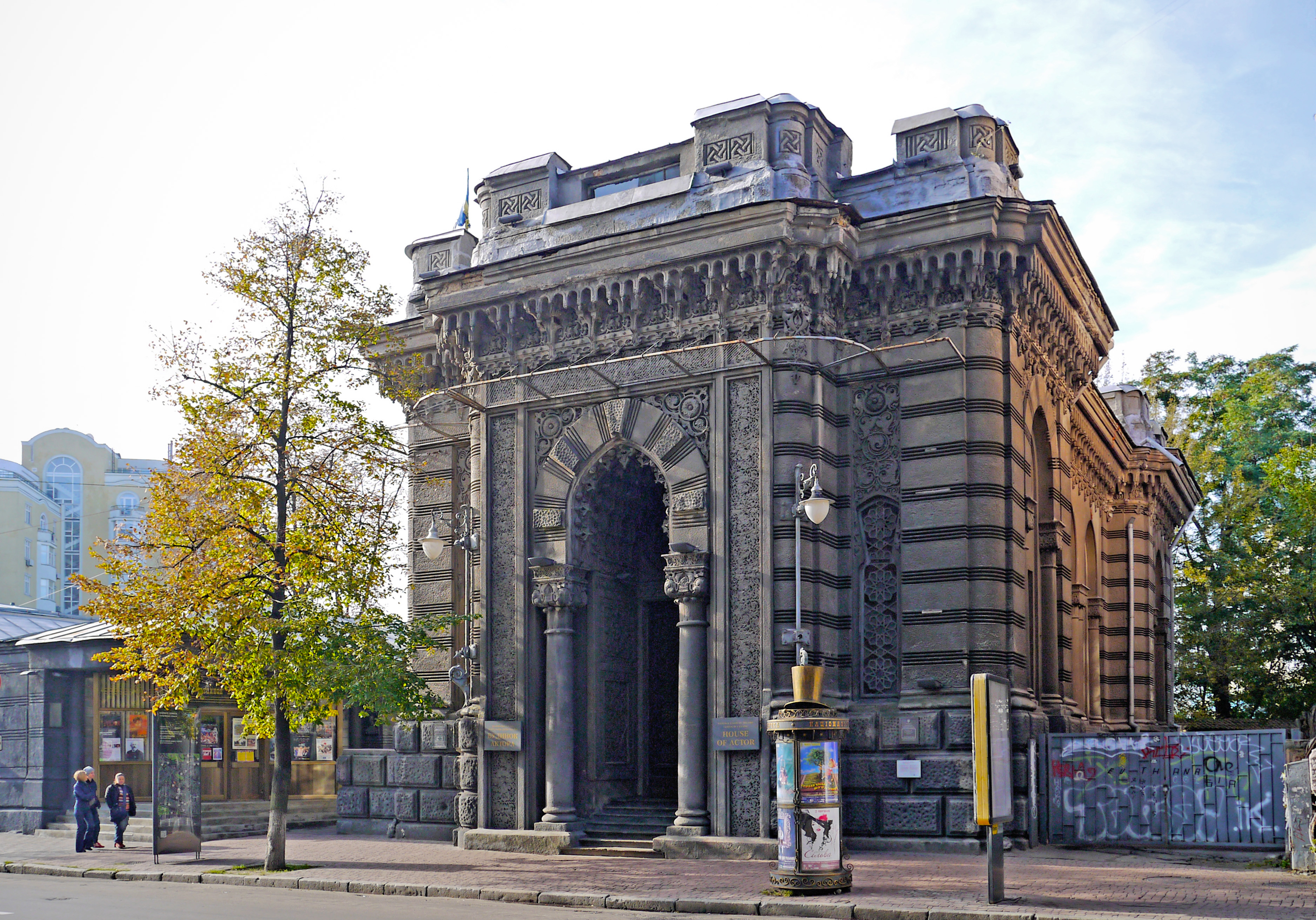
Karaite Kenesa

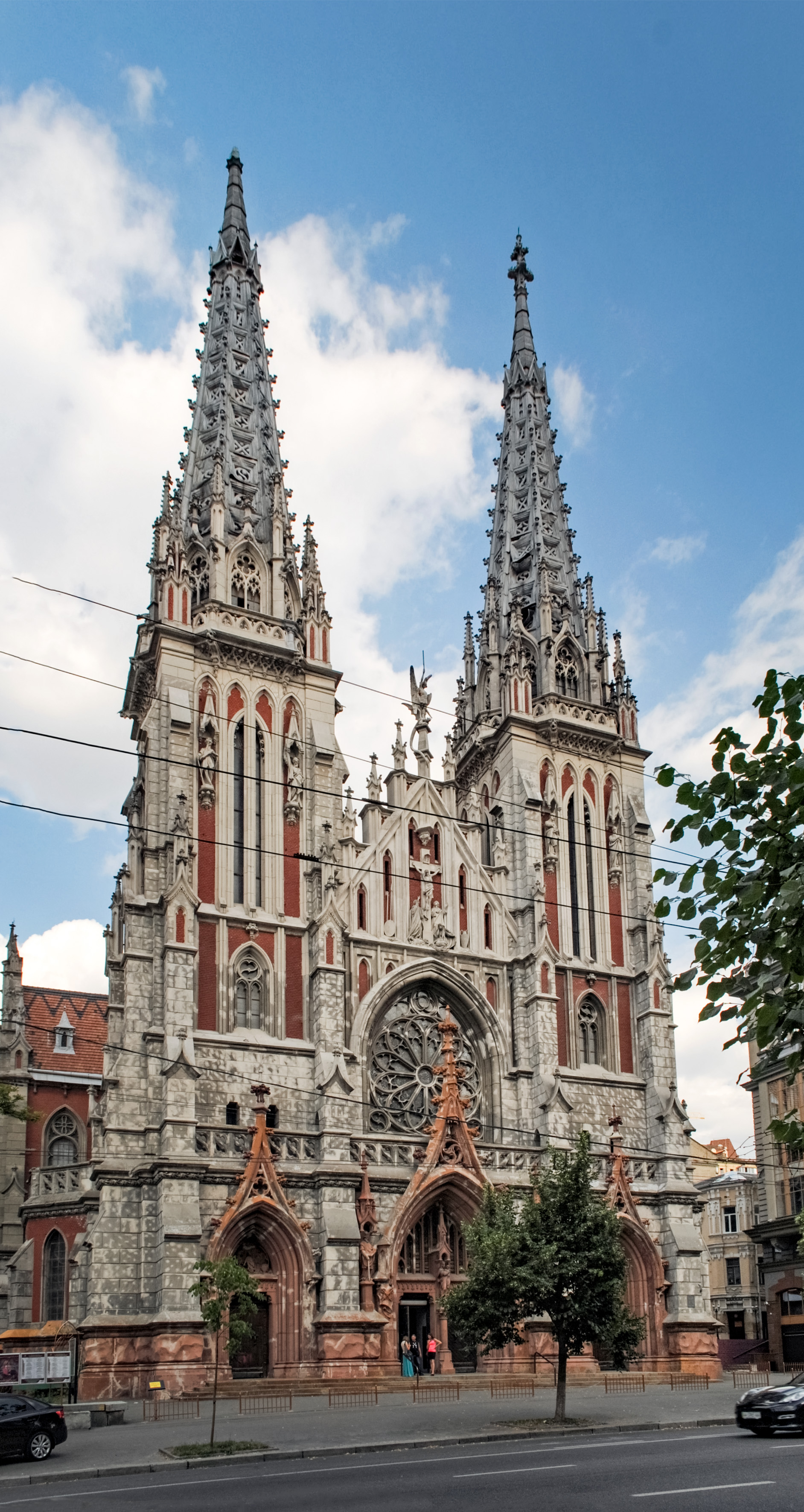
St. Nicholas Roman Catholic Cathedral

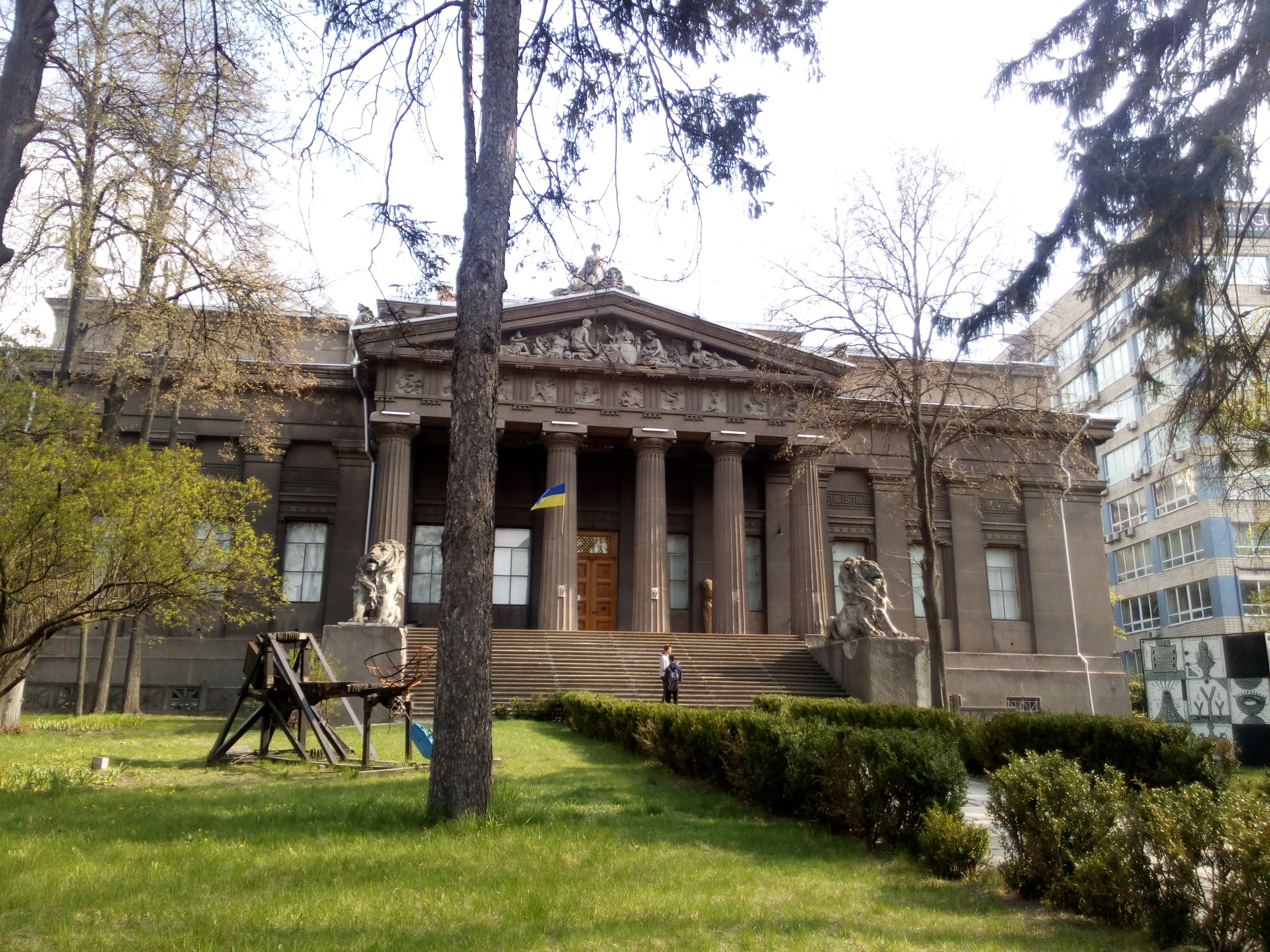
National Art Museum of Ukraine

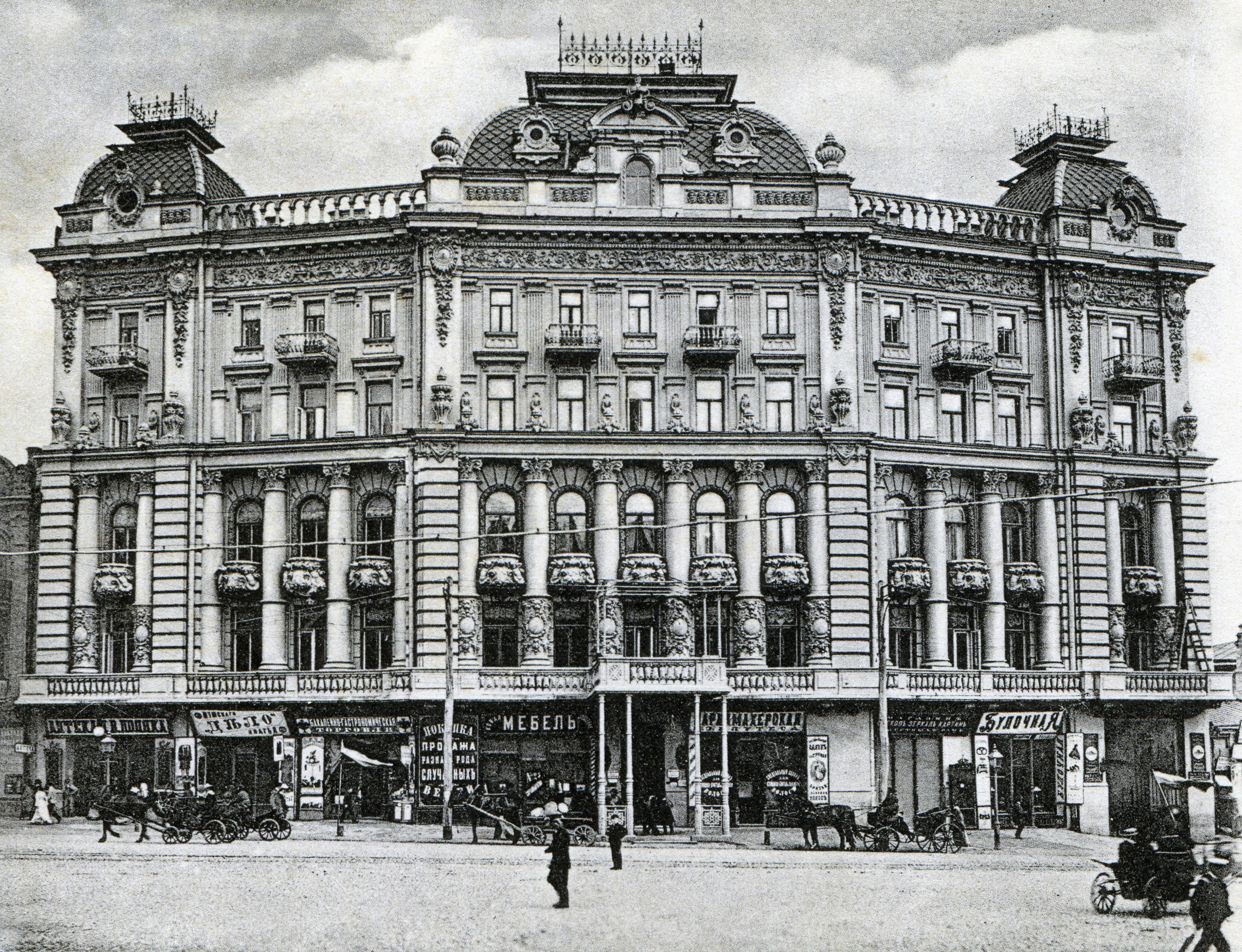
Bendersky House
Other works in Ukraine

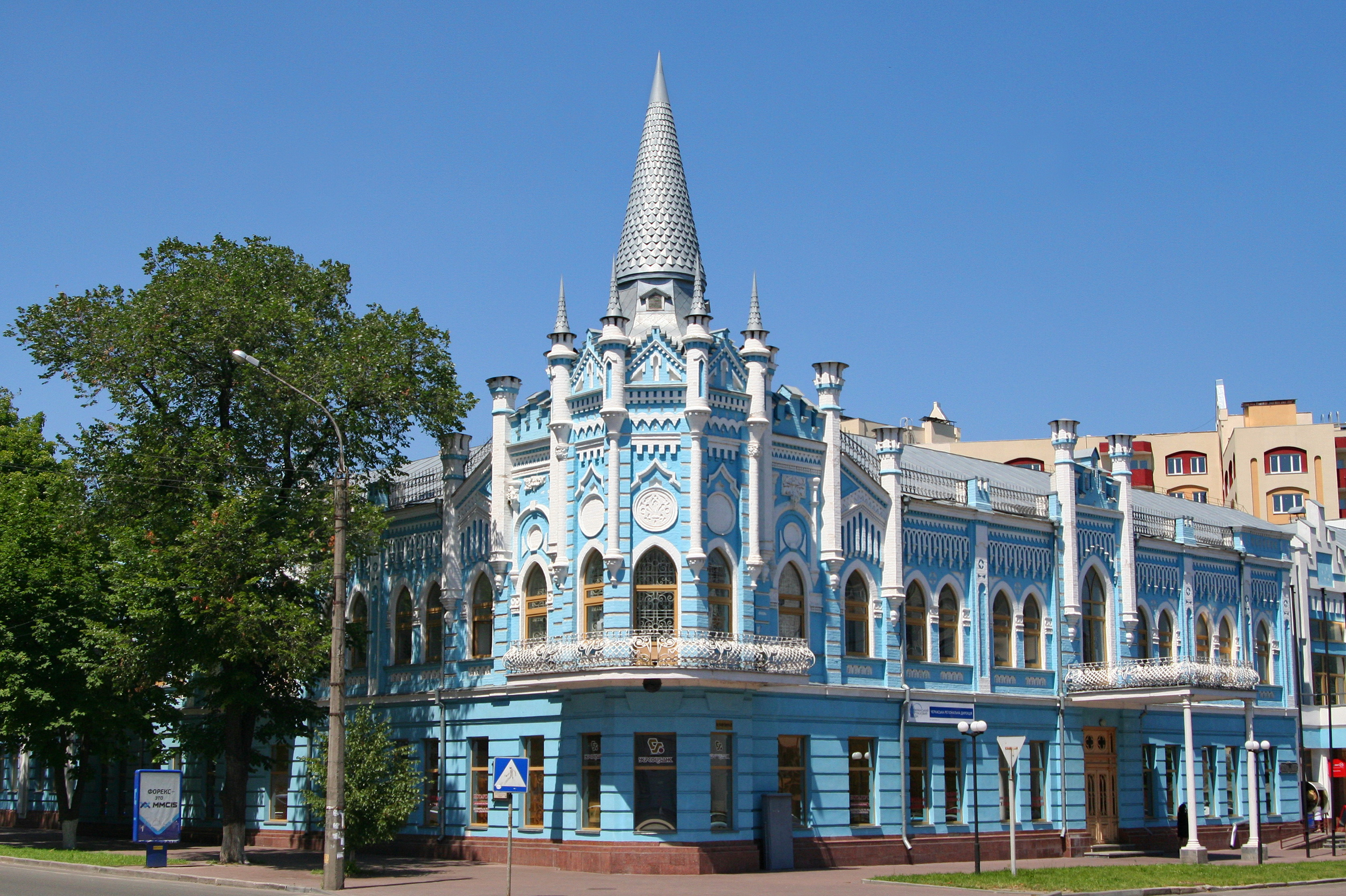
Blue Palace, Cherkasy

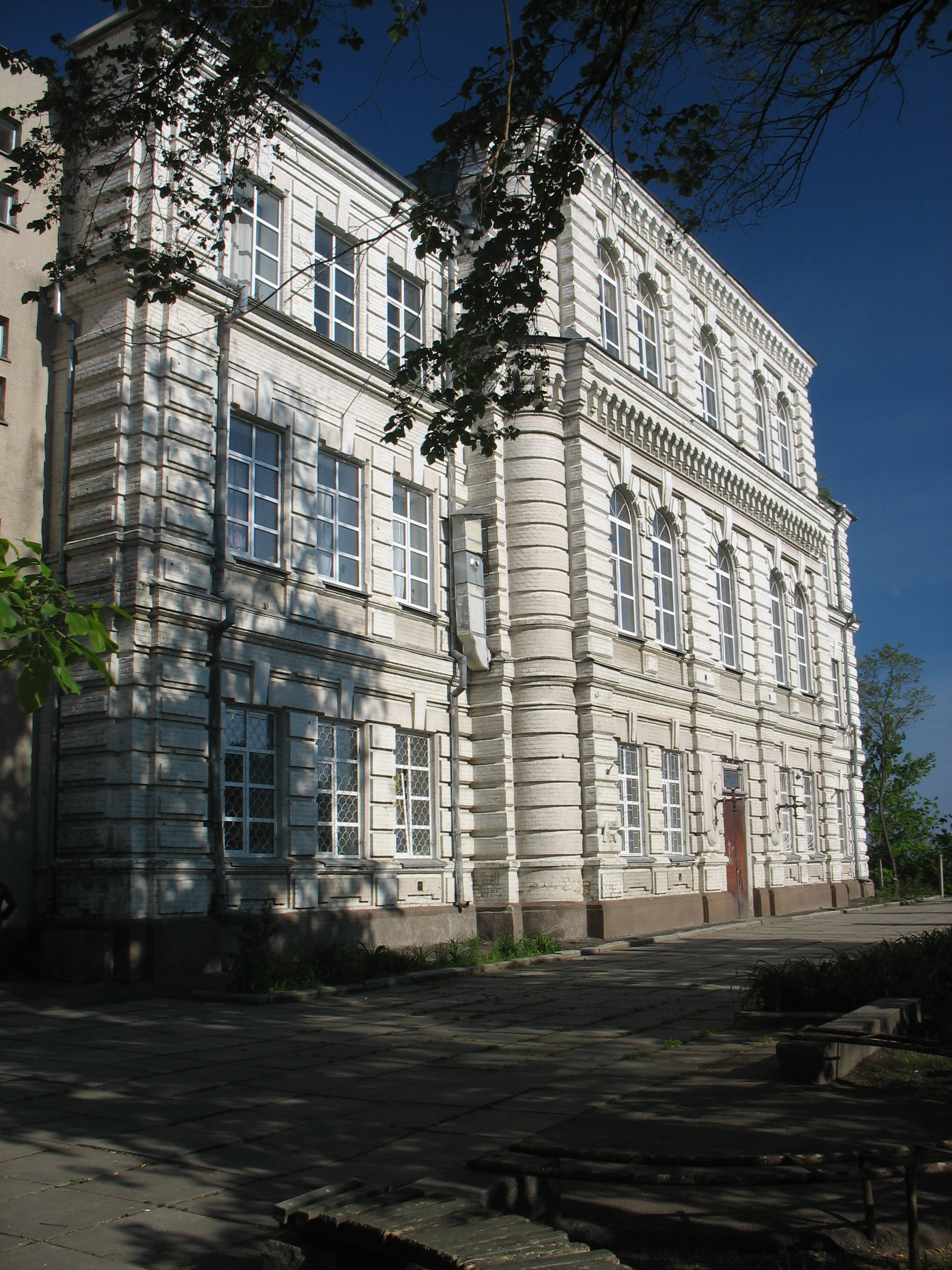
Music college, Cherkasy

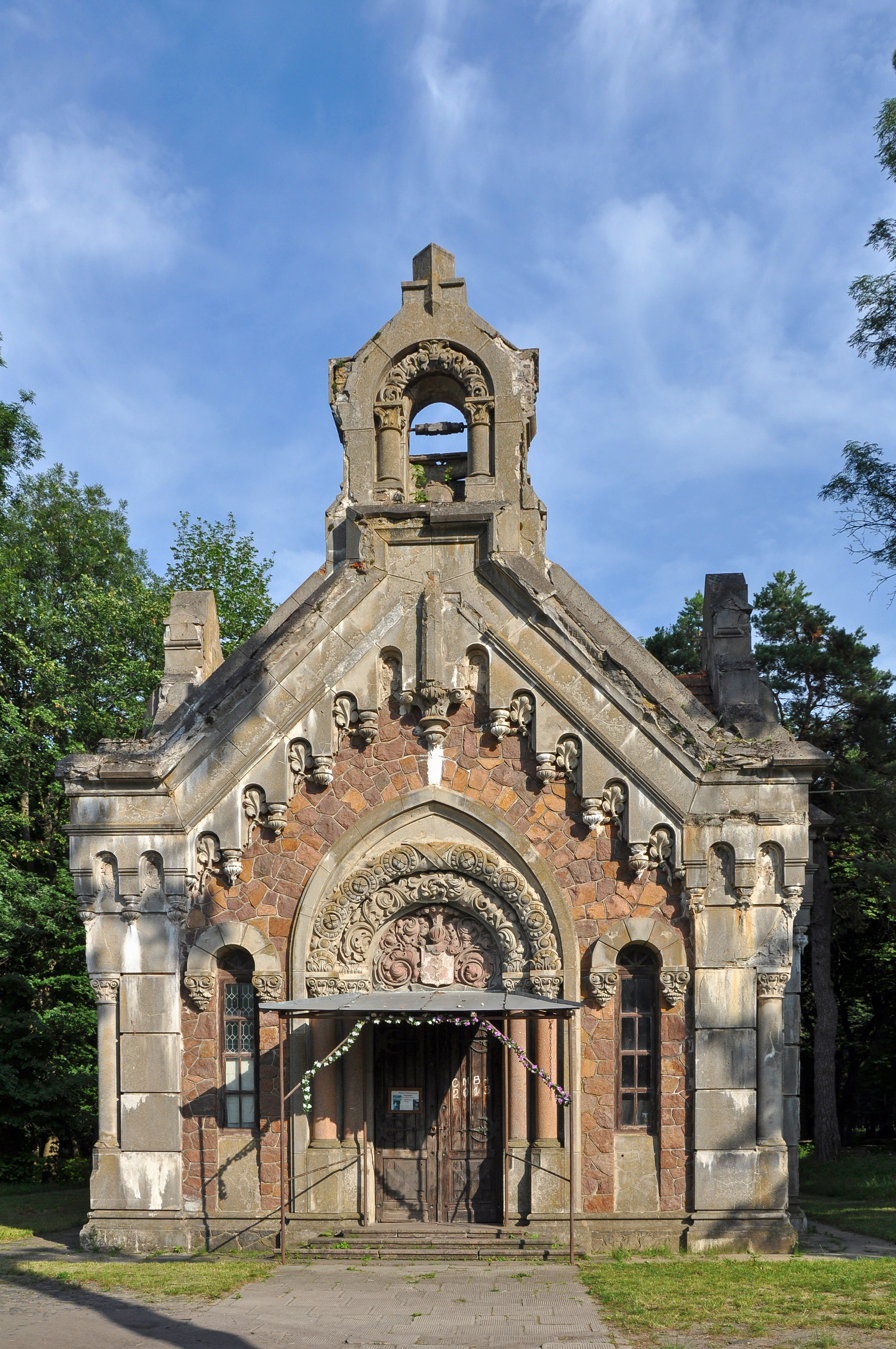
Potocki Chapel, Pechera

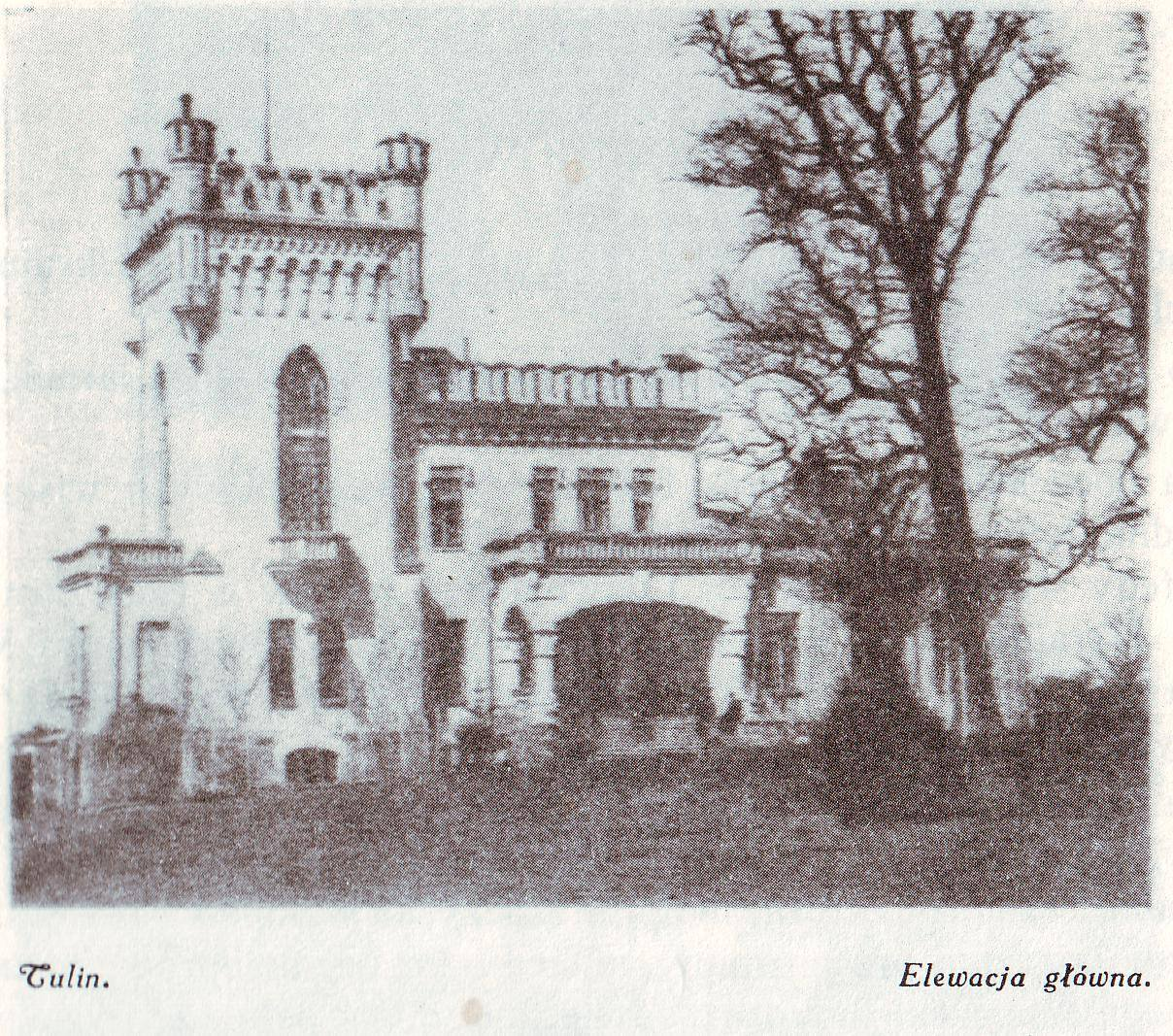
Dobrowolski Palace, Tulin

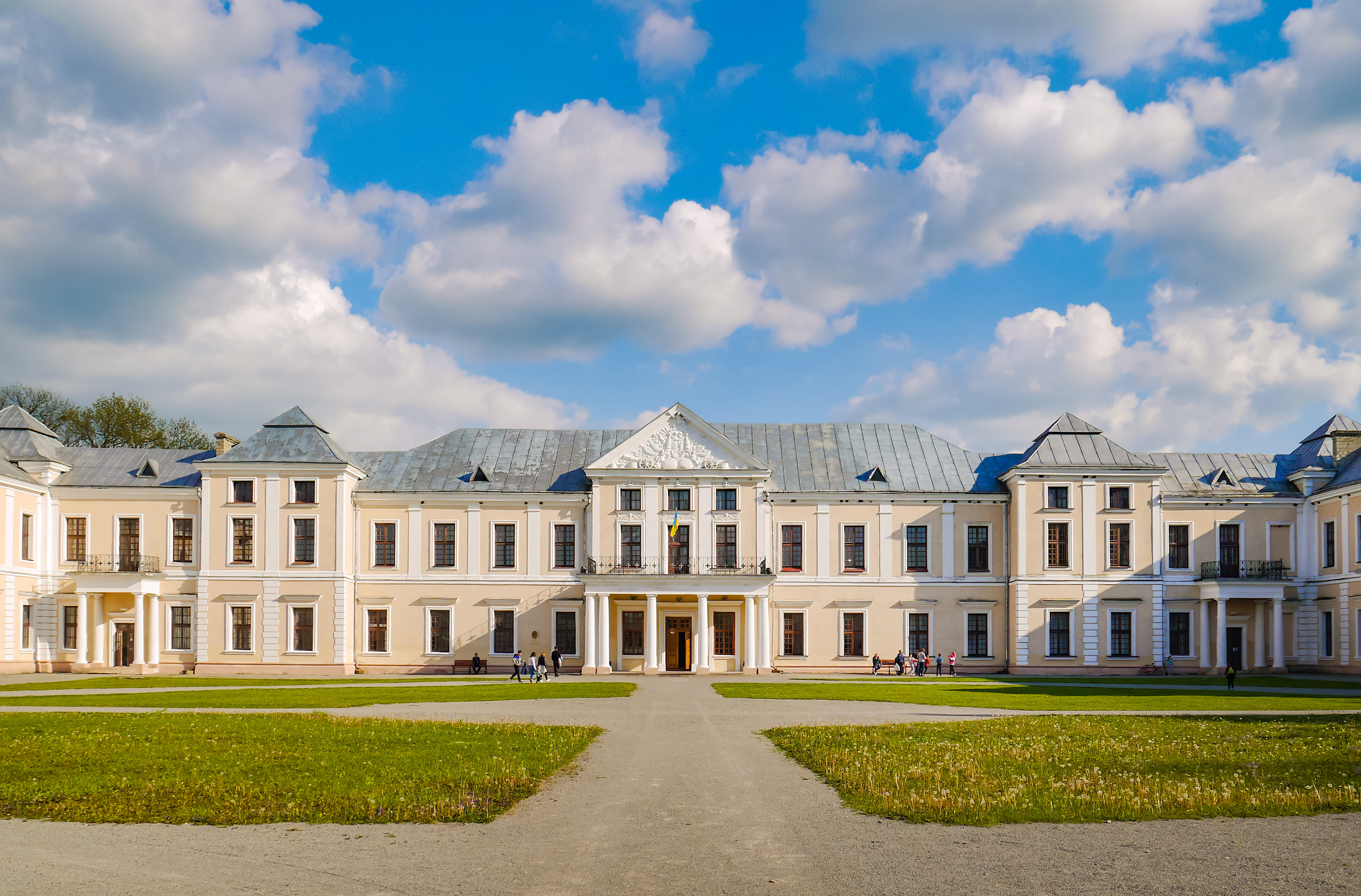
Vyshnivets Palace (reconstructed by Horodecki)
Works in Poland and Iran

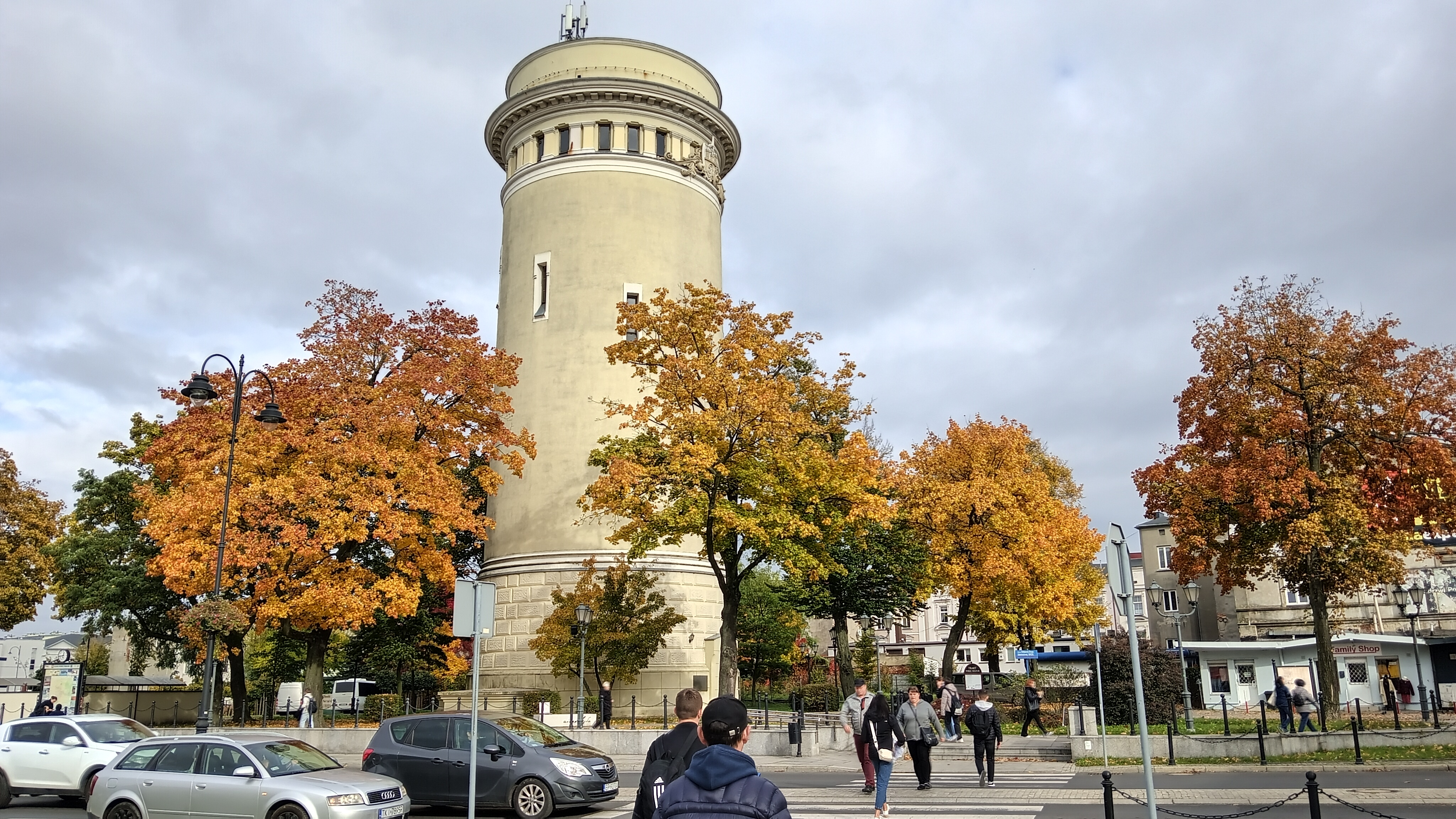
Water tower in Piotrków Trybunalski

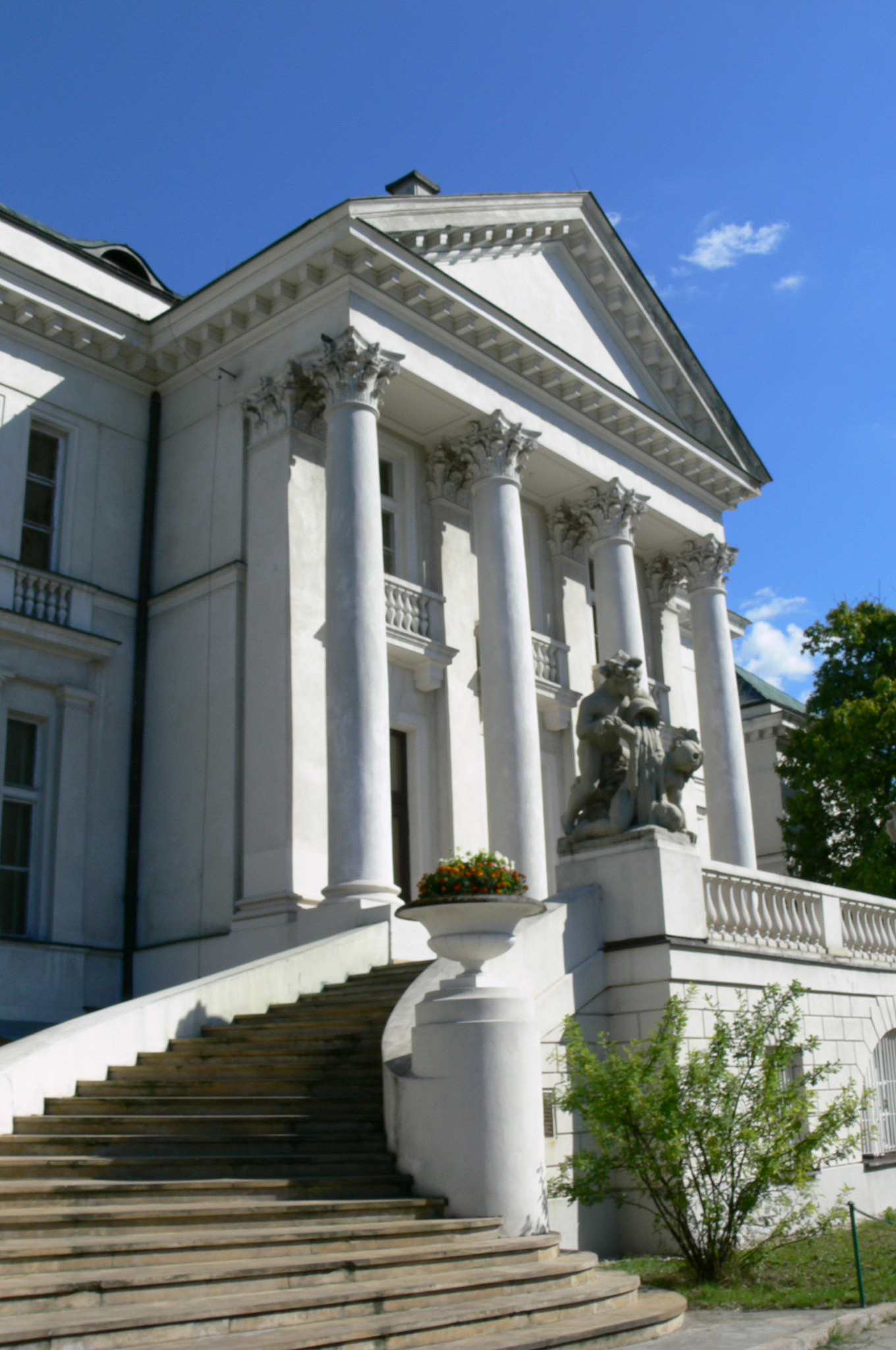
Otwock casino

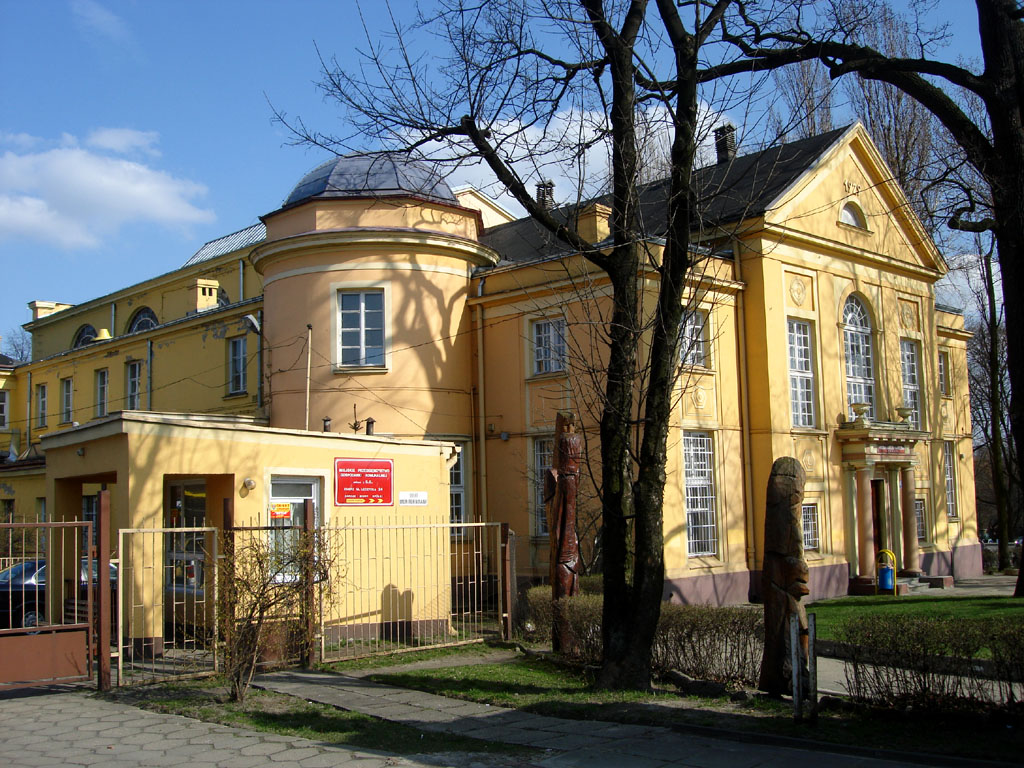
Bath house in Zgierz

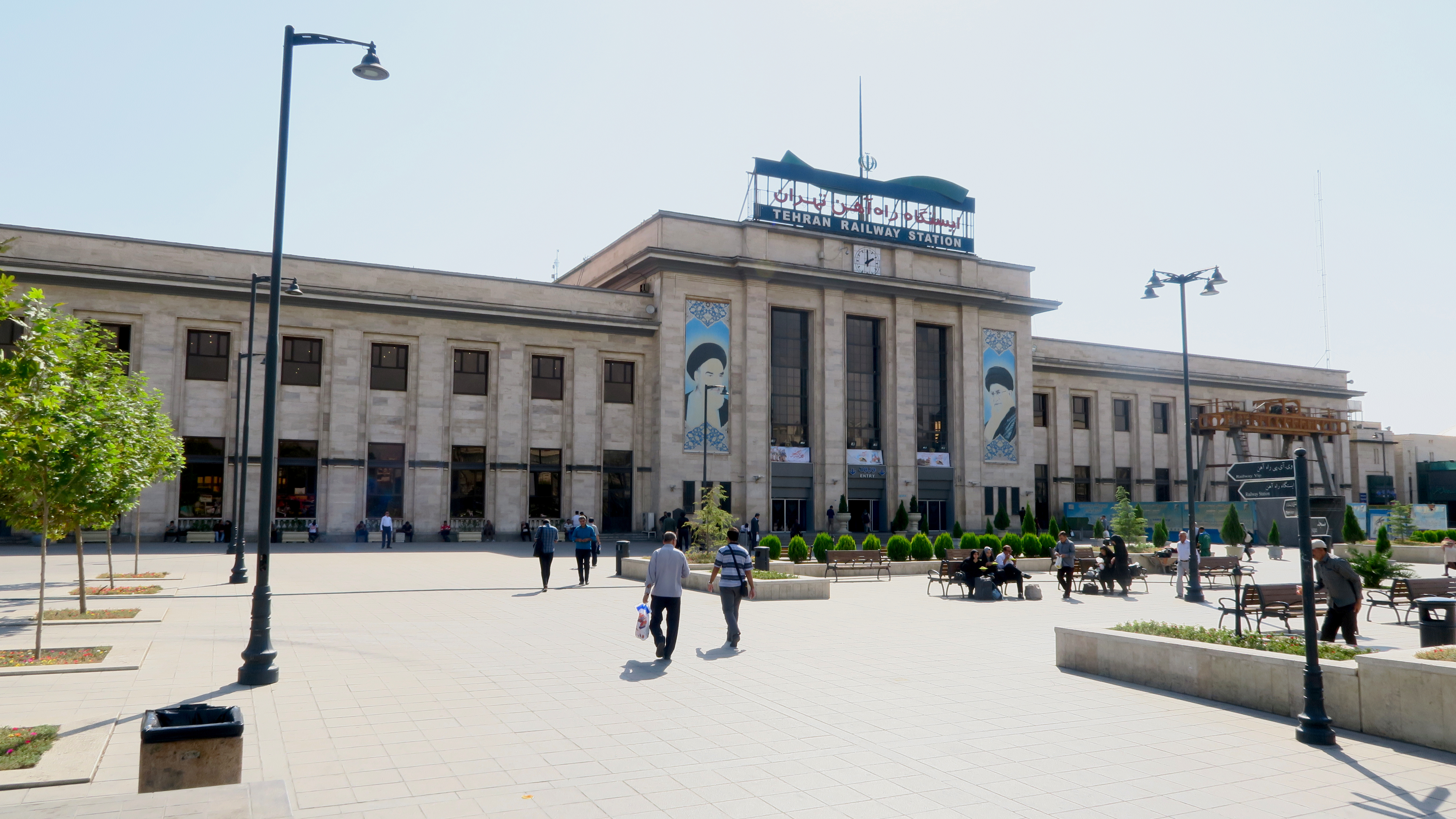
Tehran Railway Station

== See also ==
- List of Polish architects
- Ukrainian architecture
