= Anton Strauss =

Russian businessman

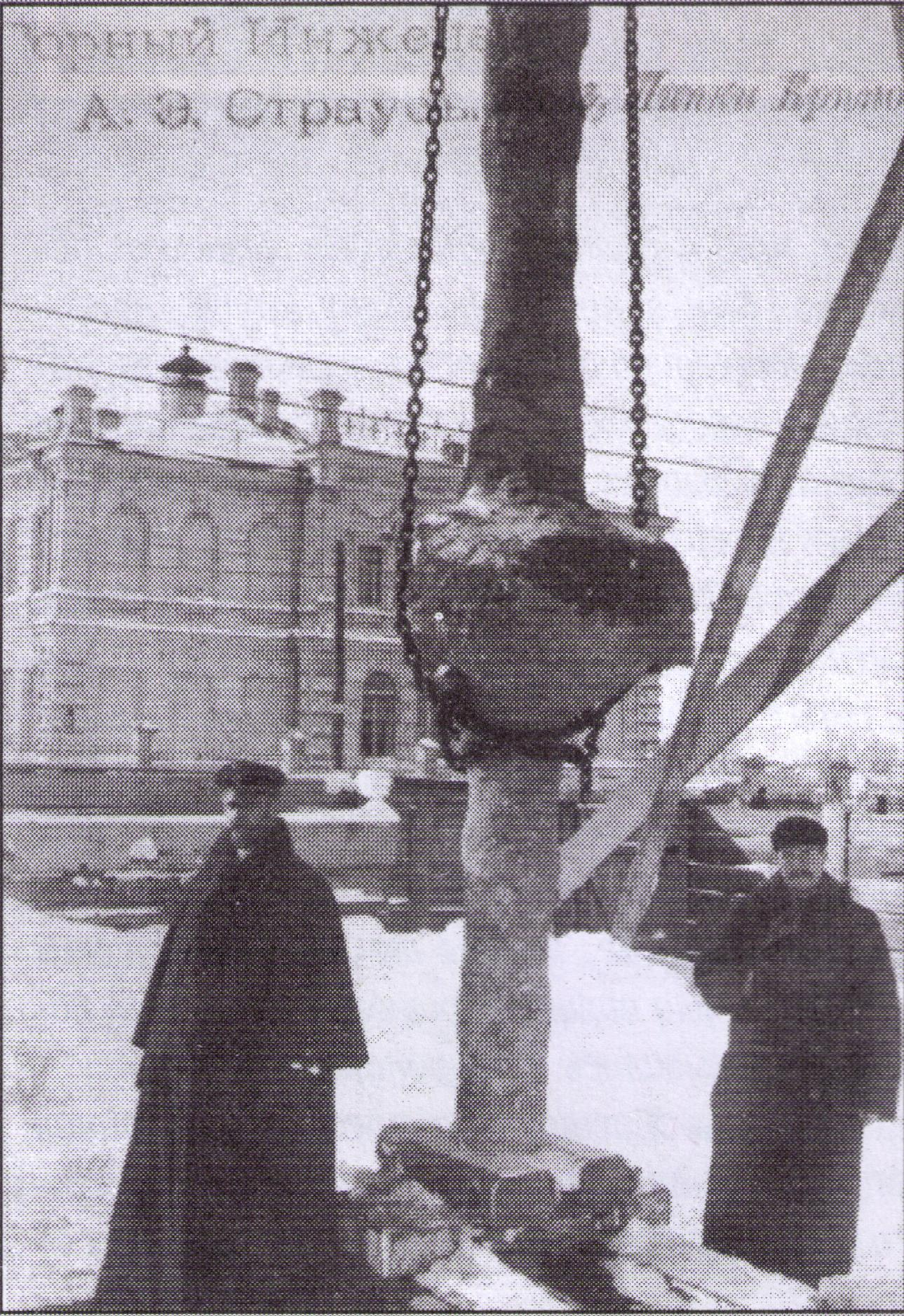
- Born: 1858; Kamianka, Russian Empire
- Died: Unknown
- Parent(s): Strauss Emil Christian Dietrich and Wiesel Fanny Elizabeth

Anton Strauss (1858, Kamianka - ?) was a mining engineer, inventor, partner of the famous architect Vladislav Gorodetsky, an entrepreneur, Kiev Yacht Club commodore, actual state councilor.

== Family ==
Anton Strauss descended from a noble family of German descent.

Father – Emil Christian Dietrich Strauss was born in Witzenhausen (Hessen, Germany) in 1829 to the parents of Herman Karl Strauss and Sofie Badenhausen. Emil Strauss graduated as a doctor of medicine and a surgeon from the University of Göttingen. As a medical doctor he participated in the Crimean and in the Caucasian Wars on the side of Russian Empire and was awarded with the Order of St. Anna (3rd Class).

Mother – Fanny Elizabeth Wiesel was a daughter of a medical doctor Bernhard Lorenz Wiesel (Poltava Governorate) and Rosalie Caroline Maier.

Brother – Oscar Strauss was born in 1858. Oscar Strauss was a physicist, mathematician, electrical engineer and an entrepreneur. He was a co-founder of the company “Savitsky and Strauss” which launched the first power plant in Kiev in 1890. He was also a shareholder of cable and gunpowder factories, a tobacco factory in Kiev and a lumber mill in Chernigov. Oscar published memoirs about Russian physicist Alexander Popov, who was the first person to demonstrate the practical application of electromagnetic radio waves.

Cousin – Oscar Wiesel was born in Russia in 1864. He graduated as a lawyer and worked in Germany, Spitsbergen, and Switzerland as a Russian consul. Wiesel later served as a general consul in Italy (Napoli) in rank of actual state councilor.

Cousin – Emil Anton Joseph Wiesel (1 March 1866, Saint Petersburg – 2 May 1943, Leningrad) – a painter, museum curator and a board member of the Imperial Academy of Arts (Russia), organizer of international art exhibitions, councilor of Hermitage and Russian museum and Legion of Honor holder. During Soviet times he was an expert in Russian and Western fine arts and sculpture in the Glavnauka museum department (central administrative board of science, science-artistic and museum institutions).

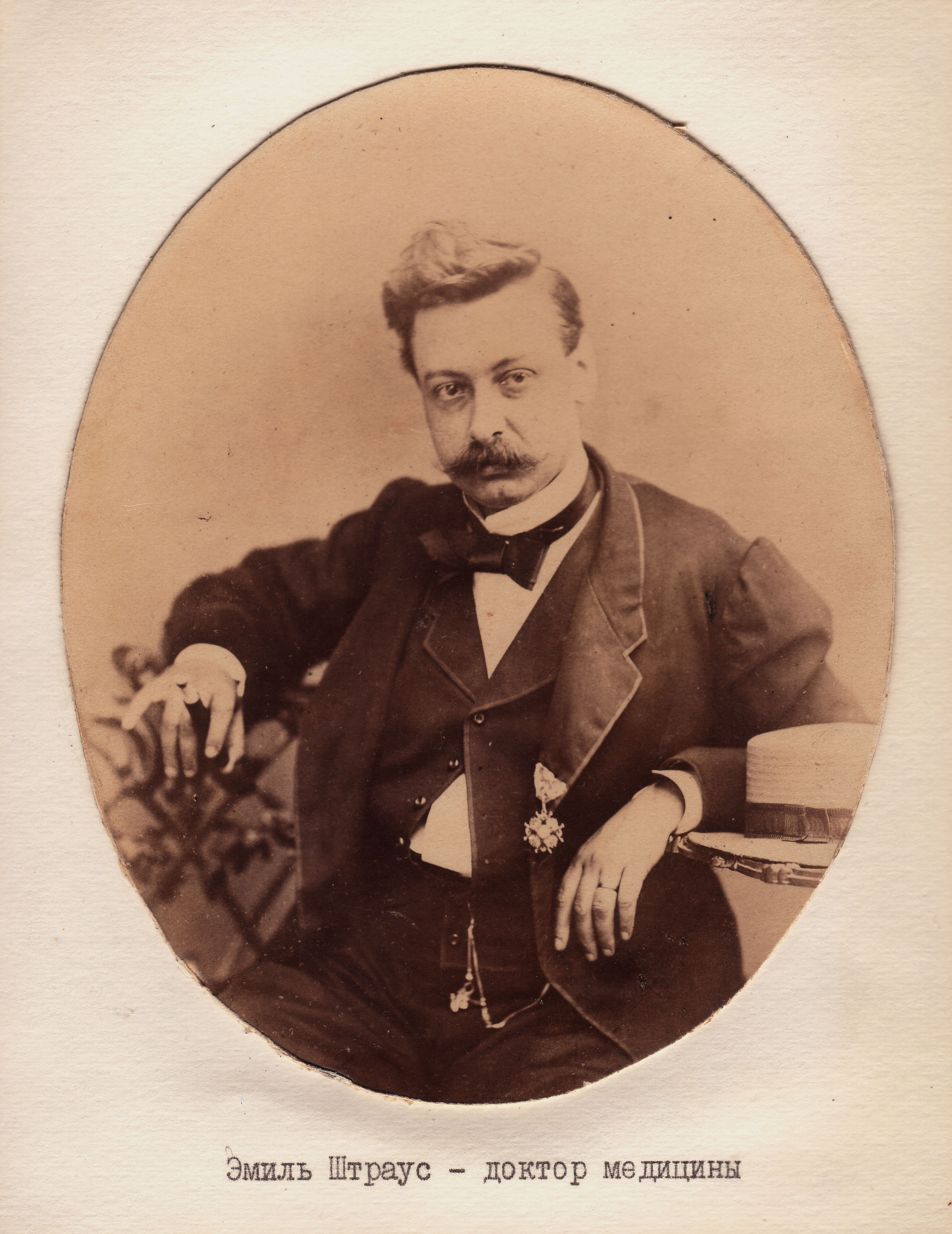
Emil Strauss

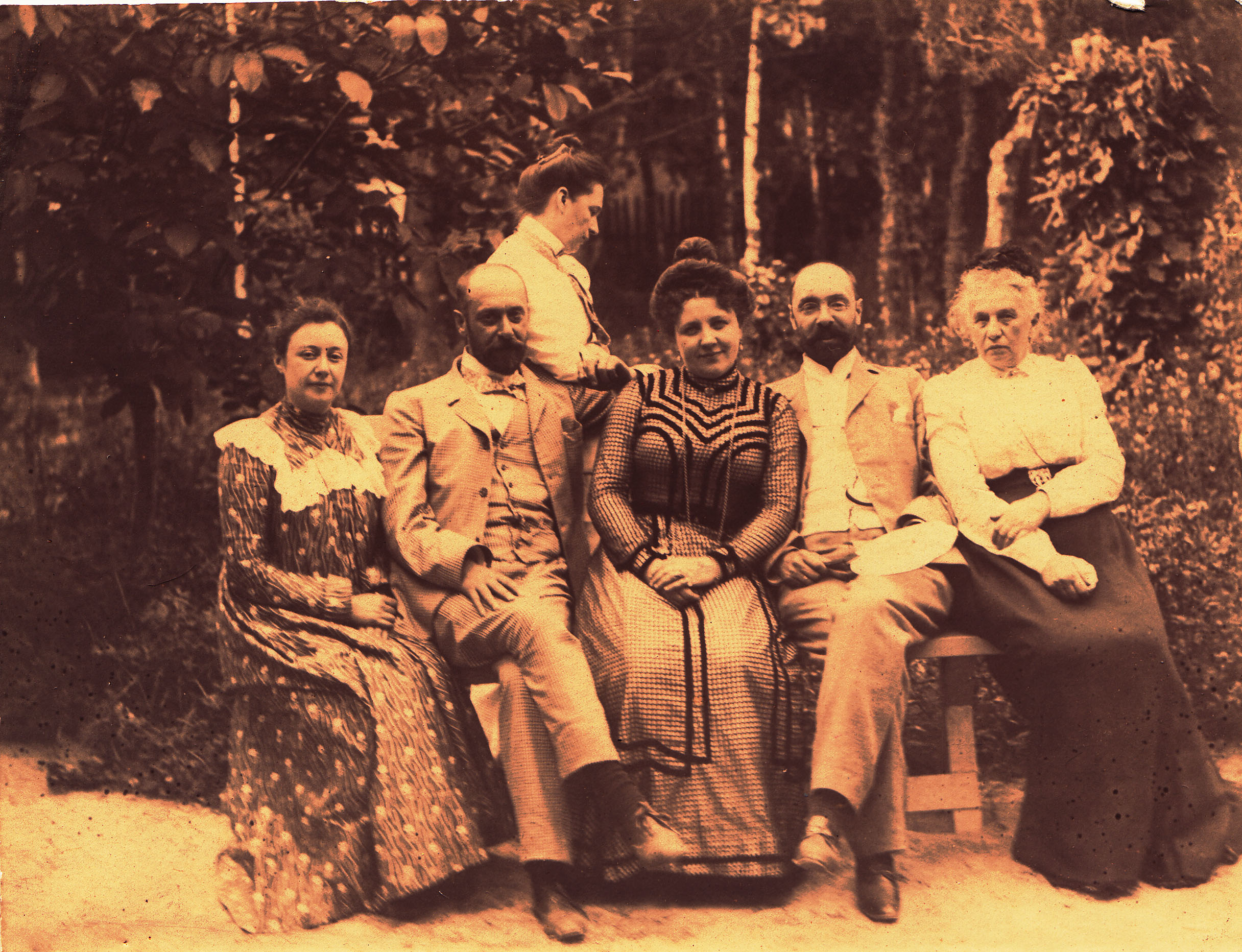
Strauss Family

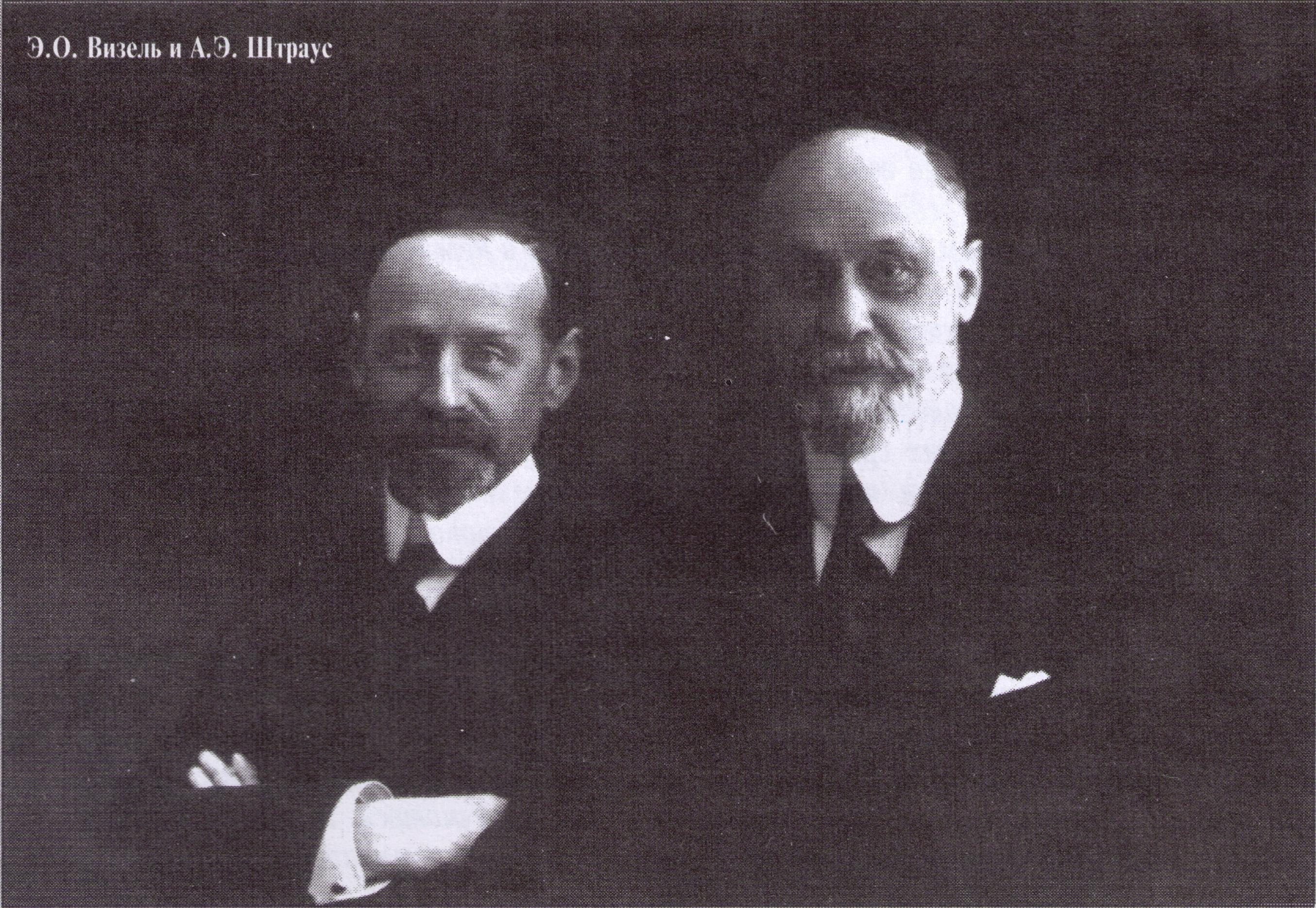
Emil Wiesel and Anton Strauss

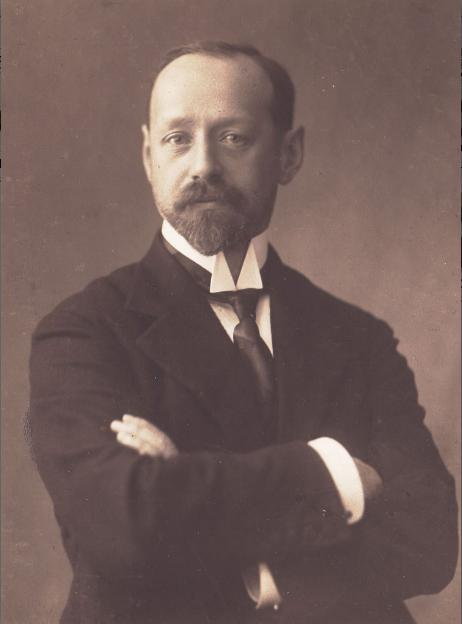
Emil Wiesel

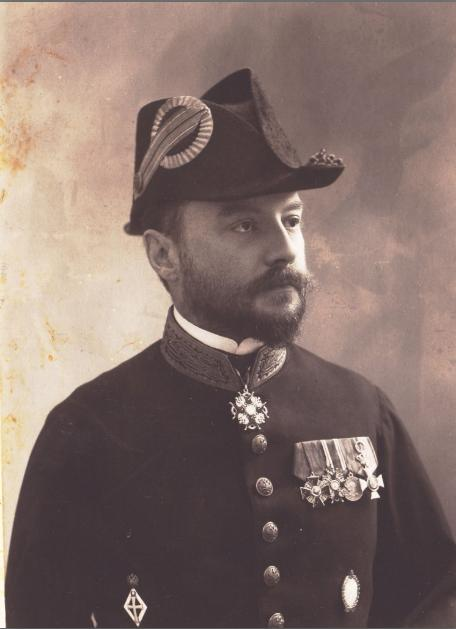
Oscar Wiesel

== Education ==
Anton Strauss studied in the Kiev Realschule. He graduated from the Saint Petersburg Mining Institute in 1892.

== Activity ==
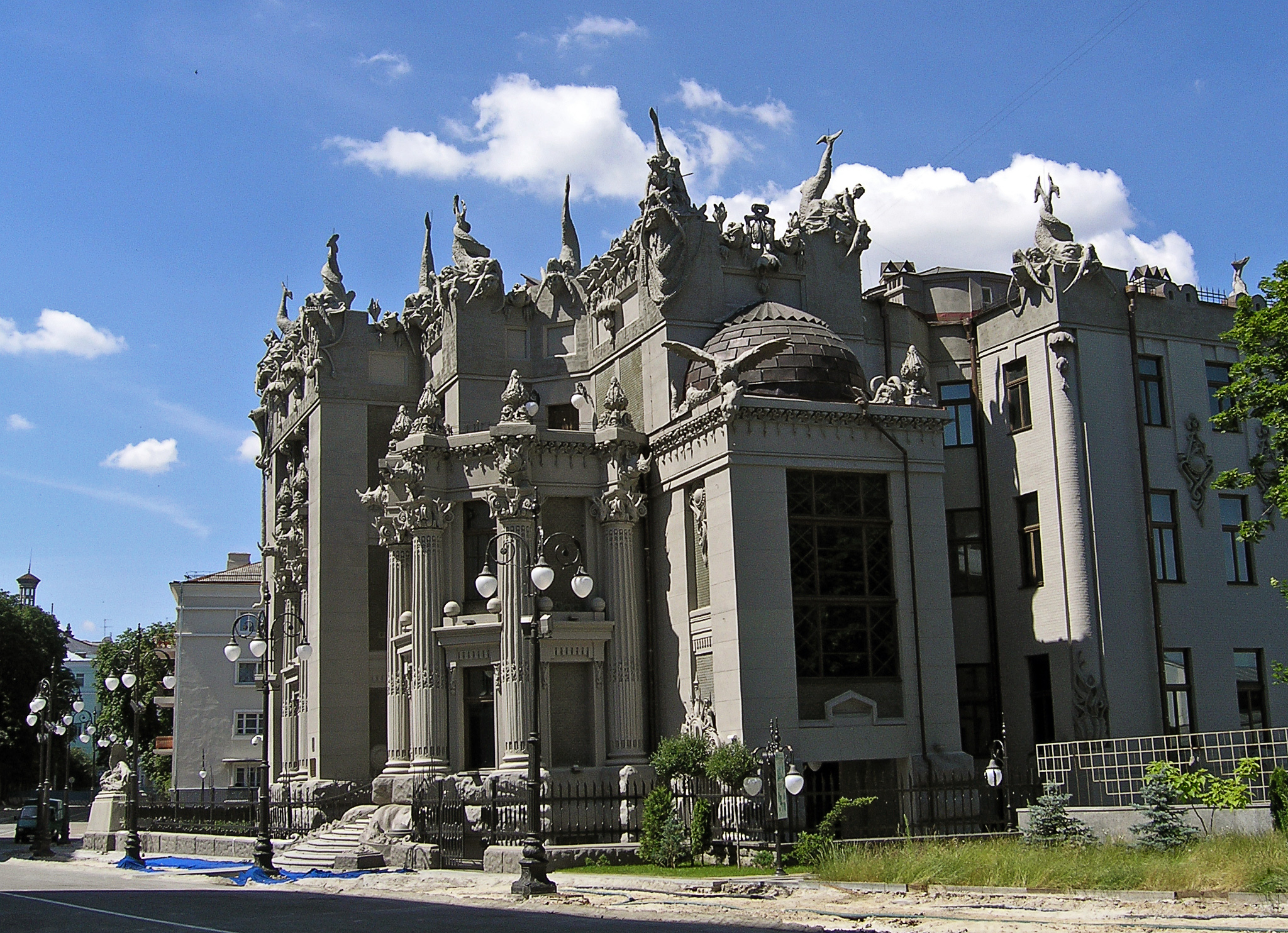
House with Chimaeras

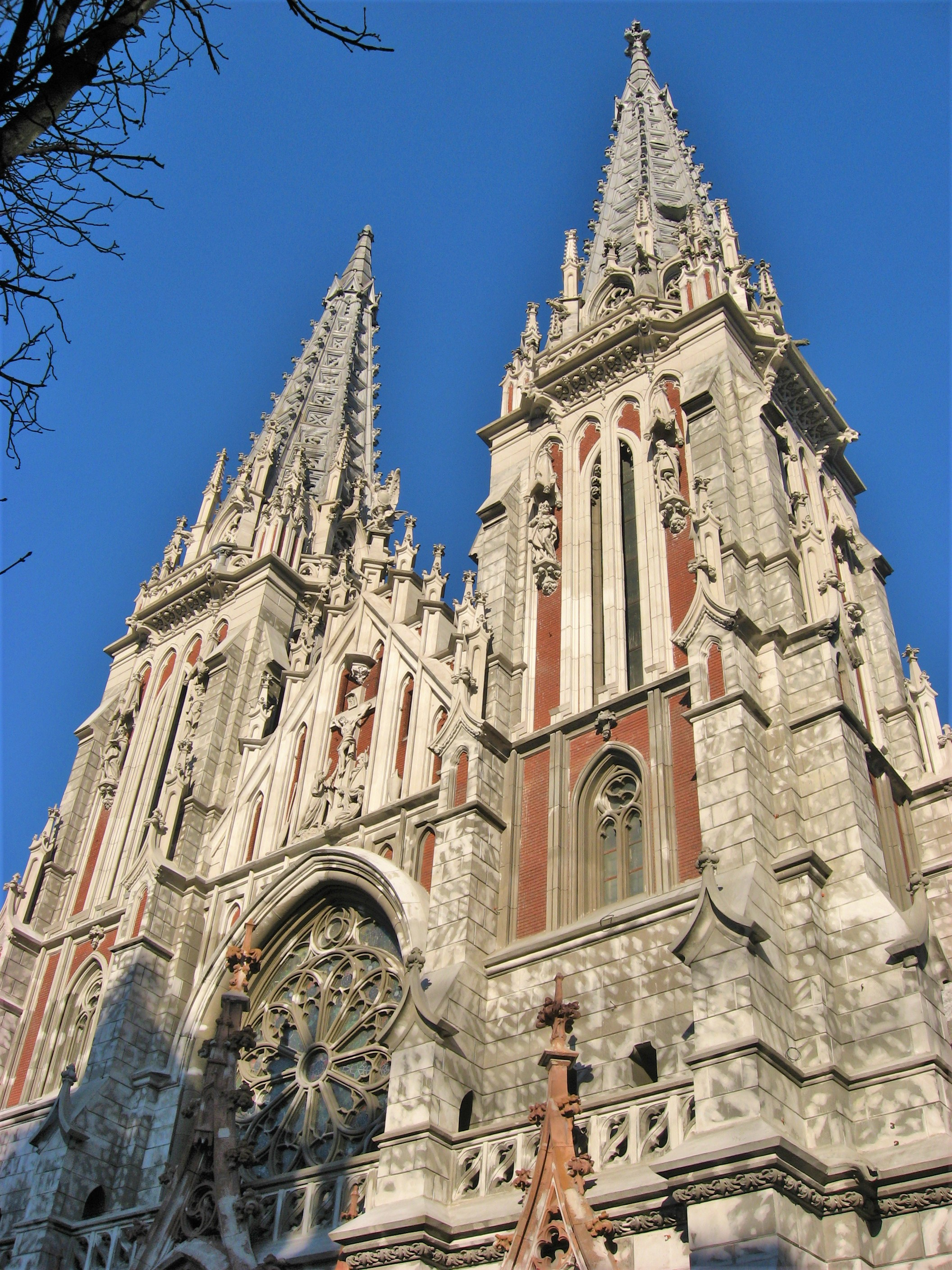
St. Nicholas Roman Catholic Cathedral

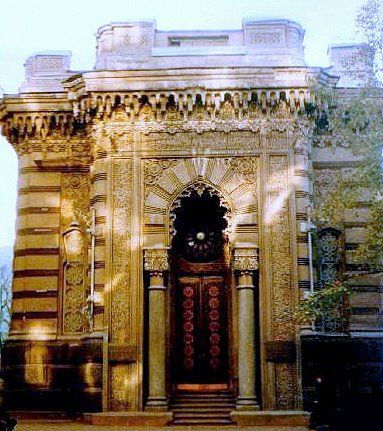
Karaite Kenesa

Anton Strauss is famous for inventing an improved method of providing a water-tight vertical layer and simultaneously compressing portions of ground adjacent to the layer for use in dams, dikes and like structures or in the ground. The technology was used for the first time during construction of buildings of Russian South-West Railways in Kiev. Later the technology was applied to construct bridges, tunnels, ports and houses in Russia and abroad. Anton Strauss patented the technology on 18 May 1909 in the US, patent # 922,207.

Anton Strauss supported various projects of his partner and close friend architect Vladislav Gorodetsky. Aton Strauss’s innovative solutions technically implemented the ideas of his famous colleague. For instance, because of a height difference, to construct the legendary House with Chimaeras in Kiev the engineer had to build special stepped foundation, pile on one side and tape on the other. As an engineer Anton Strauss participated in construction of the Museum of ancient history and arts (Grushevskogo str, 6), the Karaite Kenesa (Bolshaya Podvalnya str.7), the St. Nicholas Roman Catholic Cathedral (Bolshaya Vasilkovskaya str. 75).

Anton Strauss also owned a company (Kiev, B. Vladimirskaya str.26, 1897) that specialized in constructing boreholes, pumps, pipes, filters; and mining minerals and fossils.

Like his brother Oscar, Anton Strauss was a board member of “South-Russian gunpowder plant ” (Kiev, Bolshaya Podvalnaya str.8, 1911).

== Yacht club ==
Yachting was among Anton Strauss’ hobbies. Anton Strauss was a member of the Kiev Yacht club and it’s commodore from 1911 till 1917 (?). The club was located on Trukhanov Island with winter residence in the Fundukleevskaya str, 10 (nowadays the Khmelnitskogo str.). Grand Duke Alexander Mikhailovich of Russia patronized the Club. The annual fee was equal 25 rubles. Each member was required to own a yacht.

== Address in Kiev ==
Kreposti str, 4.

No information about Anton Strauss is available after 1917.
