= Wiesel =

Wiesel may refer to:

== People ==
- Elie Wiesel (1928–2016), Romanian-born American novelist, Nobel Peace Prize laureate, philosopher, humanitarian, and Holocaust survivor
- Elisha Wiesel (born 1972), American chief information officer of Goldman Sachs; hedge fund manager of the Niche Plus; son of Elie Wiesel
- Emíl Wíesel (1866–1943), Russian-German painter and arts curator
- Marion Wiesel (1931–2025), Austrian-American Holocaust survivor, humanitarian, and translator
- Oscar Wiesel (1864–1918), Russian-German diplomat, Norway researcher, founder of Saami collection of Russian Museum of Ethnography (Saint-Petersburg)
- Torsten Wiesel (born 1924), Swedish medical researcher, Nobel Prize in Medicine co-laureate, campaigner for human rights

== Transportation ==
- IWL SR 56 Wiesel, an East German 1950s motor scooter
- Wiesel AWC, a German armored fighting vehicle

== Other uses ==
- Wiesel, Netherlands, a settlement in Gelderland province
