= Vsya Moskva =

Vsya Moskva (literally translated "All Moscow" or "The Entire Moscow") was a series of city directories of Moscow, Russia, published on a yearly basis from 1872 to 1936 by Aleksei Sergeevich Suvorin. The directories contained detailed lists of private residents, names of streets and squares across the city with the details of their occupants and owners, government offices, public services and medium and large businesses present in the city. Each volume was anywhere between 500 and 1500 pages long. They are often used by genealogists for family research in pre-revolutionary Russia and the early Soviet period when vital records are missing or prove difficult to find. Historians use them to research the social histories of the city.

== List of residents ==
Each directory was written exclusively in Russian Cyrillic only, and contains various sections among which was an alphabetical list of residents in the city. Those listed usually were the head of their respective household and so spouses and minors are not listed.

The following information can be found:

- Person's surname and first name
- Patronymic
- Street address with apartment number
- Profession
- Telephone numbers (few private residents could afford a telephone before 1918)

== List of occupants of each building on every street and square ==
A section immediately preceding or following that listing residents in alphabetical order was a directory of all streets, houses and flats with the names of their owners and occupants. In this way readers could determine all those people who lived on a particular street of in a certain apartment block.

== Other sections ==
The following information can also be found in each directory:

- Maps of the city
- Interior theater seating plan layouts
- Lists of personnel in state, public and private institutions
- Original Advertising

== Interruption in the series ==
No volumes were published in the following years:

- 1918
- 1919
- 1920
- 1921

This was due to the events of the Russian Revolution of 1917 and the subsequent Russian Civil War.

== Termination of series ==
Publication came to a halt after the edition of 1936, coinciding with the time of Joseph Stalin's great purges and Moscow Trials.

== Historical and genealogical value ==
Because numerous residents emigrated from Moscow after the Russian Revolution of 1917 and tens of thousands more were either arrested, shot, or sent to the gulag by the Cheka and the NKVD after 1918 the section detailing residents names is especially useful in determining until when a certain person was still living in the city, and under which address.

== Availability ==
Many original directories in the series (or microfiche copies thereof) can be found in libraries across the United States, Europe (including The Baltics, Finland the United Kingdom and Germany) however most only have an incomplete collection.

== Other city directories in Russia ==
Suvorin also published city directories for Saint Petersburg under the title Ves Petersburg (All Petersburg) for the years 1894 to 1940 and for the whole country under the titles Vsya Rossiya (All Russia) from 1895 to 1923 and continued under than name Ves SSSR (All USSR) from 1924 to 1931.

== See also ==
- Ves Petersburg
- Vsya Rossiya
