= All Russia =

All Russia may refer to:

- Vsya Rossiya, a series of directories of the late Russian Empire
- All Russia (movement), a 1999–2002 Russian political movement
