= Wieseltier =

Wieseltier (ויזלטיר)
- Pronunciation: Wizel-tir/Vizel-tir

Origin
- Language: German
- Origin: German, Russian, Yiddish
- Meaning: The animal Weasel
- Region of origin: Germany, Russia, Israel, U.S.

Other names
- Variant forms: Viseltear, Vizeltir, Wizeltir Wiesler, Weasel, Wiesel

Wieseltier is a Jewish surname. Notable persons with the name include:

- Meir Wieseltier, a prize-winning Israeli poet and translator
- Leon Wieseltier, a Jewish American writer, critic, and magazine editor
