= Ves Peterburg =

City directory

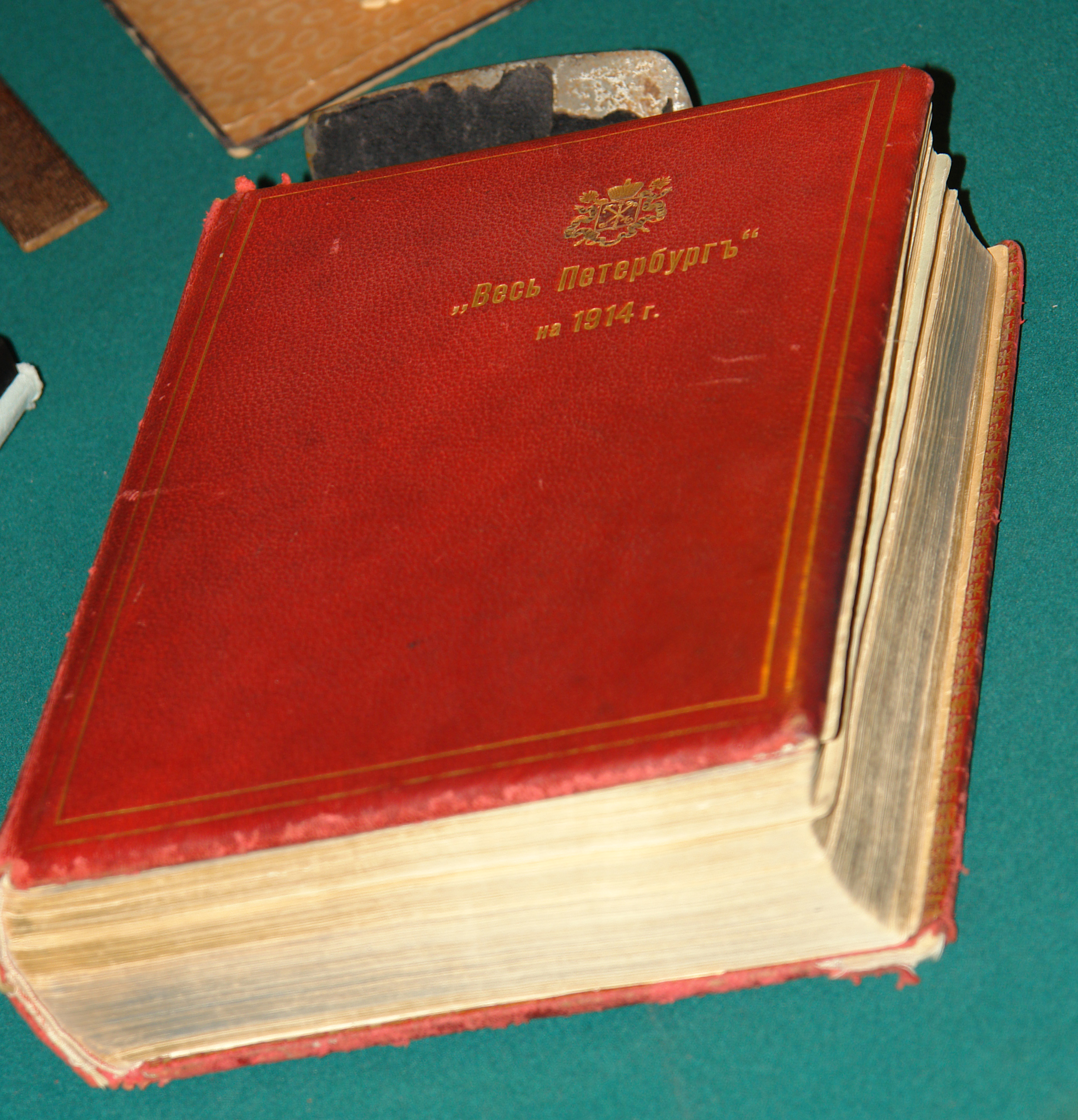
The 1914 edition of Ves Peterburg

Ves Peterburg (/vʲesʲ pʲɪtʲɪrˈburg/; in 1914–1923 Ves Petrograd; in 1924–1940 Ves Leningrad — the annual city directory of Petersburg–Petrograd–Leningrad started in 1894 by Aleksei Sergeevich Suvorin (1834–1912) in Russian Empire, continued by his descendants up to 1917 and resumed in 1922 by Lensovet, the soviet city authorities of Leningrad, up to 1935.

The full name of the edition is Russian: Весь Петербург/Петроград/Ленинград. Адресная и справочная книга г. Петербурга/Петрограда/Ленинграда. The subtitle clarifies and discloses that this directory contains addresses and the other reference information for the city. However, this huge volume, which grew up to 1900 pages, has always provided more, including surveys on the city economy, extracts from the legislative acts, lists of the post offices through the entire Russia, as well as thousands of commercial advertisings.

A point of special interest was the historic and statistical city digest in V. I. Pokrovsky's feature article, published in the Ves Peterburg in 1901 and 1903.

In the 1910s the editors of the directory gradually expanded the territorial coverage of their edition. Starting with the closest suburbs, by 1917 they included the information and maps related to the largest cities of the Petrograd gubernia. After the soviets resumed the publication of the city directory, they continued this expansion, covering more and more cities of the Leningrad oblast, up to Luga and Gdov.

== Structure ==
=== Governmental institutions ===
Until 1917, while the city was the capital of the Russian empire, 'Ves Petrograd' provided its readers with the comprehensive information upon the ministries and the councils, the royal establishments and the State Duma. The movement of the capital of the Soviet Russia from Petrograd to Moscow in 1918 coincided with the 4-year suspension of the directory (1918-1921).

In 1922, when the city authorities of Petrograd resumed the publication of the directory, the institutional section of the directory, now covered the new structure of the municipal (soviets), party committees, professional unions and other social organizations.

=== Cultural, educational, religious and other non-commercial institutions ===
In different periods the relevant information was either included in the first, 'governmental' section, or was concentrated in the separate section of the directory. Since the very first editions of the Soviet period, 'Ves Leningrad' published a list of the cathedrals and churches which were taken under state protection as cultural monuments. From the 1920s the directories contained information on education, which helps historians to trace its development from the likbez schools for illiterate to many hundreds of schools and tens of universities opened by the end of the First Five-year plan (1927-1932) and later.

=== Commercial institutions, industry and finance ===
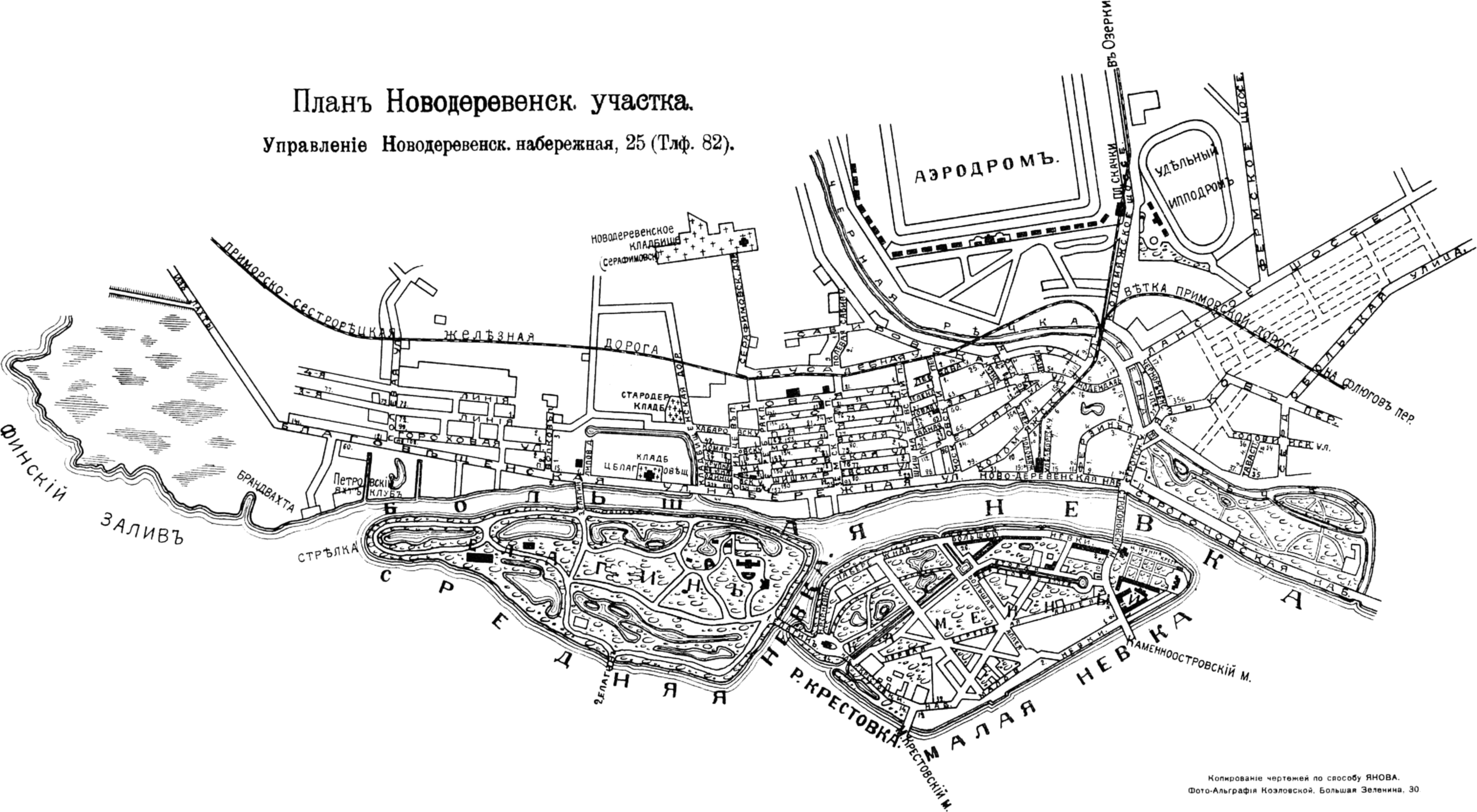
Plan of the Novaya Derevnya district of St Petersburg from the 1913 edition

The entries of this section are usually repeated in two subsections, alphabetic by name and by the branch of industry. Alongside thousands of separate commercial advertisings, it provides economic historians with a valuable source of raw data. Beyond that, the directory published special surveys on the city economy, including international trade, where Leningrad played a main role as the largest port in the USSR.

Those who imagine the Leningrad as the core of the strict government-run economy will be surprised to see tens, if not hundreds of small collectively owned guilds (artel Russian: артели) and cooperatives which continued to function in Leningrad many years after the NEP (the 'new economic policy') was suspended in favour of 5-year planning.

=== Doctors, lawyers, etc. ===
The personal lists of practitioners in medicine and advocacy are the characteristic feature of the epoch before second world war. There were hundreds of private lawyers, dentists and even obstetricians in Petrograd and Leningrad.

=== Streets and lists of residents ===
This is a very important section for the directory of the city like Leningrad, counting 2-3 million residents. The special section of the directory not only lists all the streets in alphabetic order, but also informs, what house numbers are on the odd and even sides between the crossing streets. If necessary, special maps are provided for the longest streets and prospects. Alongside with the house numbers the directory informs about the jurisdiction of the relevant city blocks, the closest post offices etc.

70% and more of the pre-revolutionary residents of Petrograd, mainly industrial workers, remained outside the directory, since they were economically forced to hire separate rooms, and even the corners of rooms, offered to them by the wholesale profiteers in hiring dwellings. Also, even in the middle-class families only the heads of households were listed in the directory, while their spouses and minors were omitted.

Nor only the addresses, but also the home telephone numbers of Matilda Kshesinskaya (#414), Aleksandr Kerensky (#11-960) were available on the pages of 'Ves Peterburg', as well as of Grigory Zinoviev (#127-61) on the pages of 'Ves Leningrad'.

=== Public transport ===
In 1970s Leningrad became the top-ranking city of the world by the length of city tram lines and the total number of tram routes. Starting with the 1908 directory, after the first lines of tram were opened in September 1907, the directory provided the detailed information on each of these routes, including the streets, the tram stops, the fares, and what is not less important, the specific combination of colored identification lights which were set for each tram route.

== Termination of series ==
The last directory of 'Ves Leningrad' was published in 1935. In the subsequent years the edition was replaced with abridged version (1939 and 1940) where all personal data (residency / domicile, phone numbers) was excluded.

== Other city directories ==
Suvorin also published city directories for Moscow under the title Vsia Moskva (All Moscow) for the years 1875 to 1936 and for the whole country under the titles Vsia Rossiia (All Russia) continued under than name Ves SSSR (All USSR) from 1924 to 1931.

Since 1993 the private publishing House Presskom launched the annual telephone directory project under the title 'Ves Petersburg', however it is radically and conceptually different from its historical predecessor, and does not list residents at all.

== Sources ==
- Veksler A. F. Ves Peterburg (Entire St. Petersburg)

== See also ==
- Vsia Moskva
- Vsia Rossiia
