= Oscar Wiesel =

Russian diplomat (1864–1918)

Osсar Bernhard Franz Wiesel
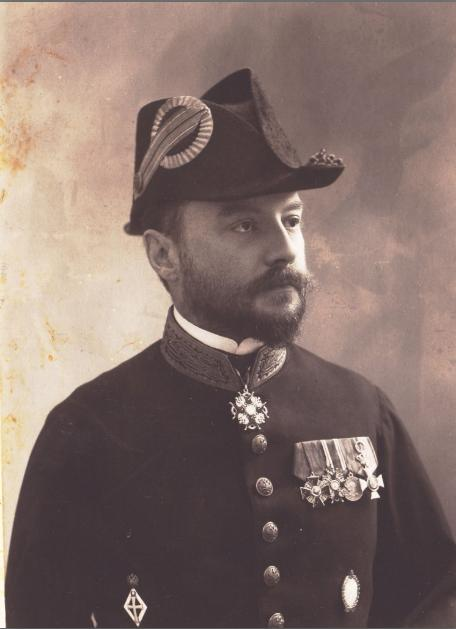
- Born: August 20, 1864; Saint Petersburg, Russia
- Died: September 27, 1918 (aged 54)
- Spouse: Marianna Pavlovna Kosagovskaya
- Parents: Oscar Sigismund Wiesel (father); Marie Christine Pointin (mother)
- Awards: Order of Saint Stanislaus; Order of St. Anna; Order of Peter Frederick Louis

Oscar Wiesel (Russian: Оскар Оскарович Визель, romanized: Oskar Oskarovich Vizel; August 20, 1864 – September 27, 1918) was a Russian diplomat. He was also a researcher of Norway, the founder of the Saami collection of the Russian Museum of Ethnography, and acting state councillor.

== Family ==
Wiesel descended from the German-Austrian Wiesel family.

His father, Oskar Borisovich Wiesel (Wiesel Oscar Sigismund), was born in Russia in 1826. He graduated from Prince Bezborodko's Gymnasium of Higher Learning in Nezhin. He worked in the Ministry of Finance and visited Berlin, Amsterdam, and Paris many times on behalf of the Emperors Alexander II and Alexander III. He also served as acting state councillor.

Wiesel's mother, Marie Christine de Pointin, was born in 1835. Her father, Fransois de Pointin, had family roots in the French province of Picardy. Pointin was born at Louis XVIII's court while in exile in Warsaw. He was known for building the silver iconostasis of the Kazan Cathedral (St. Petersburg) and was awarded the Order of St. Anna by graf Yuliy Pompeevich Litte (ital., Giulio Renato de Litta Visconti Arese).

Wiesel's wife, Marianna Pavlovna Kosagovskaya, was the daughter of Pavel Pavlovich Kosogovski, who was the governor of Vitebsk, Odessa, Kursk and Poltava.

Wiesel's brother, Emil Anton Joseph Wiesel (March 1, 1866 in Saint Petersburg – May 2, 1943 in Leningrad), was a painter, museum curator and a board member of the Imperial Academy of Arts, Russia (since 1914), organizer of international art exhibitions, a councillor of the Hermitage and the Russian Museum, and a Legion of Honour holder. During soviet times, he was an expert in Russian and Western fine arts and sculpture in the Glavnauka (central administrative board of science, science-artistic and museum institutions) museum department.

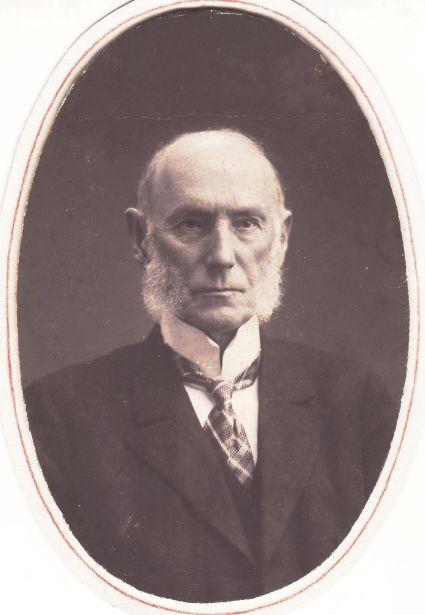
Oscar Sigismund Wiesel

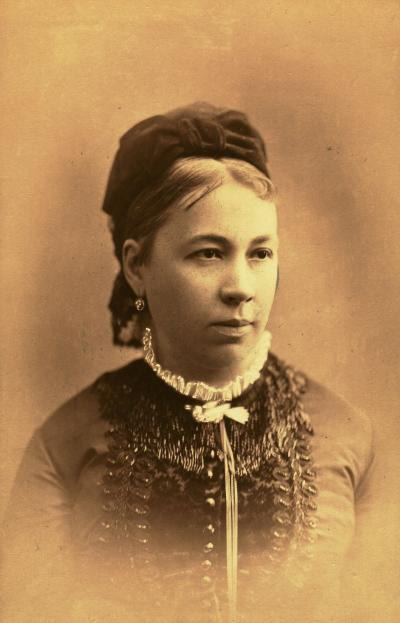
Marie Christine Pointin

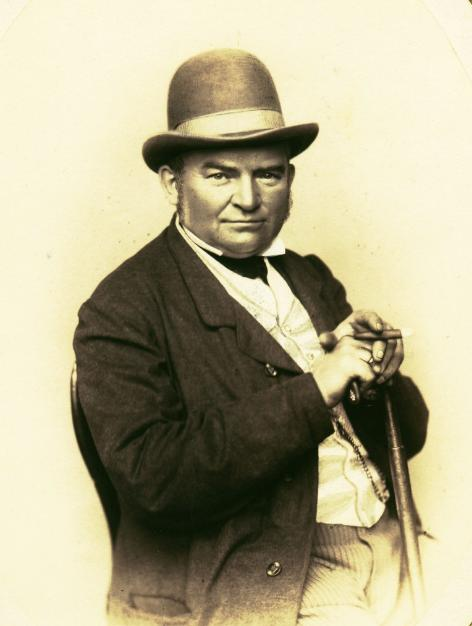
Francois Pointin

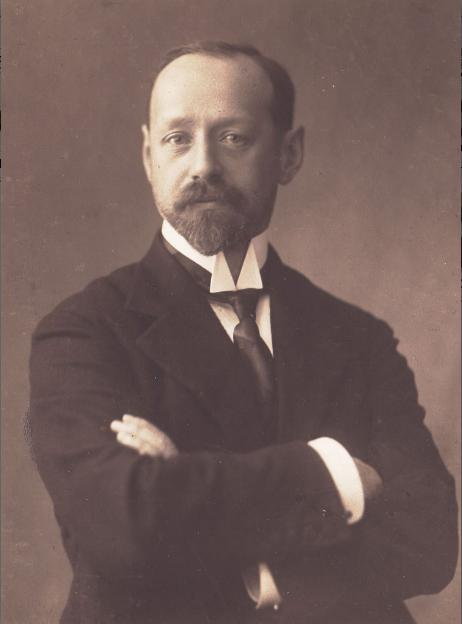
Emil Wiesel

== Diplomatic career ==
Oscar Wiesel graduated from the Second Saint Petersburg Gymnasium in 1883 with an honours degree (the silver medal). He represented Russia in European countries as an official of the Ministry of Foreign Affairs.

From 1896 to 1901, he worked in Hamburg (Germany) as a vice-consul with ranks from titular councillor to collegiate assessor.

From 1901 to 1913, he worked in Hammerfest (Norway) as a consul with ranks from court councillor to state councillor.

From 1913 to 1916, he worked in Vevey and Geneva (Switzerland) as a general consul, with the rank of state councillor.

In 1917, he was the general consul, actual state councillor, in Naples, Italy.

Oscar Wiesel's articles were published in official consulate reports at the beginning of the 20th century. These articles included information about Germany's non-European investments and colonial German policy (1900), reports on demonstrations in Northern Norway, rumours about the "Russian threat", and large cases of Norwegian treason to the benefit of Russia.

In 1909, the Second Department of the Ministry of Foreign Affairs published Wiesel's "The Compilation of Norwegian Laws, Concerning Trade and Handicraft of Russian Citizens in Northern Norway". The compilation was built on 25 years of old documents by A. Teterman. Wiesel reformed the law part, added information about local taxes in Tromsø, Hammerfest and Vardø, included information about thenNorwegian metric system, and summarized the most important Norwegian laws, which could influence Russian citizens.

=== Norwegian Sami ===
During Wiesel's diplomatic years in Norway, he was interested in researching the Sami people, a local ethnic group. In 1904 and 1914, he presented two collections to the Russian Museum of Ethnography in Saint Petersburg, consisting of more than 100 pieces, which would become the core part of the Saami collection of the museum. It included items such as clothing, shoes, jewellery, household items, harnesses, fishing tackles, and boats. Some items had earlier been presented to Wiesel by the well-known Saami researcher Konstantin Shekoldin, the Archpriest of the Saint Boris and Gleb Church.

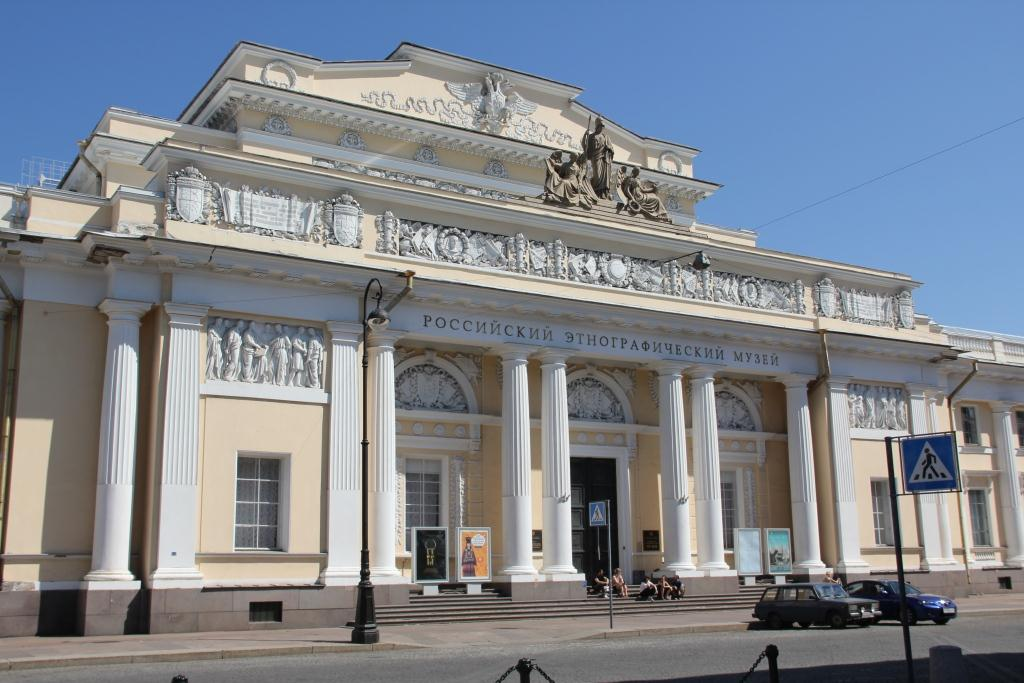
Russian Museum of Ethnography, Saint Petersburg

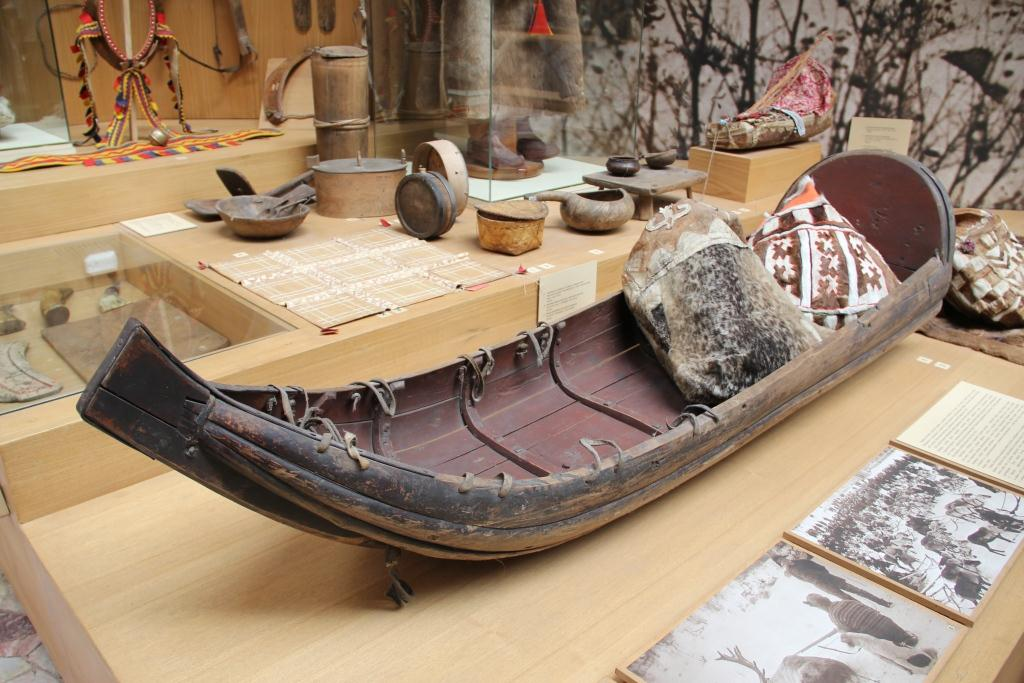
Museum exhibit (Saami)

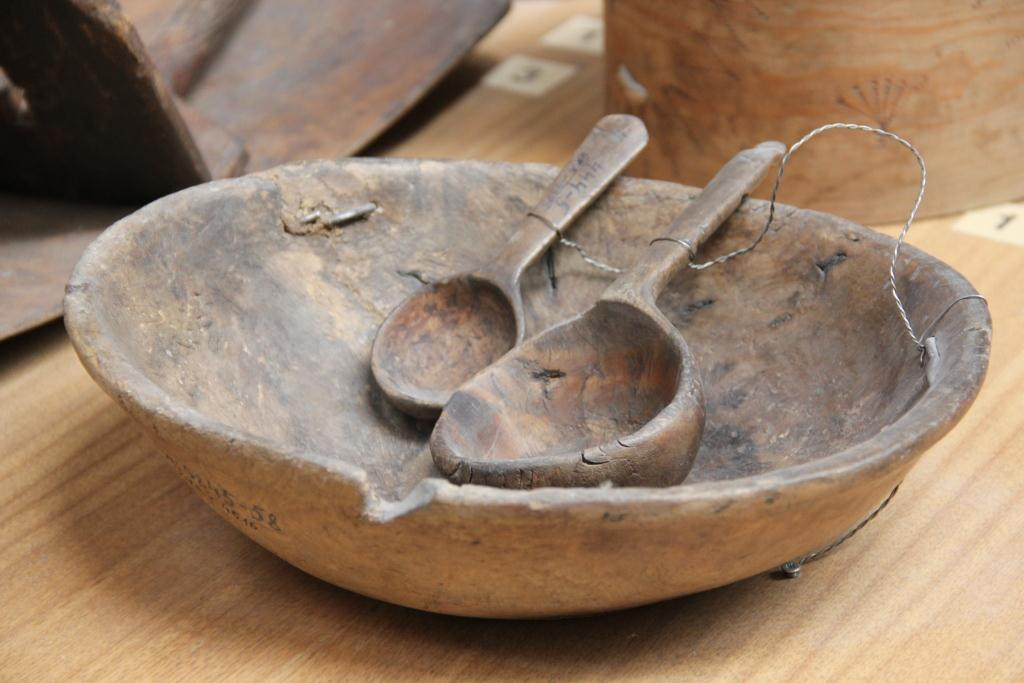
Museum exhibit (Saami)

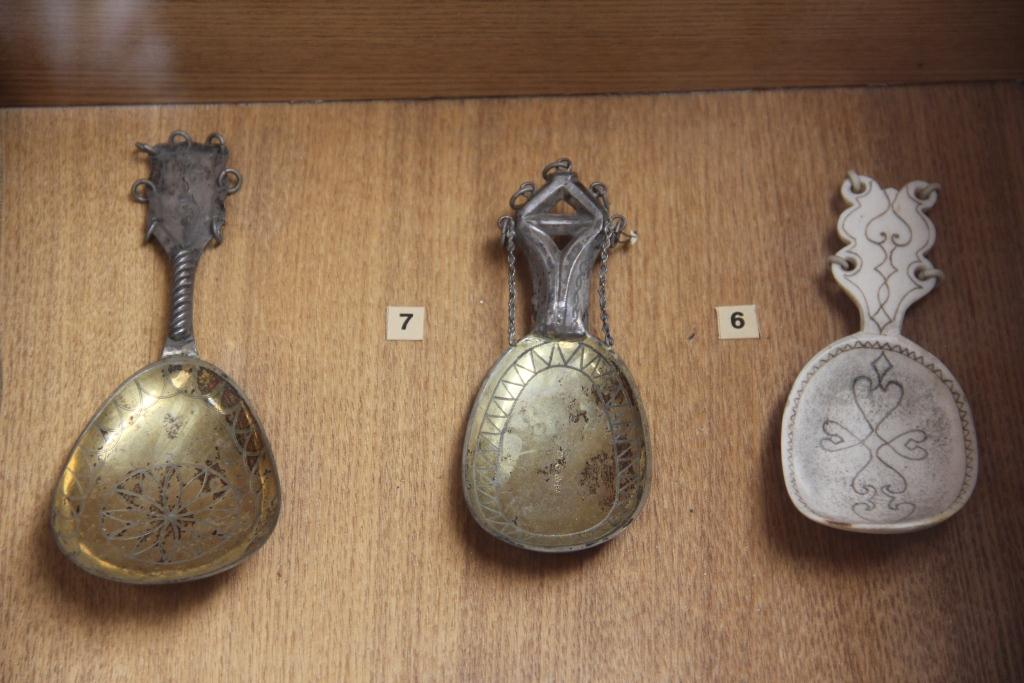
Museum exhibit (Saami)

=== Russian Revolution ===
Following the Russian Revolution, Oscar Wiesel was appointed general consul in Naples. He was a member of the Union of Renaissance of Russia in cooperation with allies in Rome.

== Literature ==
- Ves' Peterburg na 1894 god, Adresnaja i Spravochnaja Kniga [Entire St. Petersburg in 1894, Address and Reference Book]. A. S. Suvorin. 1894.
- Ves' Peterburg na 1896 god [Entire St. Petersburg in 1896]. A. S. Suvorin. 1896.
- Ves' Peterburg na 1910 god, 17-j god Izdanija [Entire St. Petersburg in 1894, 17th Year of Publication]. A. S. Suvorin. 1910.
- A. P. Shashkovskij, ed. (1913). Ves' Petrograd na 1913 god: Adresnaja i Spravochnaja Kniga g. Petrograda na... [Entire St. Petersburg in 1913: Address and Reference Book of the City of Petrograd on...].
- A. P. Shashkovskij, ed. (1914). Ves' Petrograd na 1914 god: Adresnaja i Spravochnaja Kniga g. Petrograda na... [Entire St. Petersburg in 1914: Address and Reference Book of the City of Petrograd on...].
- Kuropyatnik, M. S. (2004). "Kollekcii po etnografii saamov" [Collections on the ethnography of the Sami]. Materialy po etnografii. T. II: Narody Pribaltiki, Severo-Zapada, Srednego Povolzh'ya i Priural'ya [Materials on ethnography. Vol. II: Peoples of the Baltic, North-West, Middle Volga and Urals] (in Russian). Saint Petersburg: 136–141.
- Vizel, O. (1909). "Sbornik norvezhskih uzakonenij, kasajuwihsja torgovli i promyslov russkih poddannyh v Severnoj Norvegii" [The Compilation of Norwegian Laws, Concerning Trade and Handicraft of Russian Citizens in Northern Norway]. Tovarishzhestva Hudozhestvennoi Pechati [Artistic Printing Association]. St. Petersburg: 66.
- Sbornik Konsul'skih Donesenij [Collection of consular reports]. Vol. 4. St. Petersburg. 1900.
