= Vsya Rossiya =

Series of directories of the Russian Empire

Vsya Rossiya (literally translated "All Russia" or "The whole Russia") was the title of a series of directories of the Russian Empire published by Aleksei Sergeevich Suvorin (and his heirs; Suvorin died in 1912) on a yearly basis from 1895 to 1923 and was continued under the name Ves SSSR (Literally translated All of the USSR or The whole USSR) from 1924 to 1931. Each volume was anywhere between 500 and 1500 pages long. The directories contained detailed lists of government offices, public services and medium and large businesses present in major cities across the Russian Empire. These directories are often used by genealogists today to trace family members who were living in pre-revolutionary Russia and the early Soviet period when vital records are missing or prove difficult to find. Historians use them to research the social histories of late 19th century and early 20th century Russia.

== Contents ==
The following information can be found in most editions:

- a surname index of over 100,000 names and thousands of companies
- a directory of prominent landowners
- lists members of the Imperial House of Russia and government officials
- statistical information about the Russian Empire
- population figures
- information and guidelines about trade and industry in Russia
- lists of joint-stock companies
- sub-sections detailing a directory of each district of each province, listing administrative officials, merchants, industrial and commercial manufacturers
- original advertising

== Availability ==
Many original directories in the series (or microfiche copies thereof) can be found in libraries across the U.S., Europe (including the Baltic countries, Finland the United Kingdom and Germany) however most only have an incomplete collection.

== Other city directories in Russia ==
Suvorin also published city directories for Saint Petersburg under the title Ves Petersburg (Literally translated All Petersburg or The Whole Saint Petersburg) for the years 1894 to 1940 and for Moscow under the title Vsia Moskva (Literally translated All Moscow or The Whole Moscow) for the years 1875 to 1936.
