= Emil Wiesel =

Russian painter (1866–1943)

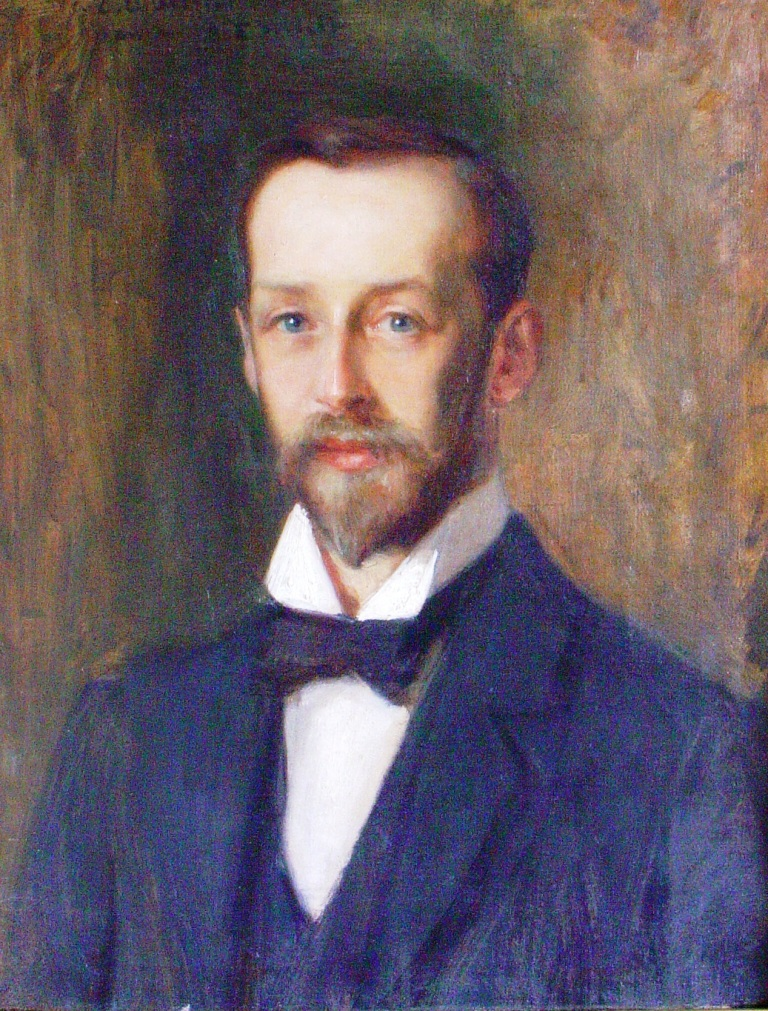
- Portrait by Albert Edelfelt, 1900s
- Born: Wiesel Emil Anton Joseph; 1 March 1866; Saint Petersburg, Russia
- Died: 2 May 1943 (aged 77); Leningrad, Russian SFSR, Soviet Union
- Known for: Painting, drawing, art expert and organisation of international art exhibitions
- Awards: Chevalier of Legion of Honour, Paris, 1900; Commander of Order of Leopold II, Brussels, 1910; Order of the Crown of Italy, Rome, 1911

Emil Wiesel (Russian: Эмиль Оскарович Визель, romanized: Emil Oskarovich Vizel; 1 March 1866 – 2 May 1943) was a Russian and Soviet painter, museum curator and a board member of the Imperial Academy of Arts (since 1914). He was an organizer of international art exhibitions, the councillor of the Hermitage and Russian Museum, and a holder of the Legion of Honor. During Soviet times, he was an expert in Russian and Western fine arts and sculpture in Glavnauka (central administrative board of science, science-artistic and museum institutions) museum department.

== Family ==
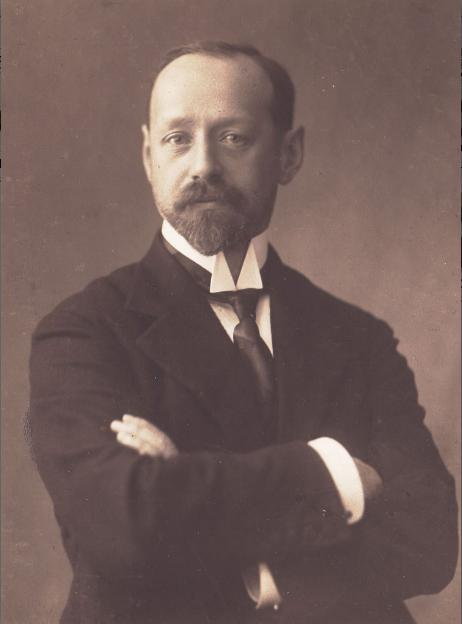
Emil von Wiesel

Emil Oskarovich Wiesel (Wiesel Emil Anton Joseph) – baron, the son of Acting State Councilor (rank in civil service in pre-1917 Russia), descended from the German-Austrian Wiesel family.

Father – Oskar Borisovich Wiesel (Wiesel Oscar Sigismund), born in Russia in 1826, graduated from Prince Bezborodko's Gymnasium of Higher Learning in Nizhyn (nowadays Nizhyn Gogol State University), worked in the Russian Ministry of Finance, repeatedly visited Berlin, Amsterdam, Paris on behalf of their Majesties tsars Alexander II and Alexander III.

Mother – Marie Christine de Pointin was born in 1835. Her father Fransois de Pointin, who had family roots from the French province of Picardy, was born at Louis XVIII's court in exile in Warsaw. He was notable for building the silver iconostasis of the Kazan Cathedral (St. Petersburg) and was awarded the Order of St. Anna by graf Yuliy Pompeevich Litte (ital., Giulio Renato de Litta Visconti Arese).

Brother – Oskar Oskarovich Wiesel (Wiesel Osсar Bernhard Franz) was born in Russia in 1864. Graduated as a lawyer, worked in Spitsbergen and in Switzerland as a Russian consul, later as a general consul in Italy (Napoli) in rank of acting state councilor.

Wife – Alexandra Emilievna Straus (Strauss Alexandra Hermina) (1866–1939) studied in Kiev gymnasium and passed a course of applied art at the Imperator's artists encouragement society in St.Petersburg in the fields of “china-ware painting” and “wood carving”.

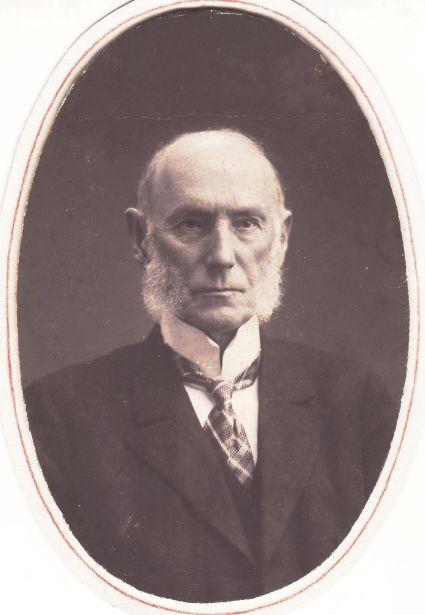
Oscar Sigismund Wiesel

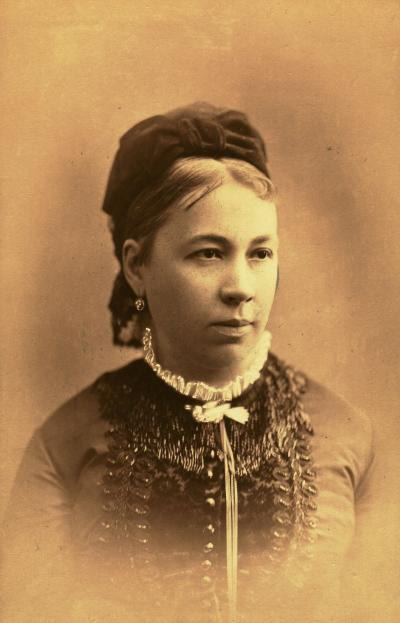
Marie Christine Pointin

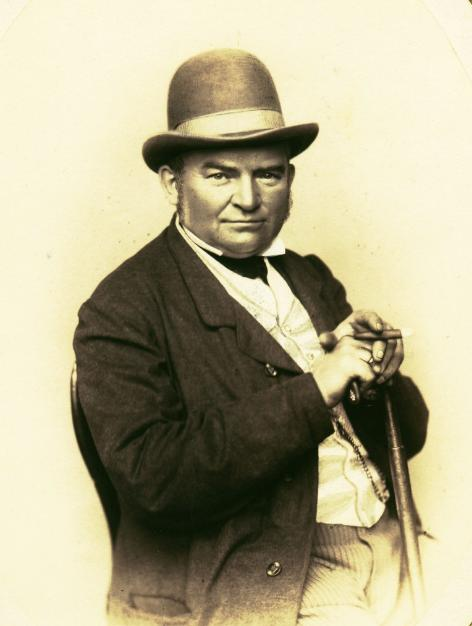
Francois Pointin

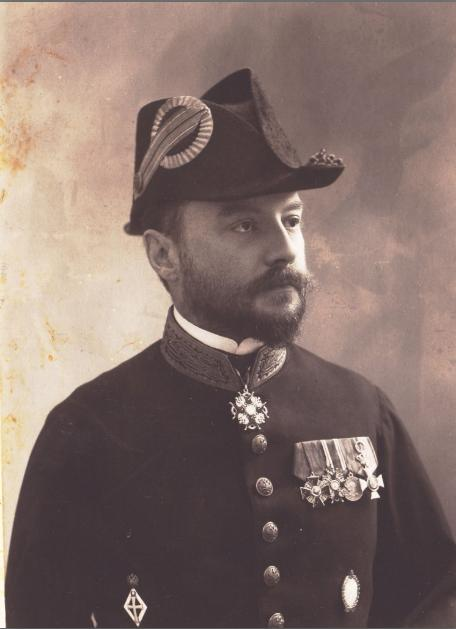
Oscar Wiesel

== Education ==
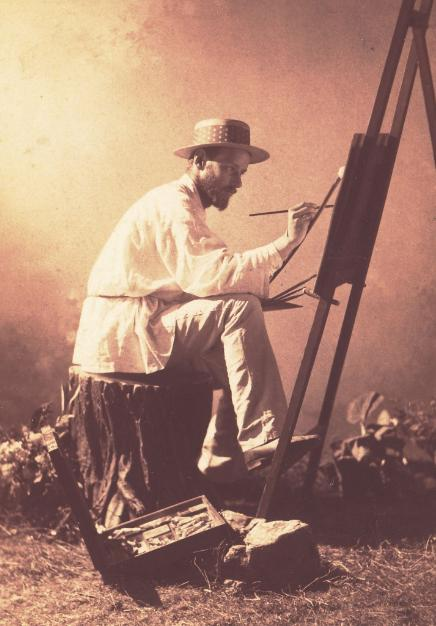
Emil Wiesel

Emil Wiesel graduated from St.Petersburg University, from physics and mathematics faculty. His interest in drawing and painting induced him at the same time to attend evening lessons at school of the Imperator's artists encouragement society, which was followed by attending the Imperial Academy of Arts. Subsequently, he proceeded his education in Munich at Alexander von Wagner's studio, there he mastered the drawing technique typical for this school, which includes the well-defined outline and highly detailed image.

Later, together with his friend, Ivan Endogurov, also an artist, he moved to Paris. There they were admitted to Fernand Cormon's studio, which was famous during that period, being a place where academism could contest with the strengthening impressionism. Cormon's classes were attended by such distinctive artists as Henri de Toulouse-Lautrec and Vincent van Gogh. It was Cormon who showed Wiesel new graphic methods that became a basis of his impressionistic picture technique that relied not on the outline but on treatment of light and shade. Wiesel has also studied in Académie Colarossi in Paris.

== Creative work ==
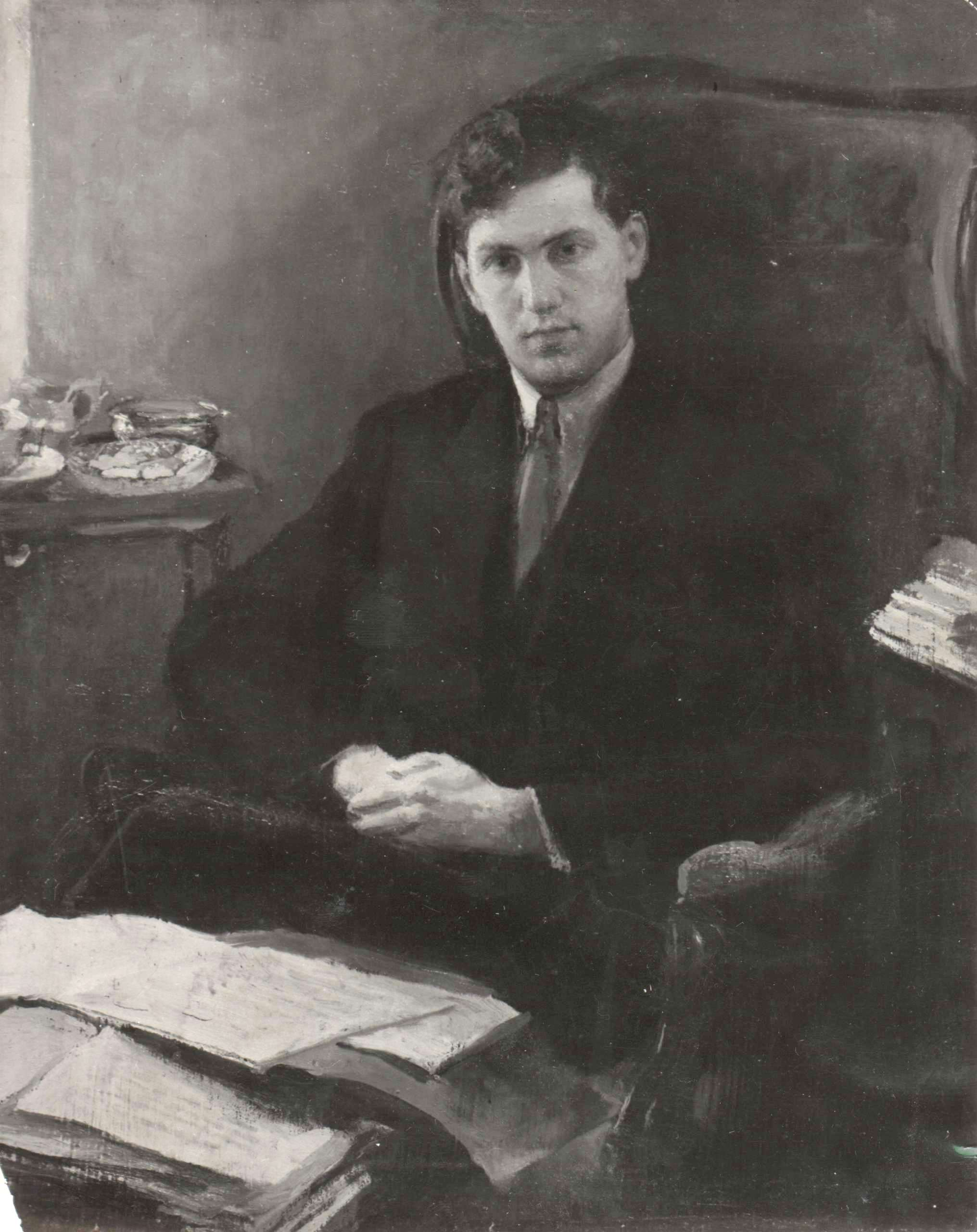
Emil Wiesel. Portreit of Vladimir Sofronitsky

Wiesel was recognized as a mature artist after his and Endogurov's paintings were started to exhibit in Paris Salons (1894 and 1901). At the beginning of the 20th century Emil Wiesel performed a portrait series of his eminent contemporaries: graf Vladimir Kokovtsev, academician Alexander Karpinsky, astronomer Sergey Glazenap, artist Ilya Repin, physician Gundobin N.P., singer Leonid Sobinov, ballet dancers Marie Petipa and Galina Ulanova, composers Pyotr Ilyich Tchaikovsky, Nikolai Rimsky-Korsakov, Ilya Glazunov and others. On demand he created portraits of the presidents of the Academy of Arts, tsar's family members, and later Vladimir Lenin. A particular place in his heritage is given to numerous pictures performed in his impressionistic manner reflecting his love for St.Petersturg and its surroundings: impressions on his events, journeys and meetings with various people.

His portraits in oil paint and a huge series of pictures of Vladimir Sofronitsky are run through with lyricism. Wiesel worked in painting and graphic arts using oil, watercolor, gouache, Indian ink, Italian and lead pencils. He proved himself as a master in the portrait, landscape, interior imaging, and scenic genre.

== Exhibitions ==
Wiesel's pictures are stored and exhibited in museums of Moscow, St. Petersburg, Saratov and Kazan. The Theatre museum in St. Petersburg keeps his watercolor and pencil scenes and actors sketches. A part of Wiesel's documents, correspondence and pictures are kept by the Academy of Arts, the Bibliotheca named after Mikhail Saltykov-Shchedrin, and the St. Petersburg History Museum. The first personal exhibition was held at the date of the 100th anniversary in 1966 in the Academy of Arts Museum. More than 160 Wiesel's canvases were exhibited in 1998 in Kazan Museum of Fine Arts together with other pictures of the members of Wiesel dynasty. The Emil Wiesel's art heritage was exhibited twice in 2012:

- "The Wiesel Dynasty", Moscow
- "Germans in Russia", Kazan State Museum

== Activities: museums, exhibitions, organizational and science work ==
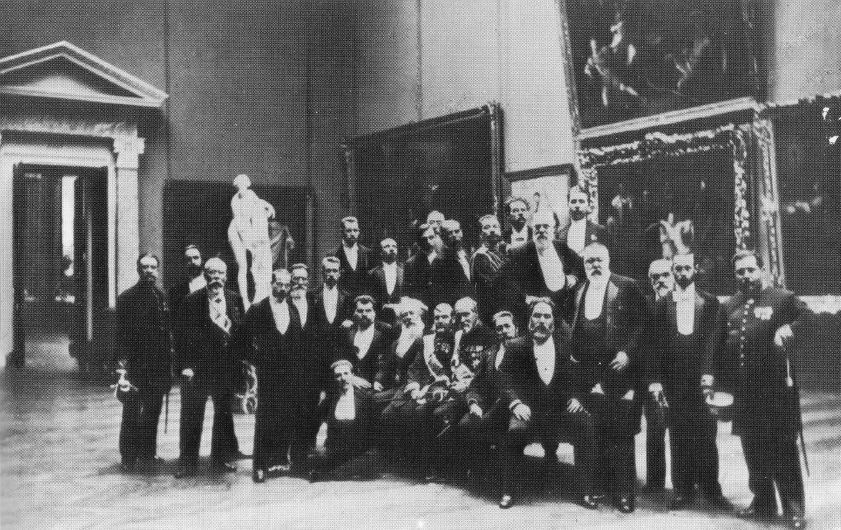
Opening of a Russian museum 7 (19) of March 1898. (Emil Wiesel is the second from the right)

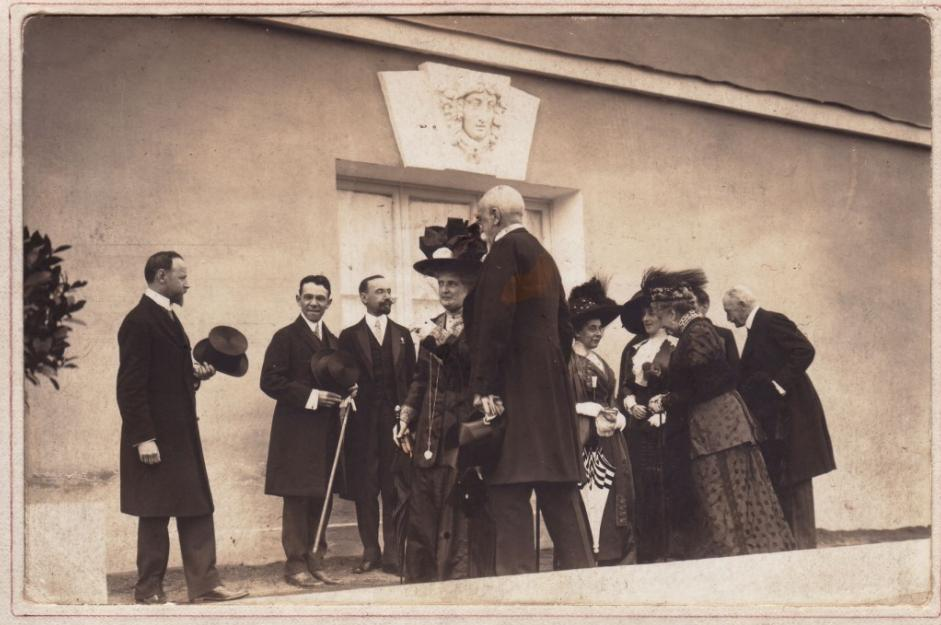
Emil Wiesel (the first from the left) is introduced to the queen of Italy

In 1894 Emil Wiesel was invited to become the assistant to the curator of the Academy of Arts Museum. It was a Wiesel's initiative to found new department in the Imperial Academy of Arts. He took part in the Russian Museum's collection development (1898). He reissued a new charter, held reorganizations, supported provincial museum launches and controlled their activities.

In 1900 Wiesel went to Paris as a representative of Russia to run the Russian department of fine arts at the international exhibition. The French government appreciated his activities and granted him with a Legion of Honor. Later he organized the Russian departments of fine arts at the international exhibitions in Munich (1901), Brussels (1910), Rome (1911), and Turin (1913). In 1914 Emil Wiesel was chosen to become a full member of the Imperial Academy of Arts. He worked as a Russian and Western fine arts and sculpture expert in the committee in Glavnauka (the central administrative board of science, the science-artistic institution and the museum institution) museum department and a councilor of the Hermitage and Russian museums. During the revolution Emil Wiesel evacuated the Academy of Arts Museum's collections to Moscow in order to save the masterpieces, and later returned them back to Pertograd (St.Petersburg).

Emil Wiesel also performed scientific work: he performed reports and wrote articles in mass media on the topic of museums activities. He participated in cataloguing the exhibits of the Academy of Arts Museum (1915). There survives his fundamental scientific work “The interrelation of visual perceptions and the expression of fine art” (1930).

== Exile to Kazakhstan and Siege of Leningrad (the Leningrad Blockade) ==
During the period of Stalin's repressions, Emil Wiesel, his wife, his son Oscar Wiesel (ethno-linguist, professor of Institute of Oriental Studies in Leningrad (St. Petersburg)) with his wife Vera Sholpo, and Emil's grandson Andrey Wiesel were sent to Kazakhstan, to the village Chelkar (1935). Despite financial and living difficulties, Emil Wiesel and Vera Sholpo, both artists, continued creating portraits and landscapes, now on the Central Asian plot. Emil Wiesel and his wife managed to return to Leningrad after two years thanks to a close family friend Vladimir Sofronitsky. One year later his son Oscar Wiesel and family also left Kazakhstan. Since they were not allowed to settle in Moscow or Leningrad, they chose Kazan as a place of living, a city with a university, rich with museums, theaters and intellectual and artistic life, where both an artist and a linguist could find a job.

The Siege of Leningrad was the last challenge to Emil Wiesel. He died at the age of 77 years in 1943.

== Addresses ==
Saint-Petersburg, 4th Line (Liniya), Vasilyevsky Island, 1.

The family Wiesel owned a house on the Medumi lake (Medumi, Latvia), and the village Grinishki (nowadays Teteri, Latvia).

== Gallery ==
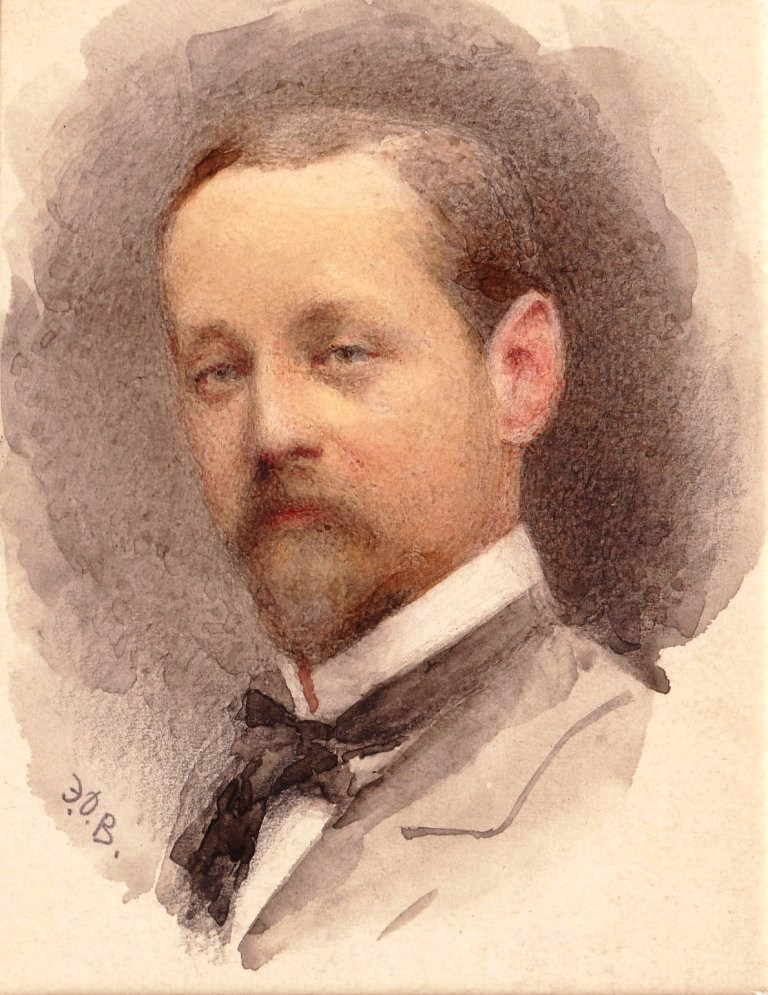
Self-portrait

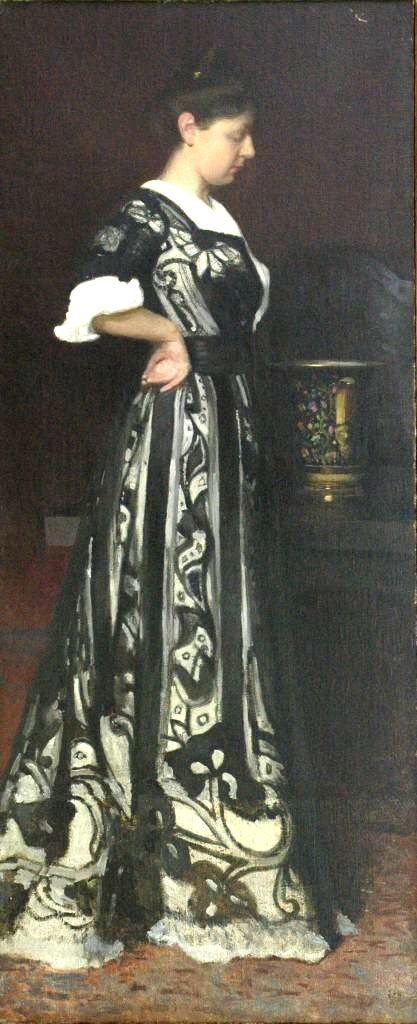
Spouse Straus Alexandra, Hermina

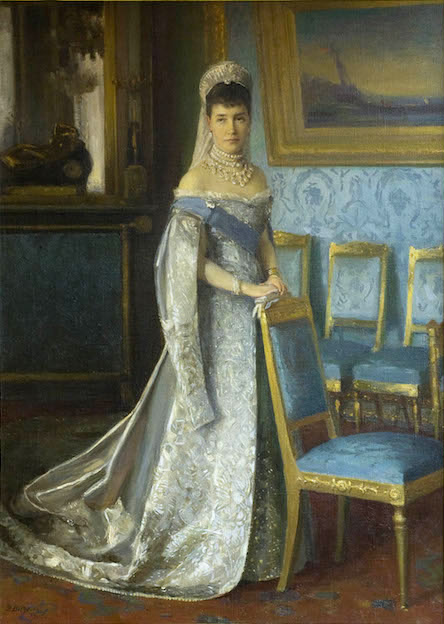
Maria Feodorovna (Dagmar of Denmark). 1905 г.

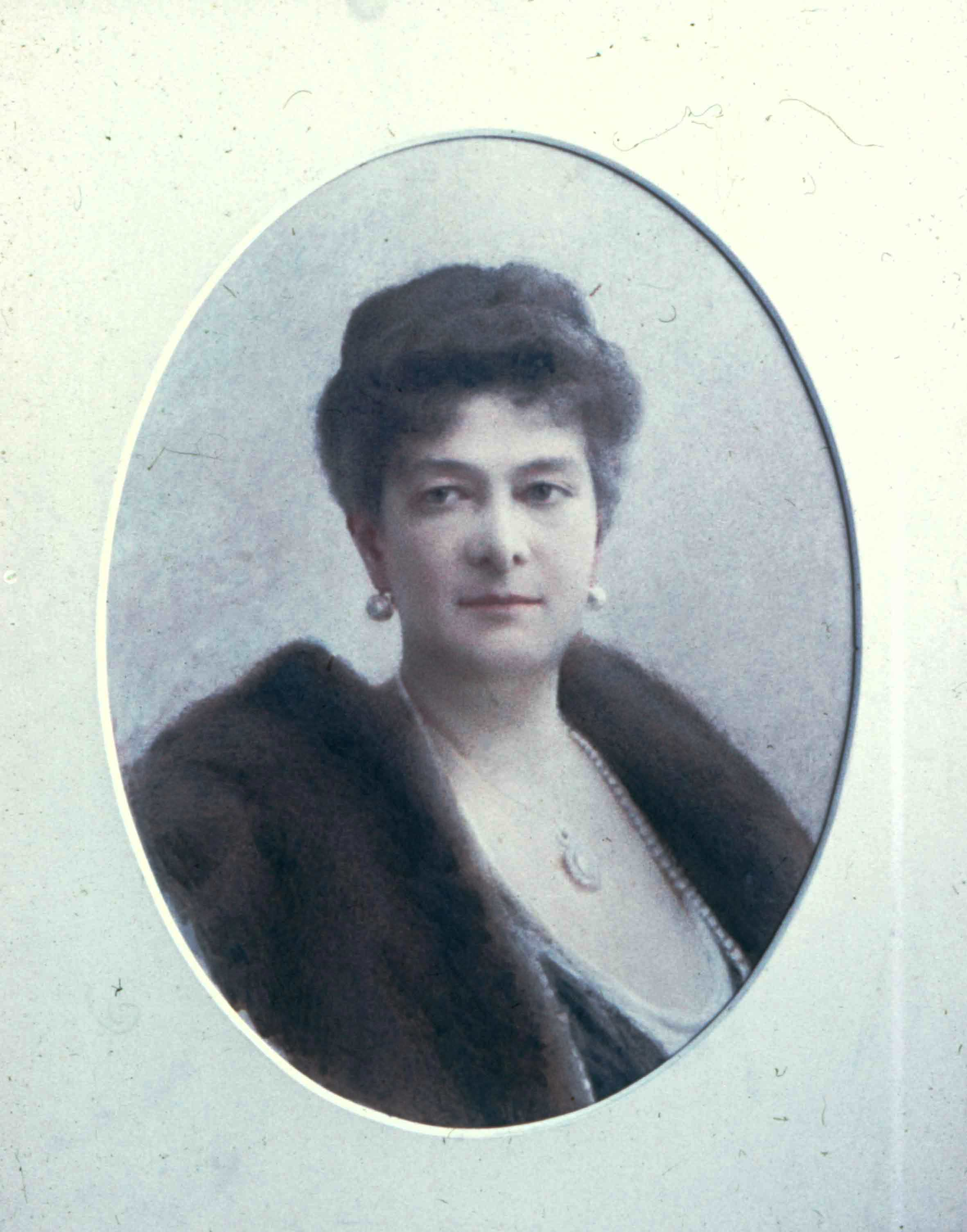
Duchess Marie of Mecklenburg-Schwerin

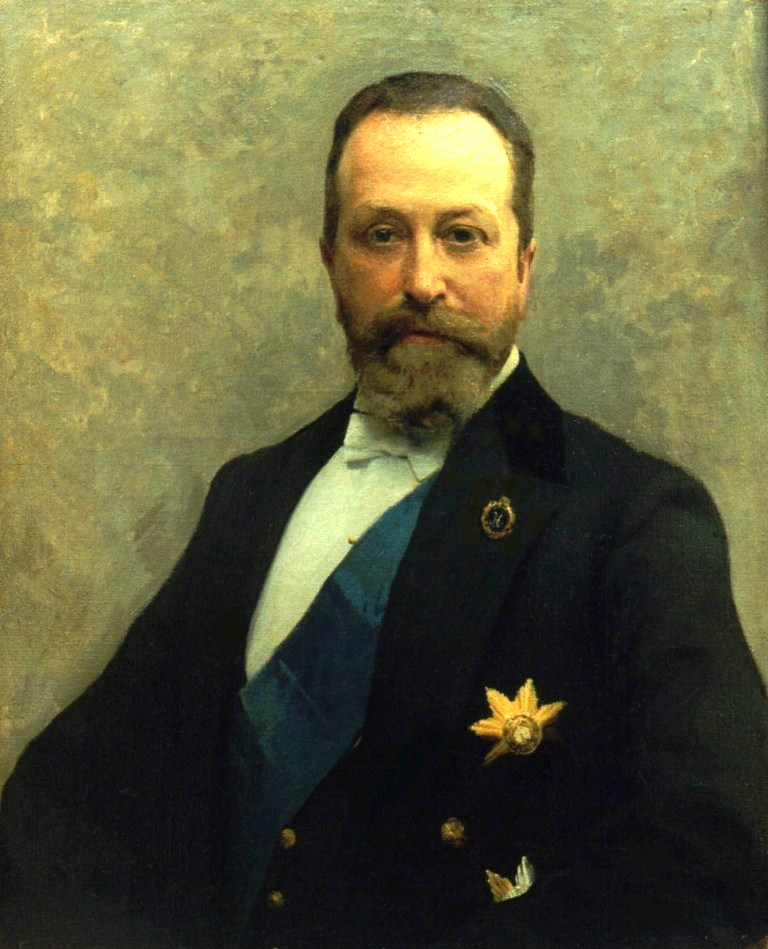
graf Vladimir Kokovtsov (Hermitage)

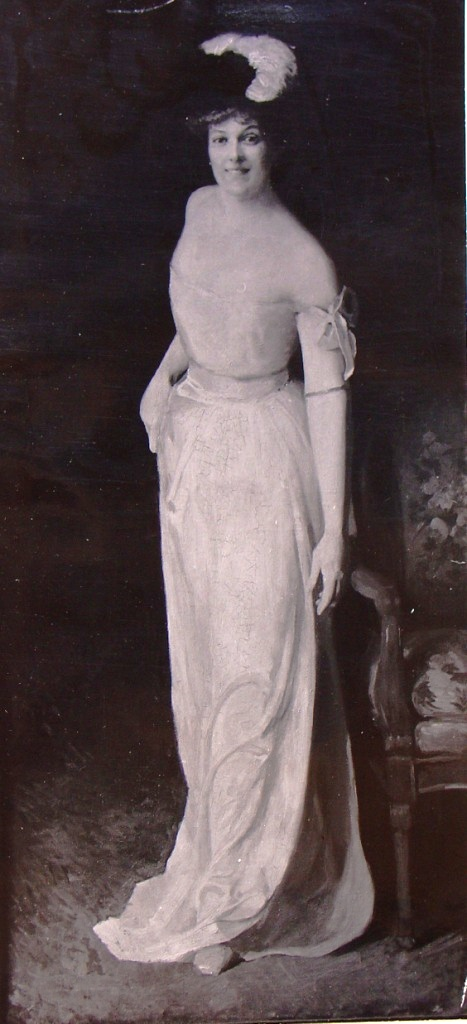
Ballet dancer Marie Petipa

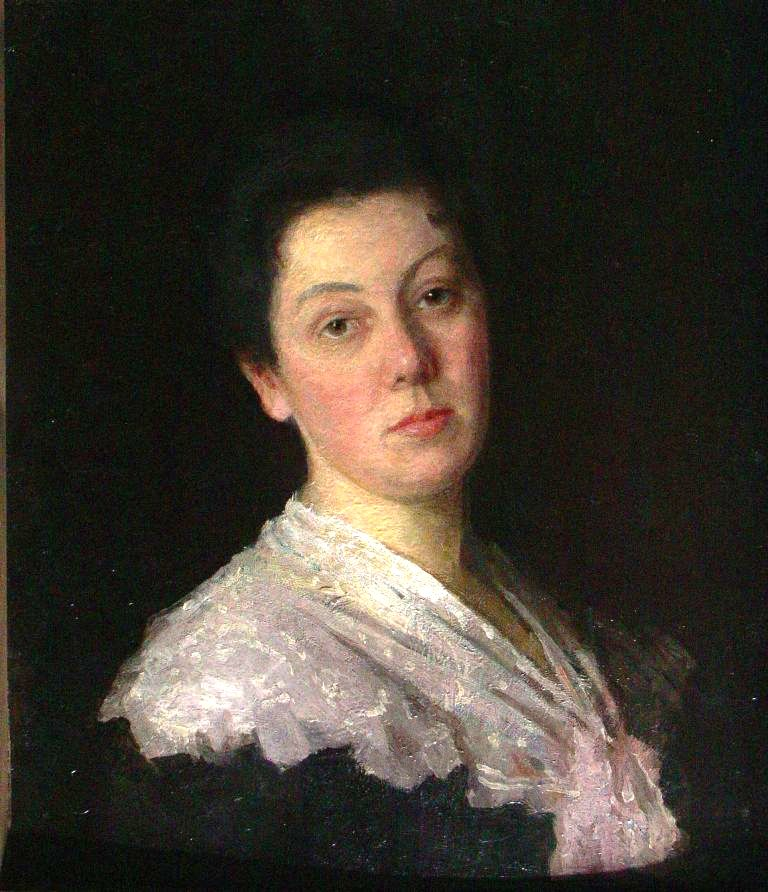
Alexandra Wiesel

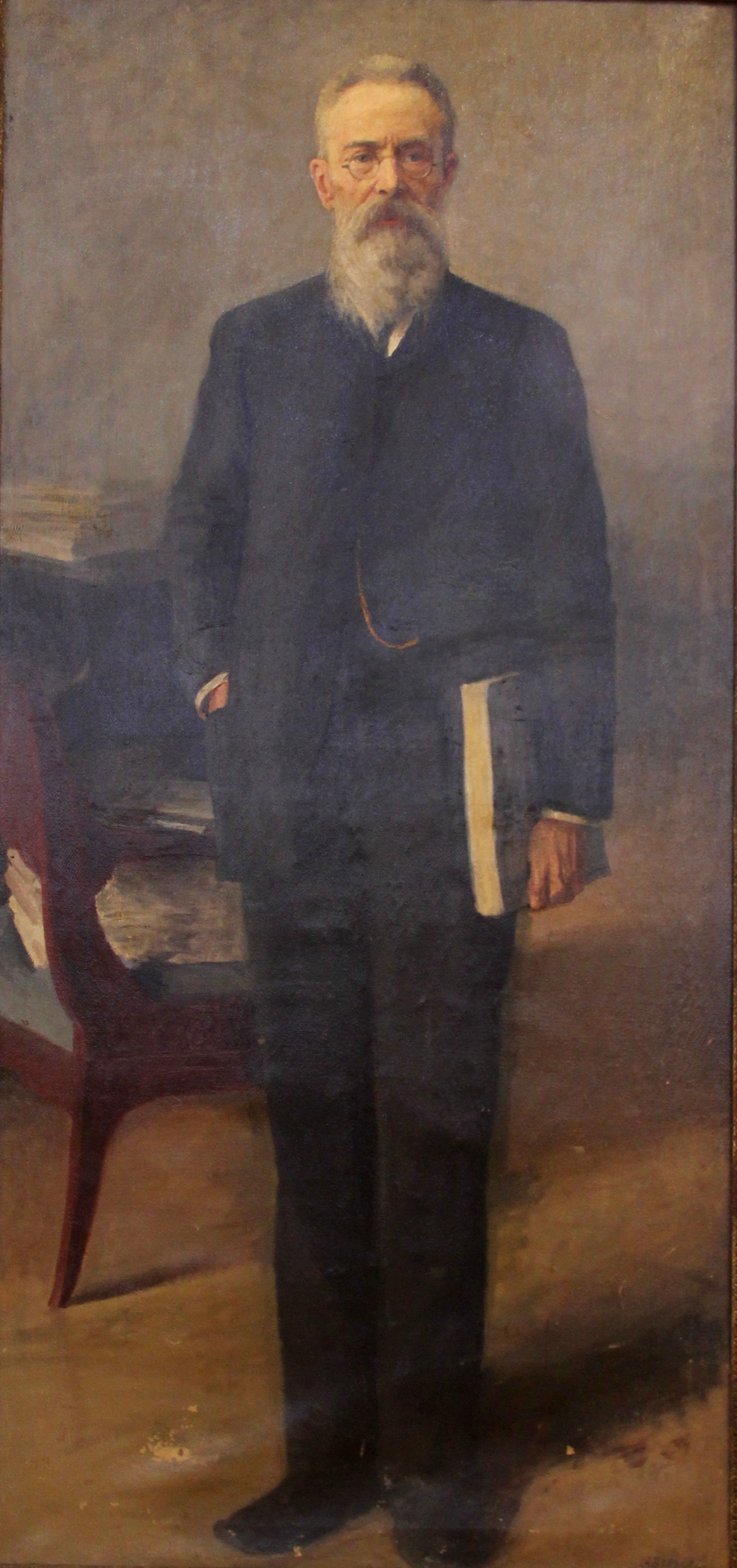
Nikolai Rimsky-Korsakov (Saint Petersburg Conservatory)

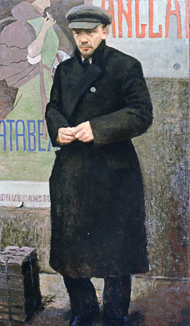
Vladimir Lenin in immigration (State Historical Museum, Moscow)

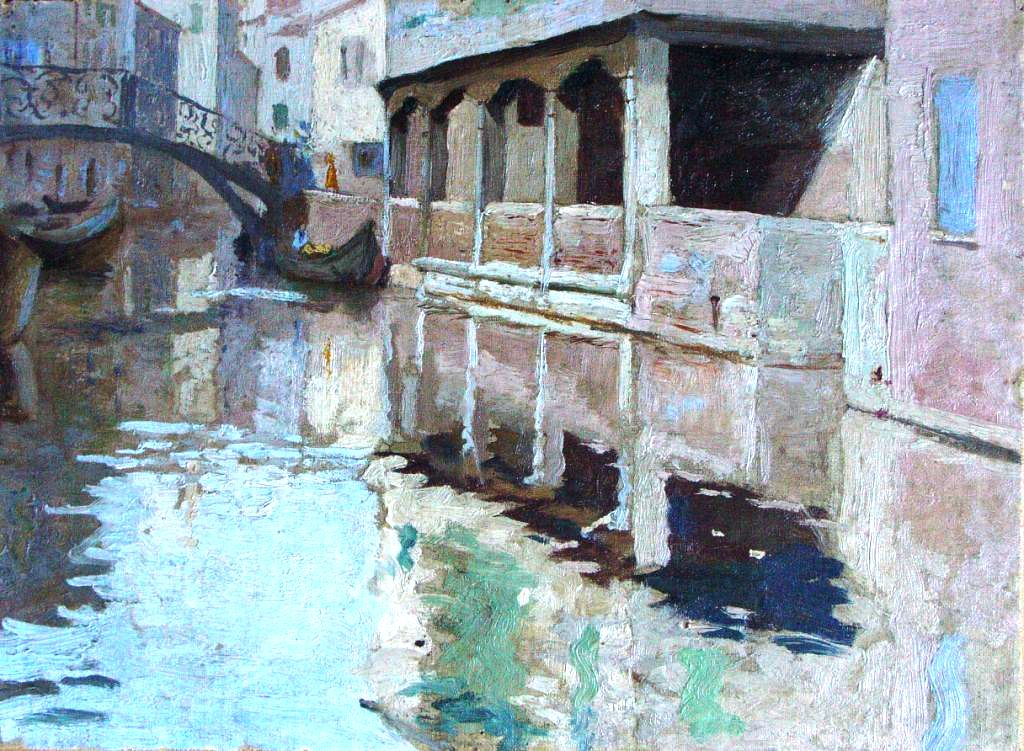
Venice

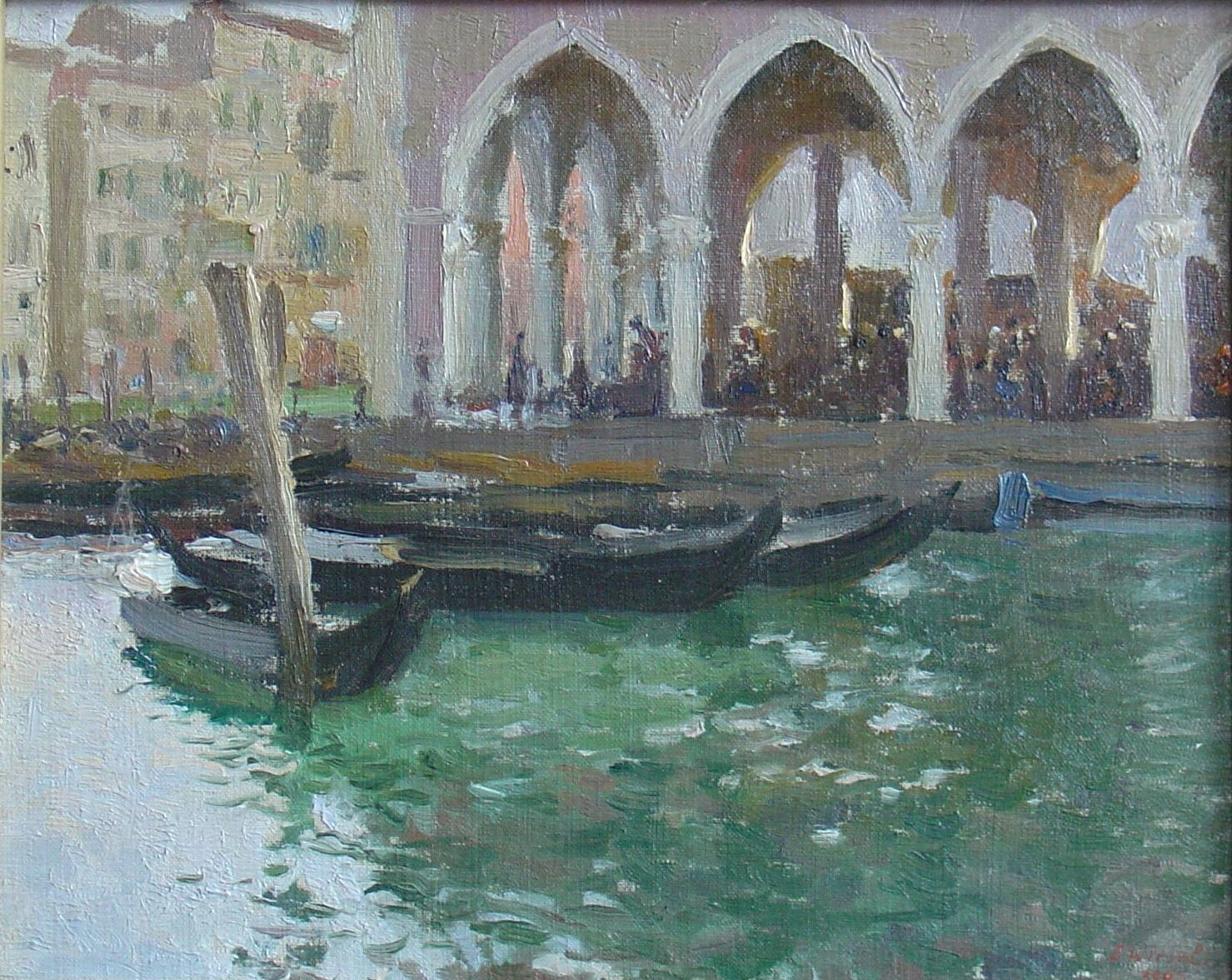
Venice

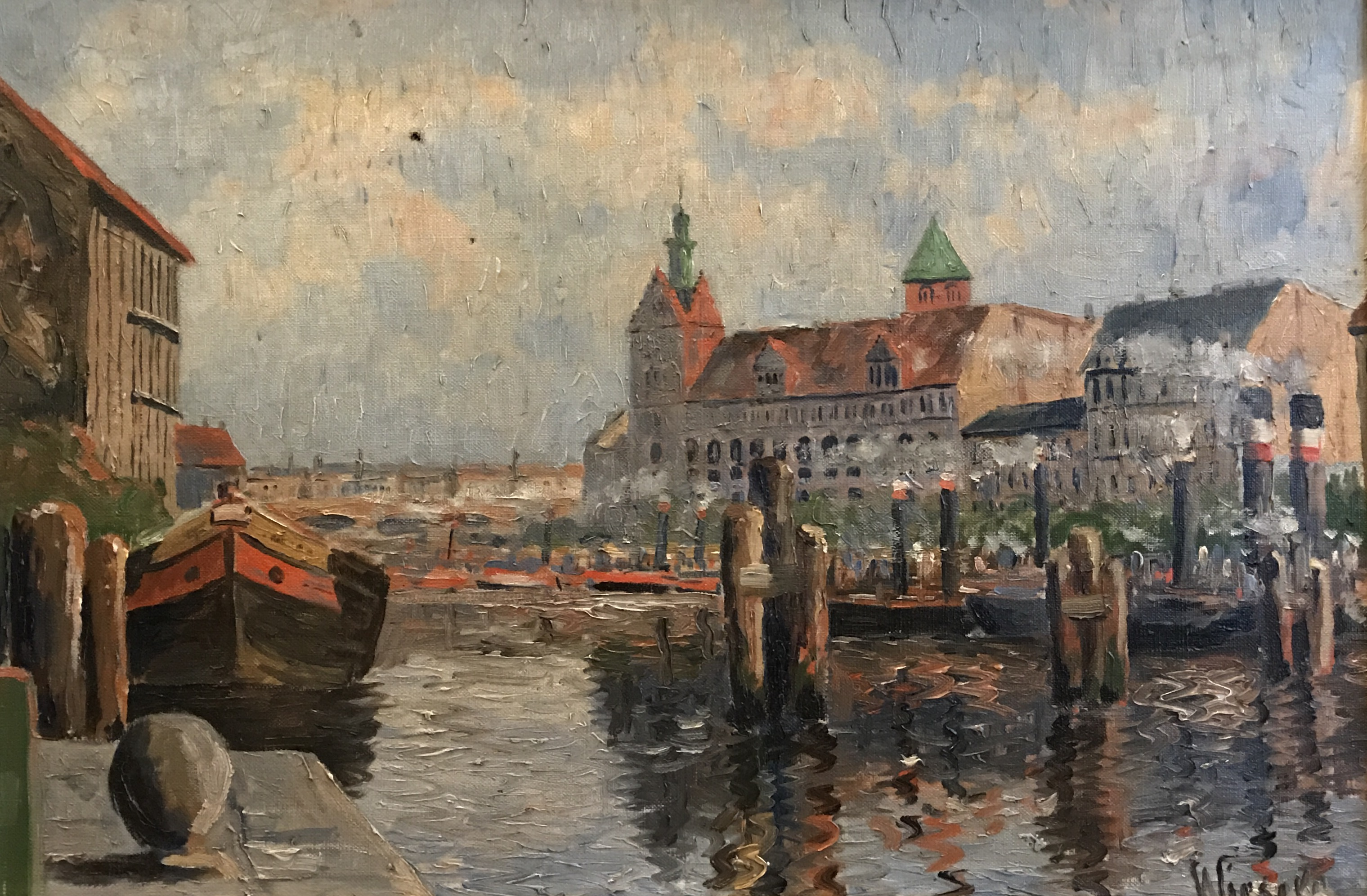
Venice

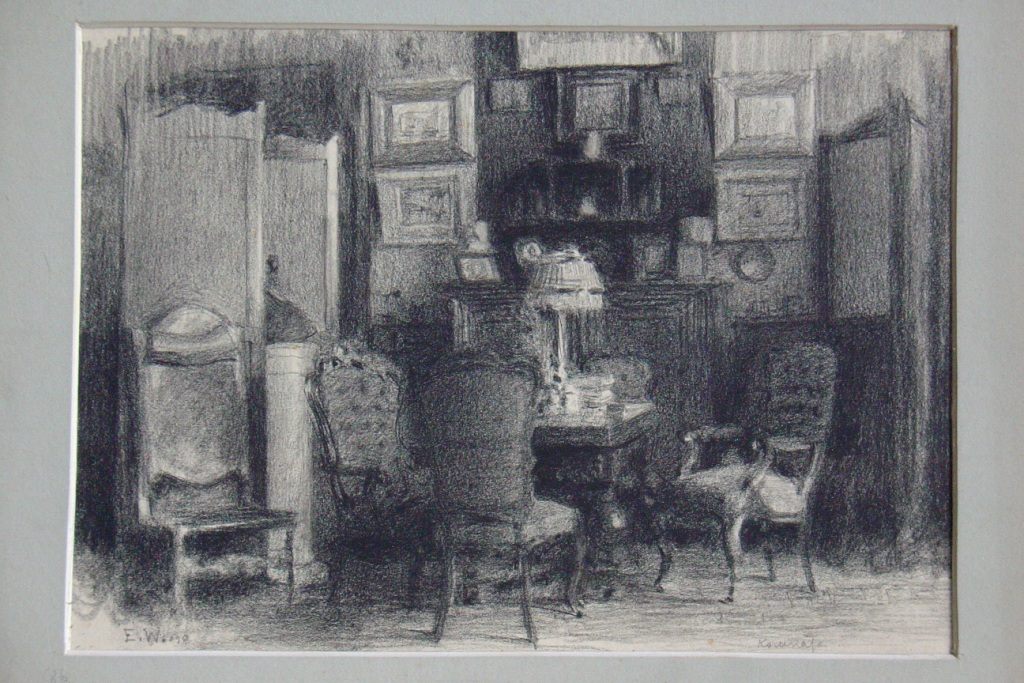
Apartment interior at Vasilyevsky Island

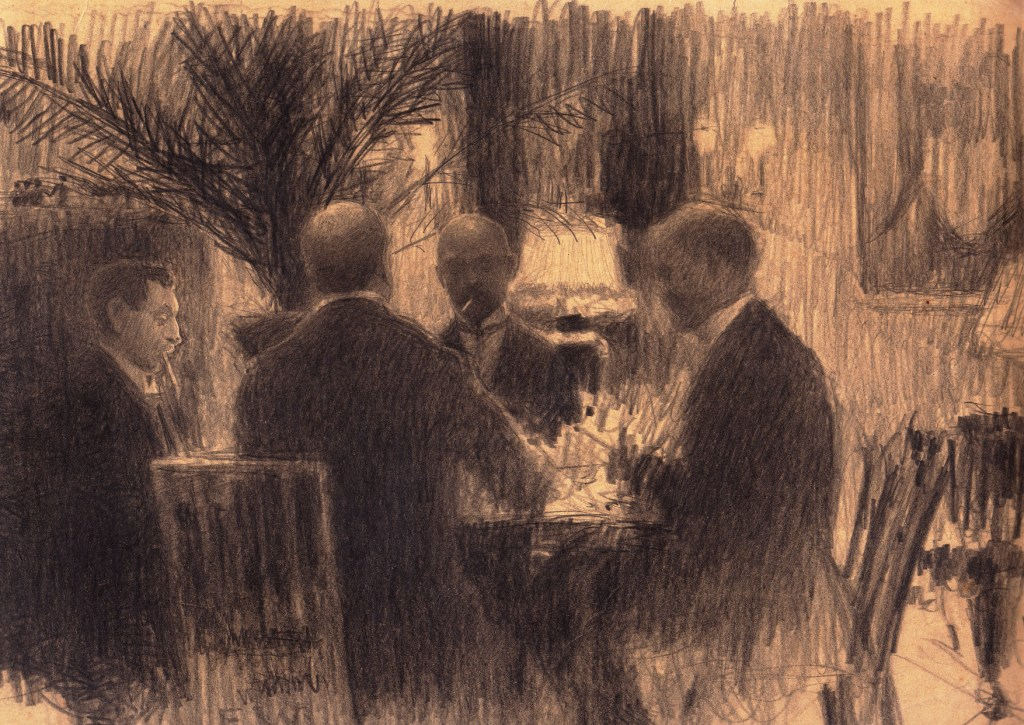
Preferans

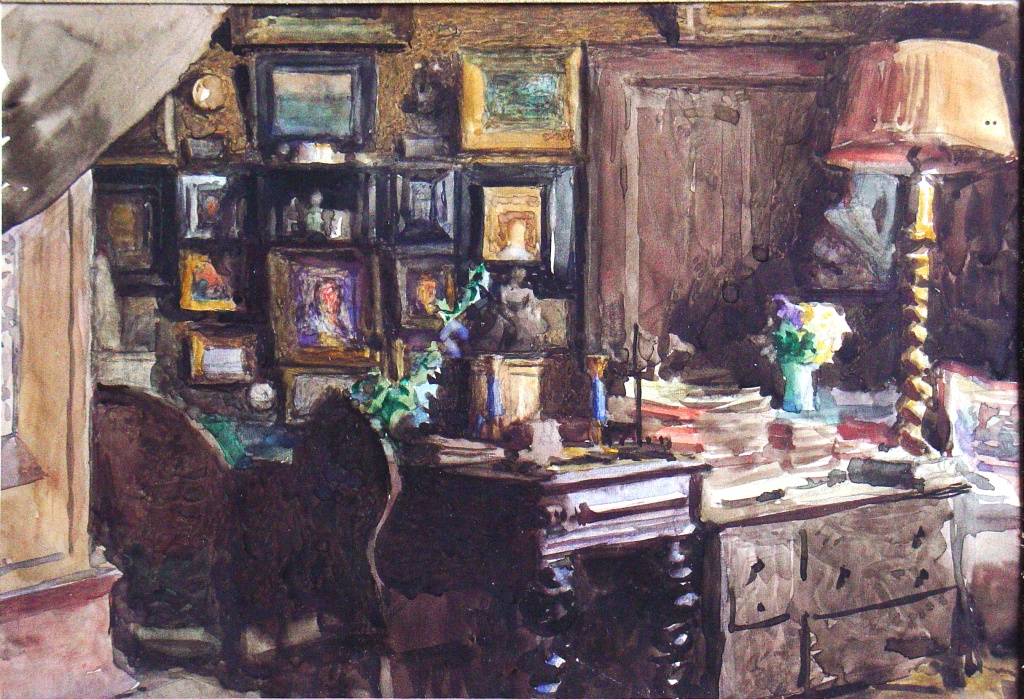
Wiesels' apartment interior

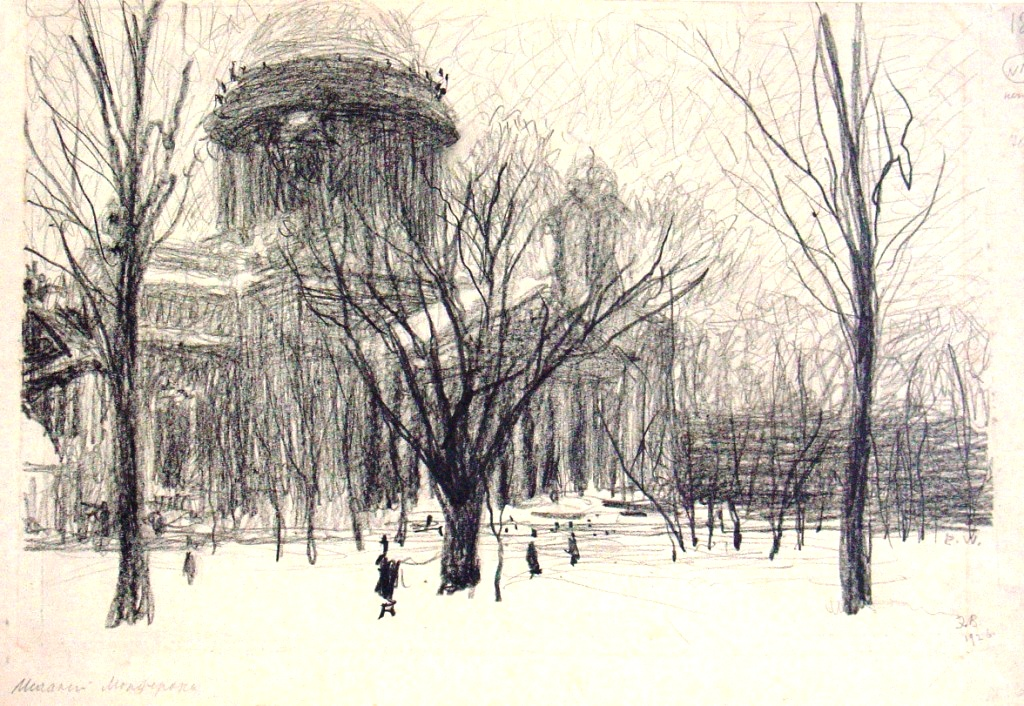
Saint Isaac's Cathedral

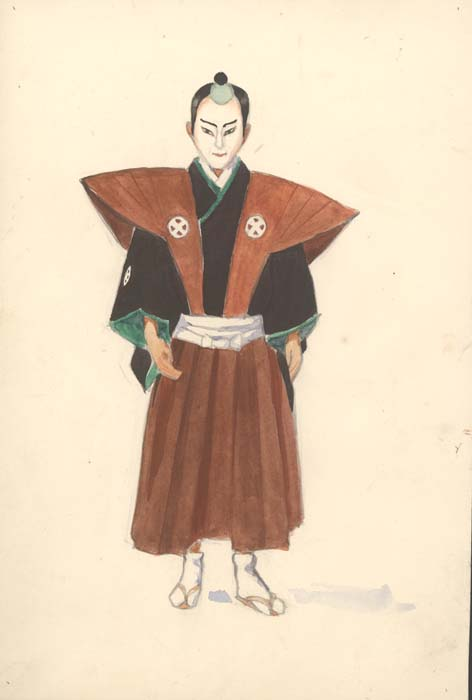
Kabuki Tour in Russia 1928: Sketch of Costume
