= Aleksey Suvorin =

Russian publisher and journalist (1834–1912)

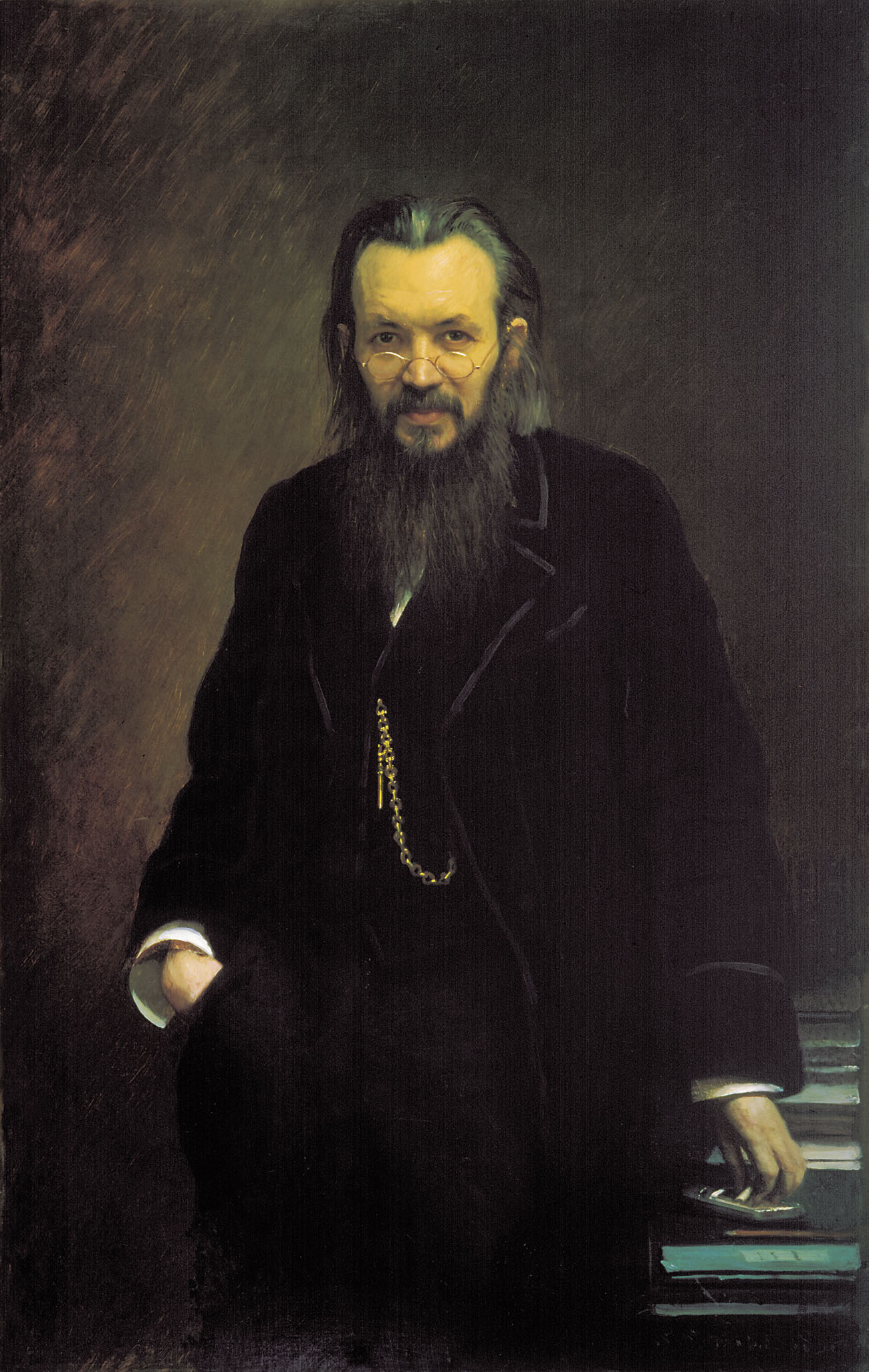
Portrait by Ivan Kramskoy, 1881.

Aleksei Sergeyevich Suvorin (Russian: Алексе́й Серге́евич Суво́рин; 23 September [O.S. 11 September] 1834, Korshevo, Voronezh Governorate – 24 August [O.S. 11 August] 1912, Tsarskoye Selo) was a Russian newspaper and book publisher and journalist whose publishing empire wielded considerable influence during the last decades of the Russian Empire.

He set out as a liberal journalist but, like many of his contemporaries, he experienced a dramatic shift in views, gradually drifting towards nationalism.

== Early career ==
Suvorin was a quintessential self-made man. Born of a peasant family, he succeeded in gaining access to a military school at Voronezh from which he graduated in 1850. In the following year, he arrived in St. Petersburg and joined a major artillery school there. With limited prospects of pursuing a military career, he spent eight years in his native haunts, teaching history and geography, first in Bobrov and then in Voronezh. No one could have predicted that within two or three decades, the provincial teacher would rise to become one of the most influential men in the empire.

A major step forward in his career was in 1861, when, electrified by the Emancipation Manifesto, he relocated to Moscow, where he found himself at the periphery of a burgeoning literary scene. At first money was tight, instigating Suvorin to move to St. Petersburg, where he joined the staff of the St. Petersburg Vedomosti, an influential newspaper with liberal leanings. He soon became its leading contributor and secretary to the editor in chief. Suvorin's feuilletons, published under the pen name "Stranger", were an instant sensation and inspired him to turn his attention to more creative writing.

== Publishing ==
Suvorin's personality as a writer is somewhat overshadowed by his journalism. Nevertheless, he was very prolific and published a number of short stories and plays in the major outlets of the liberal media of which he was considered a leader. Capitalising on that success, Suvorin set up a publishing venture in 1871. Among his first publications was the Russian Calendar, which was in high demand all over Russia, followed by an unprecedented series of cheap editions of classics, both foreign and Russian. He published the "Cheap Library" (Russian: Дешевая библиотека, romanized: Deshevaya Biblioteka) book series. For more demanding readers, he issued a suite of richly illustrated albums about the great art galleries of Europe.

In the late 19th century, he launched a series of city directories, published on an annual basis (each were between 500 and 1500 pages long) for St. Petersburg, Moscow and the rest of Russia that detailed the names and addresses of private residents, government offices, public services and medium and large businesses. They are often referred to as the Suvorin directories, from the publisher's name. The directories are often used by modern genealogists to trace family members who lived in Imperial and early Soviet Russia when vital records are missing or prove difficult to find. Historians use them to research the social histories of late 19th century and early 20th century Russia.

By the end of the century, Suvorin's bookstores were everywhere, in Moscow, St. Petersburg, Kharkov, Odessa, Rostov, Saratov. He held a monopoly on the distribution of printed matter on the railway stations and trains, and he was probably the most influential publisher in the country.

Starved himself many times and long periods of time, Suvorin wrote several volumes on nutrition and starvation.

== Novoye Vremya ==
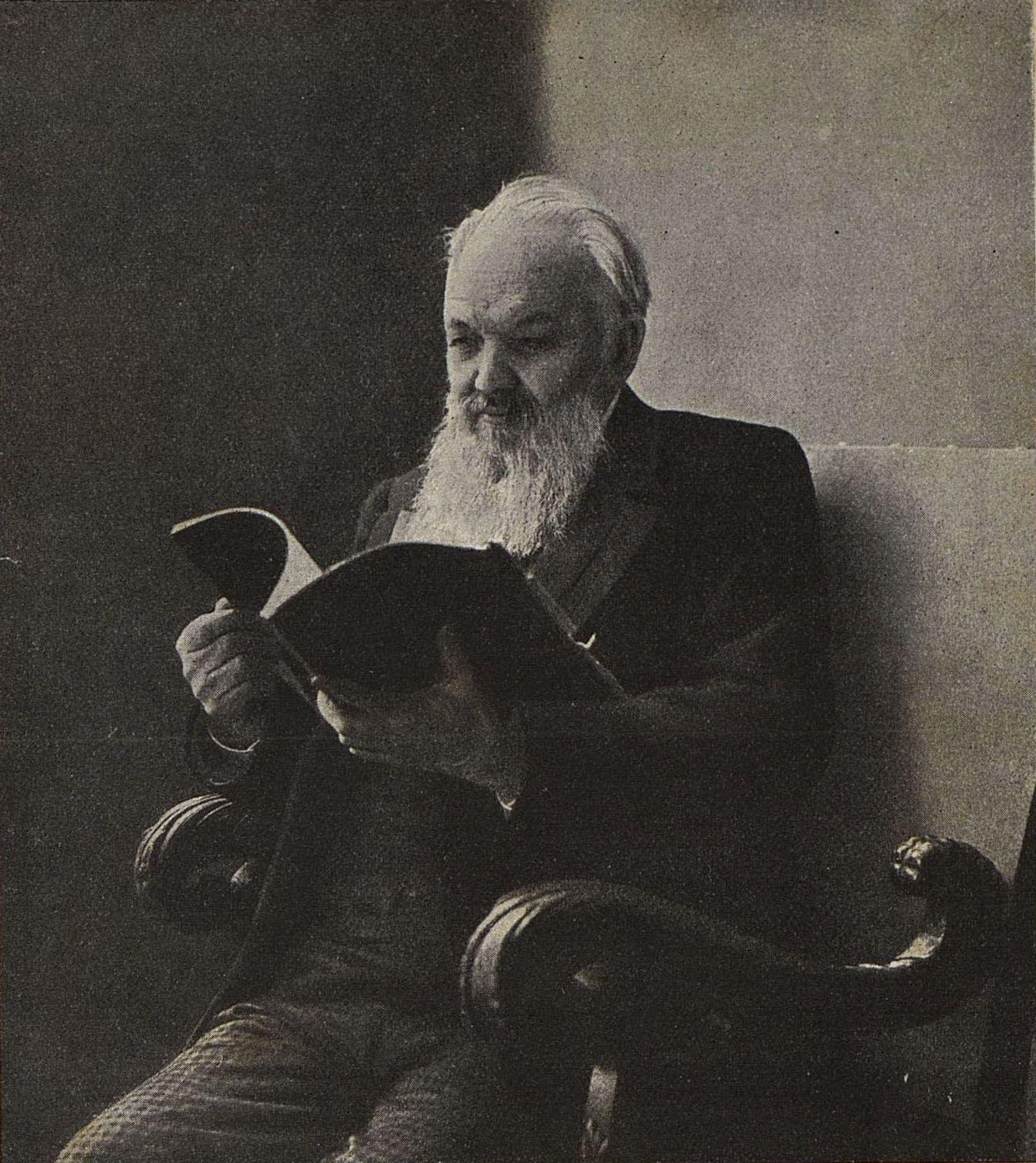
Suvorin in his old age.

In 1876, Suvorin acquired ownership of the failing newspaper Novoye Vremya ("New Times"); he remained the editor in chief until his death. In 1880, he founded a reputable historical journal, Istorichesky Vestnik. He confessed to favour the newspaper over his family and worked hard to expand its circulation. By the end of the 1880s, Novoye Vremya counted as one of the most profitable and up-to-date enterprises in the Russian publishing industry.

The venture brought him an opportunity of influencing the younger generation with his conservative and increasingly reactionary pronouncements in the vein of Mikhail Katkov and Konstantin Pobedonostsev. Novoye Vremya enthusiastically supported the policies of anti-Semitism and russification promoted by the government of Alexander III.

In his book on the Russian Revolution of 1905, one of the former leaders of that revolution, Leon Trotsky, described Suvorin's hatred for even the very idea of revolution: "'Revolution,' old Suvorin, that arch-reptile of the Russian bureaucracy, wrote at the end of November [1905], 'gives an extraordinary elan to men and gains a multitude of devoted, fanatical adherents who are prepared to sacrifice their lives. The struggle against revolution is so difficult precisely because it has so much fervor, courage, sincere eloquence, and ardent enthusiasm to contend with. The stronger the enemy, the more resolute and courageous revolution becomes, and with every victory it attracts a swarm of admirers. Anyone who does not know this, who does not know that revolution is attractive like a young, passionate woman with arms flung wide, showering avid kisses on you with hot, feverish lips, has never been young.'"

During Suvorin's declining years, Vasily Rozanov and several other popular journalists of his newspaper were allowed considerable discretion in airing their idiosyncratic views. They pioneered a new style of adversary journalism, which frequently bordered on personal attacks.

Suvorin's intense dislike of reform and reformers was deeply entrenched: back in 1873, his first wife had been shot dead by her lover, a liberal officer who proceeded to commit suicide. Another influence was Fyodor Dostoyevsky, with whom he was on close terms, especially during the last year of the novelist's life. Suvorin was succeeded at the helm of the family business by one of his sons. His grave is in the Alexander Nevsky Lavra.

== Suvorin Theatre ==
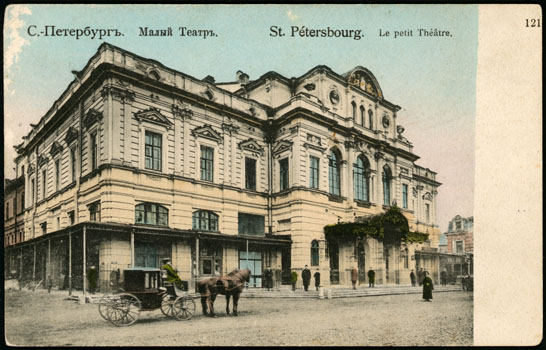
Suvorin Theatre, now Bolshoi Drama Theatre.

Ever since the 1860s, Suvorin had been interested in theatre and regularly published theatrical criticism. He befriended Anton Chekhov, when the latter was an aspiring journalist and became one of his few intimates. Their extensive correspondence is captivating reading. It illustrates the evolution of Chekhov's views on all aspects of Russia's life over the years. It has been noted that Chekhov was so blinded by his affection towards Suvorin that he wrote a one-act sequel to his anti-Semitic play.

By the second half of the 1890s, when Chekhov finally distanced himself from Suvorin, the latter had plunged headlong into theatre. With secure financial backing, he launched his own stage company in 1895. His powerful connections allowed him to get the censorship lifted on Leo Tolstoy's The Power of Darkness, which was premiered at his theatre. Before long, Suvorin's predilection for controversial pieces made his theatre unpopular with the upper classes. At the opening night of The Sons of Israel (1900), "the actors were pelted with apples, galoshes, and other missiles".

The reputation of Suvorin's theatre was so negative that after completing The Cherry Orchard, Chekhov wrote to his wife that he would not give the play to Suvorin even if he offered him 100,000 rubles and that he despised Suvorin's establishment. Despite the negative publicity, the company survived its founder and continued to operate profitably until the October Revolution, under the name Maly Imperial Theatre (Малый Императорский Театр). In retrospect, it appears to have been "the most important private theatre in St. Petersburg".

Since 1920, the building of the theatre, at 65 Fontanka Embankment, became the home of Bolshoi Drama Theatre (now known as Tovstonogov Drama Theatre).

== Sources ==
- Динерштейн Е.А. А.С. Суворин: Человек, сделавший карьеру. ISBN 5-86004-123-3. Moscow, 1998.
- Ambler, Effie. The Career of Aleksei S. Suvorin, Russian Journalism and Politics, 1861–1881. Wayne State University Press, 1972.
- Encyclopaedia of St. Petersburg
