= Die Völkerfreiheit (Kiev) =

- Founded: 31 May 1919
- Ceased publication: August 1919
- Political alignment: Communism
- Language: German language
- Headquarters: 23, Lyuteranska Street, Kiev

Die Völkerfreiheit ('Peoples' Freedom') was a German-language newspaper published in Kiev between 31 May 1919 and August 1919. Die Völkerfreiheit was a continuation of Weltkommune ('World Commune'), a German-language communist publication which had been founded in Kharkov in late 1918.

It was the organ of the German Group of the Ukrainian Communist Party (Spartakus Group) in Kiev. The editorial office of Die Völkerfreiheit was located at 23, Lyuteranska Street. Copies of the newspaper were sold for 60 kopeks.

Copies of Die Völkerfreiheit were also distributed among prisoners of war.
