= House with Chimaeras =

Art Nouveau building in Kyiv, Ukraine

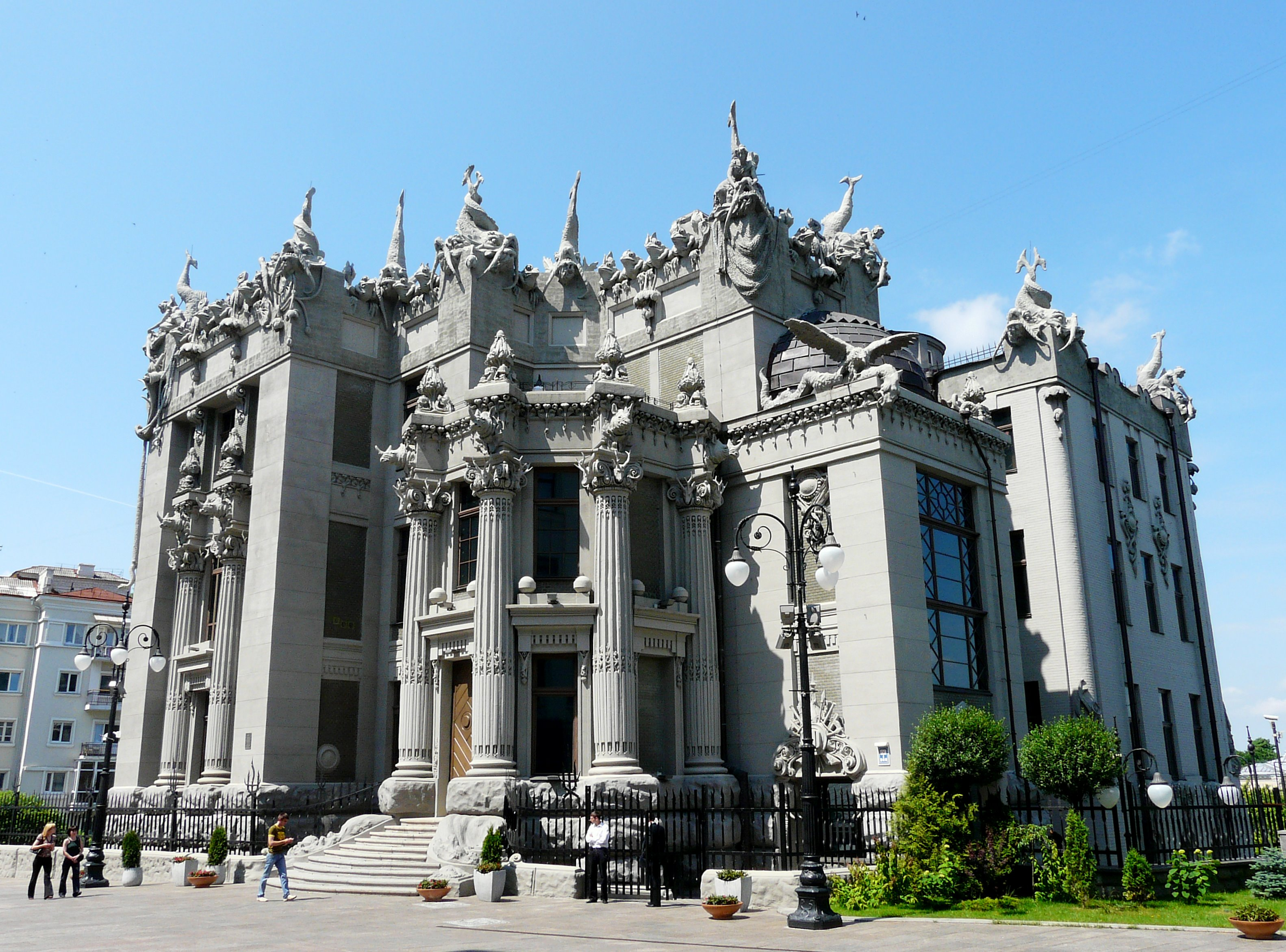
- The front façade of the House with Chimaeras
- Interactive map of the House with Chimaeras area

General information
- Architectural style: Art Nouveau
- Location: Lypky, Kyiv, Ukraine, 10 Bankova Street
- Coordinates: 50°26′42″N 30°31′43″E
- Construction started: 1901
- Completed: 1902

Technical details
- Structural system: Concrete piles Continuous foundation
- Floor count: 3 (Bankova); 6 (Franko Square)
- Floor area: 3,309.5 m^{2} (35,623.16 sq ft)

Design and construction
- Architect: Władysław Horodecki

House with Chimaeras (Ukrainian: Будинок з химерами, romanized: Budynok z khymeramy) or Horodetsky House (named for Władysław Horodecki) is an Art Nouveau building located in the historic Lypky neighborhood of Kyiv, the capital of Ukraine. Situated across the street from the President of Ukraine's office at No. 10, Bankova Street, the building has been used as a presidential residence for official and diplomatic ceremonies since 2005. The street in front of the building is closed off to all automobile traffic, and is now a patrolled pedestrian zone due to its proximity to the Presidential Administration building.

The Polish architect Władysław Horodecki originally constructed the House with Chimaeras for use as his own upmarket apartment building during 1901–1902. However, as the years went by, Horodecki eventually had to sell the building due to financial troubles, after which it changed ownership numerous times before finally being occupied by an official Communist Party polyclinic until the early 2000s. When the building was vacated, its interior and exterior decor were fully reconstructed and restored according to Horodecki's original plans.

The building derives its popular name from the ornate decorations depicting exotic animals and hunting scenes, which were sculpted by Italian architect Emilio Sala, since Horodecki was an avid hunter. The name does not refer to the chimaera of mythology, but to an architectural style known as chimaera decoration in which animal figures are applied as decorative elements to a building. Horodecki's unique architectural style earned him praise as the Antoni Gaudí of Kyiv.

== History ==
=== Construction and early history ===
A House with Chimaeras was designed by the Polish architect Władysław Horodecki in 1901–1902. Horodecki was born in 1863 into a prosperous Polish szlachta (noble) family in the Podillia region. After finishing the Imperial Academy of Arts in Saint Petersburg in 1890, he moved to Kyiv, where he lived for almost 30 years. At the time of the building's construction, Horodecki had already established himself as a prominent Kyiv architect, having designed and constructed together with his close friend and partner engineer Anton Strauss many city buildings, from the St. Nicholas Roman Catholic Cathedral to the Karaite Kenesa and what today is the National Art Museum of Ukraine. Besides architecture, Horodecki was also interested in big-game hunting, which explains why his building features many animals.

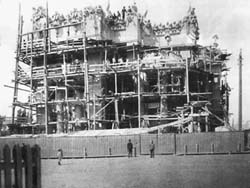
The building under construction, 1902

Horodecki financed the house's construction with borrowed money, with the intent for it to be an apartment building. Each floor formed a single apartment, connected by an elevator and stairs. (Note: The only exception to this was that the lowest floor of the building contained two separate apartments.) Horodecki himself occupied the fourth floor of the building, measuring at about 380 m^{2} (4,100 sq ft). (Note: His apartment is apt. No. 3, the main floor, if looking from the level of the Bankova Street.)

Horodecki bought the first lot of land on February 1, 1901, with construction work commencing on March 18 of that year. Construction of the exterior walls was finished by August 21, and the roof installed and all masonry work was completed on September 13. Due to the economic hardships within the Russian Empire, the completion of the building was delayed. In May 1903, only one apartment on the lowest level and Horodecki's own apartment were occupied. The total cost of the land and construction amounted to 133,000 rubles. (Note: This price is as of 1903. Government Archive of the City of Kyiv – Fond No. 143, Series 2, File No. 520, Item No. 9. In the late 19th and early 20th century, one thousand Russian rubles were worth about 24.89 gold troy ounces, or roughly one million Russian rubles as of 2011.) In total, 1,550 m^{2} (16,700 sq ft) of land were used for construction of the building and cost a total of 15,640 rubles. The projected annual profit from the rentals was 7,200 rubles. A cowshed was located on the premises due to Horodecki's insistence on fresh in-house milk, though it was specifically placed in a way that the smell of the cows would not disturb the tenants. On a lot adjacent to the building, a miniature alpine garden (approx. 320 m^{2} or 3,400 sq ft) and a fountain were built.

A furnished interior room seen with elaborate decorations

Due to financial mismanagement which included his Safari hunting hobby, in July 1912, Horodecki pledged the building as a collateral against a loan taken from Kyiv Mutual Credit Association. When Horodecki defaulted on the loan, the building was auctioned off in 1913, and became the property of the engineer Daniel Balakhovsky, the son of a Kyiv trader, who was also the chairman of the Board of Directors of Blahodatinskoe sugar factory, and a French сonsular agent in Kyiv. In 1916, the house belonged to the Blahodatinskoe sugar factory. In 1918, the building's ownership changed again, to Samuel Nemets. In 1921, after the Bolsheviks gained control of Kyiv, several of the departments of the Kyiv Military District took offices in the House with Chimaeras.

=== Ownership 1921–2002 ===
After the period of unrest following the Russian Revolution of 1917, the building was nationalized and later converted for communal living. Each apartment was occupied by about nine to ten families. During the Second World War (1941–1943), the building was abandoned. Due to exposure to the harsh elements during the war, the building suffered significant damage to its structure. After the war, the building was briefly used as a residence for evacuated actors from the Ivan Franko Theater; however, the Central Committee of the Communist Party of the Ukrainian Soviet Socialist Republic took ownership of the building and later transformed it into the Polyclinic No. 1 for their elite. The polyclinic used the building up until the end of the 20th century. During that time, the building almost split in half. One part sagged 22 cm (9 in), and a major vertical crack formed, having a width of about 40 cm (16 in). Some of the building's architectural details had either been chipped away, or had cracked.

The building's restoration work was scheduled for 2002, however the operators of the polyclinic were reluctant to leave, having occupied the building for over 40 years. In order to force the occupants out of the building, the workers boarded up all of the windows and threatened to do the same to the doors if the polyclinic did not vacate the premises. Only the president's involvement in the matter forced the polyclinic to move out completely.

=== Reconstruction and official use ===
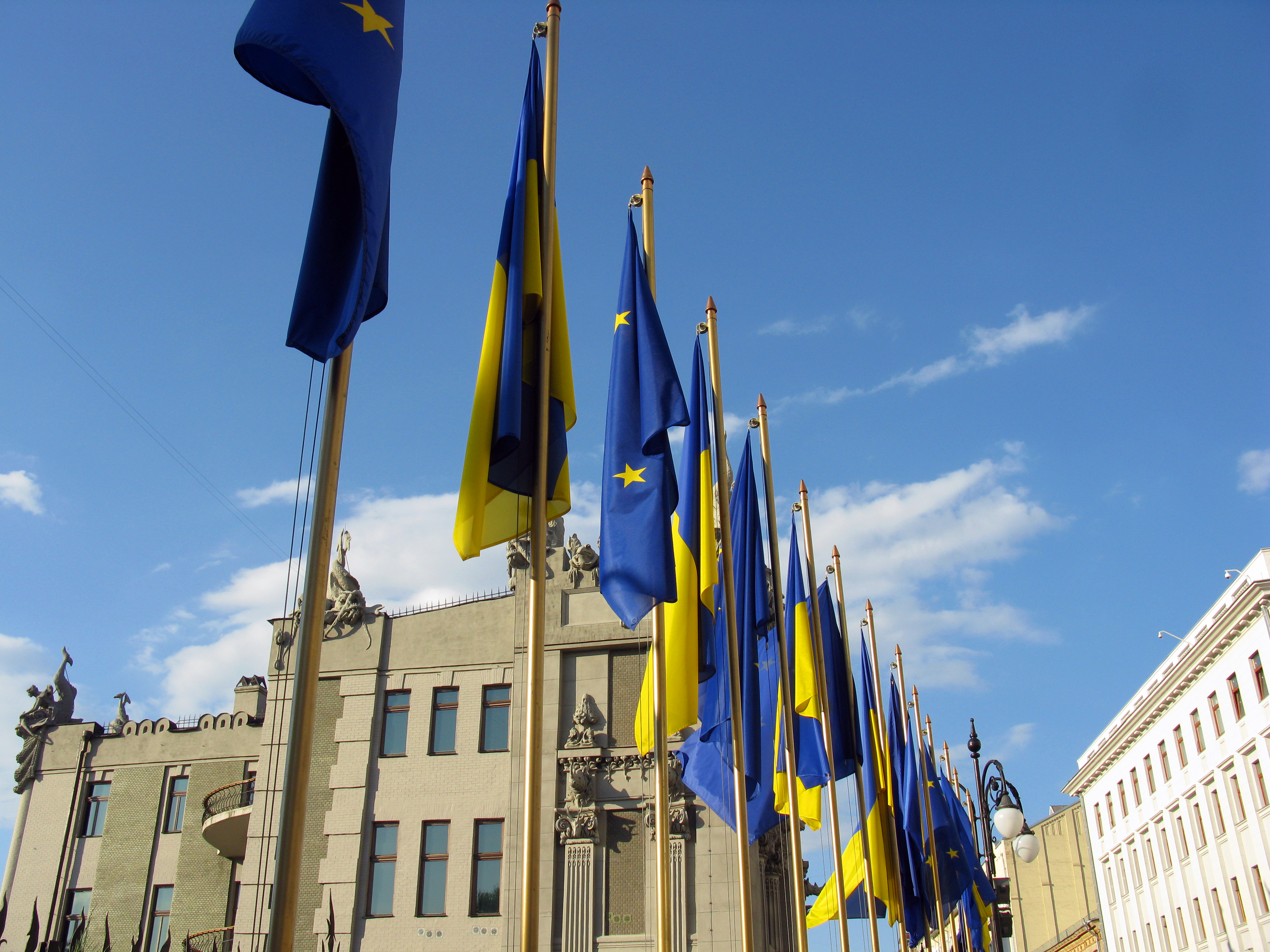
Flags of Ukraine and the European Union in front of the building during an official event

During the time of the restoration, conducted by UkrNIIProektRestavratsiya and headed by Natalia Kosenko, the workers unearthed the whole lower floor, which had been filled in during Soviet times to strengthen the building's foundation. The elaborate decor of the interior had to be fully redone. In the courtyard, the restorers placed an artificial lake, fountains, and a miniature garden—all of which had been in Horodecki's original plans.

The building was opened as a filial "Masterpieces of Ukrainian Art" of the National Museum of Arts in November 2004. It was expected that the building would serve a dual purpose as a museum and as the presidential meeting place for state visitors. In April 2005, the Kyiv City Council submitted a bill for ₴104 million (approx. US$20 million) to the Ukrainian Government for reconstruction and restoration of the House with Chimaeras. The council also allowed the Ukrainian government to construct a new square (closing off all automobile traffic) in front of the building for use in official ceremonies.

Since May 2005, the building has been an official presidential residence, used for official and diplomatic ceremonies. The House with Chimaeras was used as a meeting place between Ukrainian President Viktor Yushchenko and Russian President Vladimir Putin, when the latter visited Kyiv on December 22, 2006. Included in the building are rooms for negotiations, tête-à-tête talks, the signing of official documents, as well as a special room for the press.

== Architecture ==
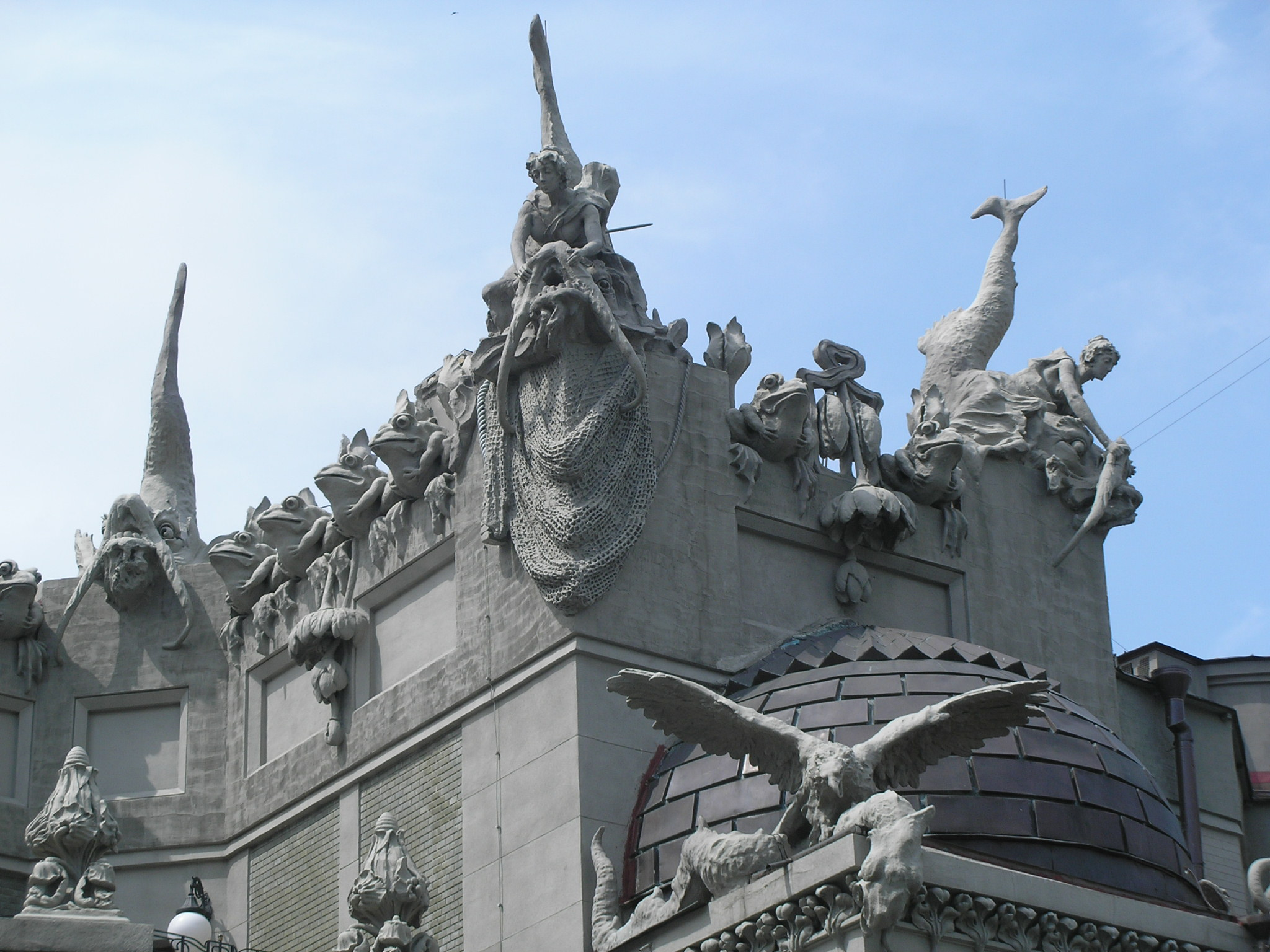
A detailed view of the architectural statues of mermaids, amphibians and other creatures designed by Emilio Sala

Volodymyr Yasiievych
The House of Władysław Horodecki can only be compared with the works of Antoni Gaudí, especially the famous Casa Milà in Barcelona, Spain, despite being constructed a couple of years later (1905–1910).

The building was designed in the Art Nouveau style, which was at that time a relatively new style and featured flowing, curvilinear designs often incorporating floral and other plant-inspired motifs. Horodecki featured such motifs in the building's exterior decor in the forms of mythical creatures and big-game animals. His work on the House with Chimaeras has earned him the nickname of the Gaudí of Kyiv.

Due to the steep slope on which the building is situated, it had to be specially designed out of concrete to fit into its foundations correctly. From the front, the building appears to have only three floors. However, from the rear, all of its six floors can be seen. One part of the building's foundation was made of concrete piles, and the other as a continuous foundation. Usually, these two approaches do not mix well but Horodecki somehow succeeded in overcoming this technical problem.

The Italian sculptor Emilio Sala was responsible for both the internal and external sculptural decorations, such as mermaids, dolphins, and frogs on the roof of the building, sinking ships and hunting trophies on the exterior walls, and exuberant interior decorations, such as grand stairways and chandeliers depicting huge catfish strangled in the stems of lotus flowers. The exterior sculptures created by Sala were made out of cement. Production of the cement was by the «For» company of which Horodecki was the co-director. Cement was used exclusively as the primary building material by the request of the company's head director, Richter. At the time of the building's construction, cement was not popular as a building material, so its use was employed as publicity for both the house and the building material.

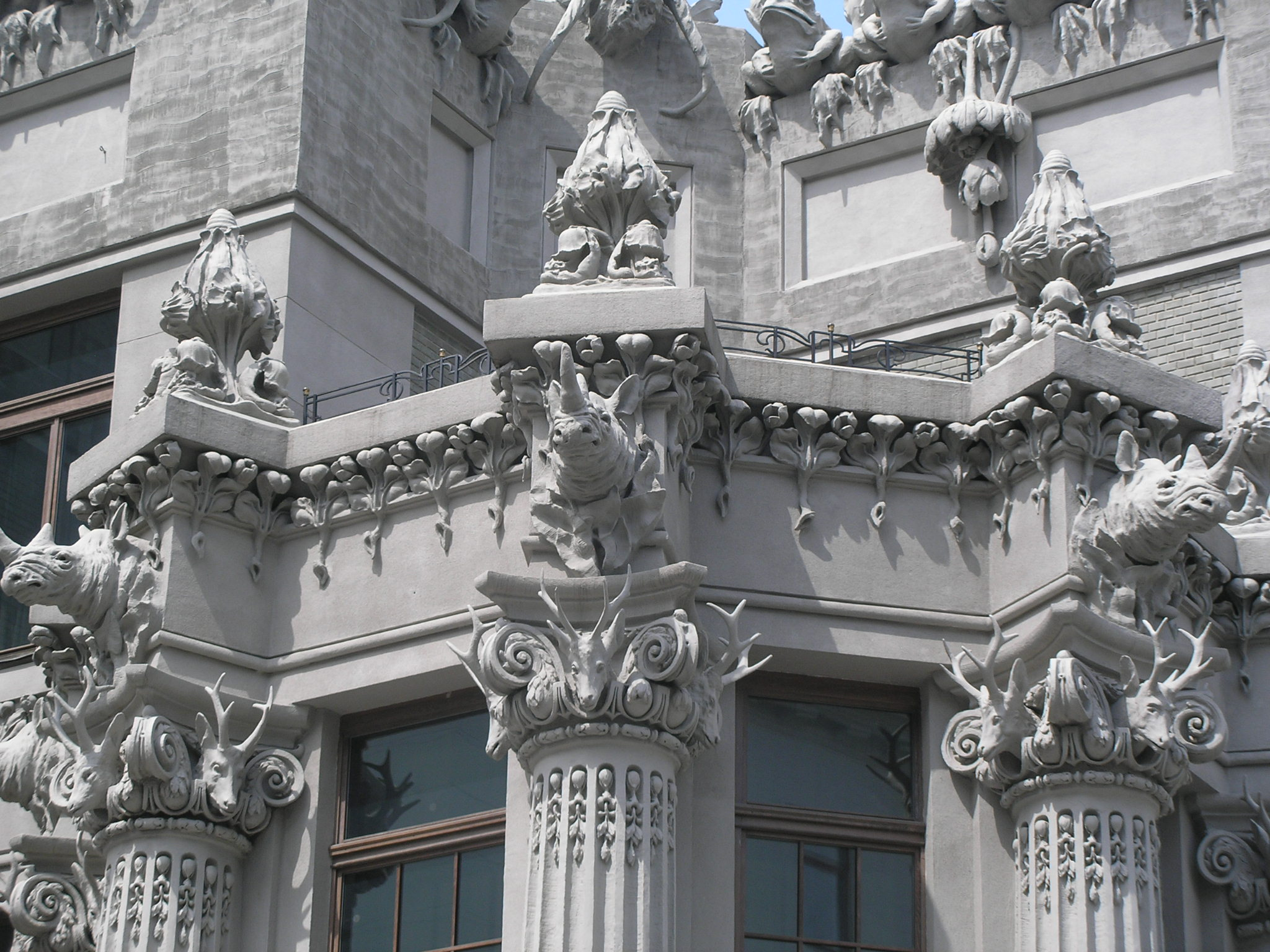
Elaborate cement decorations, featuring deer and rhinoceroses

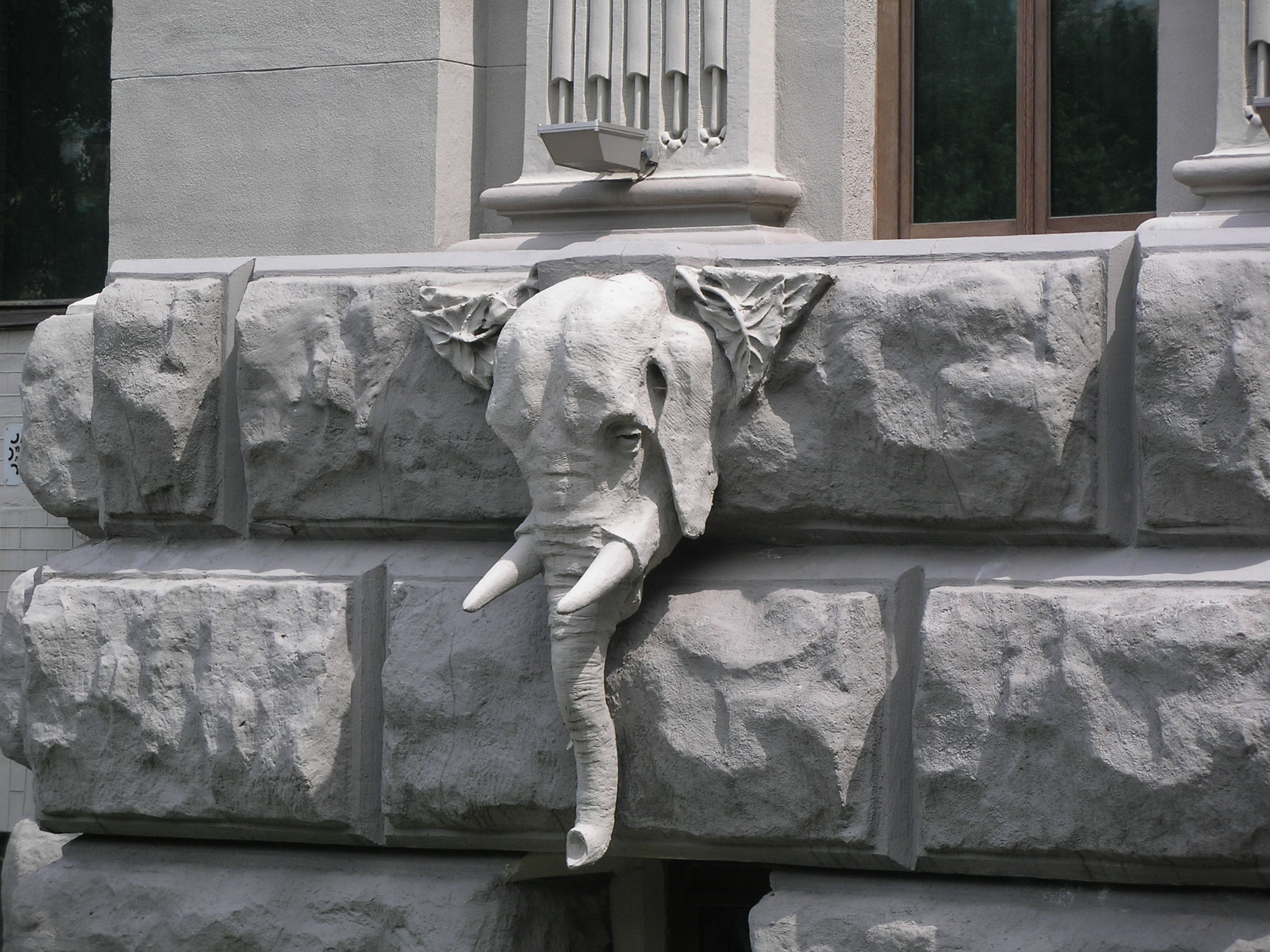
The building features various carvings, such as this elephant-head gargoyle

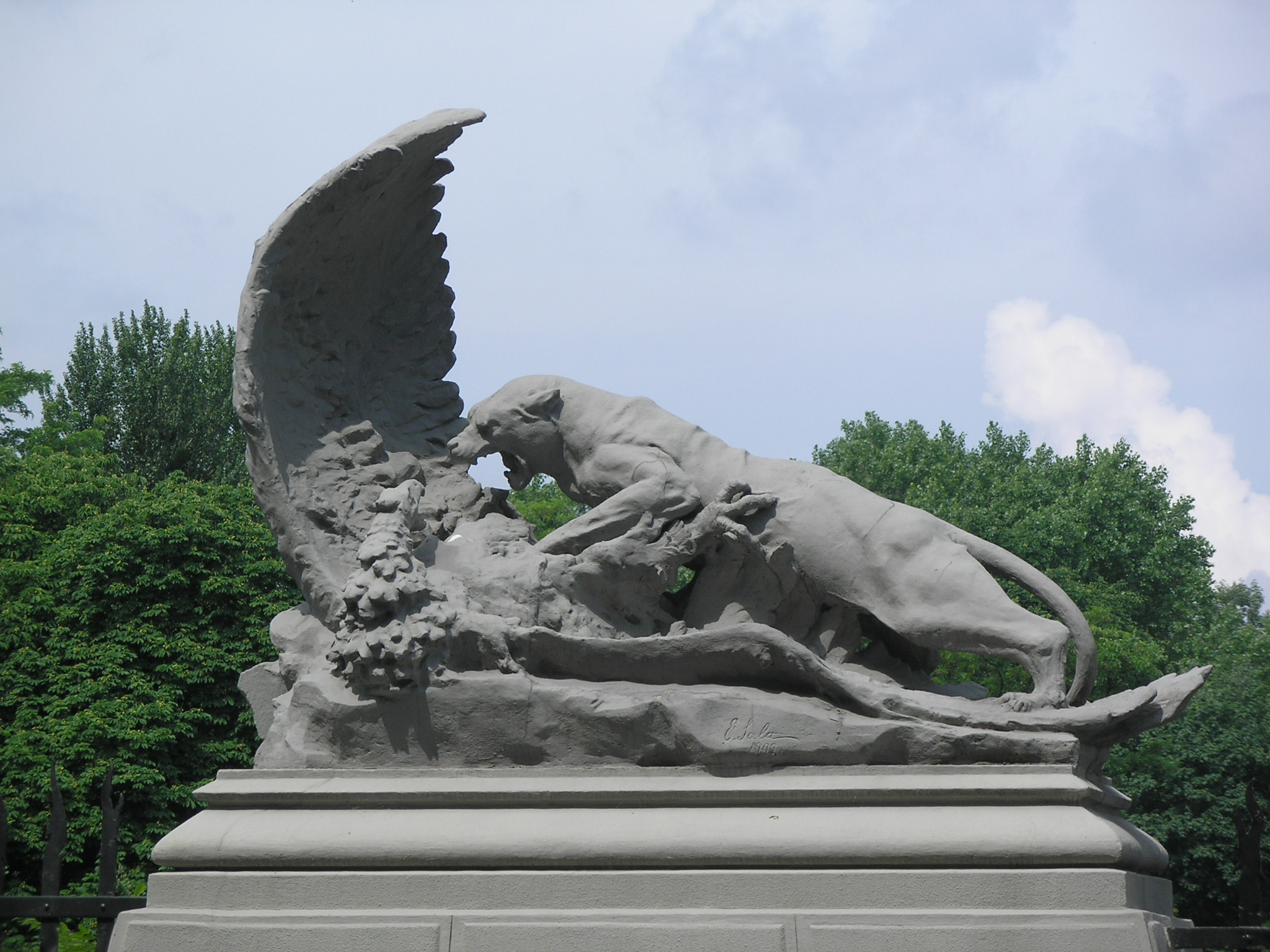
One of the many figurines seen around the building

=== Floor plan ===
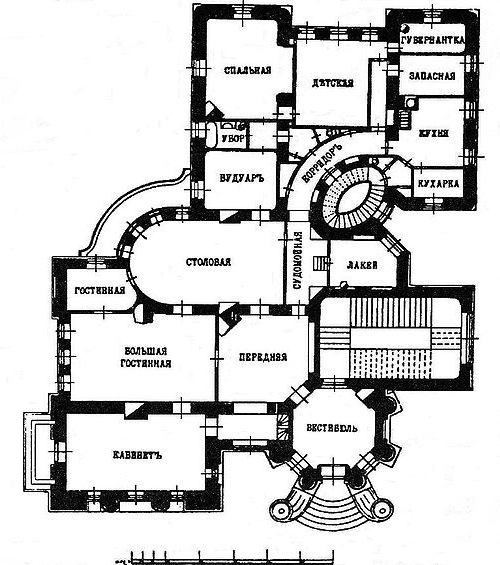
Horodecki's original blueprints of his own apartment, located on the sixth floor; early 1900s

The House with Chimaeras was designed in such a way that the tenants would occupy the whole floor, each floor had all the necessary household rooms ranging from private kitchens to small powder rooms. The open floor plan and extra rooms featured throughout the building are characteristic of the houses of the wealthy of the early 20th century. In total, the building has an area of 3,309.5 m^{2} (35,623.16 sq ft).

On the lowest level of the building, which is located deep in the hill, were two stables, two rooms for coachmen, a shared laundry, and two separate apartments. Each of the two apartments consisted of a foyer, a kitchen, one bathroom, and a storage room. The first of these apartments had two residential rooms, and the second three rooms. (Note: The annual rental in 1903 was 540 and 420 rubles, accordingly.) Each floor above the lowest level was designed to house a single apartment only.

The apartment on the second floor consisted of six residential rooms in addition to a foyer, kitchen, buffet, three servant's rooms, a bathroom, two toilets, and two storage rooms. There were also four wine cellars on the same level. (Note: The price for this apartment was 1,200 rubles in 1903.) The cellars belonged to the apartments on the upper levels. On the third floor, the apartment consisted of eight residential rooms, a foyer, a kitchen, dish washing room, two rooms for servants, a bathroom, and two toilets. (Note: The initial annual rent for the apartment was 2,000 rubles.) This apartment was placed slightly lower than the level of Bankova Street, from the front entrance.

The grandest apartment, which belonged to Horodecki, consisted of a study, a great room and a living room, a dining room, a boudoir, a bedroom, a children's room, a room for a governess, a guest room, three rooms for servants, a kitchen, dishwashing room, bathroom, two toilets, and two storage rooms. On the floor above was an apartment similar in size and design to Horodecki's apartment. (Note: Both of these apartments were rented out for 3,500 rubles annually in 1903.) The apartment on the top floor had one less room; to make up for this, there was a connecting terrace which provided a panoramic view of the city. (Note: The rental cost for this dwelling was 2,750 rubles annually. For comparison, an average salary for a librarian was about 50 rubles per year.)

== Legends ==
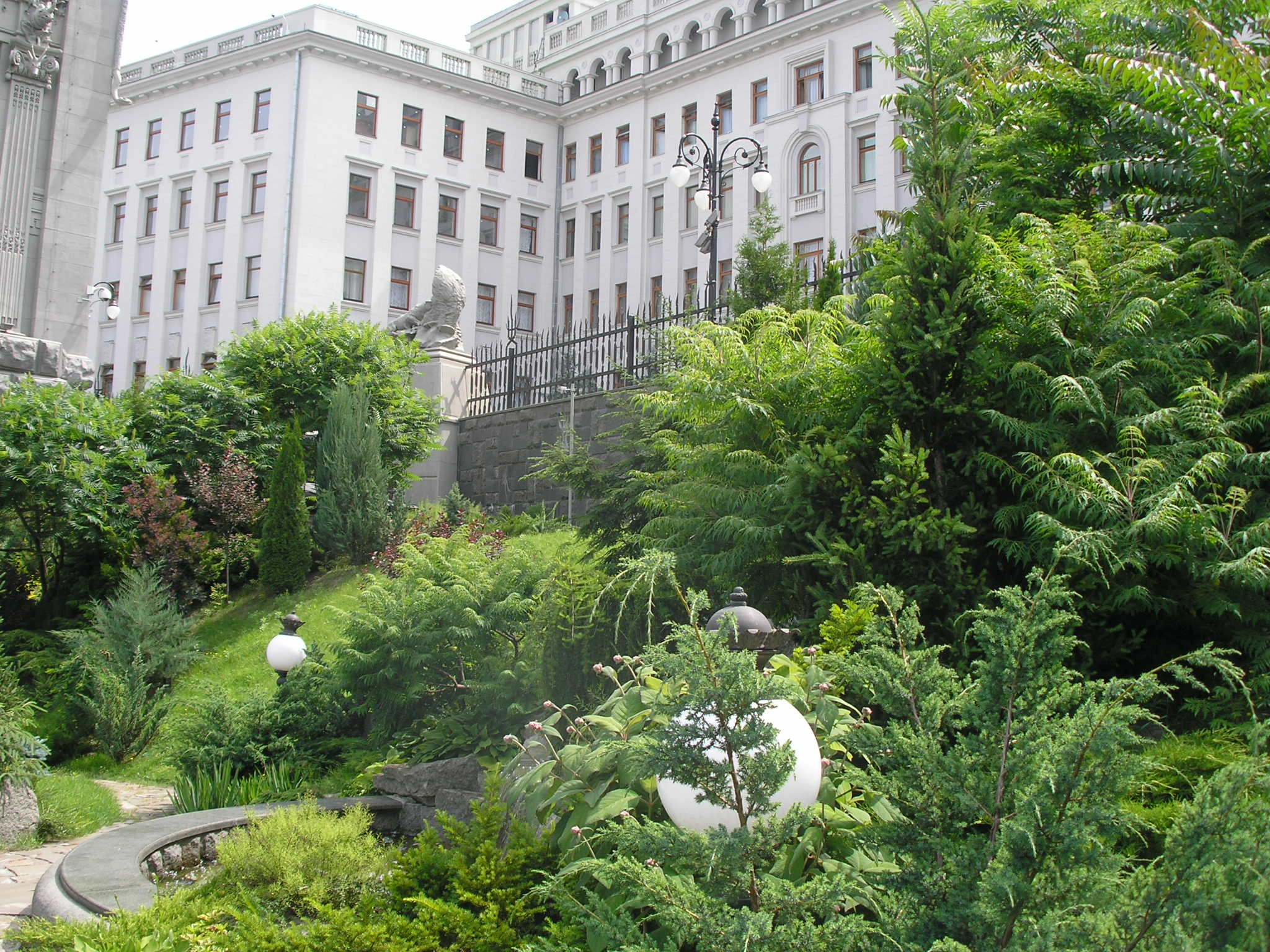
Gardens adjoining the building with the Presidential building seen in the background

Throughout the years, the unusual nature of the House with Chimaeras has given rise to a number of stories occasionally repeated in guide-books or newspapers, which are however either untrue or lacking any verifiable source.

According to the first legend, Władysław Horodecki's daughter had committed suicide jumping into the Dnieper River either because of some unfortunate love affair or because of a family feud. (Note: It was actually previous owner's (Professor Mering) daughter who drowned.) As a result, Horodecki went slightly mad and built this gloomy house in his daughter's memory.

A second legend has it that Horodecki made a bet with some other architects, including the architect Alexander Skobelev, who had tried to prove that was impossible to build a house on such terrain, because the site (near the Ivan Franko Theater) overhangs a swamp (Koz'ye boloto). The Construction Committee of Kyiv had prohibited construction of any structures on this particular lot, but eventually the construction of the building allowed Horodecki to win the bet.

According to the third legend, Horodecki had cursed it in 1913 (due to his inability to repay his creditors); all of the house's tenants would be either unhappy or would meet some sort of financial misfortune. There is a story that all the businesses who rented a portion of the building either went bankrupt, had their funds stolen or were disbanded.
