= Bankova =

Bankova may refer to:

- Bankova Street in Kyiv, Ukraine
- The Bankova: the Presidential Administration of Ukraine, whose offices are located on Bankova Street
