= Presidential Office Building (Kyiv) =

Government building in Ukraine

Coordinates: 50.444555°N 30.528871°E

- Будинок Секретаріату Президента
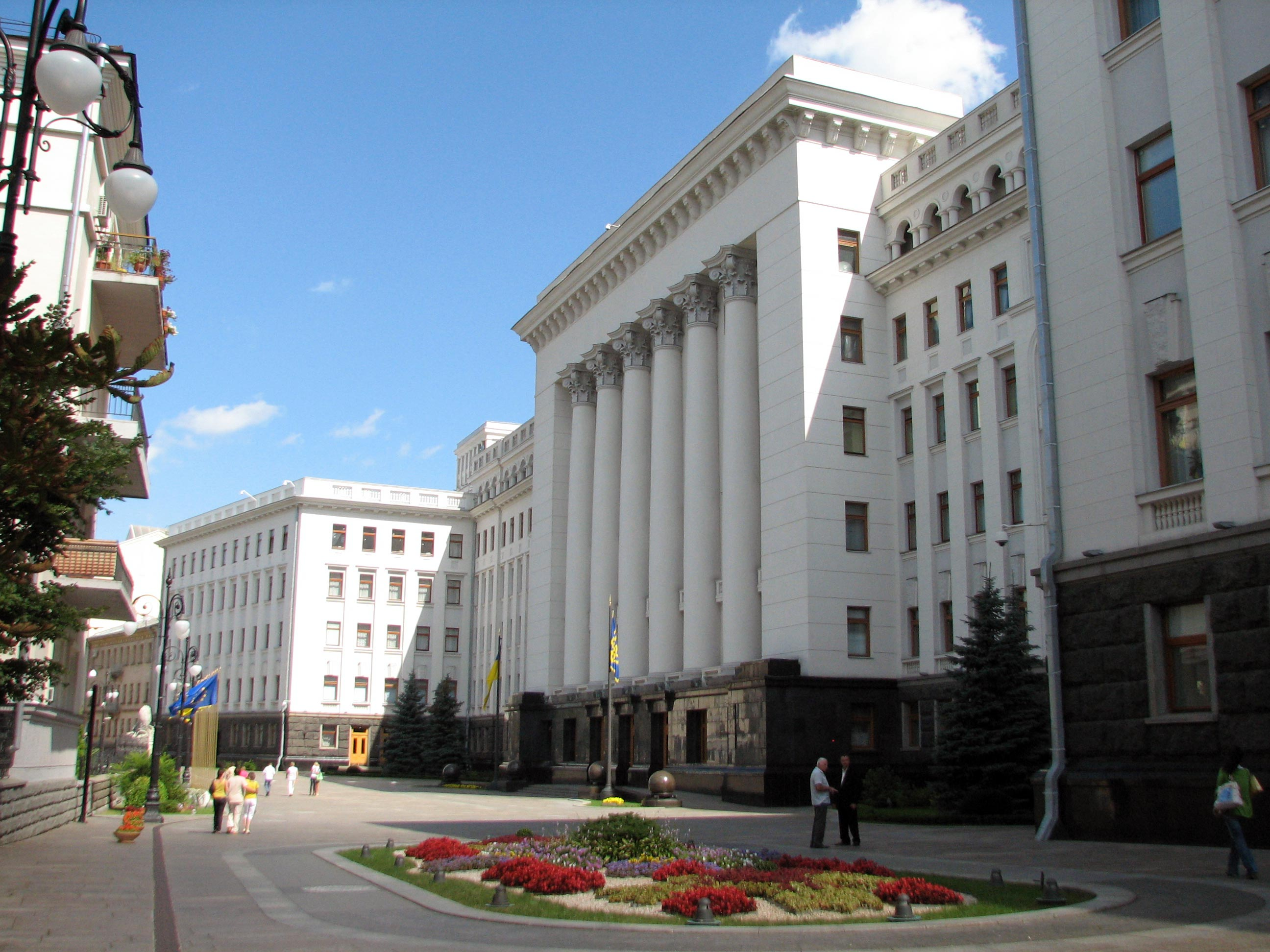
- The Bankova façade
- Interactive map of the Presidential Office Building area

General information
- Architectural style: Classical style and Ukrainian Baroque
- Location: 11 Bankova vulytsia, Kyiv, Ukraine
- Current tenants: Office of the President of Ukraine; RNBO
- Construction started: 1936
- Completed: 1939
- Owner: Kiev Military District (1939–1941); Kiev General-Komissariat (1941–1943); Central Committee of the Communist Party of Ukraine (1943–1991); Government of Ukraine (1991–present)

Design and construction
- Architect: Serhiy Grigoriev

The Presidential Office Building (Ukrainian: Будинок Секретаріату Президента, romanized: Budynok Sekretariatu Prezydenta), colloquially called Bankova, is an architectural monument of Kyiv, the capital of Ukraine. The building is the main office of the Office of the President of Ukraine and of the National Security and Defense Council of Ukraine.

It is located at 11 Bankova vulytsia and was initially a reconstruction of the Kyiv Military District headquarters that was built sometime in the 1870s to Oleksandr Shile's design. The building is considered the peak of an architectural artistic work and was built after all government institutions of the Ukrainian SSR were transferred to Kyiv from Kharkiv.

== History ==
The building was built in 1936-39 by the design of the Russian architect Serhiy Grigoriev for the headquarters of the Kyiv Special Military District. The author of the design was able organically unite elements of a classical style and Ukrainian Baroque.

First that may strike visitors it is the unbelievable thickness of building's walls. Specialists explain that it was due to restrictions to build administrative buildings in the Soviet Union of the 1930s, which forced to dodge it by building a new structure on the already existing foundation. The new design made a great use of the symmetric campuses of the previous Shile's design of the 1870s.

The new building was considered a reconstruction with some new elements. Its wings were extended, while in the center was formed a special composition — massive risalit with an inserted colonnade of the great Corinthian order. The governing monumentality of the building is underlined by a heavy entablature along with a glazed stylobate of a polished grey tint labradorite ("under coat"). The front entrance of the building is flanked by four rock spheres. The architect planned the design to such extent considering all the details that the big building regardless of being located on a narrow street not only did not squashed its surroundings, but also is well observed from all points: from the Instytutska and Lutheranska vulytsi, from the neighboring Franko Square and the remotely located Mykhailiv Square.

In its courtyard are located a dining hall, a laundry room, cleaners, a printing house etc.
