= 1 December 2013 Euromaidan protests =

2013 protests in Kyiv, Ukraine

In response to a police crackdown on Euromaidan's protesters (mostly students) in the early hours of 30 November, more than half a million Kyivans joined the protests on 1 December in order to defend the students "and to protect society in the face of crippling authoritarianism."

== 30 November attack on protesters ==
30 November Berkut assault on Maidan
- Part of the Euromaidan
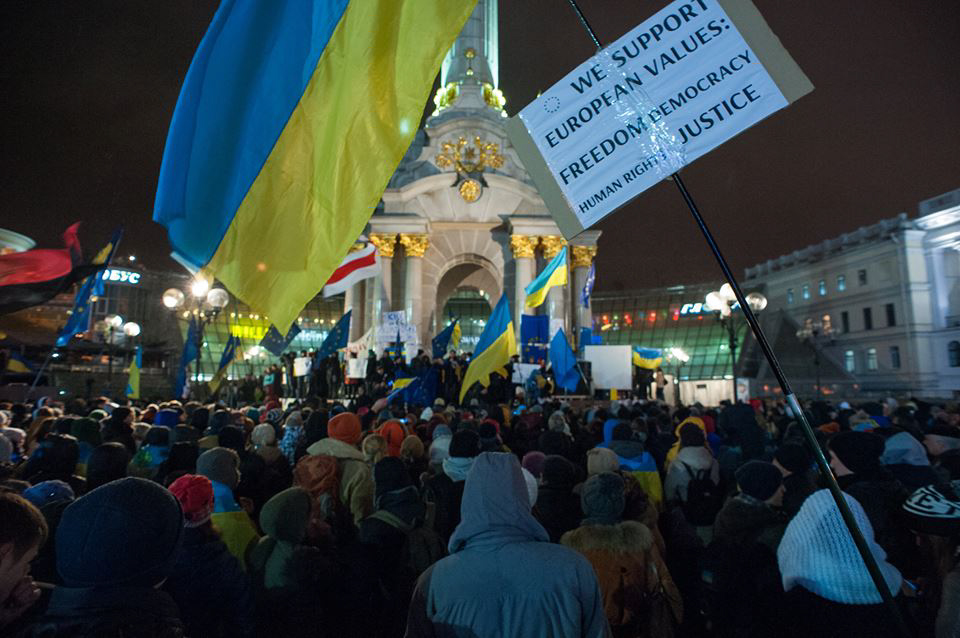
- Protesters on Maidan on 30 November
- Date: 30 November 2013
- Location: Independence Square, Kyiv, Ukraine
- Caused by: Euromaidan
- Goals: Resignation of Yanukovych: ensure unobstructed passage of vehicles for further work in preparation for New Year holidays
- Methods: Rioting, assault, civil disobedience
- Status: Finished
- Result: Scores injured

Parties
Euromaidan protesters; students; journalists	Ministry of Internal Affairs; Berkut riot police

Lead figures
	Not identified

Number
~400	~2,000

Casualties and losses
beaten up: 79 (at least); missing: 3	none

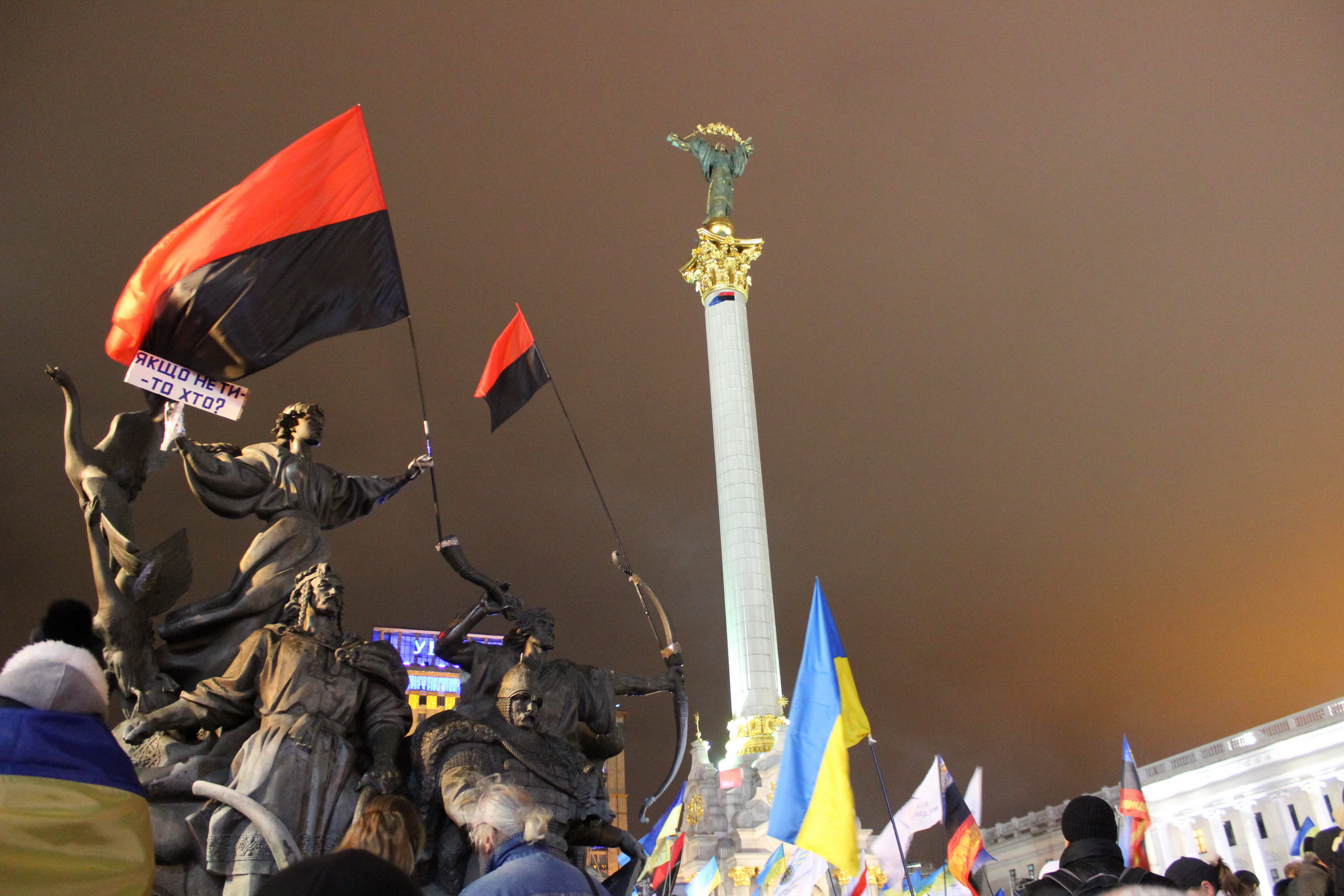
Flags of Ukraine and the Ukrainian nationalist movement flown on 29 November in Maidan Nezalezhnosti (Independence Square) before the attack

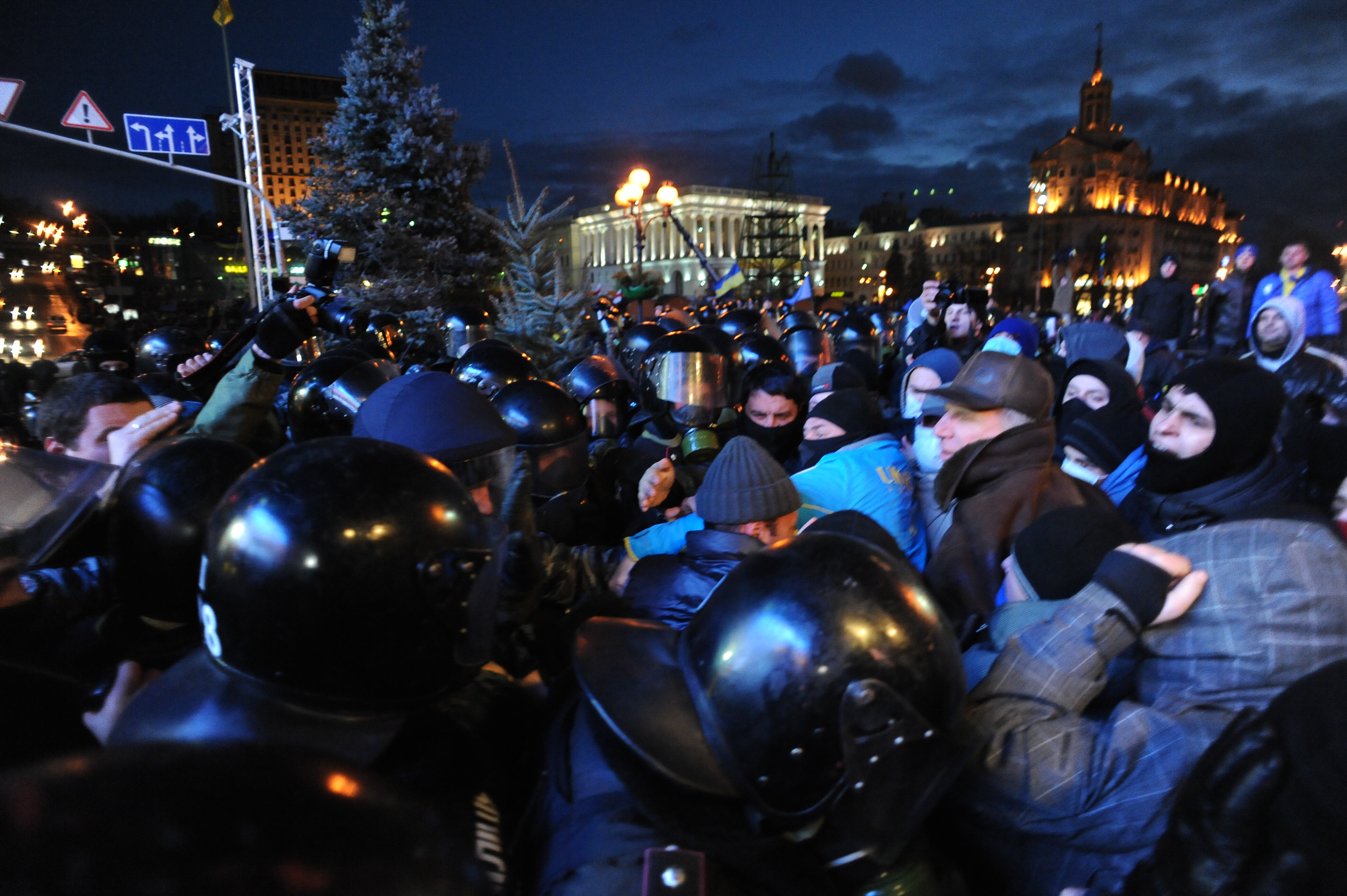
Police attacks protesters on 29 November (15:35 LST)

On 30 November 2013 at 04:00, armed with batons, stun grenades, and tear gas, Berkut special police units attacked and dispersed all protesters from Maidan Nezalezhnosti while suppressing mobile phone communications. The police attacked not only the protesters (most of whom did not or failed to put up resistance) but also other civilians in the vicinity of Maidan Nezalezhnosti, when the Berkut forces chased unarmed people several hundreds of meters and continued to beat them with batons and feet. Initially, 35 people were injured as a result of the militia raid, including a Reuters cameraman and a photographer. Other protesters were detained. Most of the protesters were students. At 09:20 Berkut besieged the St. Michael's Golden-Domed Monastery where approximately 50 Euromaidan activists, including the injured, found sanctuary. Police spokeswoman Olha Bilyk justified the police raid by saying that protesters were interfering with preparations to decorate the square for the Christmas and New Year's holidays, and accused them of throwing stones and burning logs. Minister of Internal Affairs Vitaliy Zakharchenko later apologized and claimed "riot police abused their power" and promised a thorough investigation. Via state television he added "if there are calls for mass disturbances, then we will react to this harshly".

In an official statement, Ukrainian Deputy Prosecutor General Anatoliy Pryshko confirmed that 79 people were injured during the raid, including 6 students, 4 reporters, and 2 foreigners; 10 people were hospitalized. In addition, 7 policemen were also injured.

On 30 November 2013 by 13:00 another spontaneous meeting was taking place at St. Michael's Square near the St. Michael's Monastery as Maidan Nezalezhnosti continued to be guarded by the Berkut formations. Ambassadors from some ten countries of the European Union, among which was the Ambassador of the European Union in Ukraine, Jan Tombiński, visited protesters at the meeting. According to Hromadske.TV, by 16:00 the meeting gathered some 5,000 people who were shouting "Won't forgive", and "Revolution". At St. Michael Square protesters started to form units of self-resistance. Approximately 10,000 protesters remained in the evening of the 30th, with an estimated 10,000 more from Lviv travelling to Kyiv on Saturday night.

On 30 November opposition parties Batkivshchyna, UDAR and Svoboda set up "Headquarters of National Resistance" throughout Ukraine.

== 1 December protests ==
2013 Bankova Street protests
- Part of the Euromaidan
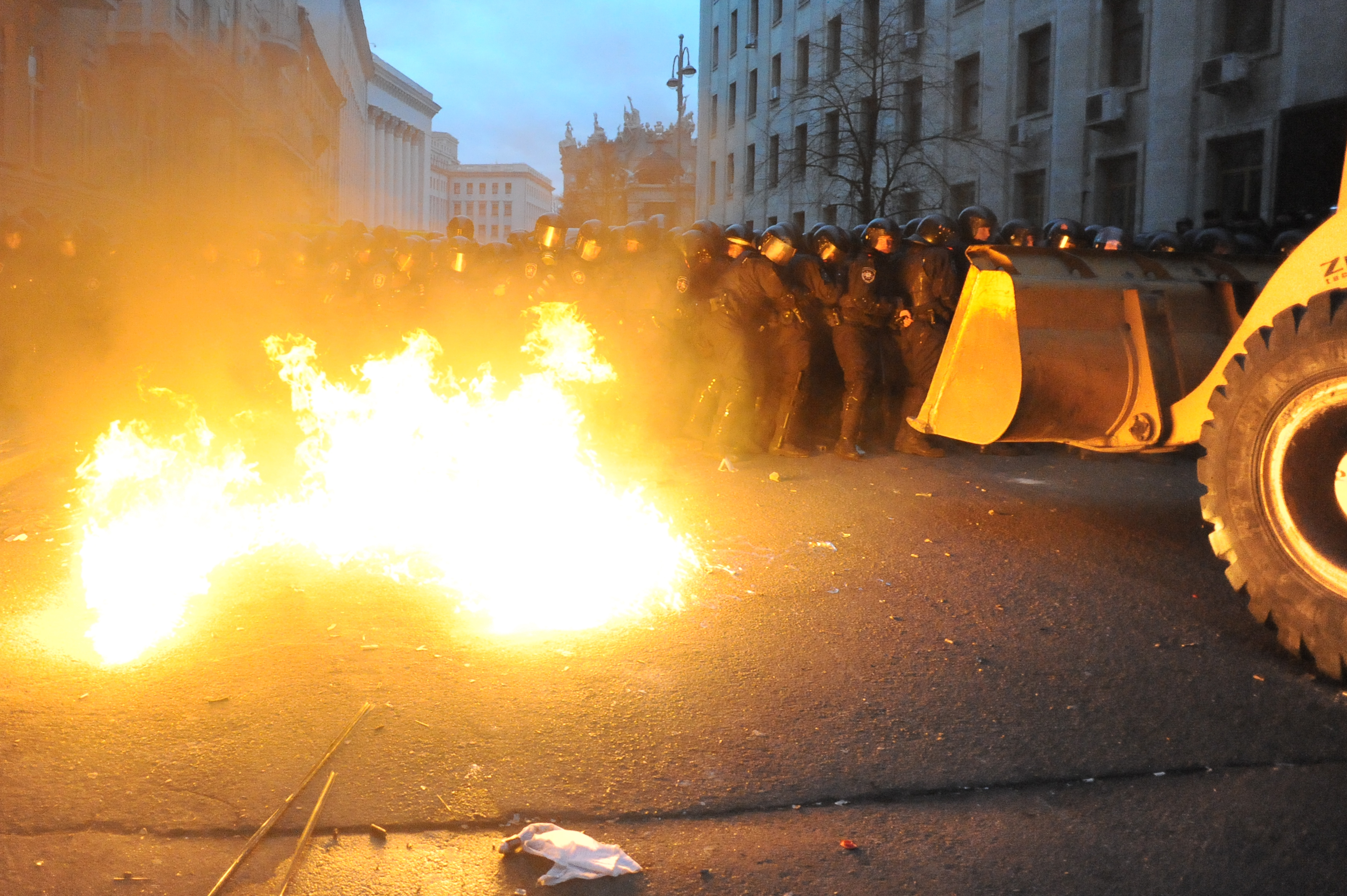
- Tractor assault on Bankova
- Date: 1 December 2013
- Location: Bankova Street, Kyiv, Ukraine
- Caused by: Violent disperse of peaceful protesters on 30 November
- Goals: Unknown
- Result: The Lenin Monument in Kyiv destroyed a week after the protests.

Parties
Euromaidan protesters; journalists	Bratstvo	Ministry of Internal Affairs; Berkut riot police; Interior Troops of Ukraine; Titushky

Lead figures
		Vitaliy Zakharchenko (Minister of Internal Affairs)

Casualties and losses
Attacked: 40+ (journalists)		Hospitalized: 50

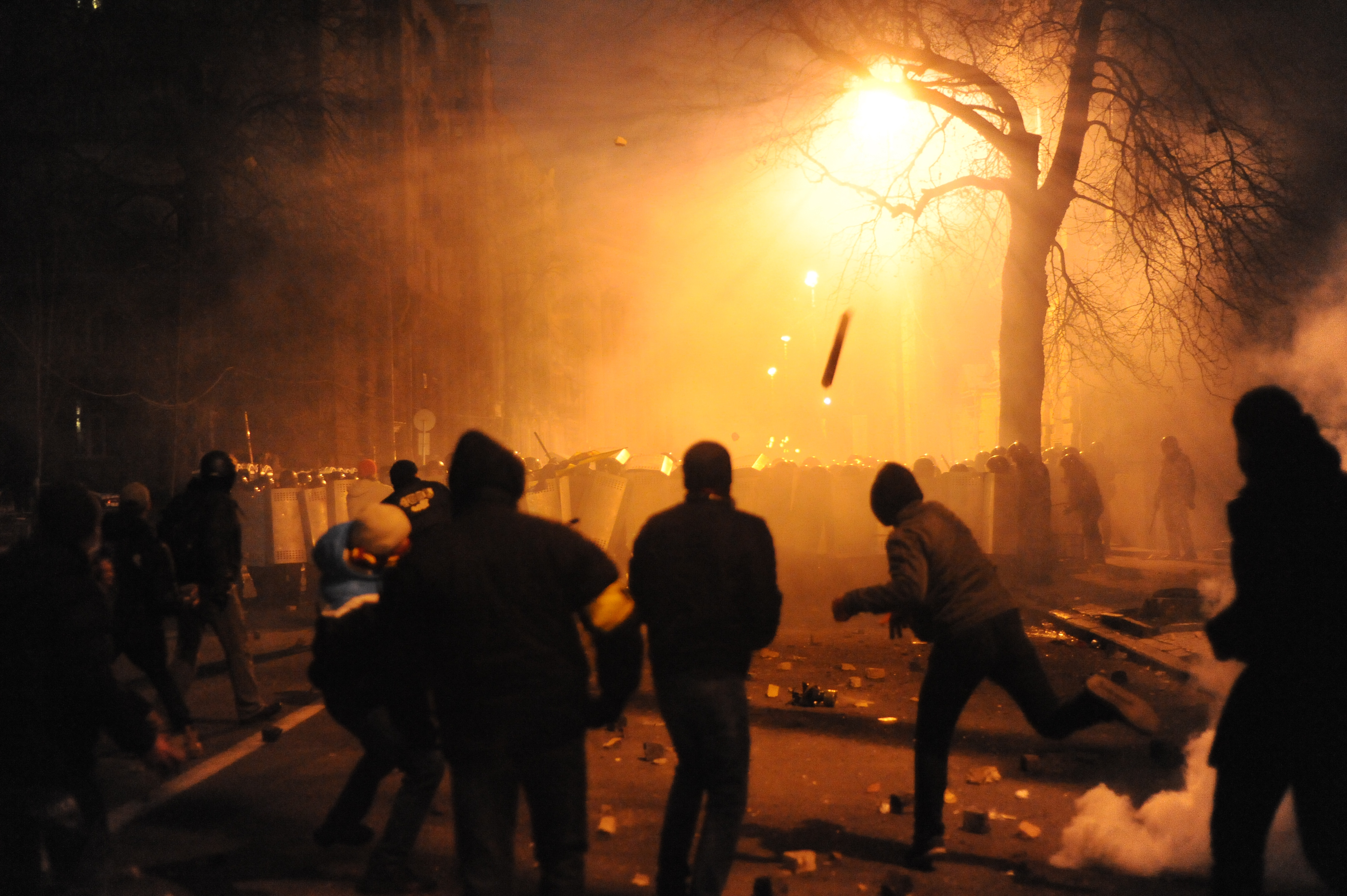
Violent clashes erupt between protesters and police

On 1 December, Kyiv's District Administrative Court banned further protests in downtown Kyiv at both Maidan Nezalezhnosti and European Square, as well as in front of the Presidential Administration and Interior Ministry buildings, until 7 January 2014. Opposition forces planned the rally on the 1st to take place at St. Michael's Square, which is not among the banned rally locations, with a march towards Maidan Nezalezhnosti. During 1 December rally, protesters followed through and defied the ban and marched from St. Michael's Square to re-take Maidan Nezalezhnosti. Protesters broke several windows in the city council building, followed by crowds spilling out of Maidan Nezalezhnosti to the Presidential Administration building at Bankova Street and the Cabinet building (Hrushevskoho Street). People chanted "Out with the thugs" and sang the Ukrainian anthem. The opposition party Batkivshchyna claimed as much as 500,000 protesters turned out for the rallies, and opposition leader Petro Poroshenko claimed 350,000 were on Maidan Nezalezhnosti. Other news agencies reported over 100,000 in Maidan Nezalezhnosti alone, and the total number of protesters to be from 400,000 to 800,000. One poll had 70% of the surge in protesters attributable to the violence of 30 November.

At around 14:00, a group of protesters commandeered a bulldozer (LongGong CDM 833) from Maidan Nezalezhnosti and attempted to pull down the fence surrounding the Presidential Administration building. People threw bricks at Internal Troops guards. At least three people were injured outside of the presidential administration building, receiving head injuries from flying debris. AFP reporters saw security forces outside the Presidential Administration building fire dozens of stun grenades and smoke bombs at masked demonstrators who were pelting police with stones and Molotov cocktails. The opposition stated that the aforementioned confrontations with police forces were organized by provocateurs and that the opposition has nothing to do with the conflict at Bankova street. They confirmed that the protests of opposition are peaceful. Number of activists including People's Deputy of Ukraine Petro Poroshenko attempted to stop the tractor.

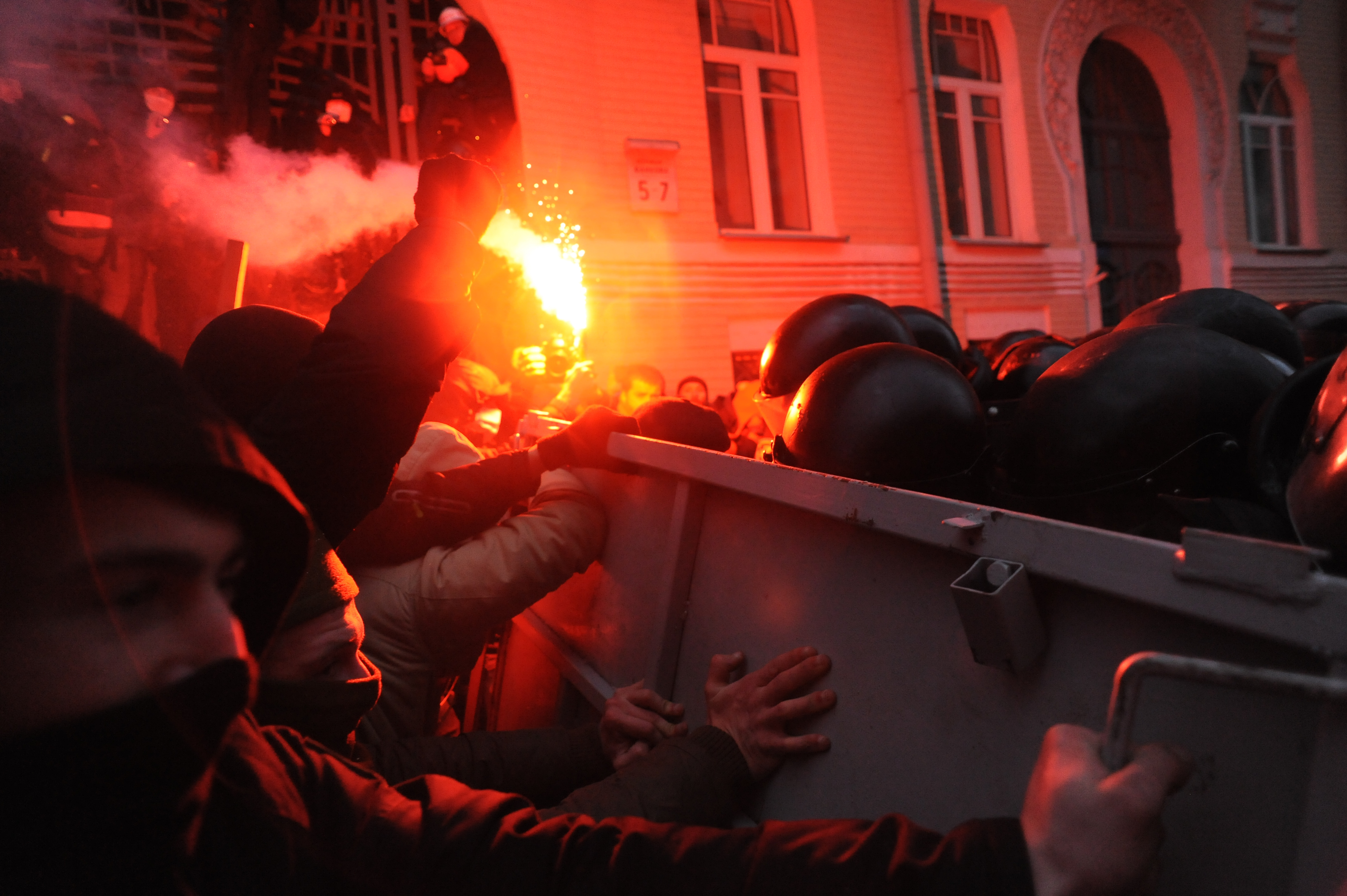
Soldiers of Ukraine's Internal Troops in riot gear and protesters clash at Bankova str, Kyiv, Ukraine. 1 December 2013.

Radio Stolytsia reported that Berkut riot police stopped a motorcade of protesters from heading towards the presidential mansion in Mezhyhirya, a suburb north of Kyiv.

The Ukrainian Interior Ministry reported that more than 300 members of the radical Bratstvo (Brotherhood) organization were involved in unlawful actions committed outside the Presidential Administration building, who acted under the direction of its leader, Dmytro Korchynsky.

The opposition occupied the Kyiv City Council (City Hall) and the Trade Unions' Building. They still remain under control of the protesters. At the city council building, protesters broke windows to get inside the building and occupy it. They chanted "Kyiv is ours" and hung a Ukrainian flag in a window. The city police warned the protesters in City Hall that they will "undertake measures" to clear the building if they do not leave it, without specifying. "The capital's police warns that in case of non-compliance with the lawful demands, the law enforcers will undertake corresponding measures to free the building from violators of law."

Secretary of the Writer's Union of Ukraine Serhiy Pantiuk took a dozen women to shelter inside the Union building. After other protesters fleeing Berkut police took refuge in the building as well, police broke in though the rear windows and started beating everyone in the building, including women, journalists, and building security. There were up to 50 people hiding inside.

The official websites of Ukraine's presidential administration and interior ministry that controls more than 300,000 law enforcement personnel had been down for most of the day. Local media reports claim that hackers are the cause, although no group has taken responsibility for it.

At 20:00, an angry crowd of thousands attacked Berkut riot units who were guarding the statue of Vladimir Lenin. The crowd attacked with rocks, ladders, and other objects, while troops responded by deploying tear gas and making random attacks at the crowd. At least one Berkut member was heavily injured and the troops were forced to flee on a bus once overtaken by the crowd.

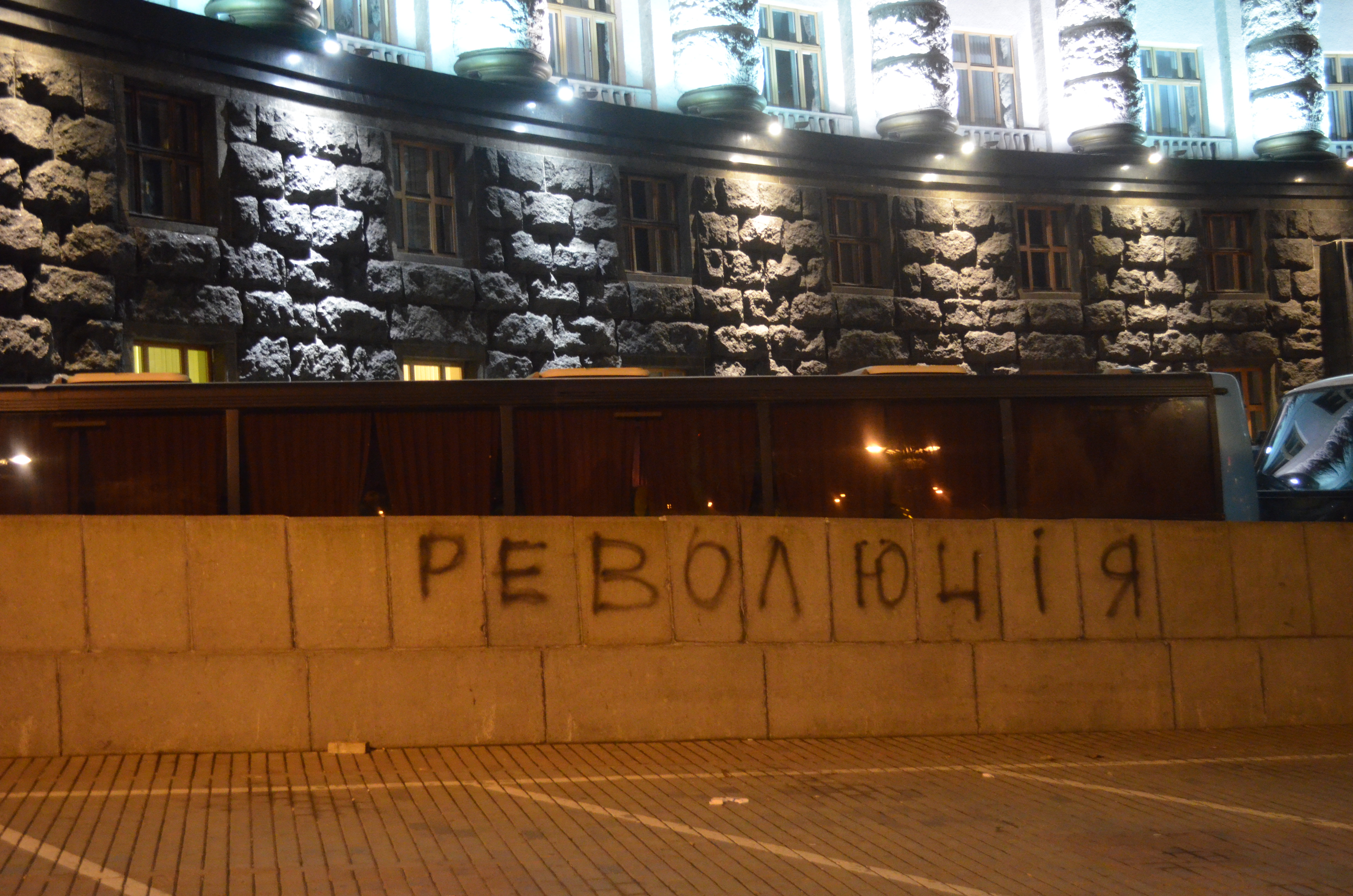
Graffiti inscription "Revolution" ("Революція")

The opposition announced a national strike and launched construction of a tent city on Maidan Nezalezhnosti. Writer Irena Karpa also encouraged the nation to go on general strike – to skip work, boycott Russian products and continue the protests. Opposition leaders stated that Yanukovych is planning on declaring a state of emergency on 2 December. Klitschko denounced the attempt to storm the president's office as an effort to provoke the government into declaring a state of emergency. He called for everyone to stay on the square in a peaceful protest. He later called for the president's resignation, stating "They stole the dream. If this government does not want to fulfill the will of the people, then there will be no such government, there will be no such president. There will be a new government and a new president," he said to cheering crowds. Meanwhile, Svoboda leader Oleh Tyahnybok called for a national strike and in an official release called for a "social and national revolution," saying a revolution has started in Ukraine. Opposition leader Yuriy Lutsenko also called for a revolution to take place, saying "Our plan is clear: this is not a rally, not an action. This – is a revolution," and called to complete the revolutions which took place in 1991 and 2004.

== Injuries ==
Five riot police sustained bodily injuries and three have been chemically poisoned from an unknown gas, Ukrainska Pravda reports. As of 4 p.m. 22 people had been injured and sought medical attention in emergency rooms in clashes during the demonstrations in Kyiv, according to the health department of the Kyiv City State Administration. In most cases, those injured were treated for chemical burns of the eyes and bodily injuries, according to Interfax-Ukraine. Kyiv police spokeswoman Olha Bilyk said by telephone that around 100 officers were wounded in the clashes. A mayor's office official said nearly 50 demonstrators had also been treated by doctors for various injuries. Kyiv Post reported on eyewitness accounts of the demonstrations that suggest that there might have been hundreds of protesters injured. According to the Department of Health, by the end of the second day of clashes, 109 protesters were hospitalized with 165 injured in total.

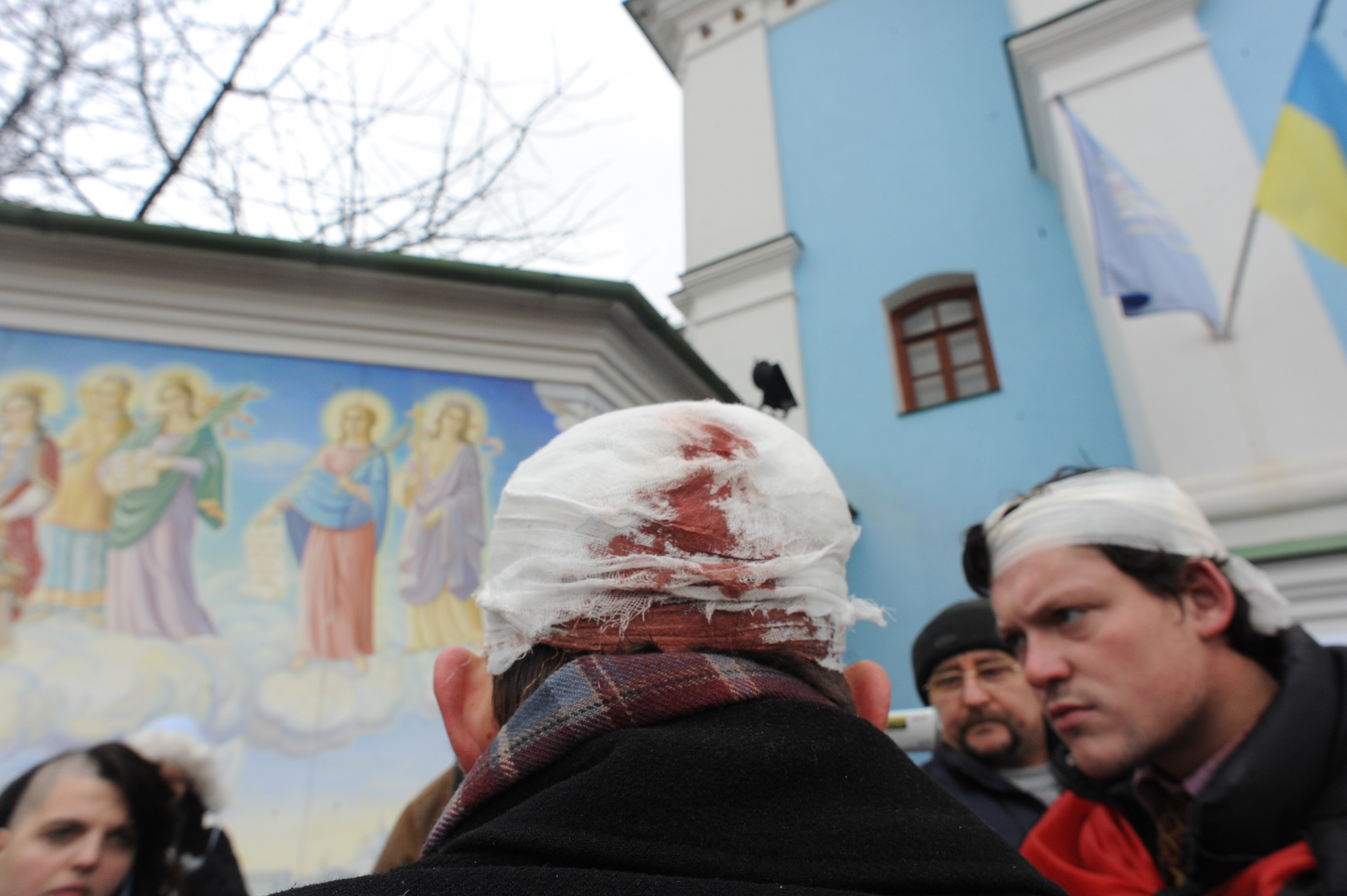
Injured protesters seen after violent assault on Maidan Nezalezhnosti, Kyiv, 30 November.

Telekrytyka, a media watchdog compiled a list of over 40 injured journalists and photographers, with many report said they were deliberately beaten by the riot police while displaying their journalist IDs. The New York Times, Ukrainska Pravda, and Agence France-Presse photographers were among at least 30 journalists injured in clashes with police. One journalist was hit with an explosive device during clashes with Berkut on Bankova Street, and New York Times photographer Joseph Sywenkyj was injured when a piece of a sound grenade struck him in the face. A photographer from The Insider notified police that he was a journalist, but was assaulted along with his cameraman anyway. Euronews' cameraman Roman Kupriyanov was also beaten by riot police. Euronews reported (on 1 December) "He was one of several media personnel who claim to have been deliberately targeted by the riot police". Dmytro Volkov, of 1+1 reported police were aiming at journalists' equipment. Photographer Serhiy Supinskiy was attacked by a riot police officer on Bankova Street, he said. The officer deliberately hit his photography equipment, and destroyed his flash and lens.

== See also ==
- Fall of the monument to Lenin in Kyiv
- Dmytro Korchynskyy
- Tetiana Chornovol
