= Liuteranska Street =

Street in central Kyiv, Ukraine

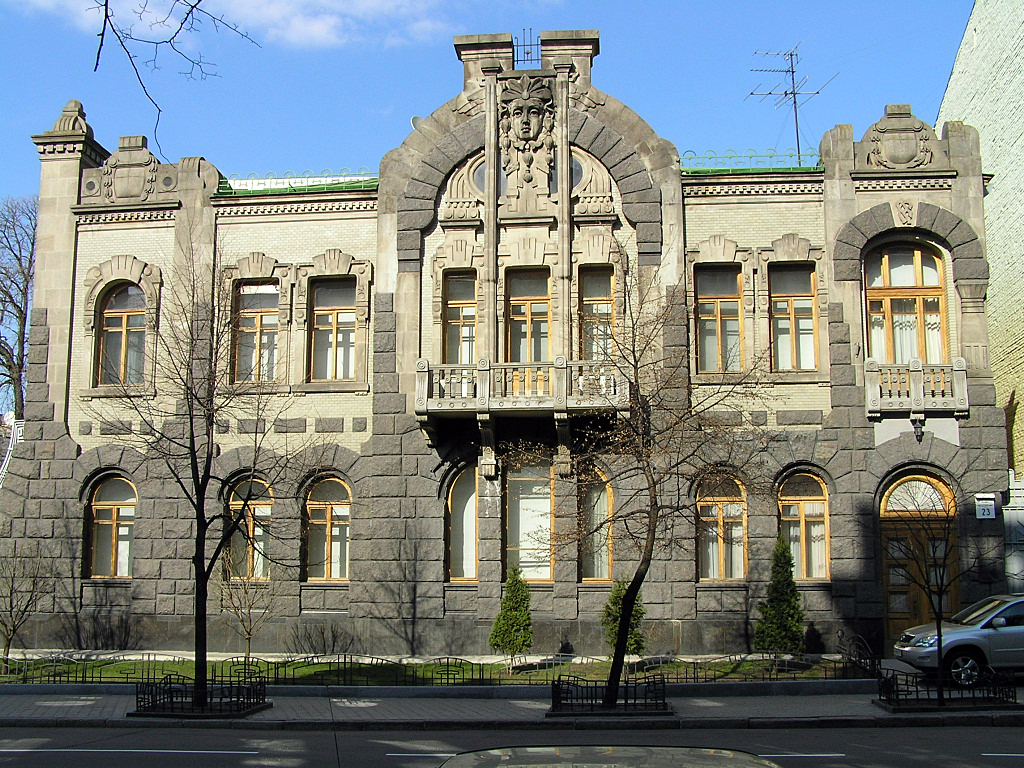
- House of the Weeping Widow (23 Liuteranska).
- Native name: Вулиця Лютеранська (Ukrainian)
- Former names: Grafskaya, Lyuteranskaya, Annenkovskaya, Engels
- Length: 700 m (2,300 ft)
- Addresses: 23 (House of the Weeping Widow); 22 (Lutheran Kirchen); 16 Sulymivka
- Location: Central Kyiv, Ukraine

Liuteranska Street (Ukrainian: Вулиця Лютеранська, lit. 'Lutheran Street') is a street located in the Lypky neighborhood of the Pecherskyi District in central Kyiv, the capital of Ukraine. One of the most distinguishing features are the House of the Weeping Widow and the Lutheran Church of Saint Catherine.

The street stretches for about half of a mile between Khreshchatyk and Shovkovychna Street. Among other streets that connect to Liuteranska Street are Bankova Street, Zankovetska Street, and Kruhlouniversytetska Street.

== History ==
The street is believed to have originated sometime at the beginning of the 19th century under the name of Grafskaya. In 1812 the street changed its name to Lyuteranskaya (or Liuteranska in Ukrainian) as the German Lutheran congregation built its new church here in 1857. In 1865 the street again changed its name to Annenkovskaya after Nicholas Annenkov, the Governor-General of Kyiv. Nonetheless, the name Liuteranska was still used by the residents of the street and the adjacent to it. With the installation of Soviet power in the city, the street was renamed after Friedrich Engels. During World War II the street was called Luther Strasse (1941–1943). Once Ukraine finally obtained its independence the street was returned to its original name, even though most of the German population was deported from the area right after World War II.

== Addresses ==
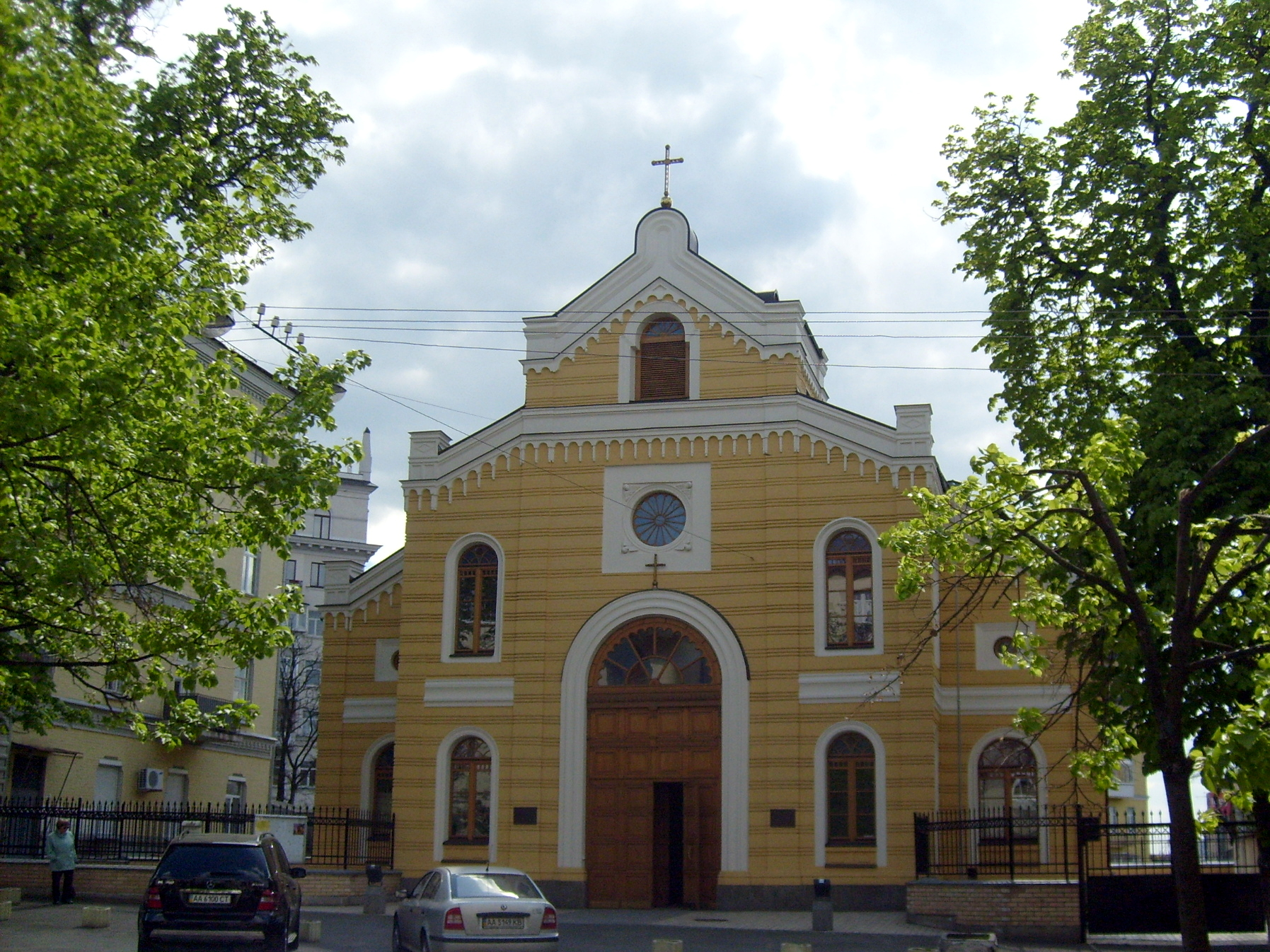
Lutheran Church St. Catherine

- Nos 6-8, designed by architect Martin Klug. The building has an intriguing design while being decorated with numerous columns and painted in red. The interesting also is the fact that in 1914 here resided such personalities as an actress of theater Maria Andreyeva and a Russian writer Aleksei Peshkov (Maxim Gorkiy).
- No.15 was designed and built by Oleksandr Verbytsky who continued to live here until the World War II. During those times the building was destroyed but later restored in 1948.
- No.16, locally known as Sulymivka.
- No.22, the Lutheran Church of Saint Catherine (architects: Johann Waldemar Strom and Paul Johann Schleifer). After 1938 it was reformed into the Club of Fighting Atheists, later as fuel storage for the Ministry of Culture and from 1972 on it was used as directorate and storage for the Museum for Rural Architecture and Traditional Customs. It was returned to the Lutheran Church only in 1998.
- No.23, better known as the House of the Weeping Widow, the building was the mansion of Sergei Arshavskiy who was the member of the First Guild in Kyiv. The building is a secondary Presidential residence and is located in close proximity to Bankova Street.
