= Bankova Street =

Street in Kyiv, Ukraine

Vulytsia Bankova
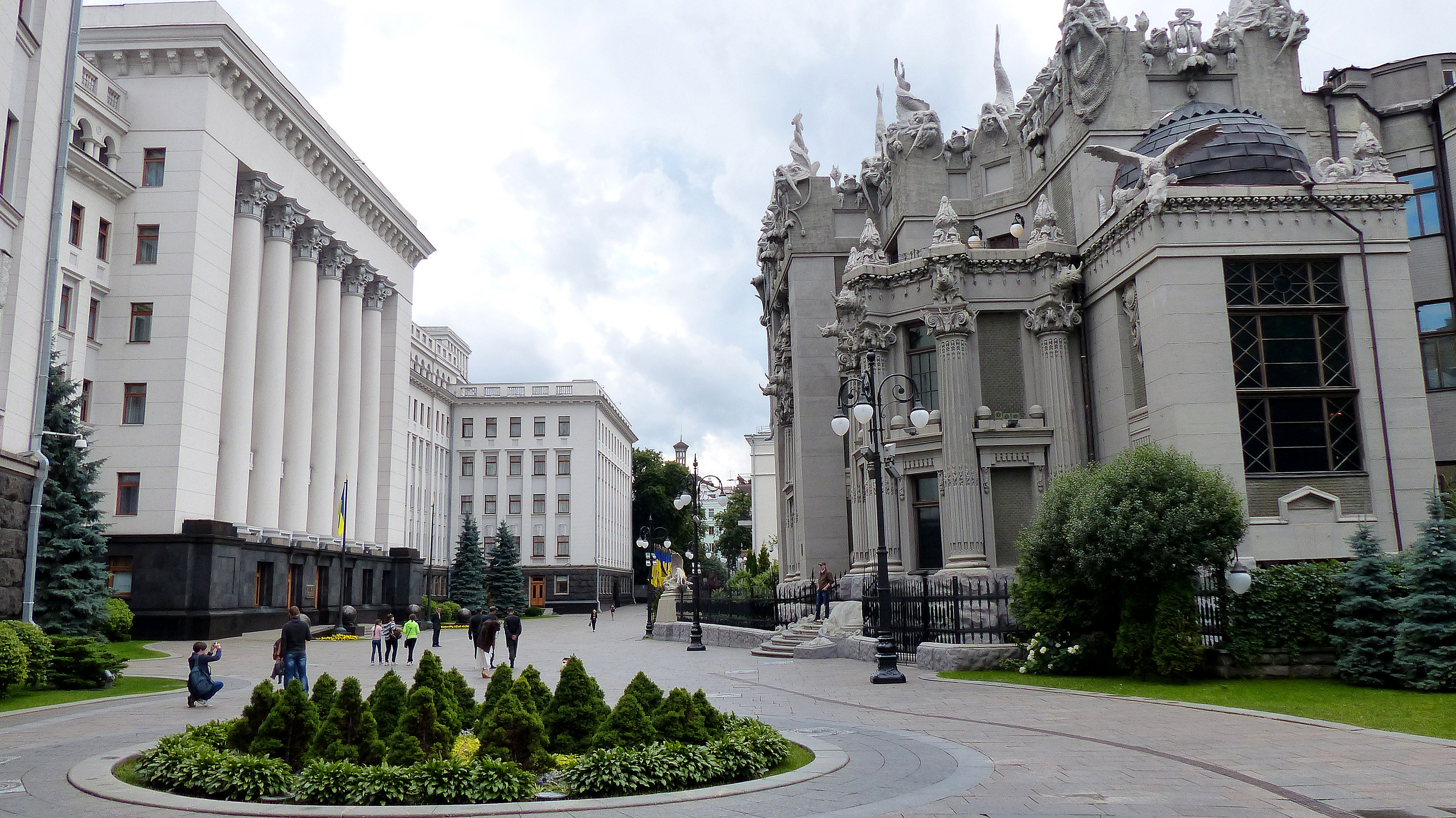
- The Presidential Office (left) and the House with Chimaeras official residence (right).
- Native name: Вулиця Банкова (Ukrainian)
- Former names: Tsaredarska, Trepovska, Komunistychna, Ordzhonikidze
- Length: 450 m (1,480 ft)
- Addresses: 2 (Liebermann's mansion); 9-11 (President's Administration); 10 House with Chimaeras
- Location: Pechersk Raion, Kyiv, Ukraine
- South end: Kruhlouniversytetska Street
- South end: Instytutska Street

Bankova Street (Ukrainian: вулиця Банкова, romanized: vulytsia Bankova, IPA: [ˈwulɪtsʲɐ ˈbɑnkowɐ]) is a street in central Kyiv, the capital of Ukraine, located in the Lypky neighborhood of the Pechersk District. Most of the street is pedestrianised and closed-off, as it houses the Presidential Office of Ukraine and various official residences, notably the House with Chimaeras.

== History ==
Bankova Street was first constructed during the 1870s on the estate of Governor-General F. Trepov. During its history, the street was named Tsaredarska, Trepovska (in honor of G.G. Trepov), Bankova, Komynistychna (from 1919-1938), and Ordzhonikidze (1938-1992). During World War II it was named under the German occupation as Bismarck-Strasse. The street was renamed once again to its historic name, "Bankova," in 1992. The present name comes from the 1840 building of the Kyiv Office of the State Bank, hence "Bank Street". Today the bank is located at 7 Instytutska Street.

The street runs between Instytutska Street and Kruhlouniversitetska Street passing Lyuteranska Street. At No.2 was the mansion of the sugar magnate Simkha Liebermann, now is the headquarters of the Ukrainian Writers' Union, originally built in 1879 and redesigned for Liebermann in 1898 by the architect Vladimir Nikolayev. At No's 9 and 11 there is located the Presidential Administration of Ukraine and No.10 is the House with Chimaeras.

A segment between Luteranska and Kruhlouniversitetska streets has a one way towards Kruhlouniversitetska.

== Infrastructure ==
From 1905 to around 1946, a tram line (at various times No.7 and 18, respectively) ran through the street, connecting the Bessarabska Square near Khreshchatyk and Hrushevsky Street.

The southern portion close to Lutheran Street has limited access and is fenced off with checkpoints around the Presidential administration. There are stairs that lead to a small park that is the backyard of House with Chimaeras. The park is at a lower grade compared to Bank Street, but on the same grade as a park of the Franko Drama Theater. The area belongs to the Kyivenerho where is located the headquarters of the company in a building of the former 8th Kyiv Gymnasium.

There is information that underneath the Presidential administration building and buildings of the parliamentary committees exists a system of underground passages.

== Addresses ==
- 1/10
- 2 Lieberman House, built 1898
- 3
- 5-7 Building of parliamentary committees
- 6-8 Building of parliamentary committees
- 10 House with Chimaeras, built 1901-03 for Władysław Horodecki, now a presidential residence and a headquarters of State Protocol and Ceremonials
- 11 Presidential Administration building, built 1930s
- 12

== Gallery ==
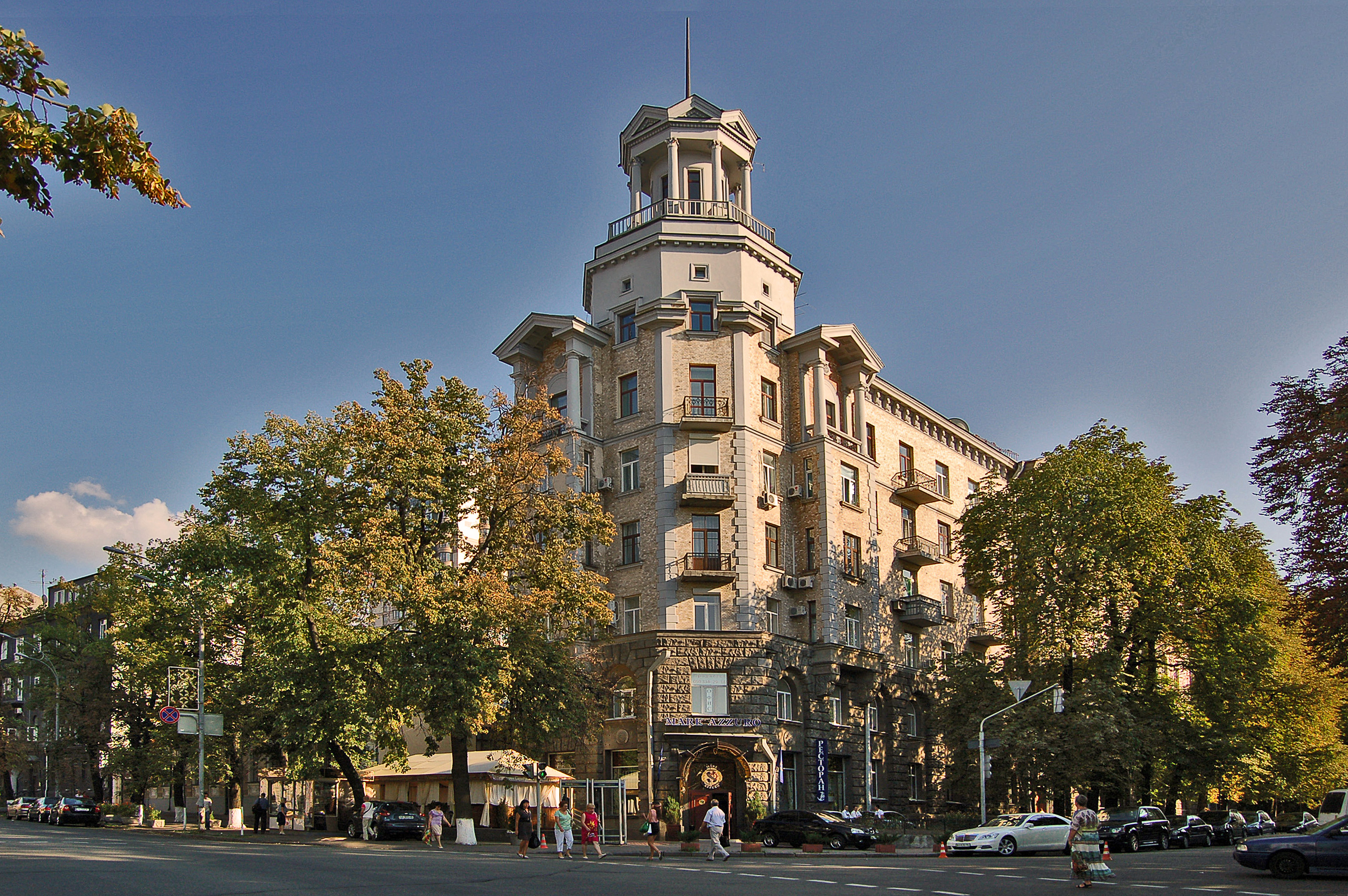
1/10 Bank Street (at Institute Street)

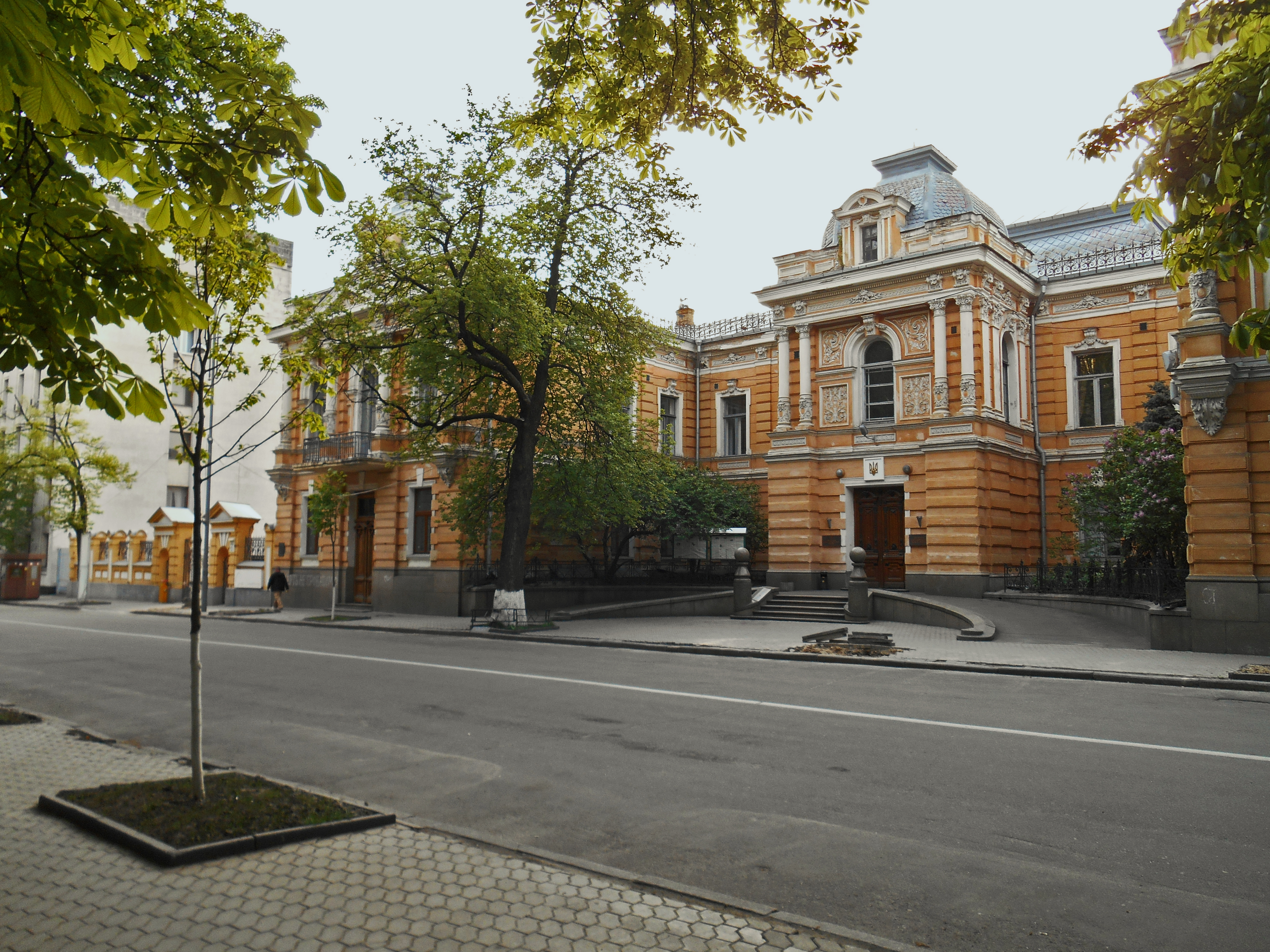
2 Bank Street

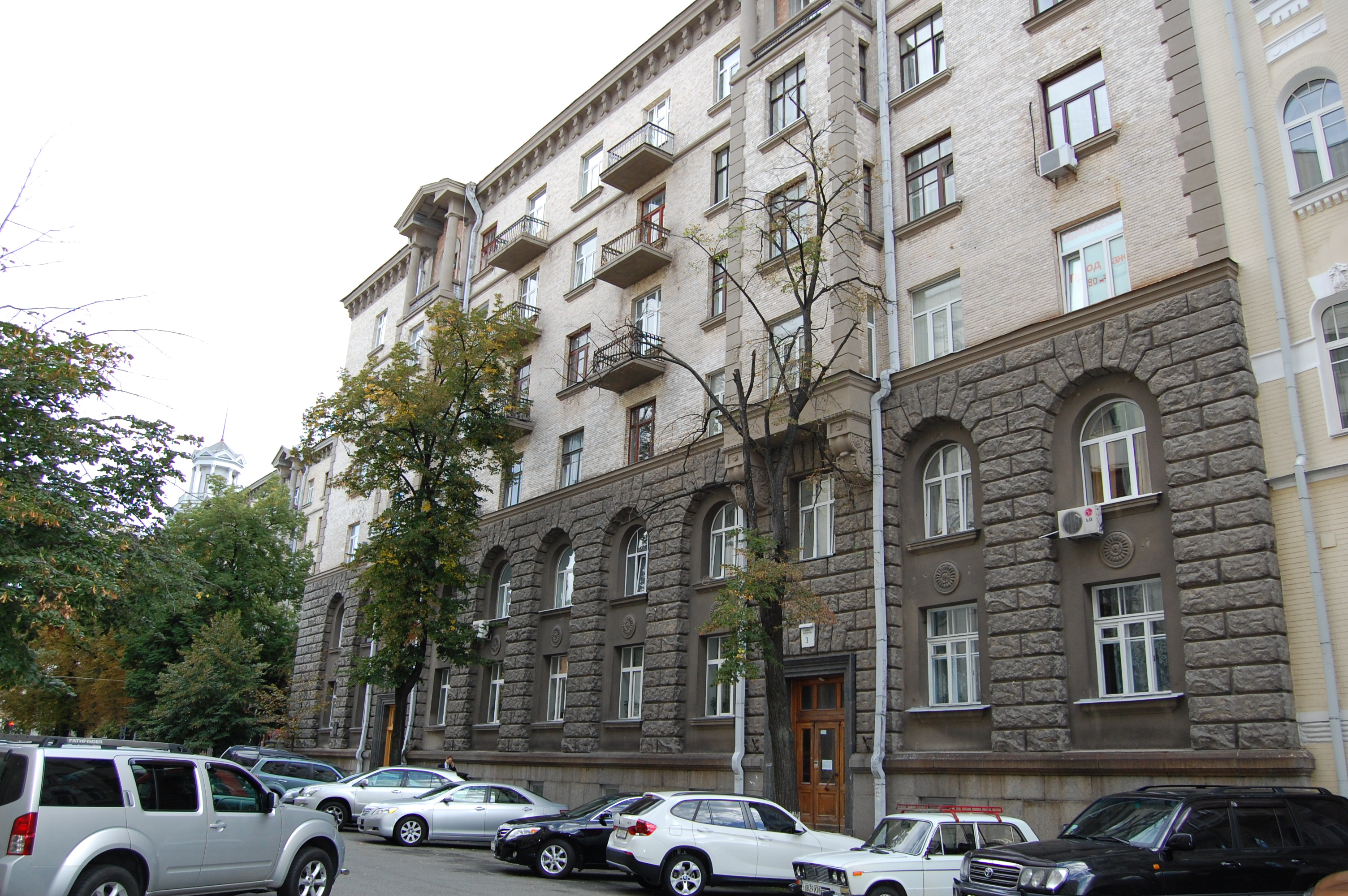
3 Bank Street

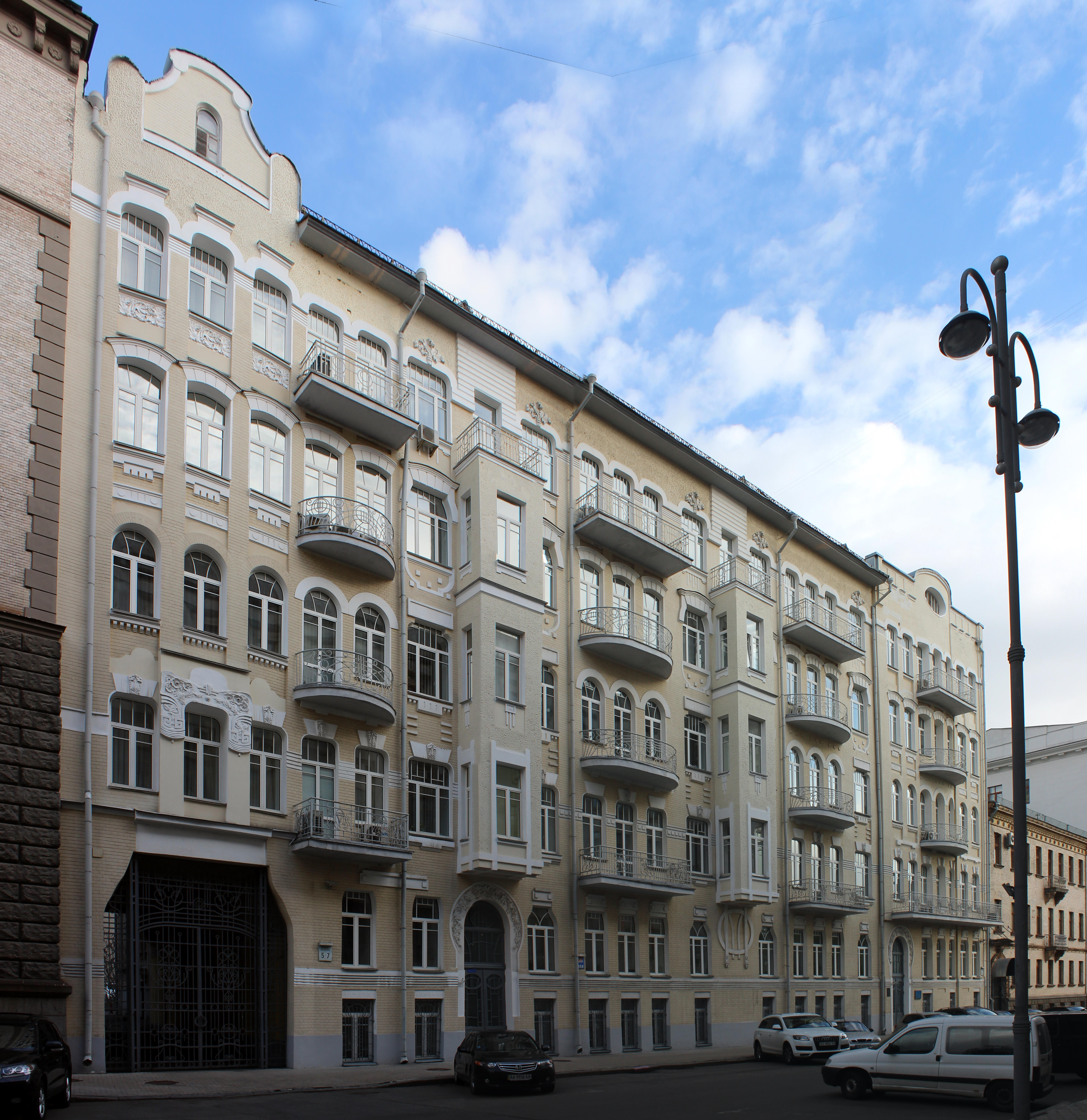
5-7 Bank Street

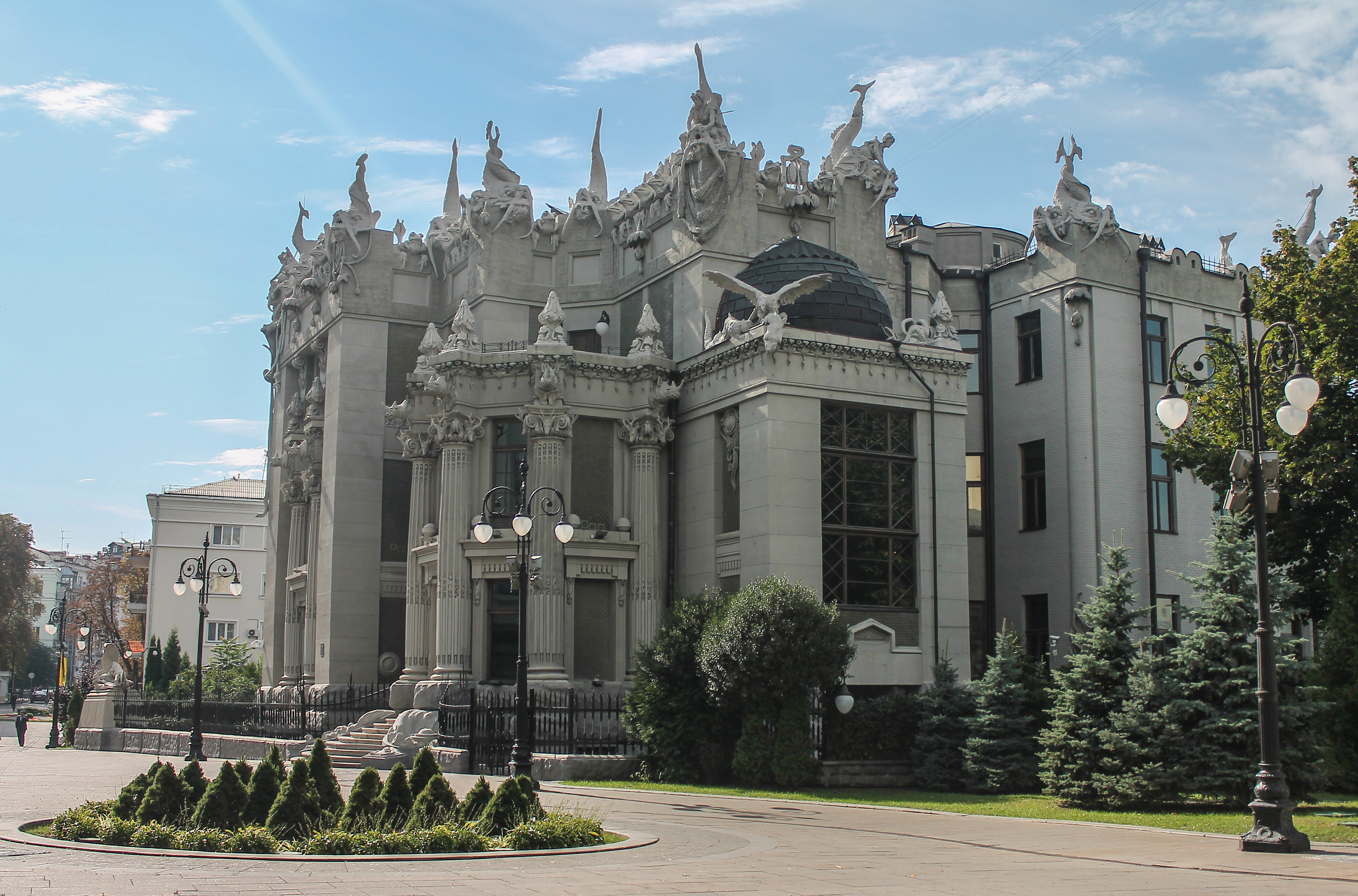
10 Bank Street

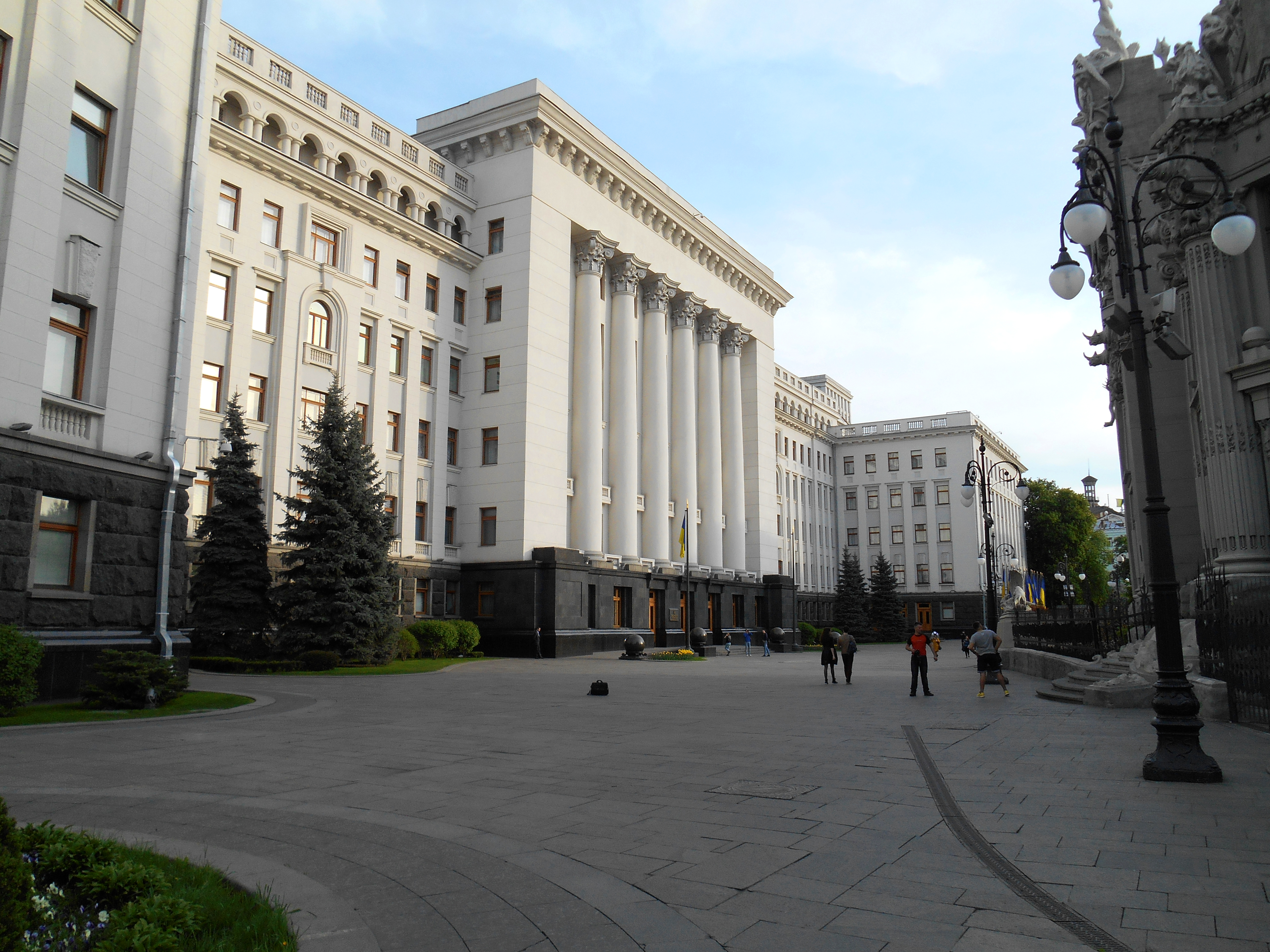
11 Bank Street

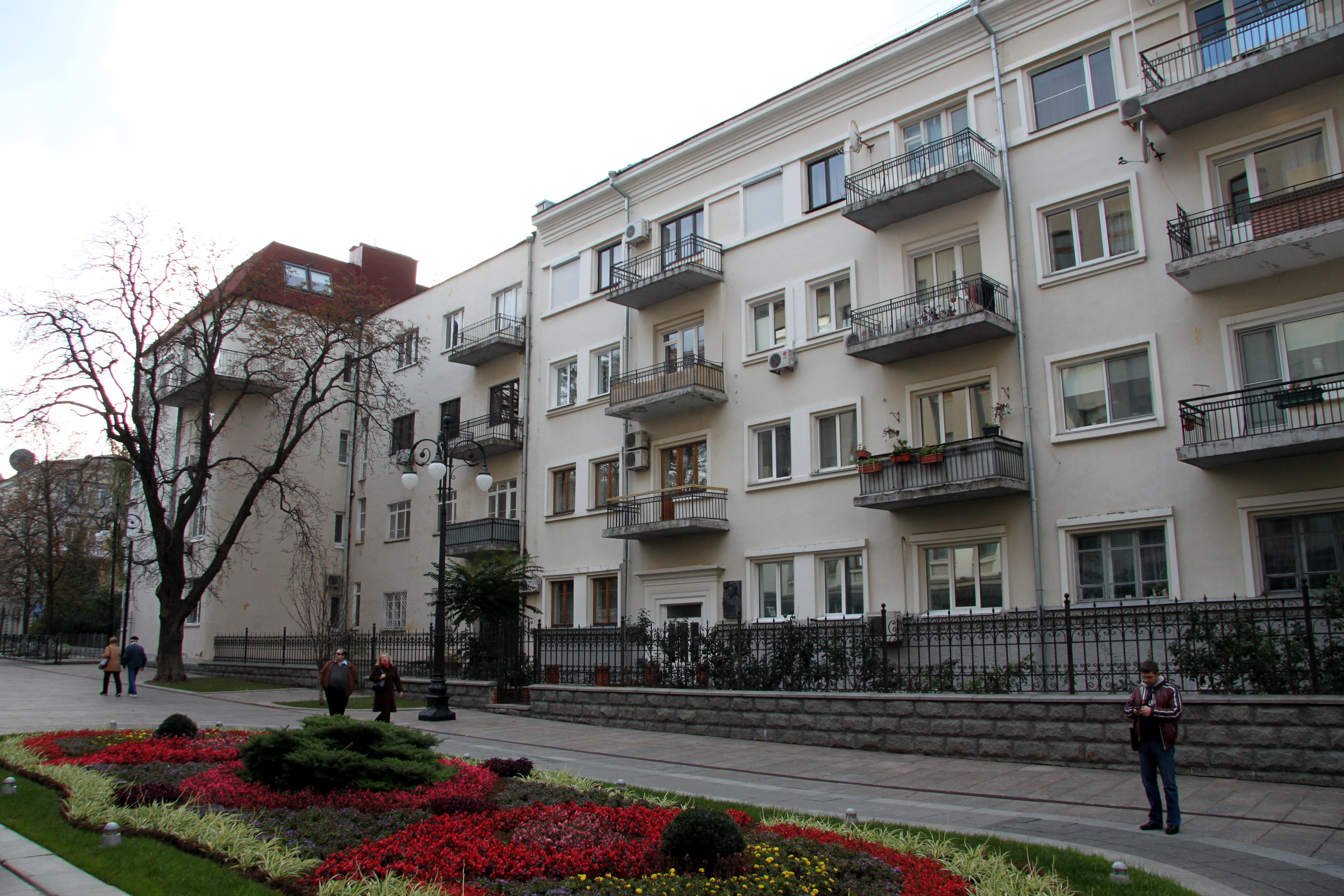
12 Bank Street

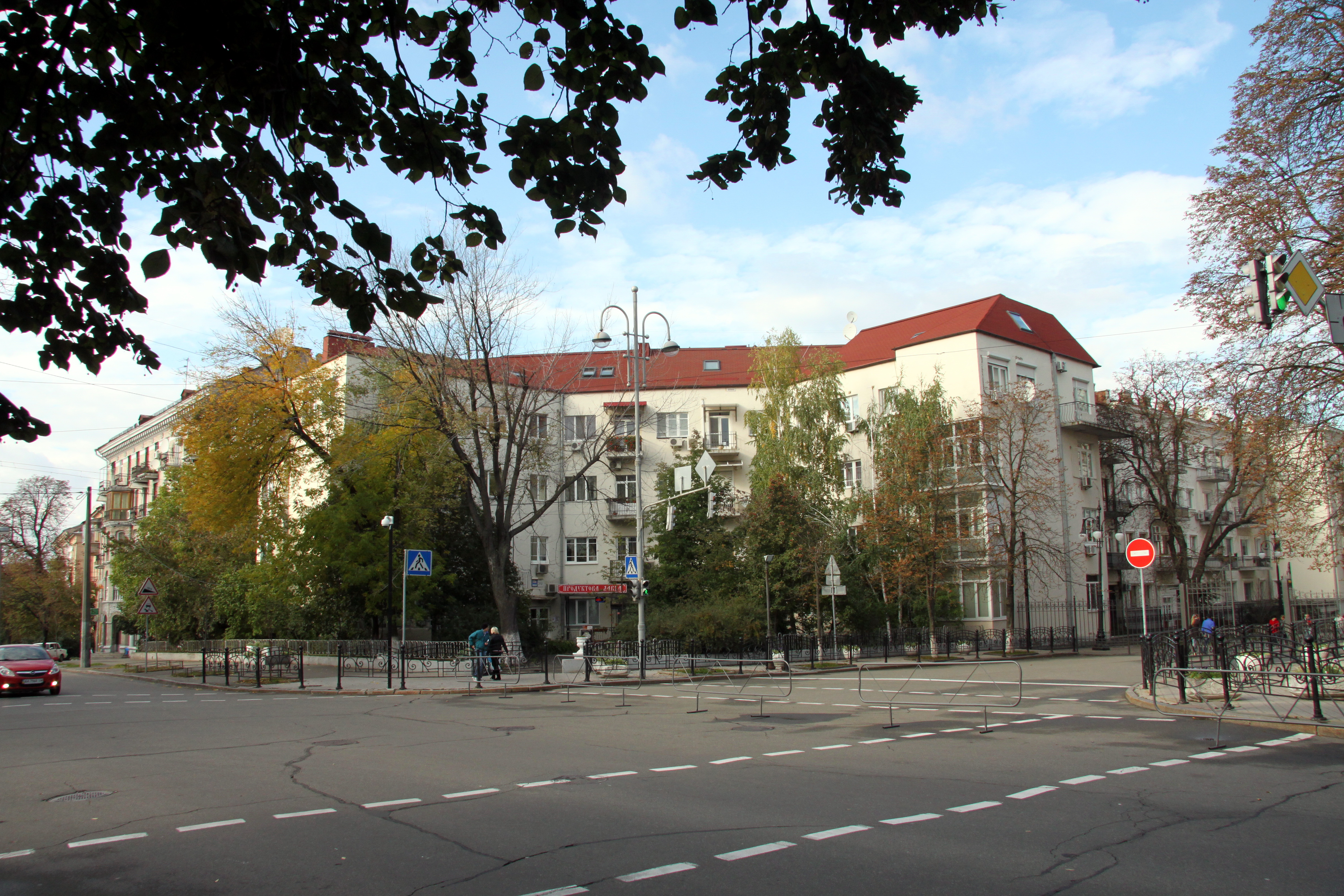
21/12 Lutheran Street

== See also ==
- 1 December 2013 Euromaidan riots
