= House of the Weeping Widow =

- Дім невтішної вдови
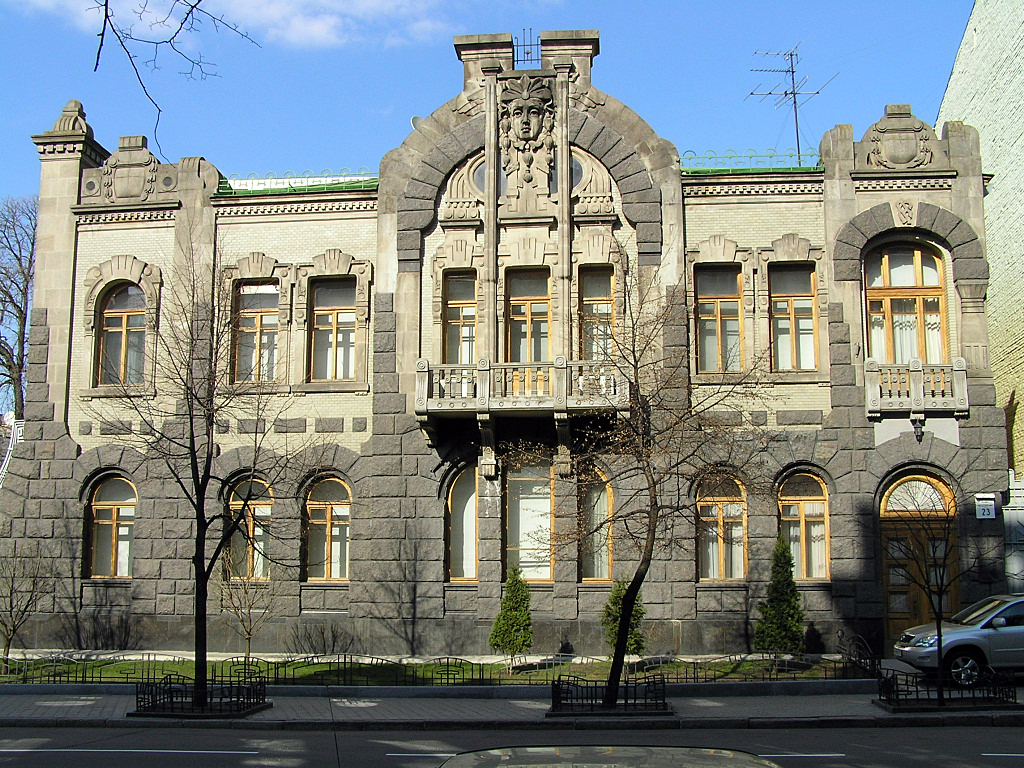
- The front façade of the House of the Weeping Widow.
- Interactive map of the House of the Weeping Widow area
- Alternative names: Serhiy Arshavskyi Building

General information
- Architectural style: Art Nouveau
- Location: Kyiv, Ukraine
- Coordinates: 50°26′37″N 30°31′40″E
- Construction started: 1907
- Completed: 1907

Design and construction
- Architect: Eduard Bradtman

Immovable Monument of Local Significance of Ukraine
- Official name: Особняк (Manor)
- Type: Urban Planning, Architecture
- Reference no.: 3337-Кв

The House of the Weeping Widow (Ukrainian: Дім невтішної вдови, Дім вдови, що плаче, romanized: Dim nevtishnoi vdovy, Dim vdovy, shcho plache) is an architectural landmark in the city of Kyiv, capital of Ukraine, located at 23 Liuteranska Street.

== History ==
Constructed in 1907 in the early Art Nouveau style by architect Eduard Bradtman, it was commissioned by Serhiy Arshavsky, a wealthy merchant from Poltava, who occupied it before the Bolshevik Revolution. The building kept its first owner's name long afterward, and even today is sometimes referred to as the Serhiy Arshavskyi Building. Following the revolution it was occupied by the International Group Federation of the Central Committee of Russian Communist Party (Bolshevik).

Currently it is one of the President of Ukraine's official residences, used to house state visitors, among them: U.S. Secretaries of State Madeleine Albright and Condoleezza Rice, and the Presidents of Lithuania and Brazil.

The building earned its nickname because when it rains water pours over the woman's face on the facade, running down her cheeks like tears.
