= Nova Zabudova =

Historical neighbourhood in Kyiv

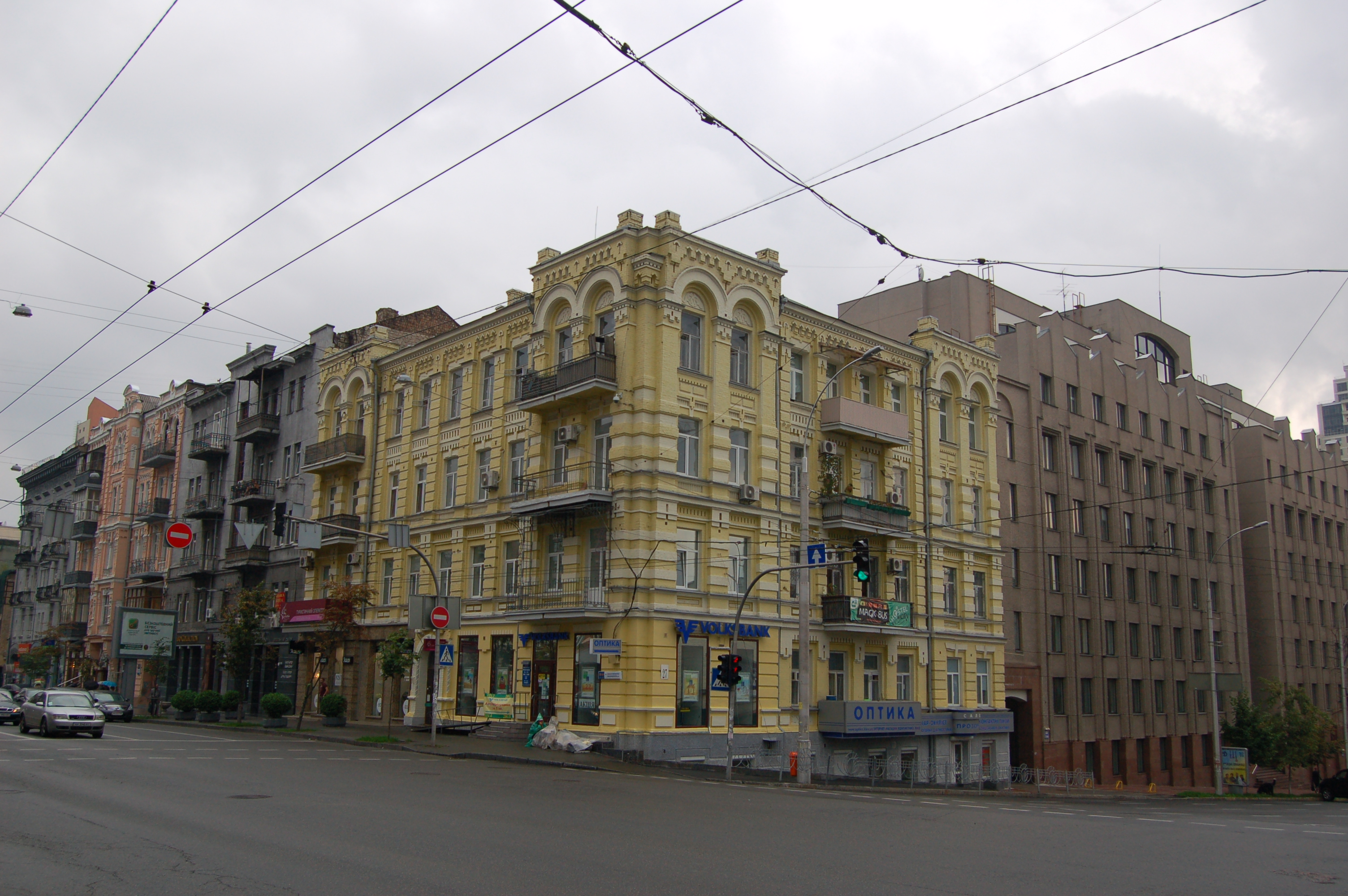
Corner of Antonovycha and Saksahans'koho Streets in 2012

Nova Zabudova (Ukrainian: Нова́ Забудо́ва, lit. New Development) is a historical neighbourhood in central Kyiv, the capital of Ukraine. It is situated on the right bank of Dnieper, in the valley between Lybid river and Pechersk plateau. It arose in the 1830-40s as land allocated for the resettlement of residents from Pechersk, caused by the construction of the New Pechersk Fortress. The neighbourhood is divided between city's Holosiivsky and Pechersky administrative districts. Main streets, that go through the whole length of the neighborhood are Antonovycha and Velyka Vasylkivs'ka.

The neighbourhood is characterized by a grid layout and a mix of architectural styles, including 19th and early 20th century architectural monuments, modernist estates and contemporary skyscrapers. Notable places include Olimpiyskiy National Sports Complex, St. Nicholas Roman Catholic Church, Palace "Ukraine" and the Constitutional Court of Ukraine. Nova Zabudova (along with Pankivshchyna) has the highest concentration of workplaces in the city.

Nova Zabudova is served by Line 2 of Kyiv Metro, as well as a number of Kyivpastrans buses and trolleybuses.

== History ==
In 1831, Emperor Nicholas I of Russia orders the construction of the New Pechersk Fortress (now known as Kyiv Fortress) during which from 1837 to 1846, 533 houses in an area known as Pechersk Vorstadt were demolished. According to a local historian Mykhailo Rybakov, in total, during 22 years of construction 1180 buildings were demolished in Pechersk, most of which were primitive wooden houses. Former residents of the area were resettled and given a total of 220 thousand Rubles in compensation.

In 1837, architect Vincent Beretti compiled a master plan for the development of Kyiv, which included a project for the settlement of the Lybid valley. According to the plan, several new streets were established parallel or across already existing Vasylkivs'ka Street, including Prozorivska (now Vasylia Tiutiunnyka), Predslavynska, Naberezhno-Lybidska (now part of Antonovycha Street) Streets

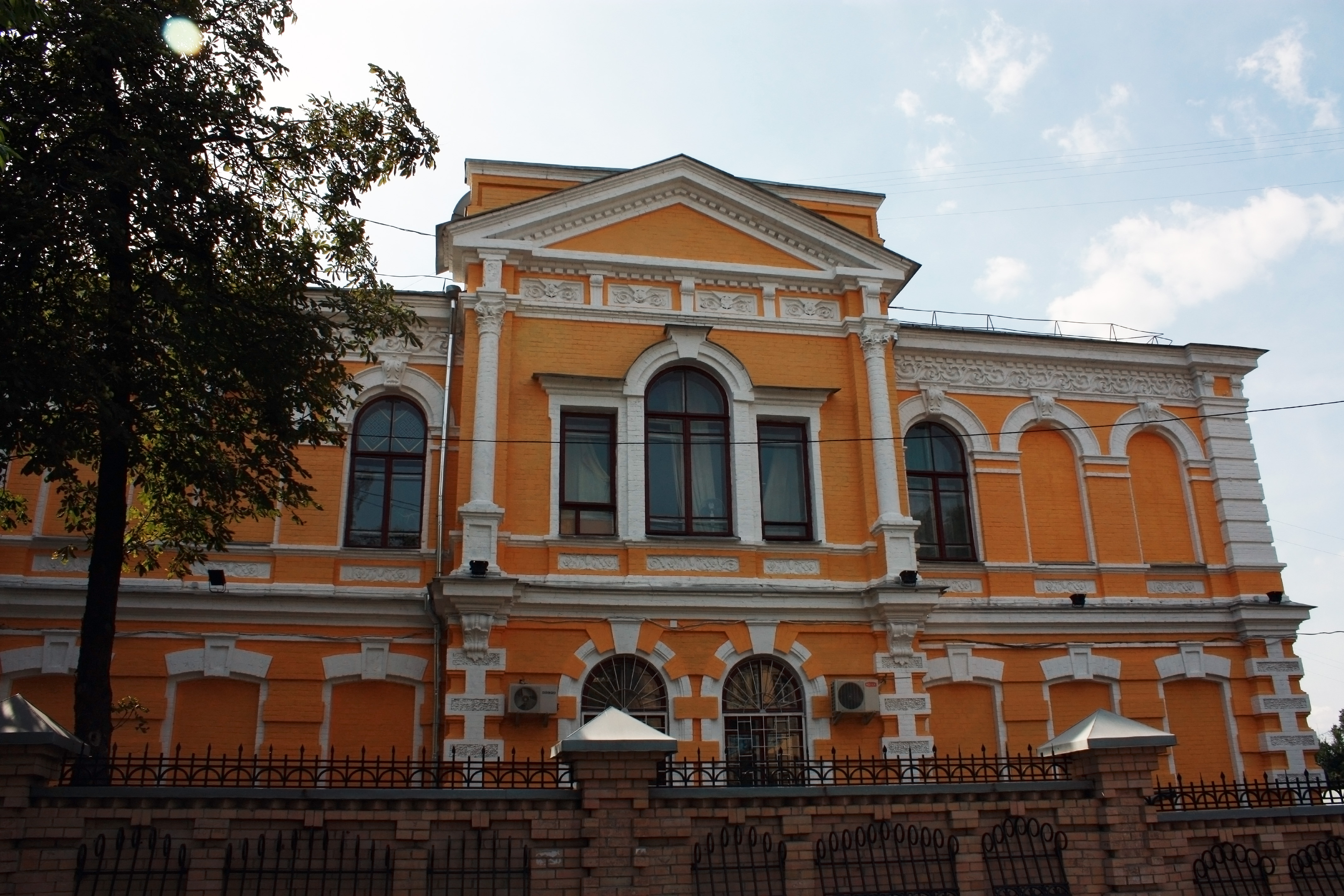
Former building of the 4th Men Gymnasium

Until 1880s, the district remained largely rural in character. On much of the eastern part of the neighborhood the rules regarding construction of civil objects were determined in accordance with the fortress esplanade rules. In 1896, the new rules for maintaining the esplanade of the Kyiv fortress were approved. The rules were accompanied by a plan illustrating the gradation of lands within the vicinity of the fortress and determining the rights of private individuals to these lands. According to these rules, all quarters belonging to New Development, to the west of Prozorivska Street were excluded from the fortress esplanade. Therefore, they were no longer subject to restrictions regarding construction.

With the opening of the railway in Kyiv in 1870, tram lines through the Velyka Vasylkivska Street (1897), number of factories in Demiivka and socially significant buildings, including 4th Men Gymnasium (1899), Troitsky People's House (now Kyiv Theatre of Operetta; 1901) and St. Nicholas Catholic Church (1893-1909) along the main streets of the neighbourhood, the area became popular with real estate developers. At the turn of the century, the area became dominated by revenue houses — four and five-story buildings with the first floors occupied by shops and the rest by long-term rental apartments.

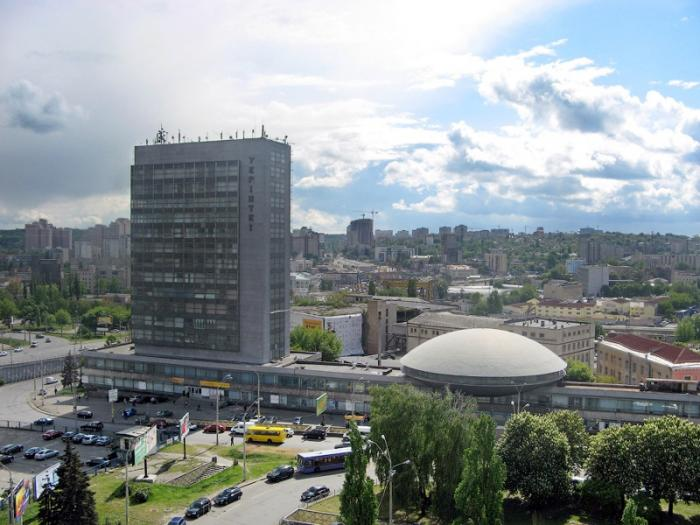
State Scientific and Technical Library of Ukraine

In 1913, in place of Troitsky Market, the pavilion complex, for the first All-Russian Exhibition in Kyiv was built. In the early 1920s, the construction of a sports stadium was planned here, but postponed due to the lack of funds. The stadium was eventually opened in 1949.

In 1969, on the corner of Velyka Vasylkivs'ka and Saksahans'koho streets, the first 16-storey building in the city was constructed. In 1971, the complex of State Scientific and Technical Library was completed on Lybids'ka square. In October of 2020, Ministry of Culture included the building in the registry of architectural monuments.

In early 1980s, four stations of Line 2 of Kyiv Metro were opened in the neighbourhood — Ploshcha Ukrainskykh Heroiv, Olimpiiska, Palats Ukraina and Lybidska. Lybidska station served as a terminus, until the line was expanded southward in 2010.

Throughout the 1980s, the remaining old one and two storey buildings were demolished by the city government. In their place, on the southern outskirts of the neighbourhood, around the Antonovycha and Malevycha streets a large non-typical, multiblock, high rise modernist estate was built.

In 2001-2003, tram lines on Saksahans'koho, Antonovycha and Malevycha streets were liquidated. In 2004, Shevchenko Tram Depot located on Antonovycha street was relocated and demolished, leaving the neighbourhood without tram infrastructure. In March of 2020, the Kyiv City State Administration approved the construction of a tram line in central Kyiv, including areas belonging to Nova Zabudova.

== Gallery ==
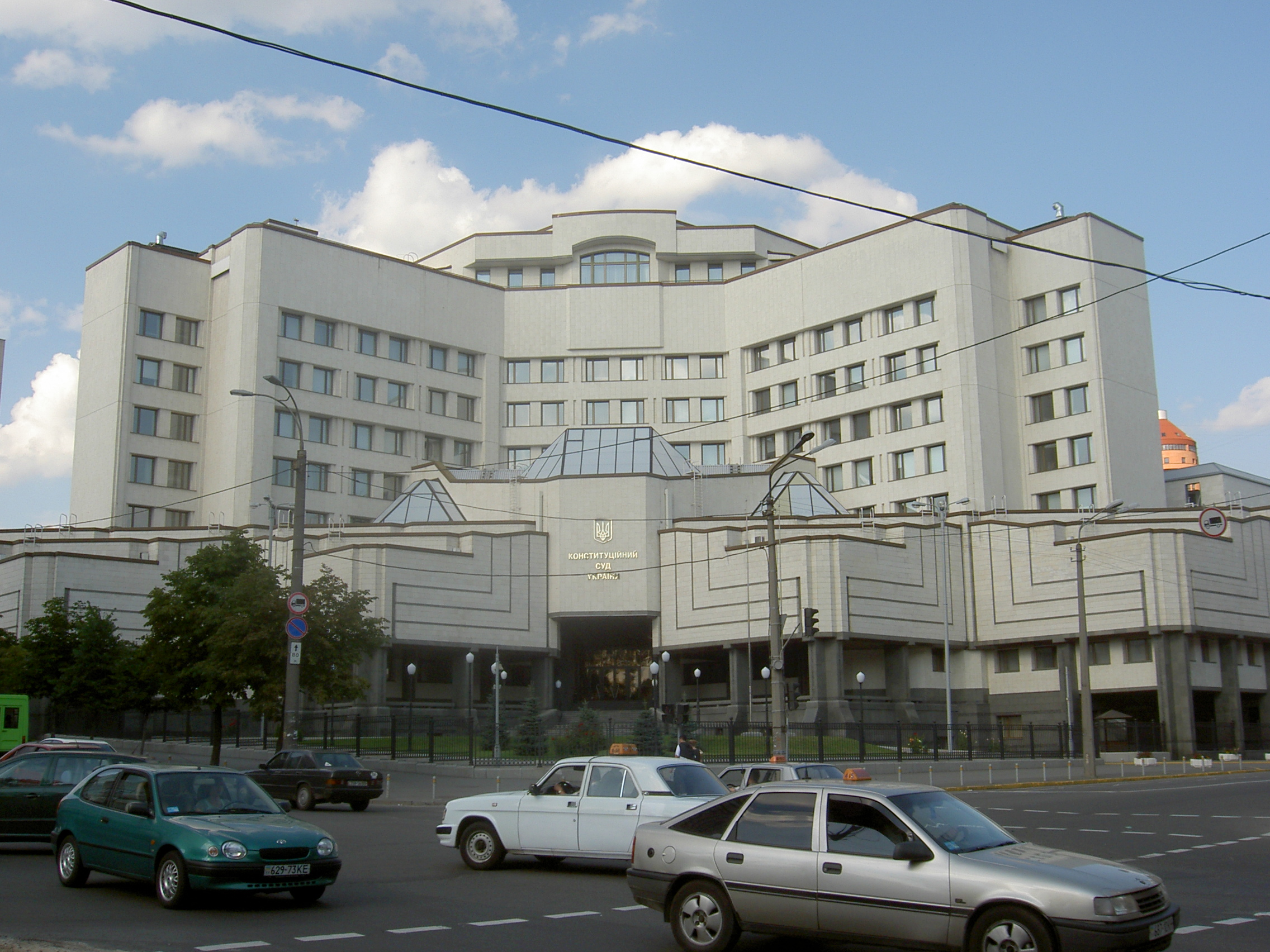
Constitutional Court of Ukraine

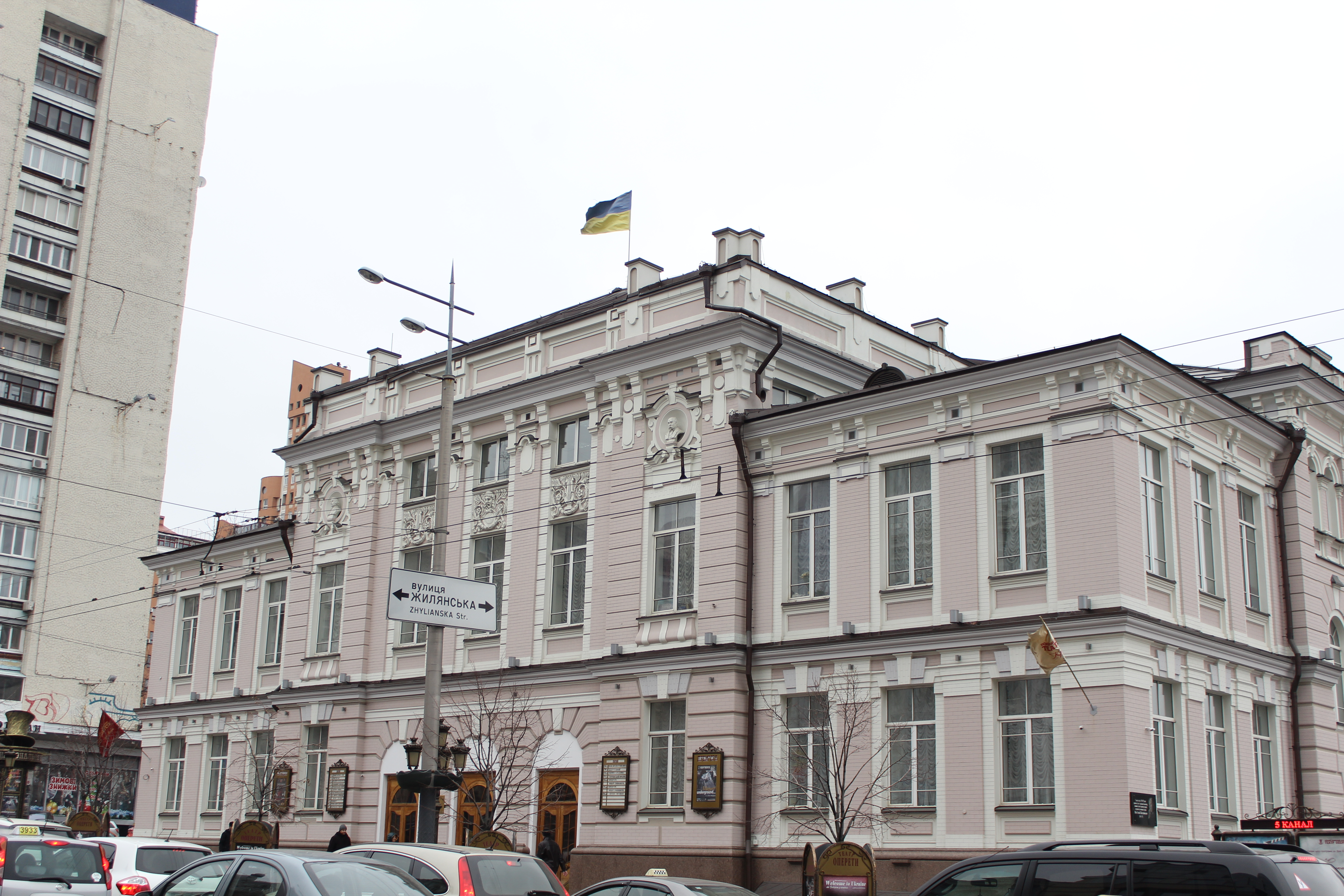
National Theatre of Operetta

Troitska Square and NSC Olimpiisky

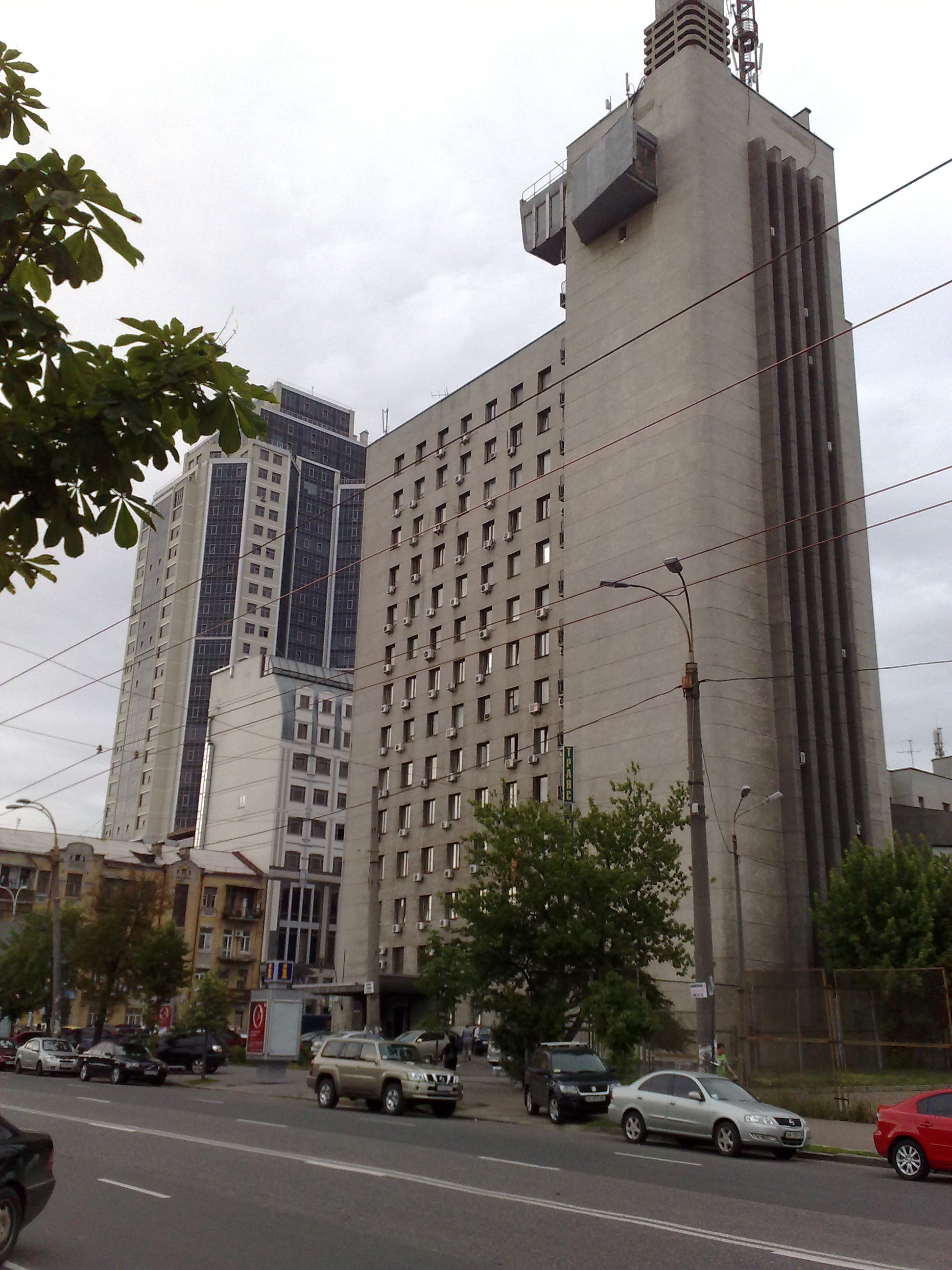
Building of the State Agency of Automobile Roads

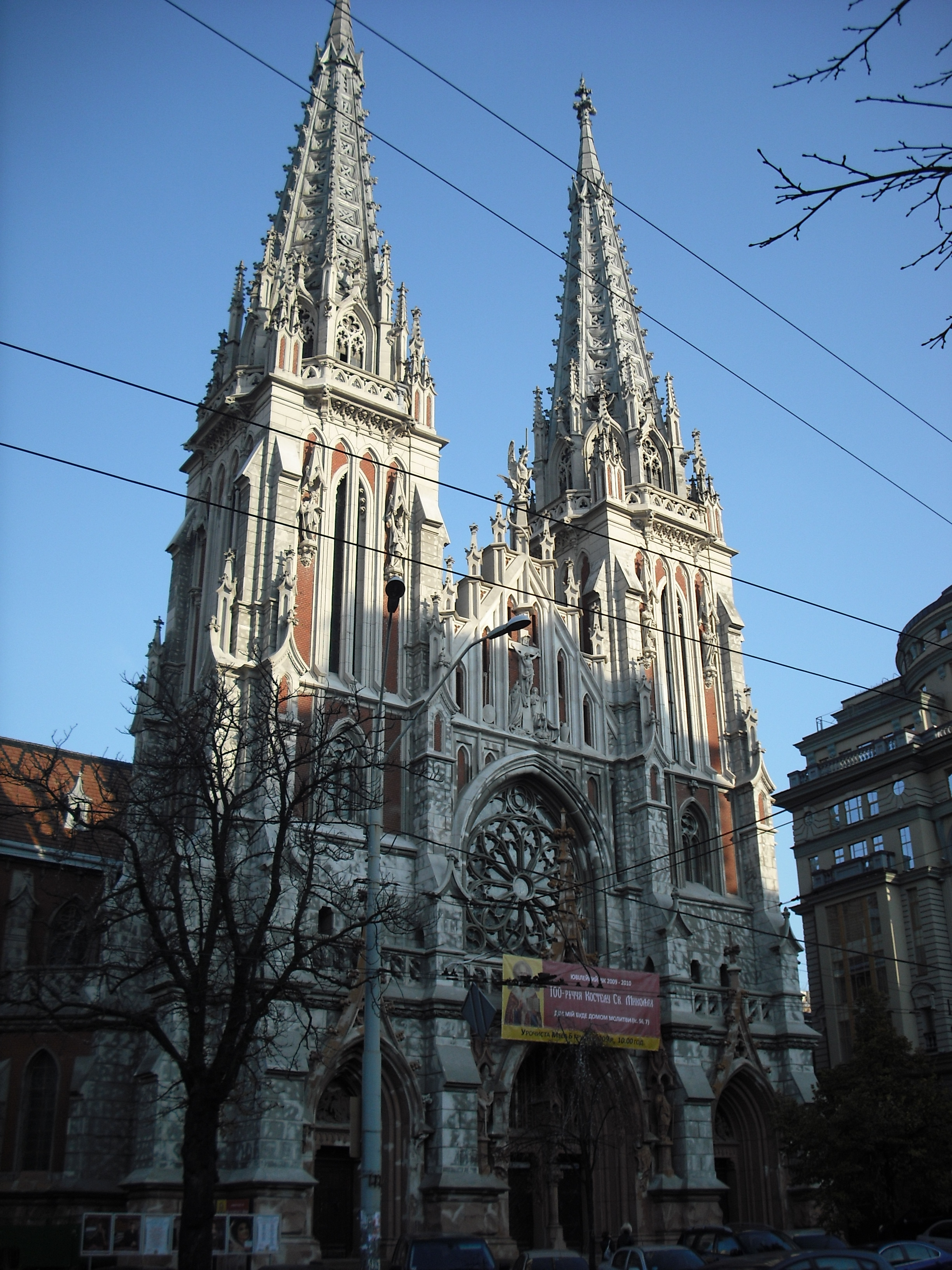
Saint Nicholas Roman Catholic Church

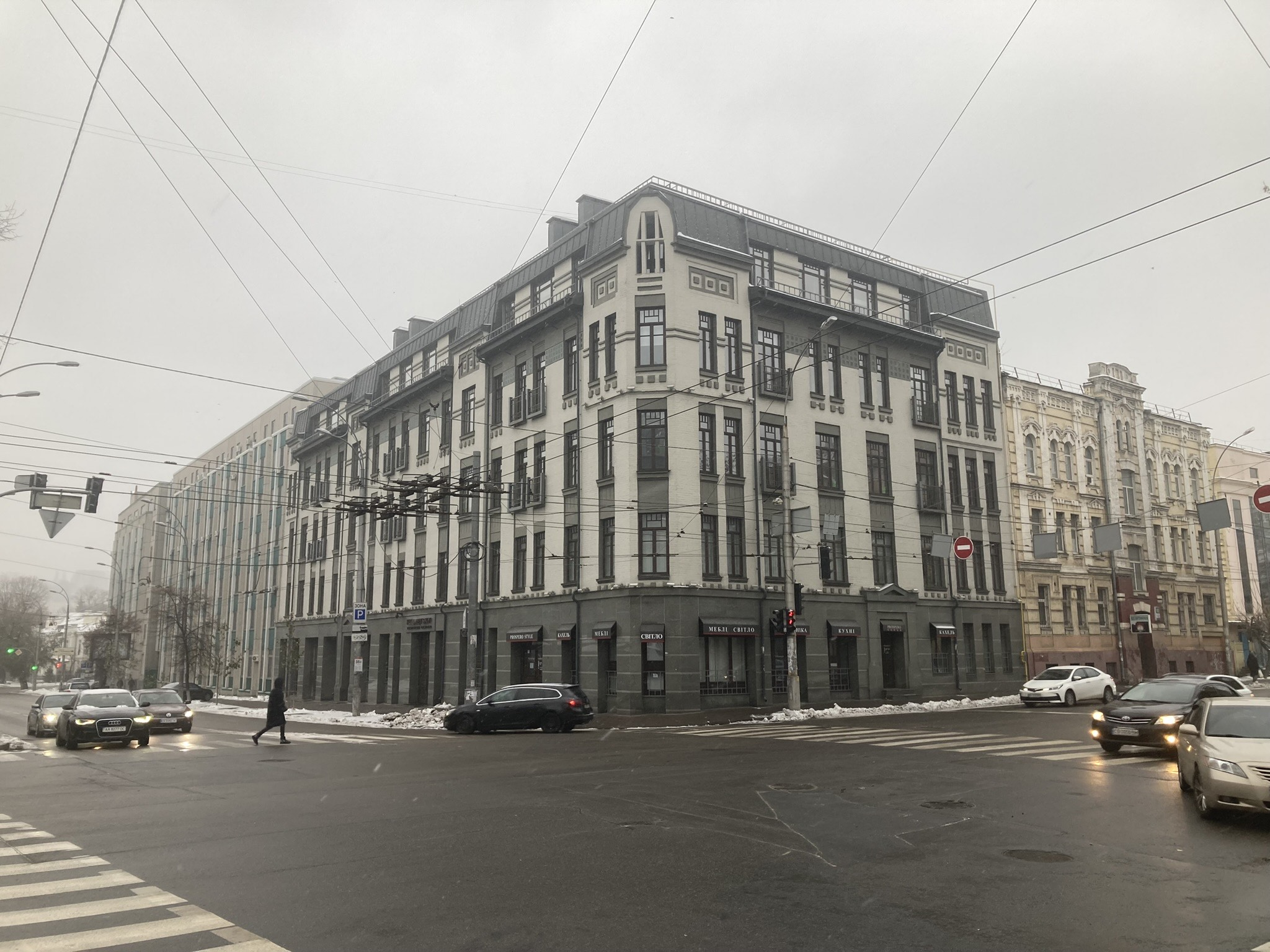
Corner of Antonovycha and Fedorova Streets

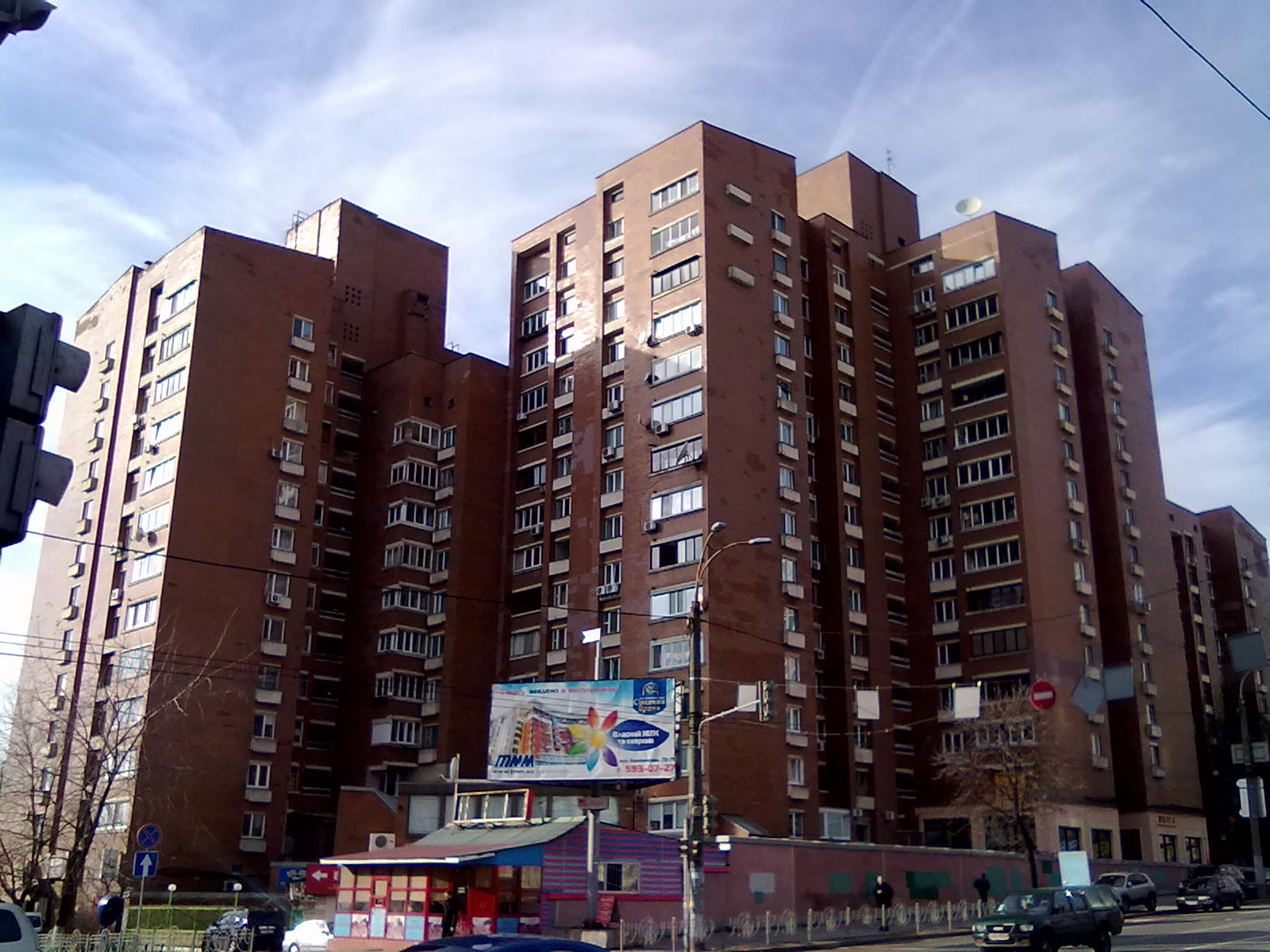
Part of the residential estate on Antonovycha Street

== Sources ==
- Друг, О. (2013). Вулицями старого Кієва. Світ. http://irbis-nbuv.gov.ua/cgi-bin/ua/elib.exe?Z21ID=&I21DBN=UKRLIB&P21DBN=UKRLIB&S21STN=1&S21REF=10&S21FMT=online_book&C21COM=S&S21CNR=20&S21P01=0&S21P02=0&S21P03=FF=&S21STR=00004038%5F01
- Media related to Nova Zabudova at Wikimedia Commons
