= Republican Stadium =

Republican Stadium can refer to:

- Republican Stadium, former name of Olimpiyskiy National Sports Complex in Kyiv and the nearby Olimpiiska (Kyiv Metro) station
- Republican Stadium (Chișinău), in Chişinău, Moldova
- Stepanakert Republican Stadium, in Xankəndi (Stepanakert), Nagorno-Karabakh
- Vazgen Sargsyan Republican Stadium, in Yerevan, Armenia
- Republican Spartak Stadium, Vladikavkaz, Russia
- Lokomotiv Republican Sports Complex, in Simferopol, territory of Ukraine, occupied by Russia
