= Vystavkovyi Tsentr (Kyiv Metro) =

Kyiv Metro Station

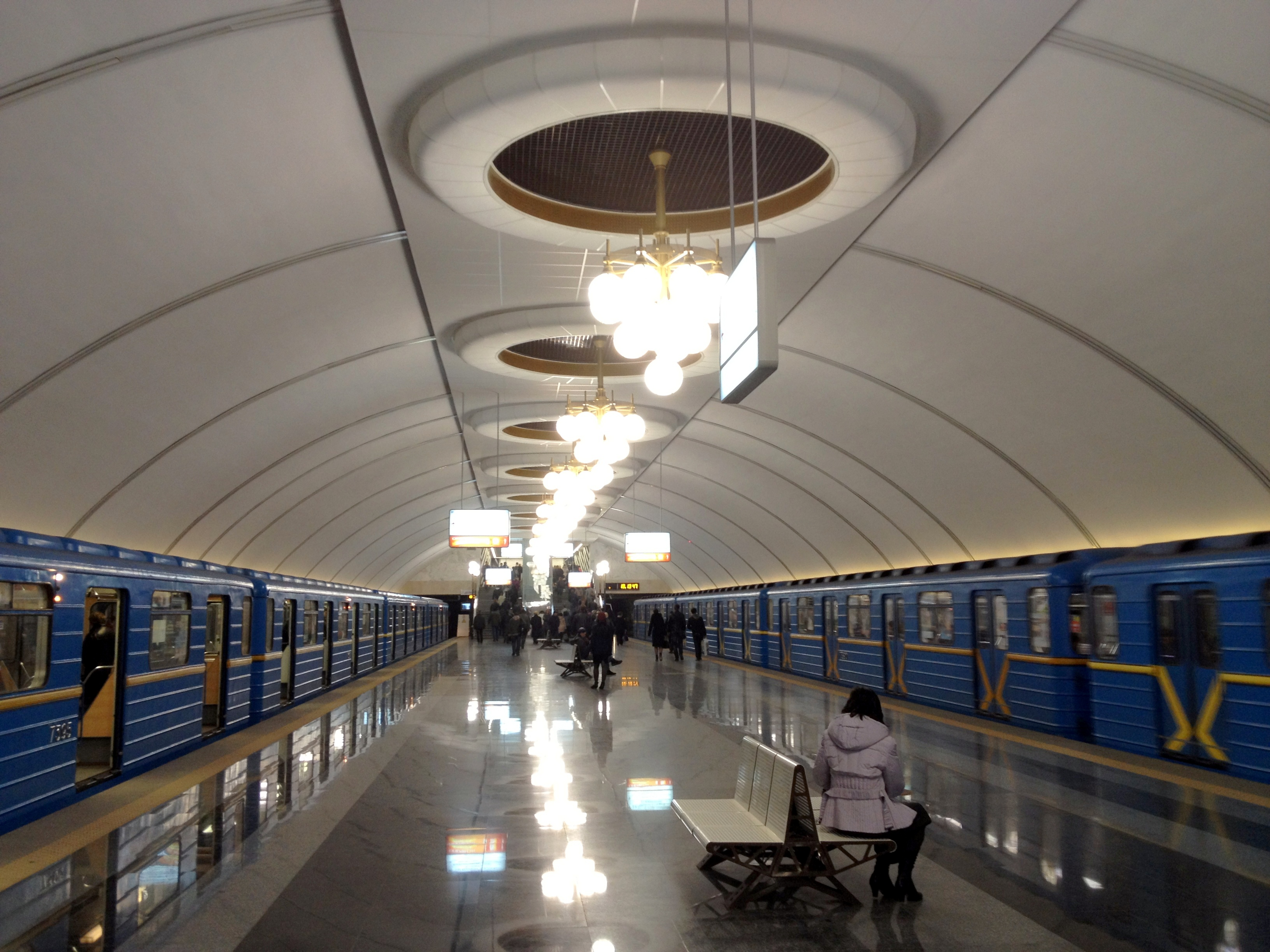

General information
- Location: Holosiivskyi District; Kyiv; Ukraine
- Coordinates: 50°22′57″N 30°28′39″E
- System: Kyiv Metro station
- Owner: Kyiv Metro
- Line: Obolonsko–Teremkivska line
- Platforms: 1
- Tracks: 2

Construction
- Structure type: underground
- Platform levels: 1

Other information
- Station code: 225

History
- Opened: 27 December 2011

Services
Preceding station	Kyiv Metro	Following station
Vasylkivska towards Heroiv Dnipra	Obolonsko–Teremkivska line	Ipodrom towards Teremky
Location

Vystavkovyi Tsentr (Ukrainian: Виставковий центр,, lit. 'Exhibition Center') is a station on the Obolonsko–Teremkivska Line of the Kyiv Metro system that serves Kyiv, the capital of Ukraine. The station is named after the exposition center that is located in the vicinity.

Active construction began on this project in 2010 after the opening of the three new stations on the Obolonsko–Teremkivska Line from the former Lybidska terminus.

The station is designed as shallow and has one underground vault, similarly to adjacent "Vasylkivska". The southwestern platform end is linked by a four-stripe escalator to the underground entrance hall, ending into an underpass under Vasylkivska street. Further plans exist to connect it with another one under Holosiivskyi avenue, so as to make one of the exits right beside the exhibition center.

The opening was initially scheduled for 31 December 2011, as re-planned the station was opened on 27 December 2011.

The official opening ceremony took place at 11:00 in the morning, the first train with passengers left for the new station at 13:10.
