= Minska (Kyiv Metro) =

Kyiv Metro Station

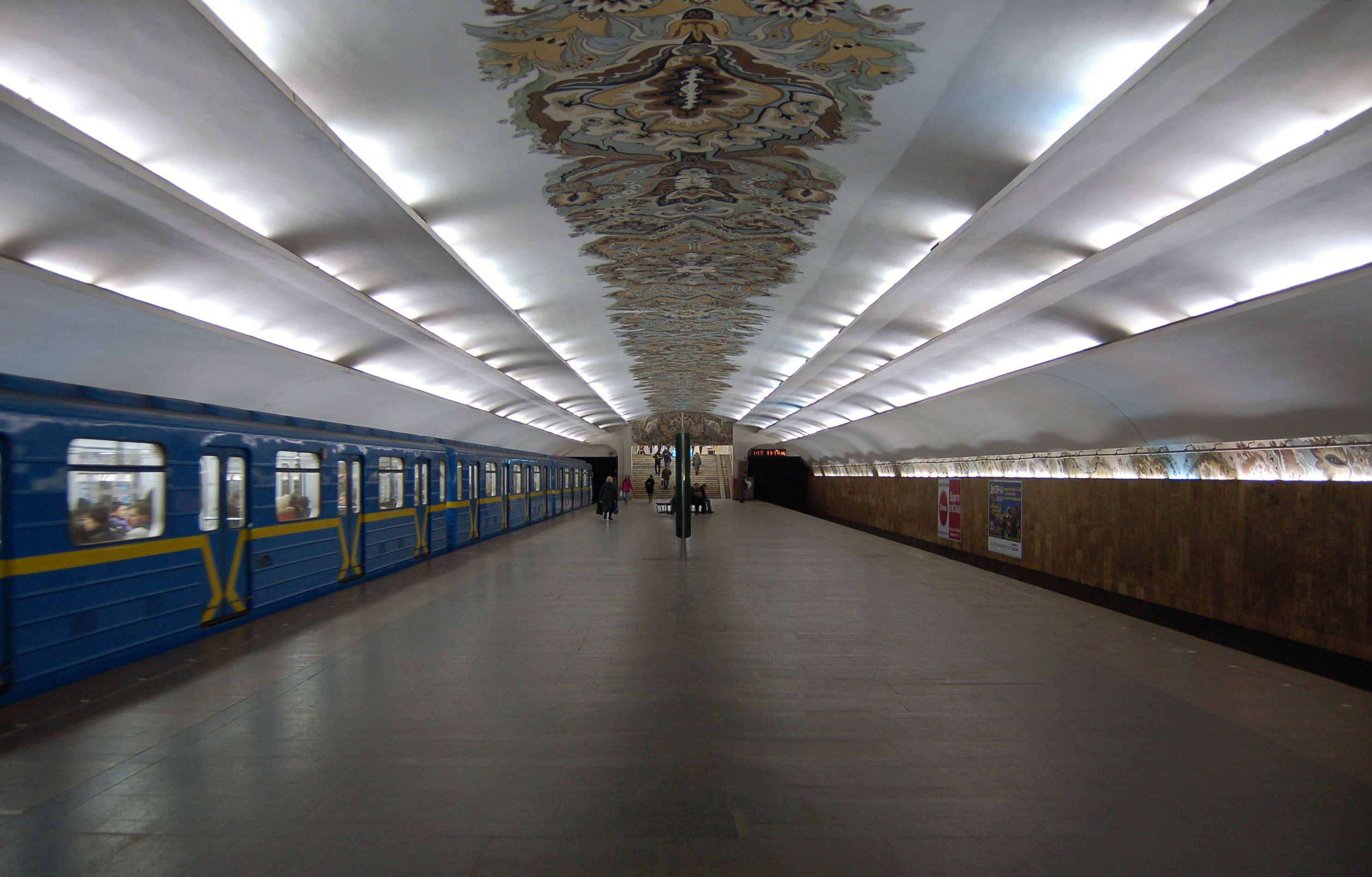
- The Station Hall

General information
- Location: Obolonskyi District; Kyiv; Ukraine
- Coordinates: 50°30′44″N 30°29′55″E
- System: Kyiv Metro station
- Owner: Kyiv Metro
- Line: Obolonsko–Teremkivska line
- Platforms: 1
- Tracks: 2

Construction
- Structure type: underground
- Platform levels: 1

Other information
- Station code: 211

History
- Opened: 6 November 1982

Services
Preceding station	Kyiv Metro	Following station
Heroiv Dnipra Terminus	Obolonsko–Teremkivska line	Obolon towards Teremky
Location

Minska (Ukrainian: Мінська,) is a station on the Obolonsko–Teremkivska Line of the Kyiv Metro system that serves Kyiv, the capital of Ukraine. The station was opened on 6 November 1982 in the Obolonskyi Raion of Kyiv. It was designed by I.L. Maslenkov, T.A. Tselikovska, and F.M. Zaremba. The station takes its name from the Minskyi Raion (now Obolonskyi Raion) in which it is situated.

The station is located shallow underground and is the first Kyiv Metro station with a vaulted roof without column support. Along the tracks, on the ceiling, and above the entrance to the station's hall is a colorful motif, depicting flowers. The station is accessible by two passenger tunnels; one leading to the Obolon'skyi Prospect, and the other — to Levko Lukianenko Street.

Voters chose to rename the station Varshavska — after Warsaw; another choice was Vyshhorodska — in a poll taken during the first months of the 2022 Russian invasion of Ukraine. In April 2023 the Kyiv City Council decided not to rename the station, and the name "Varshavska" was instead assigned to a new station under construction in the Syretsko–Pecherska line. An expert group had recommended not to change the name "Given the long, strong and significant historical and cultural ties of the Belarusian and Ukrainian people" and not rename topnonyms "if they are not named after Belarusian figures who are known for their anti-Ukrainian stance or propaganda of imperial and Soviet policies towards Ukraine." Instead the station was redecorated the colors of the White-red-white flag of Belarus. This flag was the official flag of Belarus from 1991 to 1995, and became one of the symbols the 2020–2021 Belarusian protests.
