= Kontraktova Ploshcha (Kyiv Metro) =

Kyiv Metro station

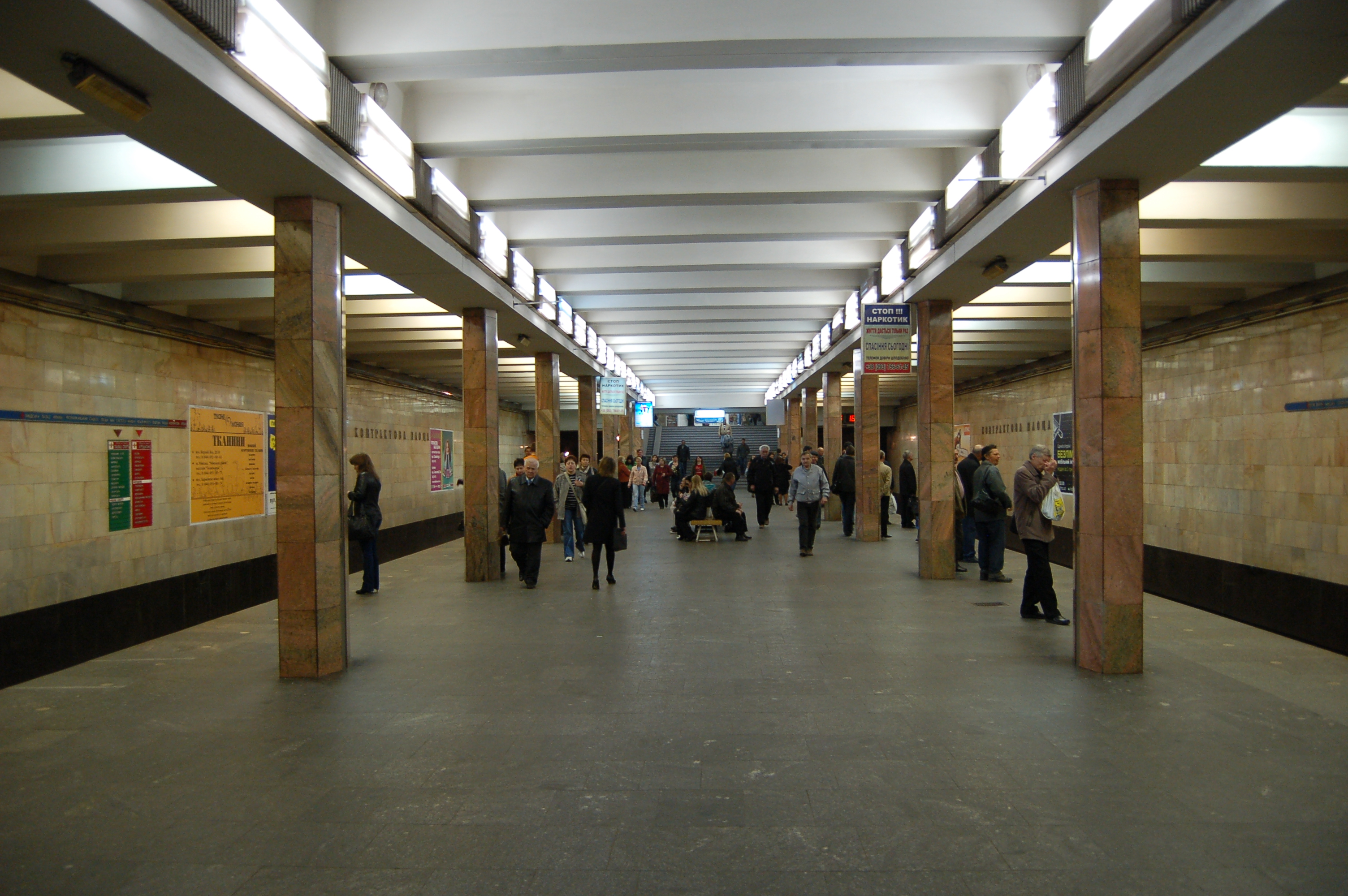
- The Station Hall

General information
- Location: Podilskyi District; Kyiv; Ukraine
- Coordinates: 50°27′55″N 30°31′00″E
- System: Kyiv Metro station
- Owner: Kyiv Metro
- Line: Obolonsko–Teremkivska line
- Platforms: 1
- Tracks: 2

Construction
- Structure type: underground
- Platform levels: 1

Other information
- Station code: 215

History
- Opened: 17 December 1976
- Former names: Chervona Ploscha

Services
| Preceding station | Kyiv Metro | Following station |
|---|---|---|
| Tarasa Shevchenka towards Heroiv Dnipra | Obolonsko–Teremkivska line | Poshtova Ploshcha towards Teremky |
Location

Kontraktova Ploshcha (Ukrainian: Контрактова площа,) is a station on the Obolonsko–Teremkivska Line of the Kyiv Metro system that serves Kyiv, the capital of Ukraine. The station was opened on 17 December 1976, and is named after Kyiv's Kontraktova Square (Square of Contracts) in the historic Podil neighborhood. It was designed by B.I. Pryimak, I.K. Maslenynkov, and F.M. Zaremba. The station was formerly known as Chervona Ploshcha (Ukrainian: Червона площа) until 1990.

The station is located shallow underground and consists of a central hall with columns. The columns and the walls along the tracks have been covered with green-brown coloured marble. Passenger tunnels connect the station to the Kontraktova Square and another street. The station hall has two exits, one of which is equipped with escalators. The exits branch further into the system of 4 elaborated underpasses, covering several city blocks.

== Gallery ==
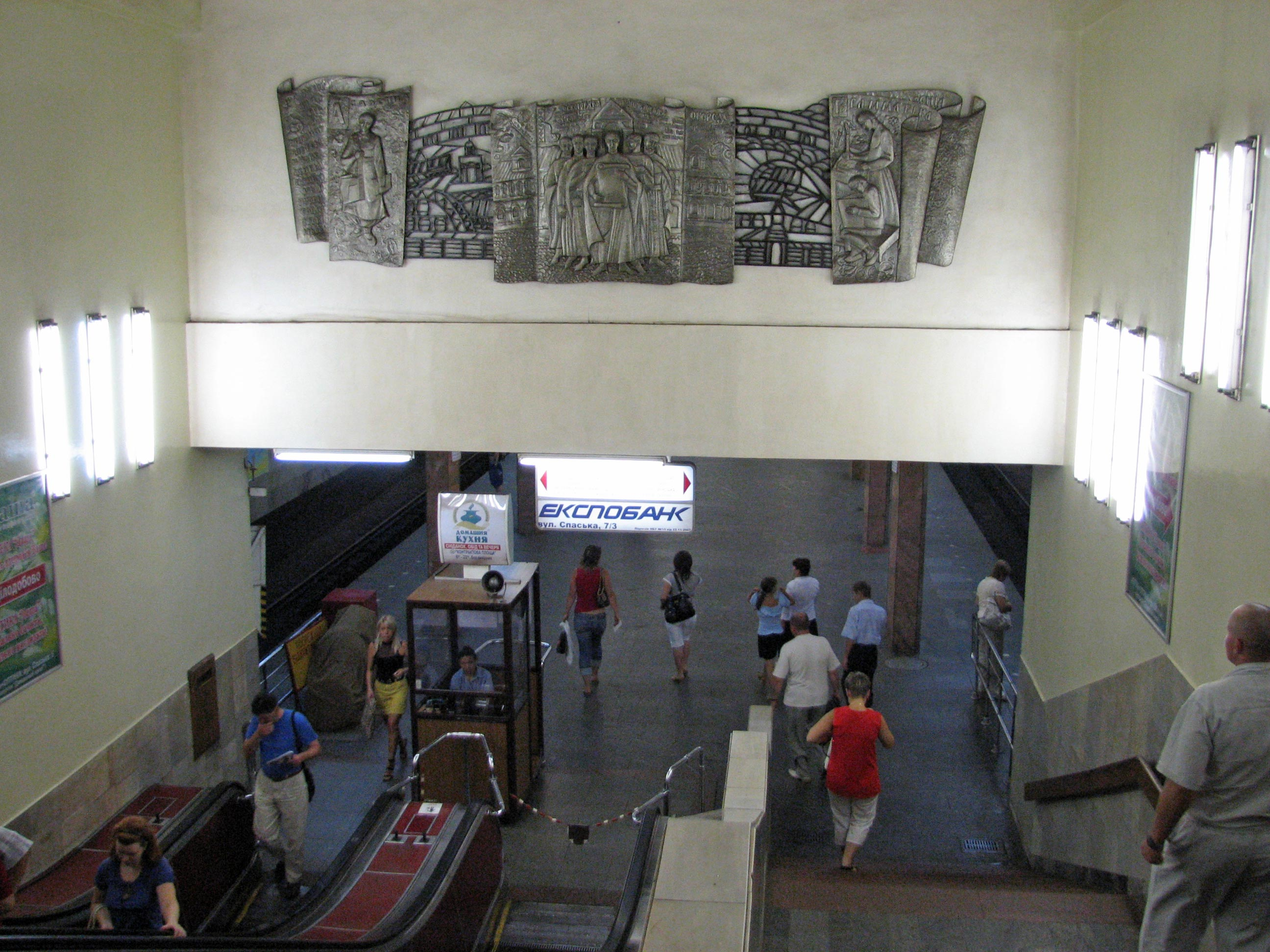
The escalators down to the station hall
