= Obolon (Kyiv Metro) =

Kyiv Metro Station

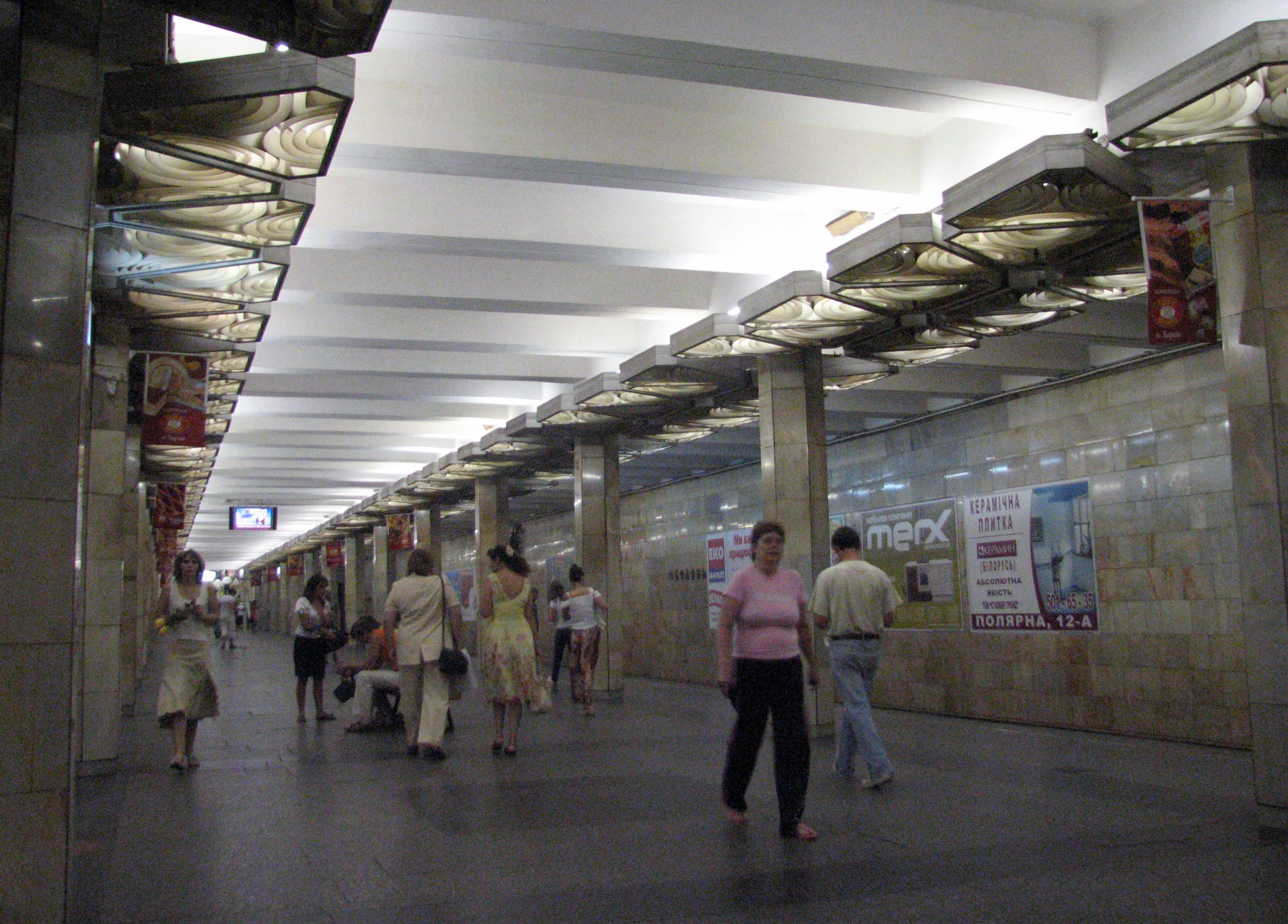
- The Station Hall

General information
- Location: Obolonskyi District; Kyiv; Ukraine
- Coordinates: 50°30′05″N 30°29′53″E
- System: Kyiv Metro station
- Owner: Kyiv Metro
- Line: Obolonsko–Teremkivska line
- Platforms: 1
- Tracks: 2

Construction
- Structure type: underground
- Platform levels: 1

Other information
- Station code: 212

History
- Opened: 19 December 1980

Services
Preceding station	Kyiv Metro	Following station
Minska towards Heroiv Dnipra	Obolonsko–Teremkivska line	Pochaina towards Teremky
Location

Obolon (Ukrainian: Оболонь,) is a station on Kyiv Metro's Obolonsko–Teremkivska Line in Kyiv, the capital of Ukraine. The station was opened on 19 December 1980 in the southern part of the Obolon Raion (district) of Kyiv. It was designed by T.A. Tselikovska, A.S. Krushynskyi, and A. Pratsiuk. The station was formerly known as Prospekt Korniichuka (Ukrainian: Проспект Корнійчука) until 1990.

The station is located shallow underground and consists of a central hall with columns. The walls along the tracks have been covered with yellow marble and decorated with two bronze works of art. Lights surround the columns, giving the station its light. The station is accessible by passenger tunnels; one leading to the Obolon Prospect, and the other — to Levko Lukianenko Street.

== Gallery ==
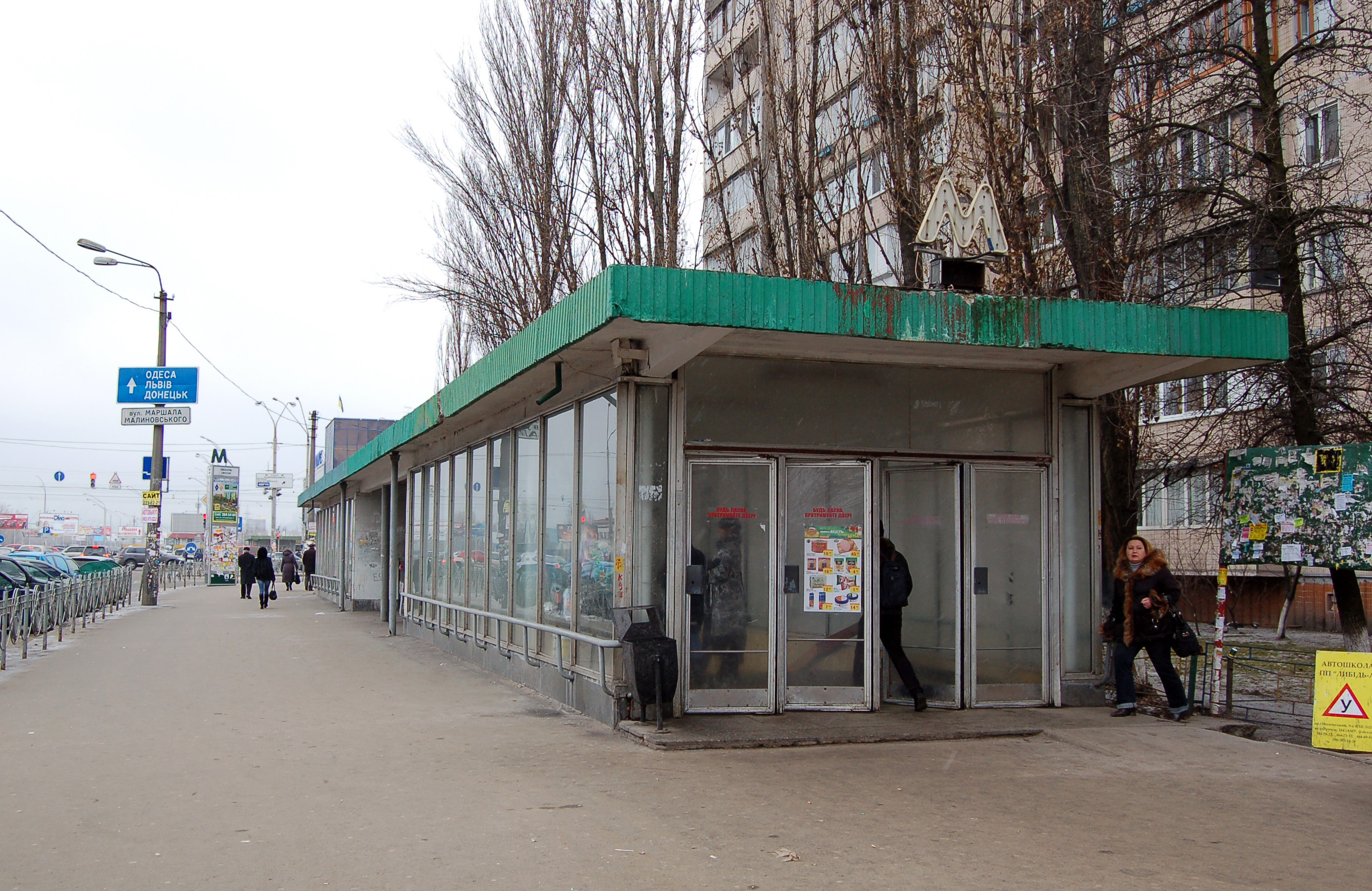
One of the entrances to the station photographed in 2011

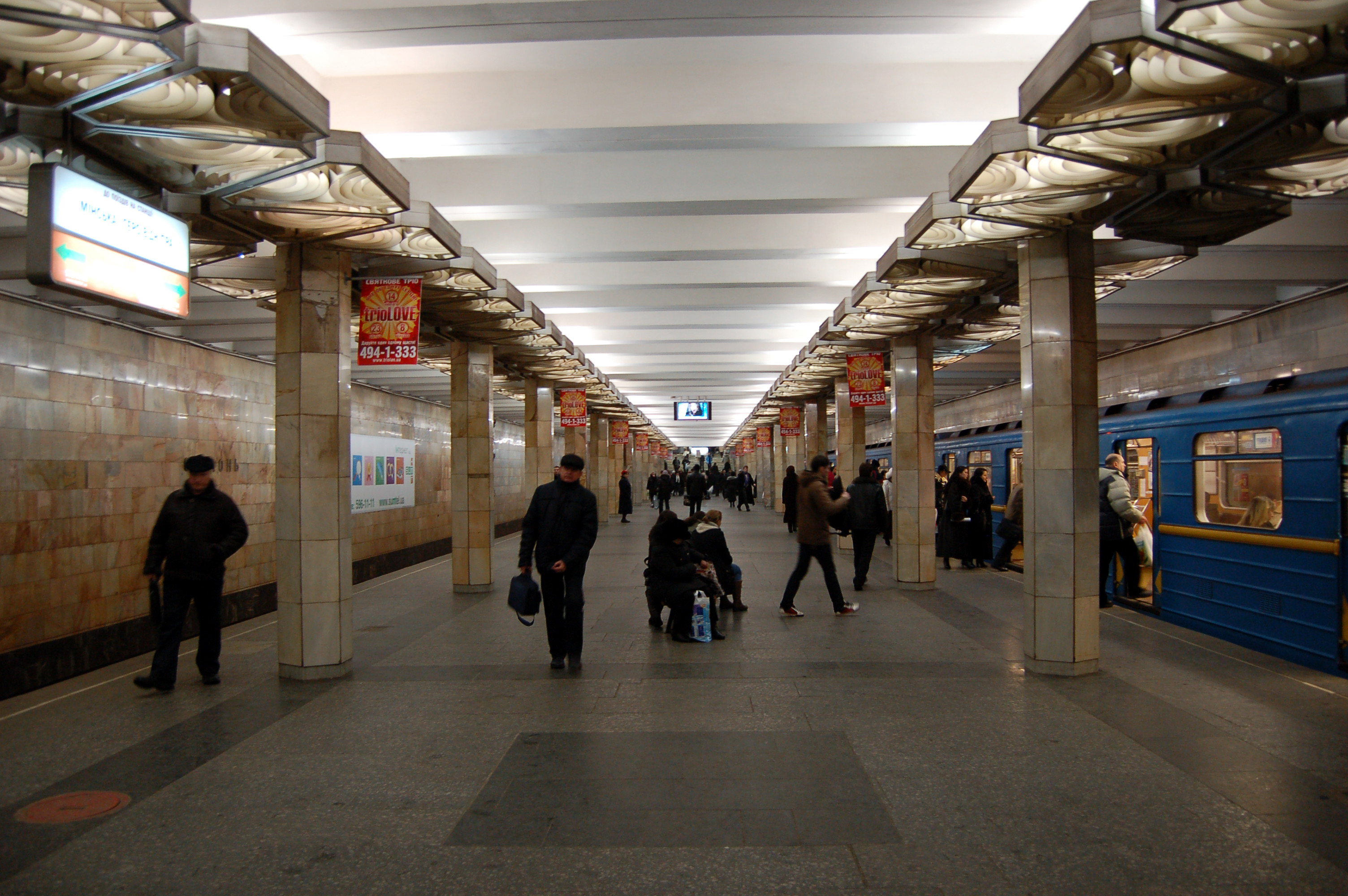
Platform of the station in February 2010

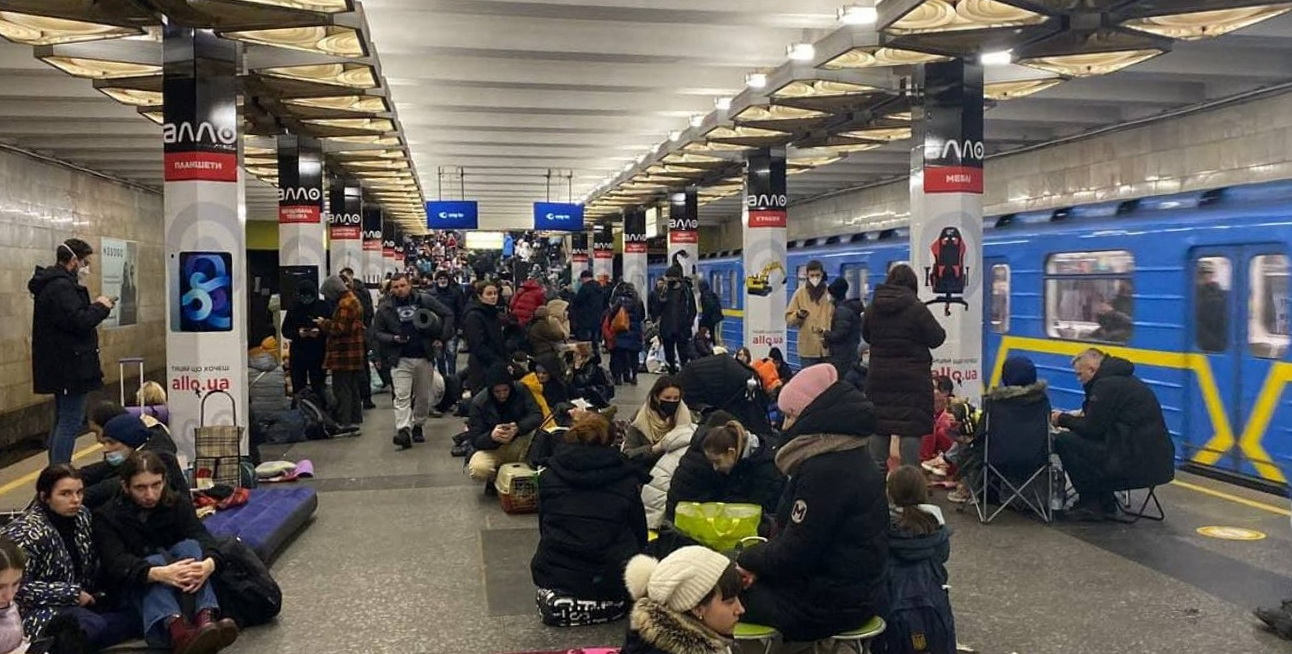
The station on 26 February 2022 converted into an air raid shelter after the 2022 Russian invasion of Ukraine
