= Tarasa Shevchenka (Kyiv Metro) =

Kyiv Metro Station

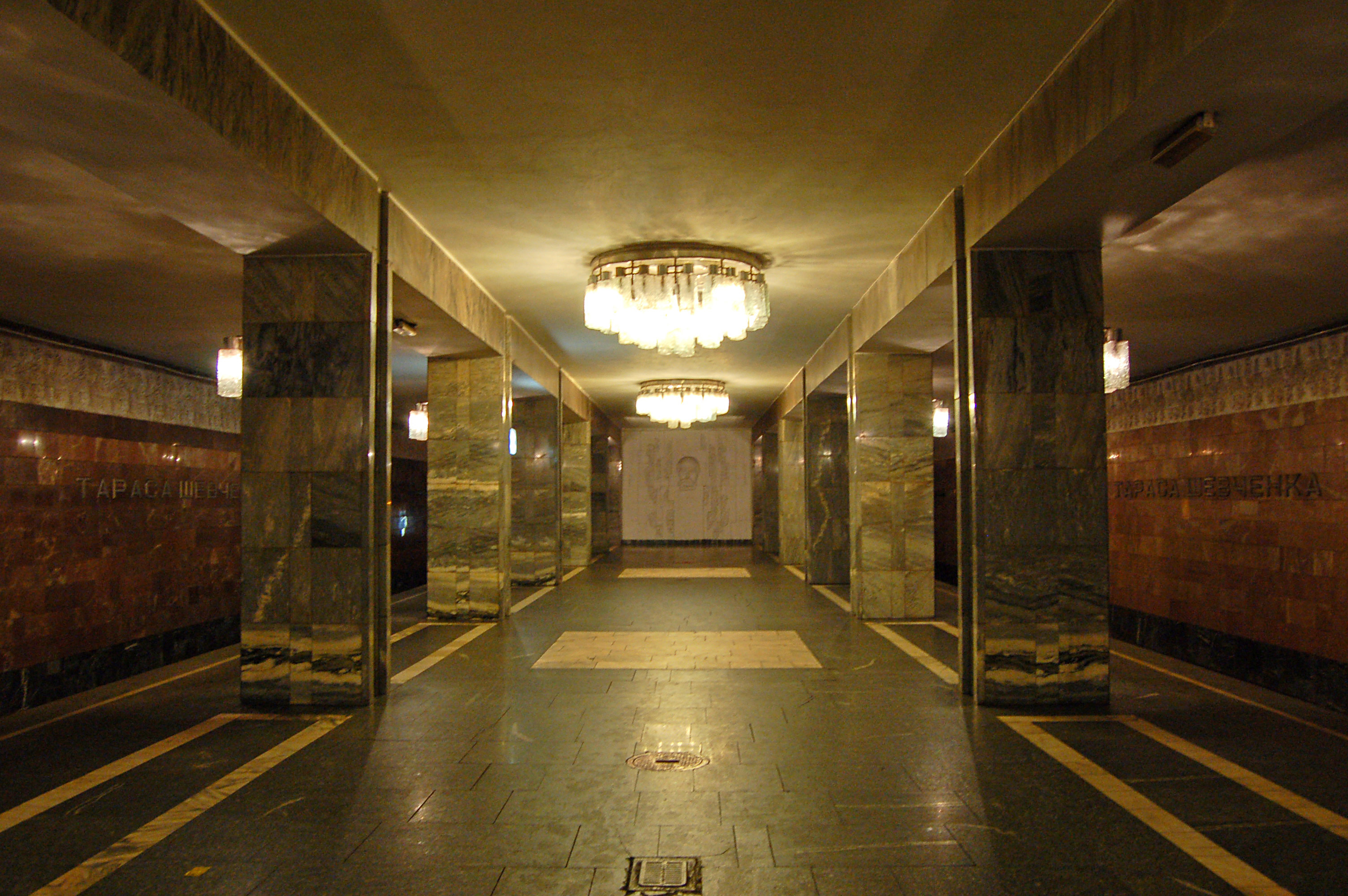
- The Station Hall

General information
- Location: Podilskyi District; Kyiv; Ukraine
- Coordinates: 50°28′23″N 30°30′19″E
- System: Kyiv Metro station
- Owner: Kyiv Metro
- Line: Obolonsko–Teremkivska line
- Platforms: 1
- Tracks: 2

Construction
- Structure type: underground
- Platform levels: 1

Other information
- Station code: 214

History
- Opened: 19 December 1980

Services
Preceding station	Kyiv Metro	Following station
Pochaina towards Heroiv Dnipra	Obolonsko–Teremkivska line	Kontraktova Ploshcha towards Teremky
Location

Tarasa Shevchenka (Ukrainian: Тараса Шевченка,) is a station on Kyiv Metro's Obolonsko–Teremkivska Line in Kyiv, the capital of Ukraine. The station opened on 19 December 1980 in the northern part of the historic Podil neighbourhood and is named after the famous Ukrainian poet, writer, and painter Taras Shevchenko. It was designed by T.A. Tselikovska, A.S. Krushynskyi, and A. Pratsiuk.

The station is located shallow underground and consists of a central hall with rectangular marble pillars. The walls along the tracks have been finished with dark red marble and ceramic tiles with a plant motif. The lighting comes from large round lamps hanging from the ceiling. At the end of the hall is a white stone bust of Taras Shevchenko, surrounded through the same plant motif that is located on the station's walls. The station is accessible by passenger tunnels on the Mezhyhirska and Olenivska Streets.
