= Pochaina (Kyiv Metro) =

Kyiv Metro Station

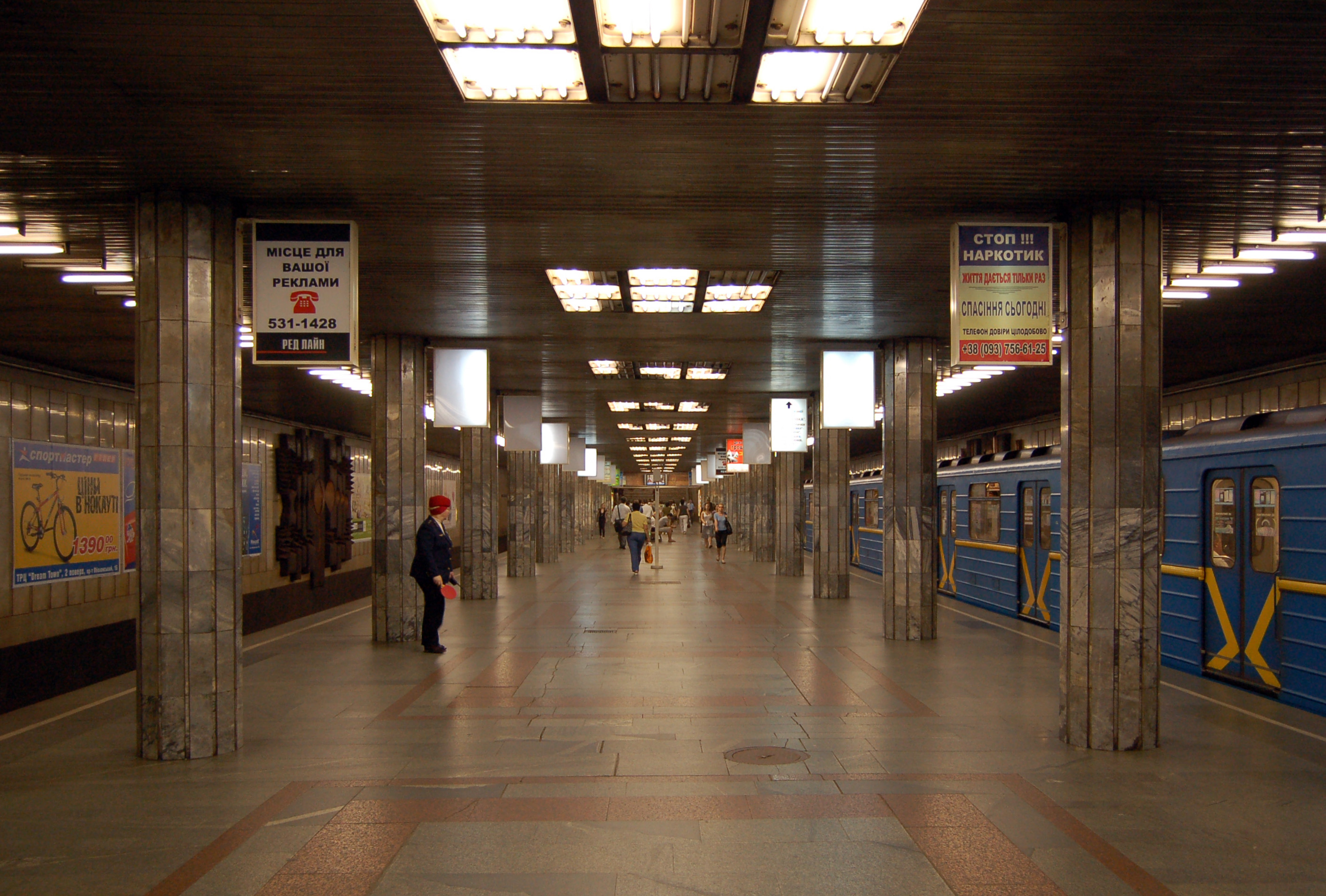
- The Station Hall

General information
- Location: Obolonskyi District; Kyiv; Ukraine
- Coordinates: 50°29′13″N 30°29′52″E
- System: Kyiv Metro station
- Owner: Kyiv Metro
- Line: Obolonsko–Teremkivska line
- Platforms: 1
- Tracks: 2
- Connections: Trolleybus: 25, 27, 29, 30, 31, 34 Bus: 21, 101

Construction
- Structure type: underground
- Platform levels: 1

Other information
- Station code: 213

History
- Opened: 19 December 1980

Services
Preceding station	Kyiv Metro	Following station
Obolon towards Heroiv Dnipra	Obolonsko–Teremkivska line	Tarasa Shevchenka towards Teremky
Location

Pochaina (Ukrainian: Почайна,) is a station on the Obolonsko–Teremkivska line of the Kyiv Metro system that serves Kyiv, the capital of Ukraine. The station was opened on 19 December 1980 in the Petrivka neighborhood of the Podilskyi Raion of Kyiv near Pochaina Railway Station. It was designed by I.L. Maslenkov, T.A. Tselikovska, A.S. Krushynskyi, and F.M. Zaremba.

The station is located shallow underground and consists of a central hall with columns. The walls along the tracks have been covered with yellow marble and decorated with two abstract reliefs. Hanging above one of the entrances into the station's hall is a colorful mosaic. The station is accessible by passenger tunnels; the northern one leading to a square, the southern one — to Pochaina Railway Station.

On the 8 February 2018, Kyiv city council voted to rename Petrivka which commemorated communist politician Grigory Petrovsky to Pochaina after the Pochaina river (in which Prince Volodymyr baptized Kyiv citizens), according to the decommunization law.
