= Ipodrom (Kyiv Metro) =

Kyiv Metro Station

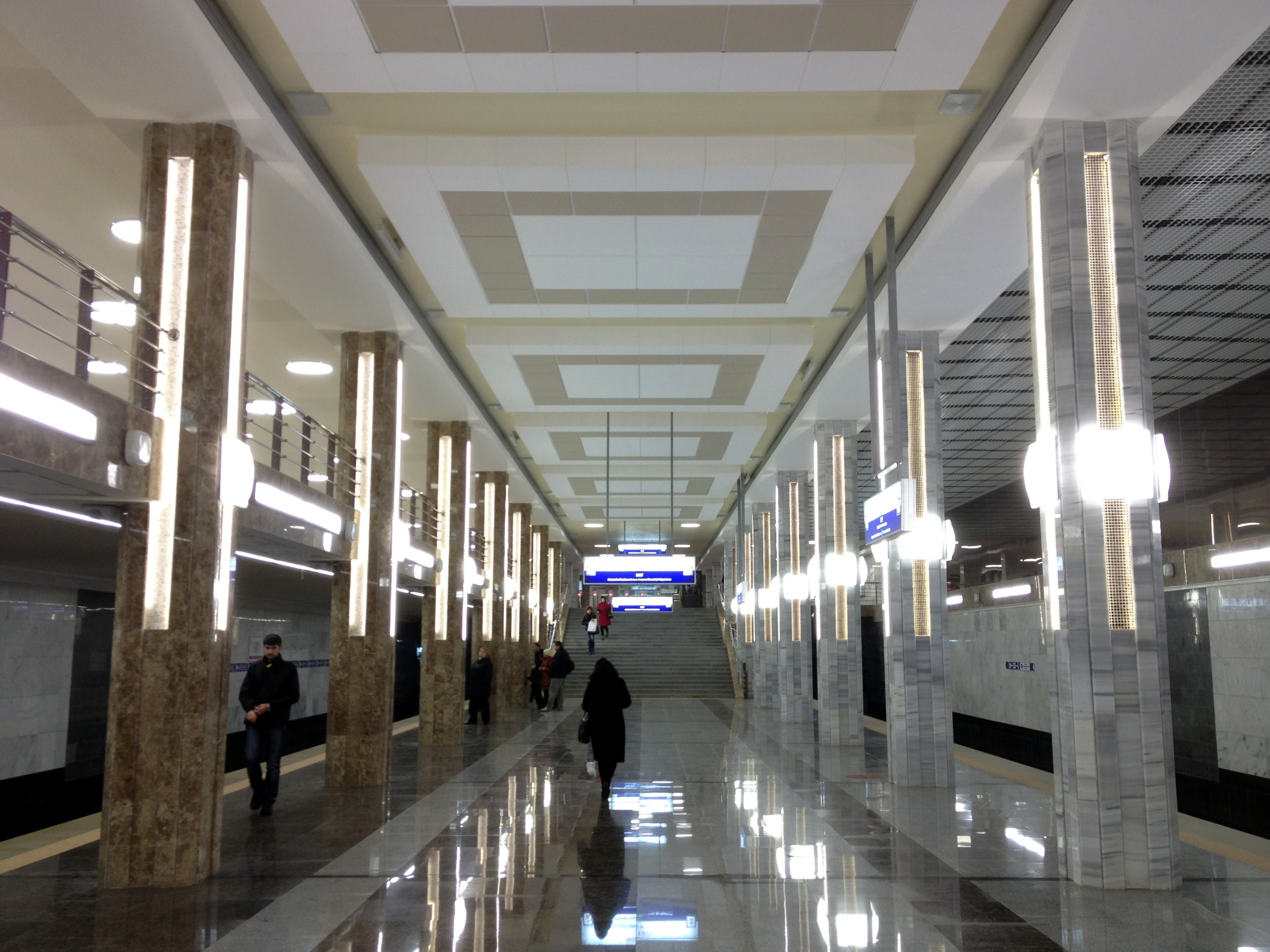

General information
- Location: Holosiivskyi District; Kyiv; Ukraine
- Coordinates: 50°22′35″N 30°28′08″E
- System: Kyiv Metro station
- Owner: Kyiv Metro
- Line: Obolonsko–Teremkivska line
- Platforms: 1
- Tracks: 2

Construction
- Structure type: underground
- Platform levels: 1

Other information
- Station code: 226

History
- Opened: 25 October 2012

Services
Preceding station	Kyiv Metro	Following station
Vystavkovyi Tsentr towards Heroiv Dnipra	Obolonsko–Teremkivska line	Teremky Terminus
Location

Ipodrom (Ukrainian: Іподром,) is an underground station on the Kyiv Metro's Obolonsko–Teremkivska Line that opened on 25 October 2012. It is located towards the southern end of the line, located just after the Vystavkovyi Tsentr station, opened a year earlier in late 2011, and before the Teremky station which opened on 6 November 2013.

Ipodrom is named after Kyiv's horse racetrack and equestrian park which is located a short distance from the station.

Entrance to the station

View of the station from elevation

Racetrack Grandstand
