= Palats Ukraina (Kyiv Metro) =

Kyiv Metro Station

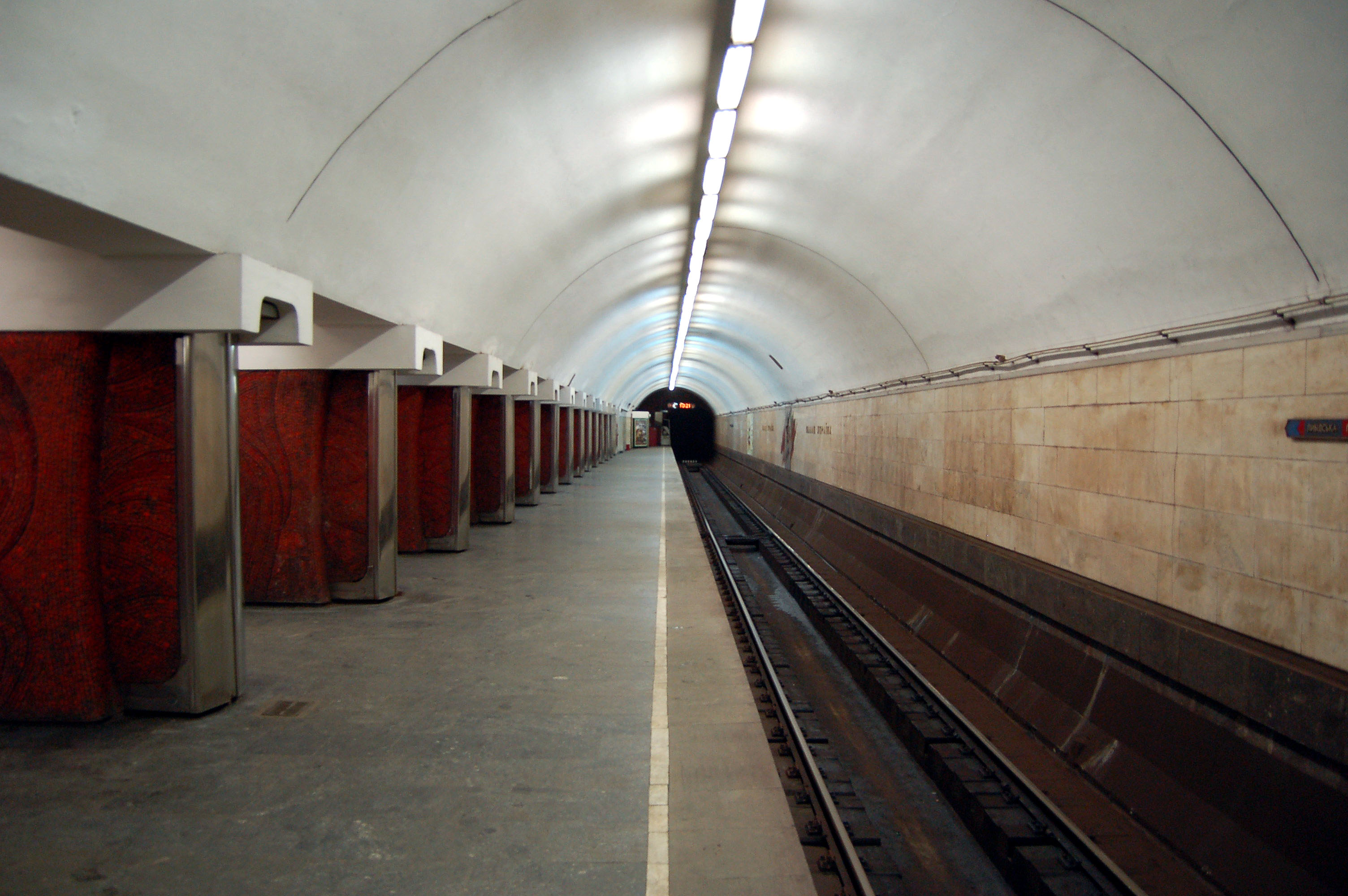
- Station platform

General information
- Location: Pecherskyi District; Kyiv; Ukraine
- Coordinates: 50°25′15″N 30°31′15″E
- System: Kyiv Metro station
- Owner: Kyiv Metro
- Line: Obolonsko–Teremkivska line
- Platforms: 2
- Tracks: 2

Construction
- Structure type: underground
- Platform levels: 1

Other information
- Station code: 220

History
- Opened: 30 December 1984
- Former names: Chervonoarmiyska

Services
Preceding station	Kyiv Metro	Following station
Olimpiiska towards Heroiv Dnipra	Obolonsko–Teremkivska line	Lybidska towards Teremky
Location

Palats Ukraina (Ukrainian: Палац «Україна»,) is a station on the Obolonsko–Teremkivska Line of the Kyiv Metro system that serves Kyiv, the capital of Ukraine.. The station was opened on 30 December 1984, and is named after Ukraine's biggest concert hall located near it. The architecture was designed by A.S. Krushynskyi, T.A. Tselikovska, N. Alyoskin, with other design by S. Kirichenko and R. Kirichenko.

Before 1991, the station was known as Chervonoarmiiska (Ukrainian: Червоноармійська, "Red Army") after the former name of the Velyka Vasylkivska street above it. All Soviet decorations in the station (thus including the ones pictured below) were removed due to 2015 decommunization laws.

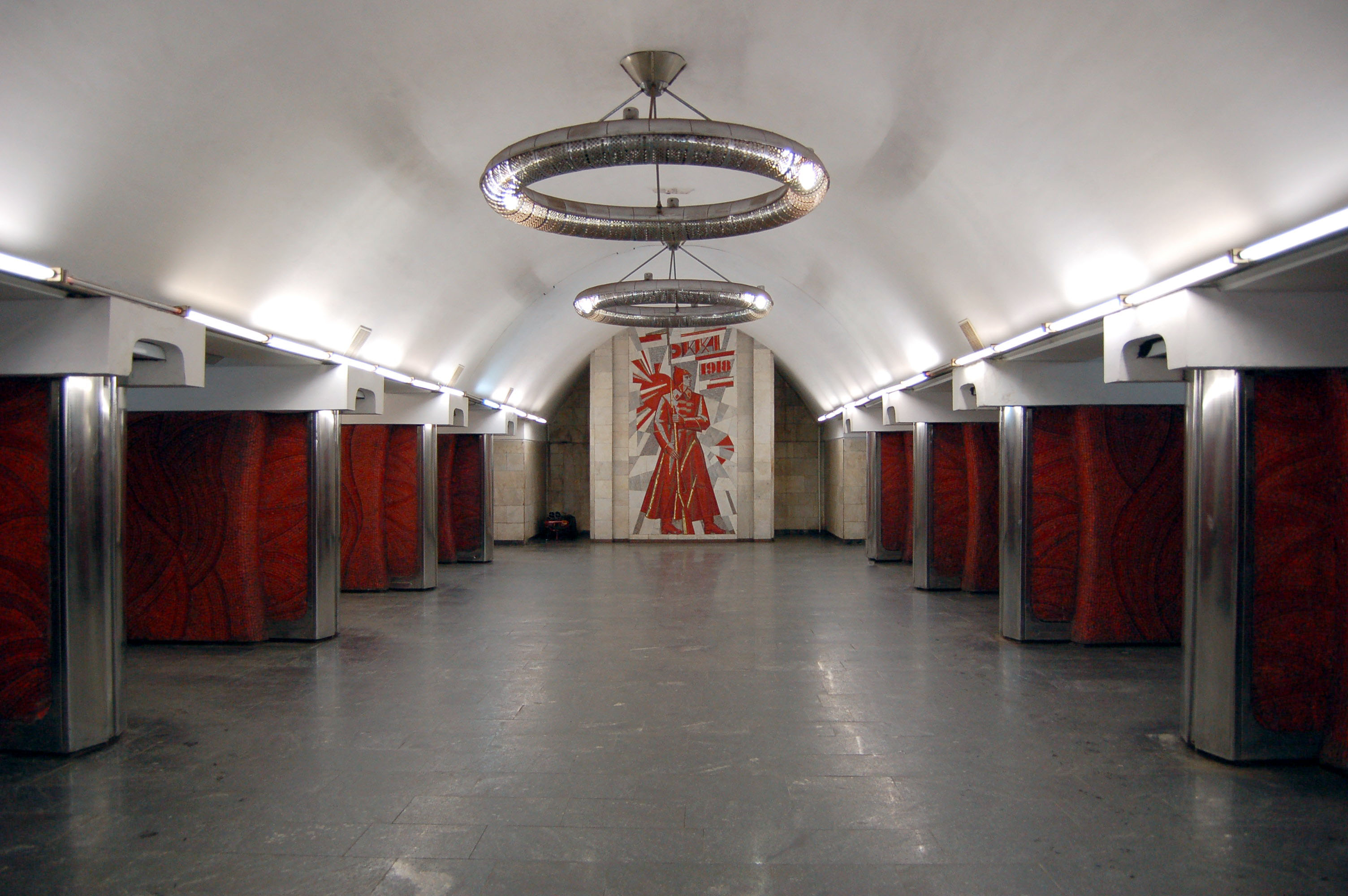
Station hall in 2010

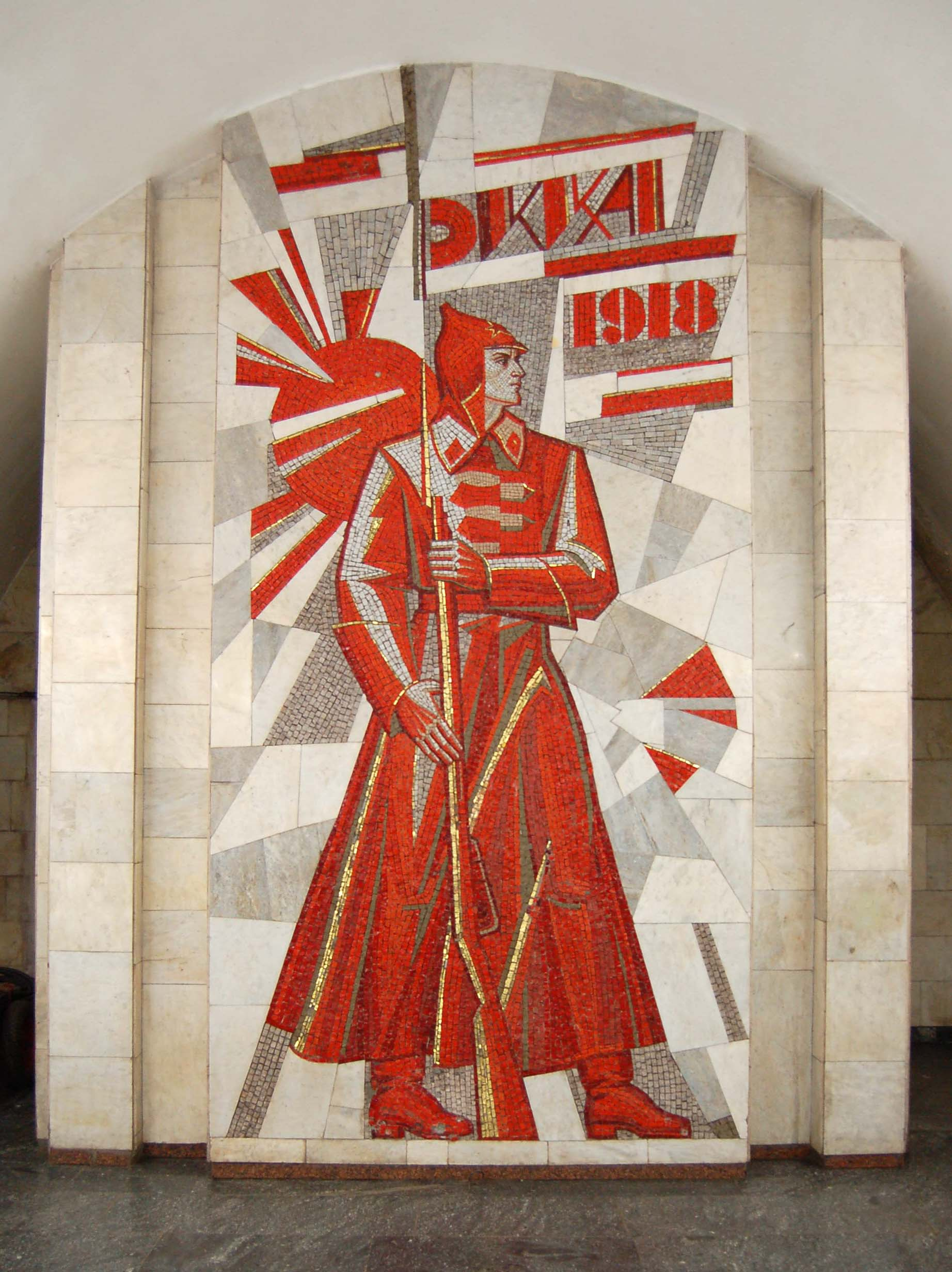
Station wall decor.

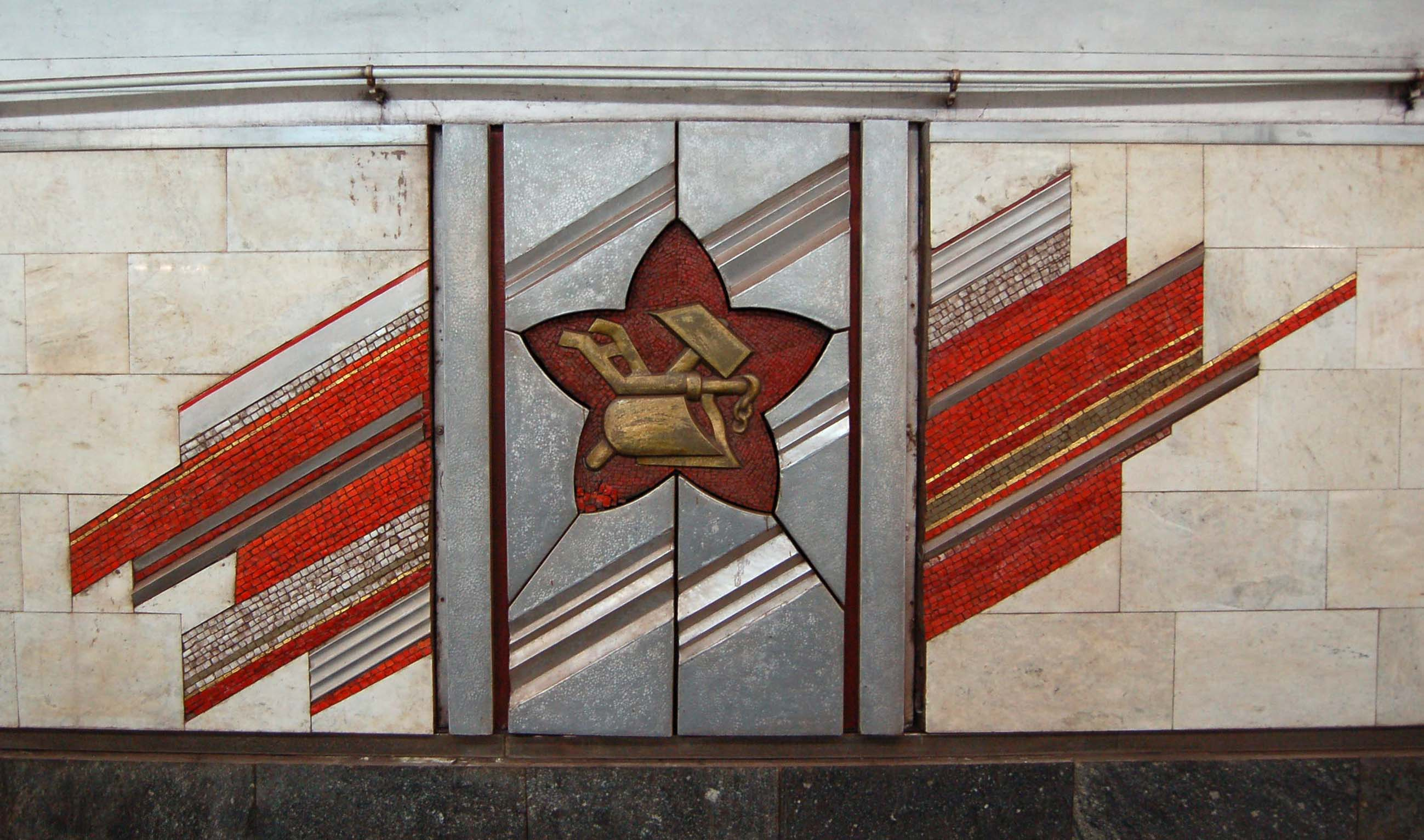
Station wall decor.

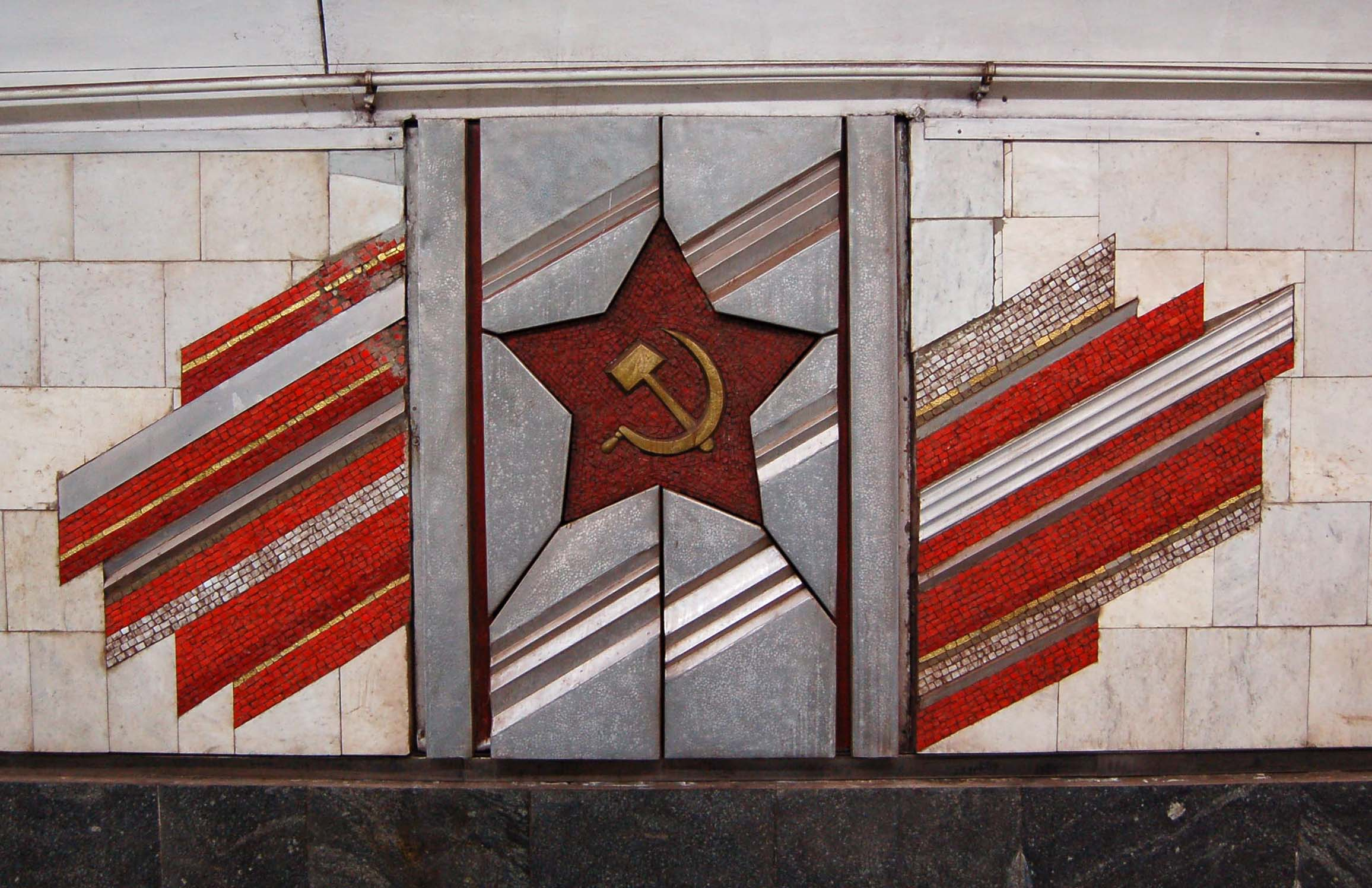
Station wall decor.
