= Lybidska (Kyiv Metro) =

Kyiv Metro Station

Lybidska Либідська
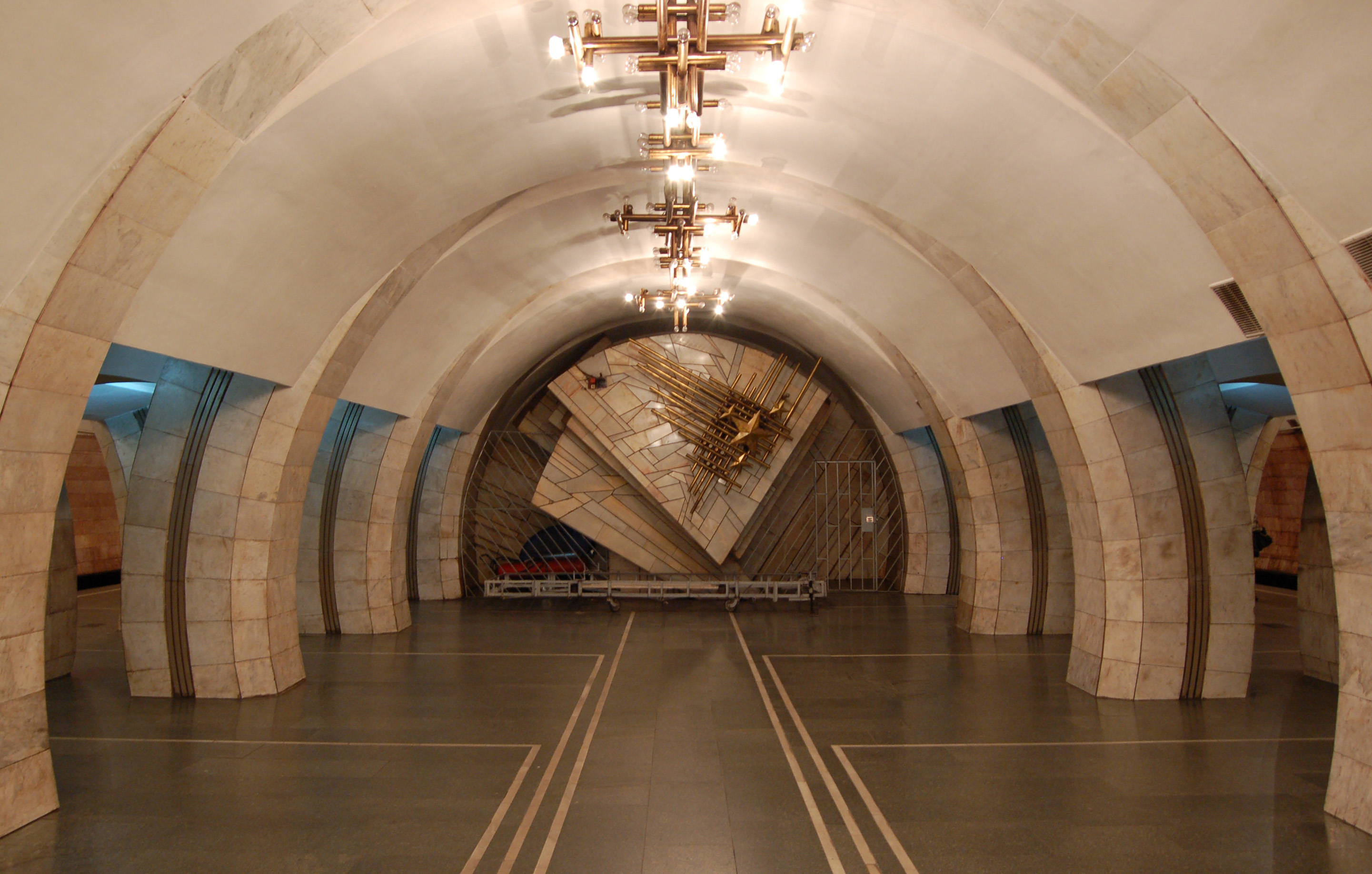
- The Station Hall; Soviet decorative piece at the end of the hall will be transferred to a museum in accordance with the 2015 decommunization laws

General information
- Location: Holosiivskyi District; Kyiv; Ukraine
- Coordinates: 50°24′47″N 30°31′28″E
- System: Kyiv Metro station
- Line: Obolonsko–Teremkivska line

Construction
- Structure type: Deep column station
- Depth: 22.5 m (74 ft)

Other information
- Station code: 221

History
- Opened: 30 December 1984
- Former names: Dzerzhynska

Passengers
- 2011: 28,500 (daily)

Services
Preceding station	Kyiv Metro	Following station
Palats Ukraina towards Heroiv Dnipra	Obolonsko–Teremkivska line	Demiivska towards Teremky
Location

Lybidska (Ukrainian: Либідська,) is the 27th station of the Kyiv Metro system that serves the Ukrainian capital Kyiv. The station was opened as part of the Obolonsko–Teremkivska Line on 30 December 1984, located between the Palats "Ukrayina" and Demiivska stations.

The station provides passenger access to Lybdiska Square, under which it is located. It served as the line's southern terminus for 26 years until 2010, when the line was extended to Vasylkivska. After the fall of Soviet Union in the early 1990s, the station was renamed "Lybidska" after a nearby river—Lybid, on 2 February 1993.

In 2011, the station was listed as a "newly discovered object of cultural heritage," and monuments of architecture, town planning, and art. In May 2016, it was decided that the Soviet decorative piece at the end of the central hall would be removed to be displayed at a museum in accordance with the 2015 decommunization laws.

As of 2011, Lybidska has a daily ridership of 28,500, and is operational every day from 05:48 to 00:00.

== Construction ==
Originally, a metro station was not planned for this area, since there were no large residential neighborhoods or important transport interchanges nearby. During the planning process, the station bore the name "Ploshcha Dzerzhynskoho" or "Zavod Imeni Dzerzhynskoho," referring to the nearby square and industrial plant, the name was finally shortened to Dzerzhynska (Ukrainian: Дзержинська). All the names commemorated Felix Dzerzhynsky, a communist politician of the Soviet Union.

The station was built as a temporary terminus, owing to the complexity of the hydro-geological situation in the area that would become the Holosiivska extension of the Obolonsko–Teremkivska Line. The line's extension southwards lasted more than 15 years and became a major issue for commuters during rush hours. The station was one of the busiest terminus stations since many bus and marshrutka routes were routed nearby, connecting commuters with areas on the outskirts of Kyiv which were lacking metro access. When the Holosiivska extension was inaugurated on 15 December 2010, the station ceased to be a terminus.

== Design ==
Lybidska was designed by a team of architects including Valentyn Ezhov, Anatoliy Krushynskyi, Tamara Tselikovska, Oleksiy Panchenko, in addition to artists Ernest Kotkov, Nikolai Bartossik. Prior to its renaming, the station featured a large bas-relief by M. Vronsky depicting Dzerzhinsky himself, although this was removed shortly after the station was renamed.

Located at a depth of 25 metres underground, Lybidska was designed as a deep column station that features three separate halls —a central hall, and two platform halls— which are separated from each other by a row of columns. The row of columns in the station is unique in that it was designed as a double row, leaving an empty space in between each of the two rows. The station does not have a ground-level vestibule on Lybidska Square and there is only one exit, which is connected to the station's central hall by an escalator tunnel.

== Gallery ==
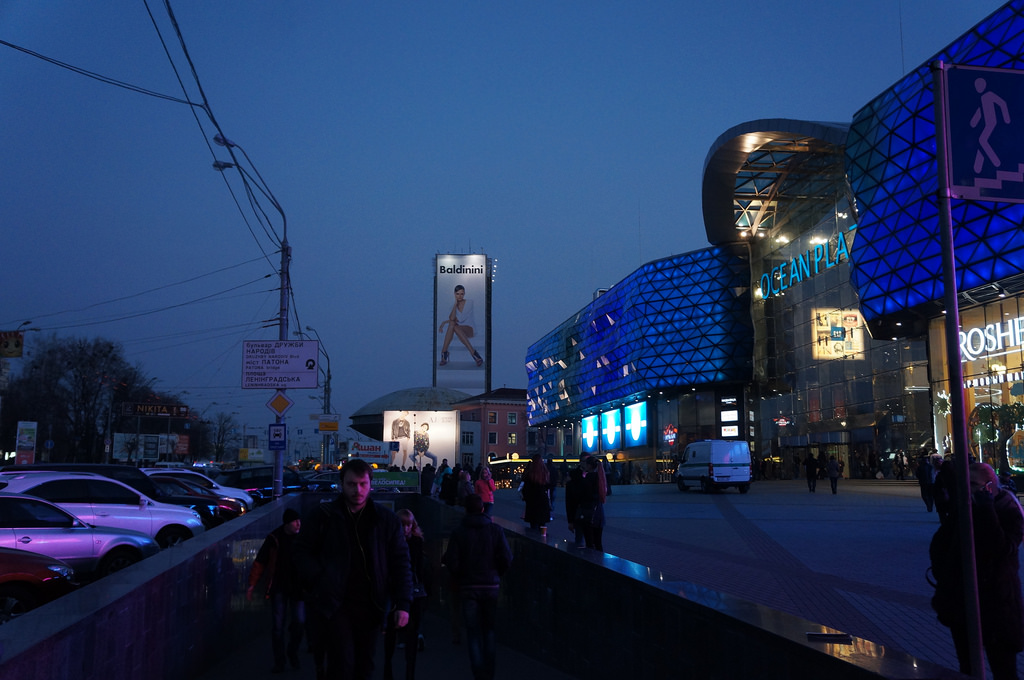
Station entrance

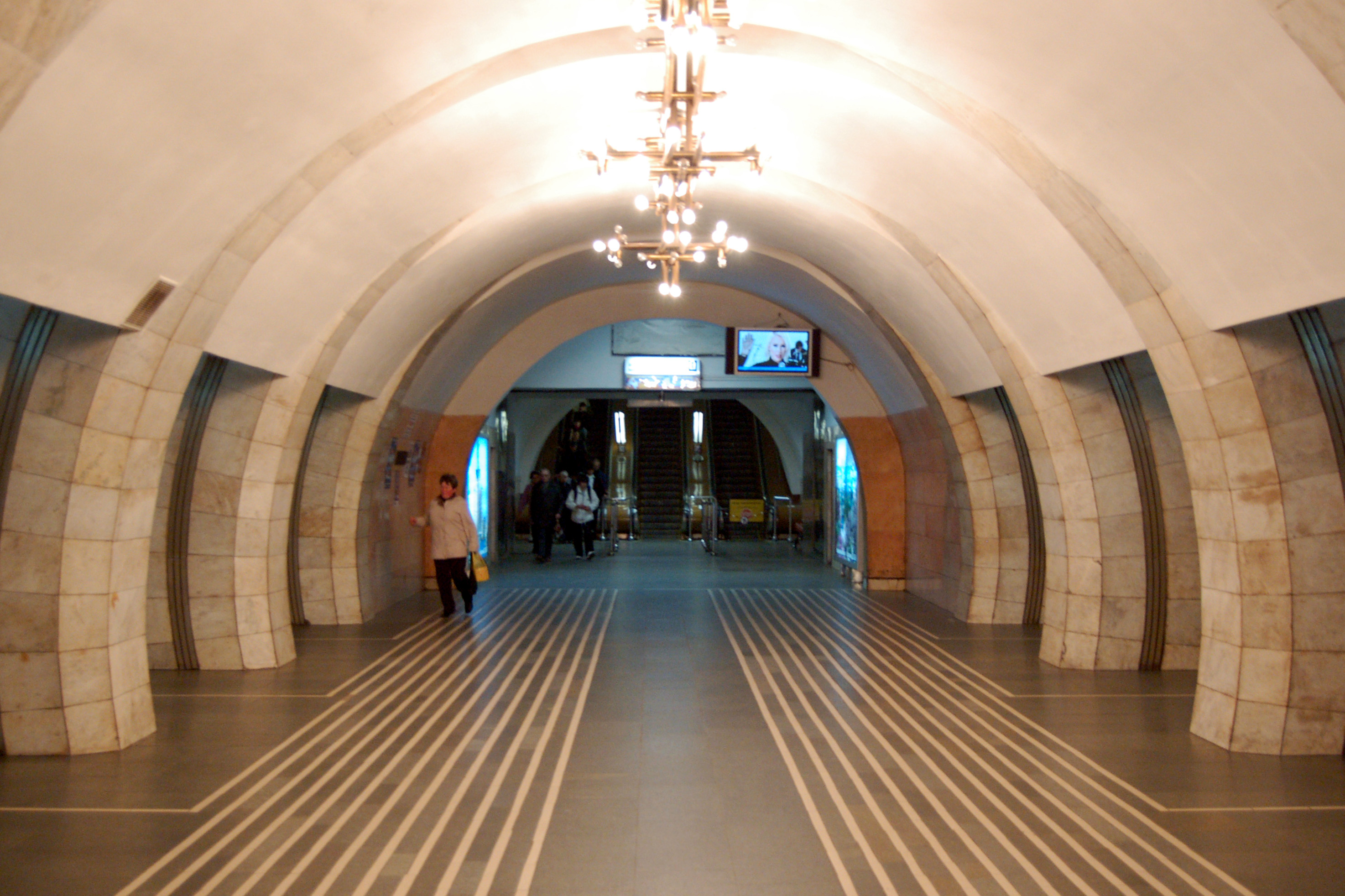
View from the central hall towards the station's escalator tunnel.

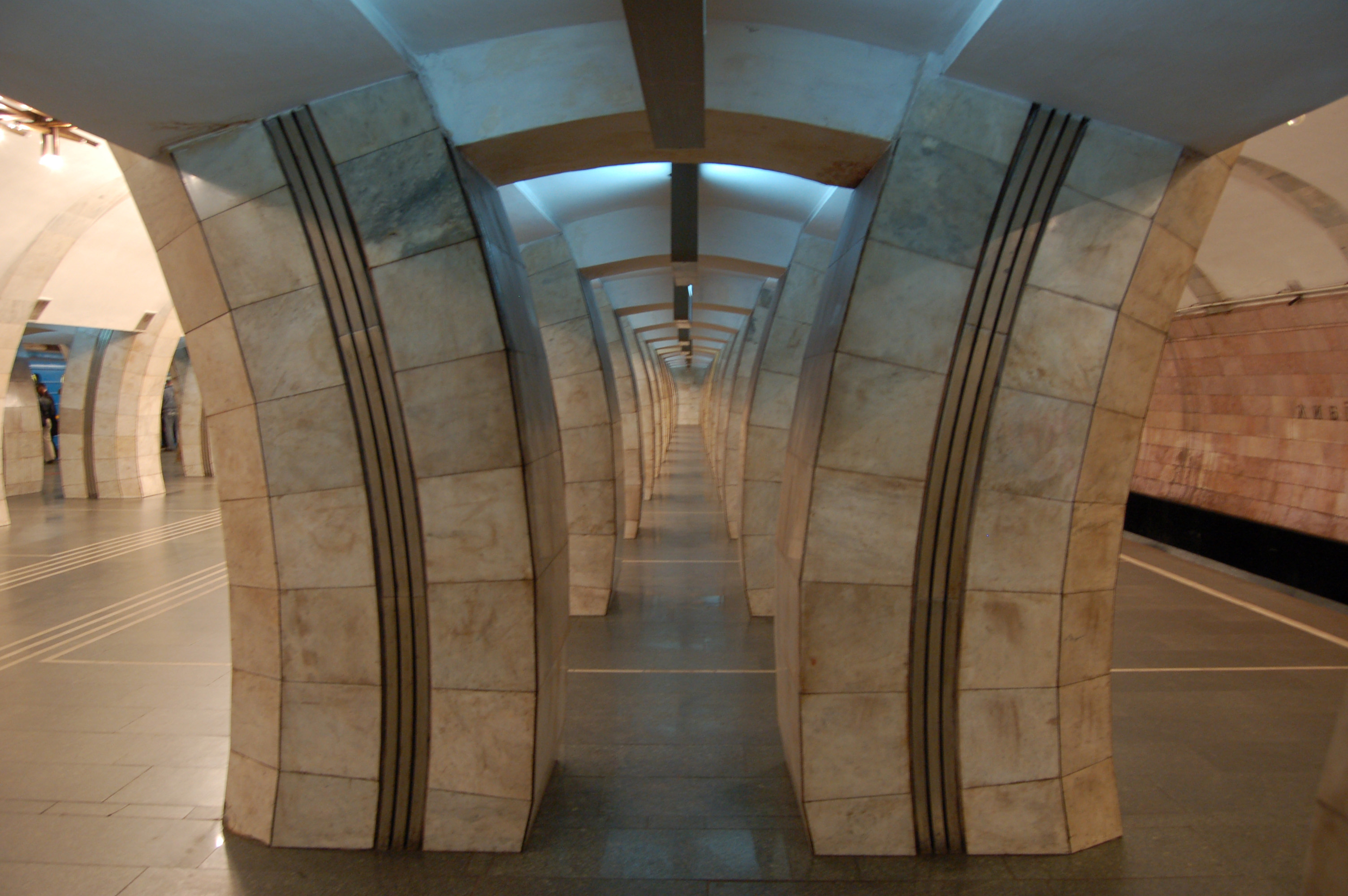
The three station halls are separated by a double row of columns, featuring a walkway in between the two rows.

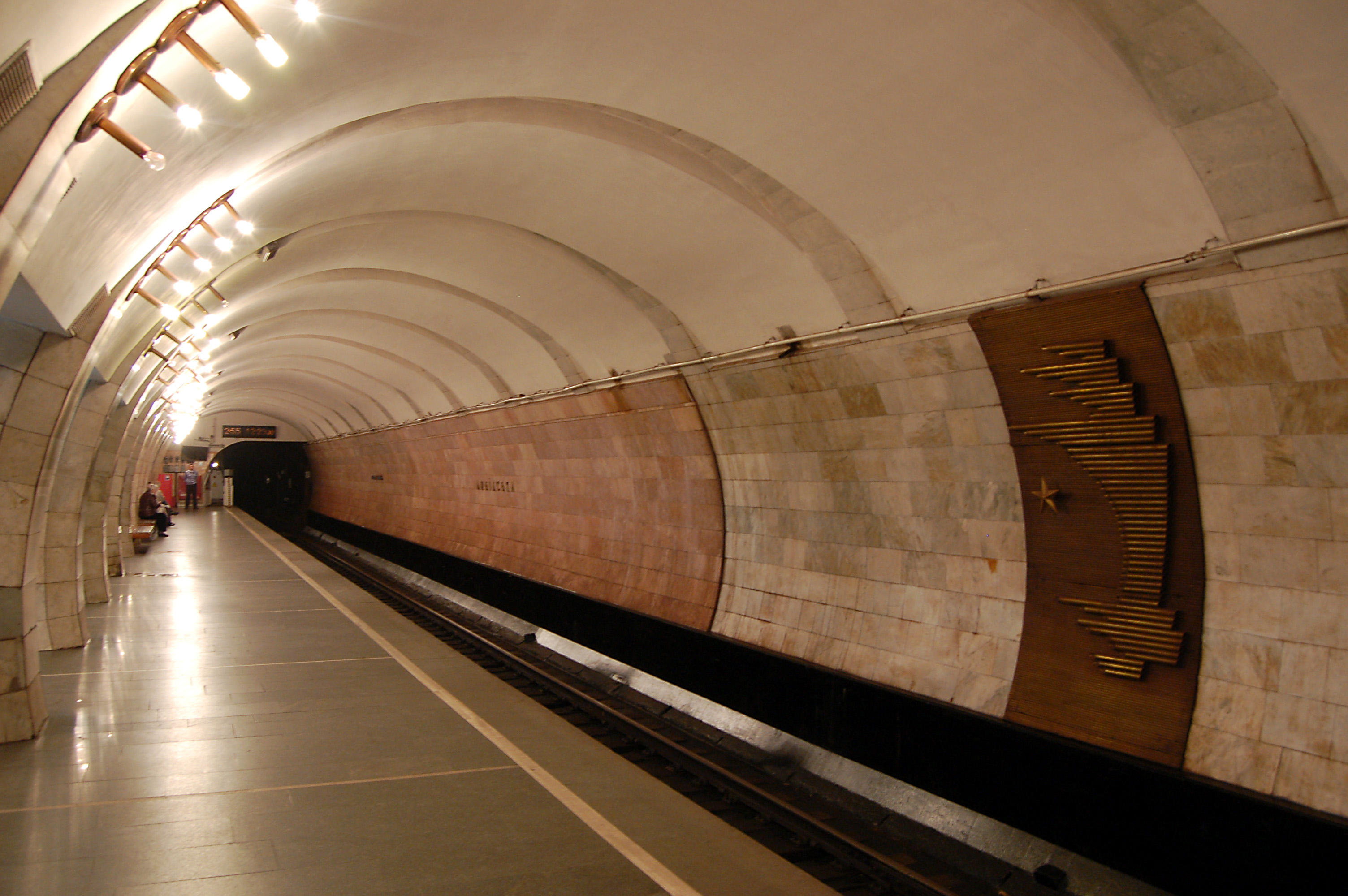
The station platform, with decorative piece seen on the far right.

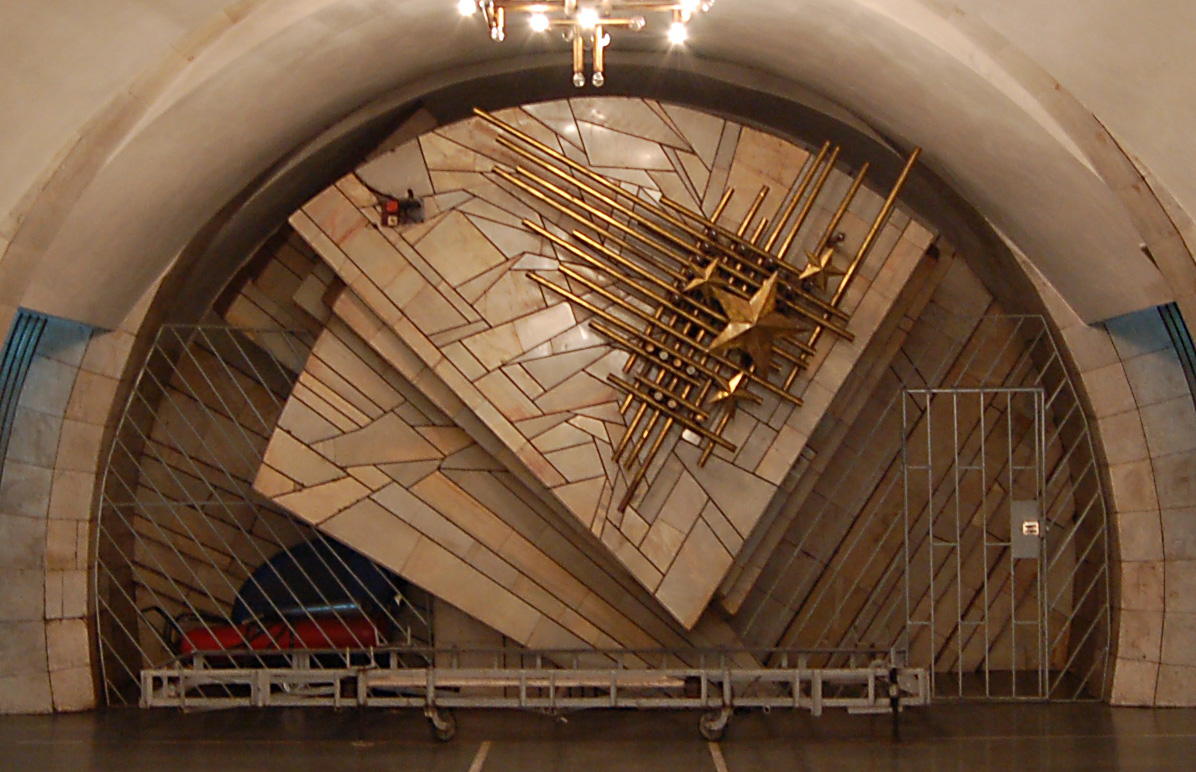
Decorative piece at the end of the central hall; due to be removed due to 2015 decommunization laws.
See more on the Wikimedia Commons

Preceded by None	Obolonsko–Teremkivska line terminus December 30, 1984 – December 15, 2010	Succeeded by Vasylkivska
