= Vasylkivska (Kyiv Metro) =

Kyiv Metro Station

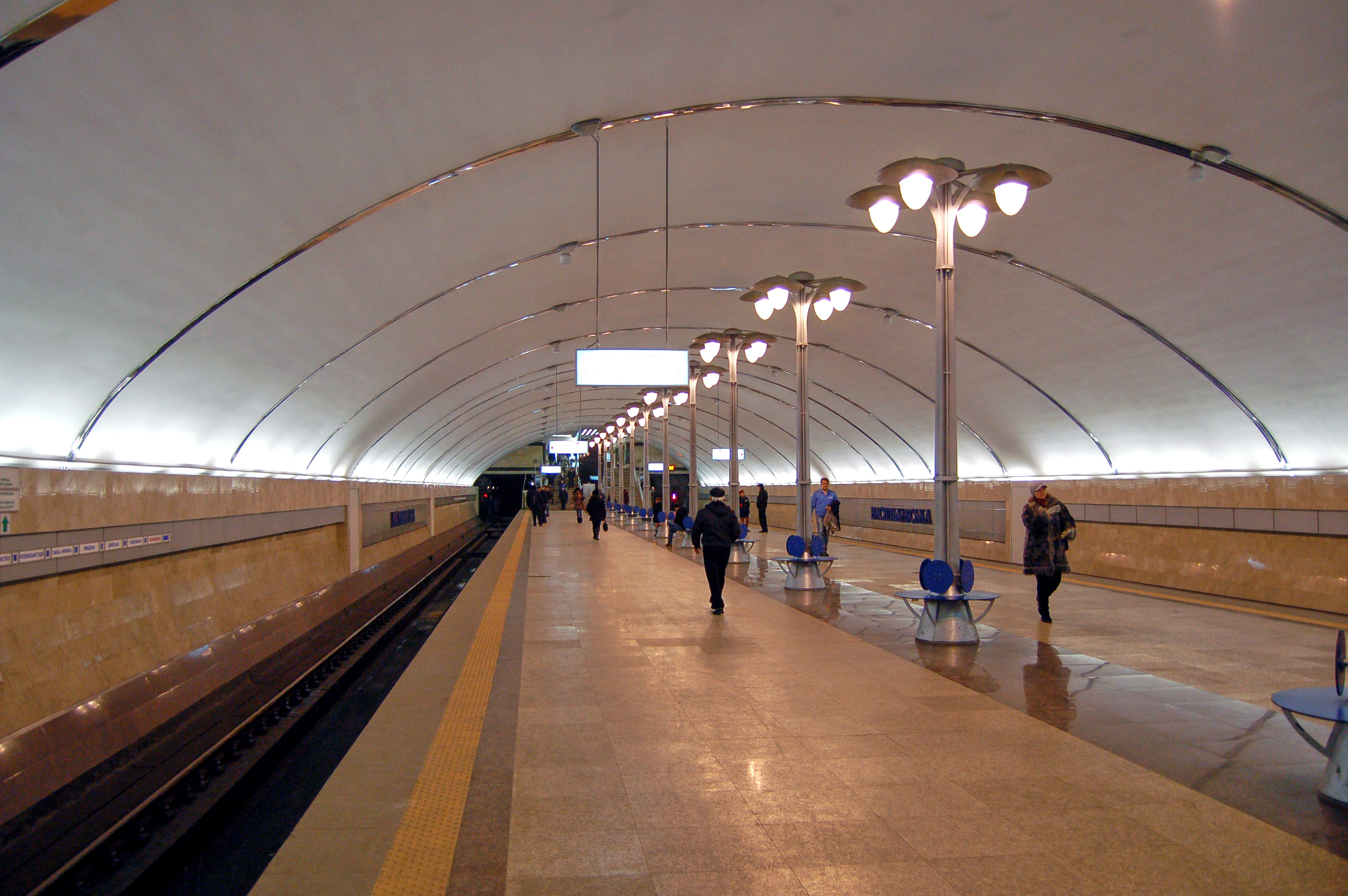

General information
- Location: Holosiivskyi District; Kyiv; Ukraine
- Coordinates: 50°23′36″N 30°29′17″E
- System: Kyiv Metro station
- Owner: Kyiv Metro
- Line: Obolonsko–Teremkivska line
- Platforms: 2
- Tracks: 2

Construction
- Structure type: underground
- Platform levels: 1

Other information
- Station code: 224

History
- Opened: 15 December 2010

Services
Preceding station	Kyiv Metro	Following station
Holosiivska towards Heroiv Dnipra	Obolonsko–Teremkivska line	Vystavkovyi Tsentr towards Teremky
Location

Vasylkivska (Ukrainian: Васильківська,) is a station on the Kyiv Metro's Obolonsko–Teremkivska Line. It is named after the street which leads to Vasylkiv, south-west to capital Kyiv. The station was opened on 15 December 2010.

== History ==
The station was planned to open late 2008. This was later rescheduled to March 2009. It was again postponed to Independence Day August 2009. On 12 May 2010, it was announced the station was expected to open by the end of 2010. The first trial run of a train took place on 5 November.

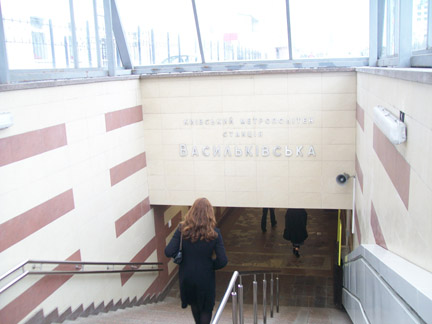
Vasylkivska Metro Entrance
