= Obolonsko–Teremkivska line =

Kyiv Metro line

Overview
- Locale: Kyiv, Ukraine
- Termini: Heroiv Dnipra; Teremky
- Stations: 18

Service
- Type: Rapid transit
- System: Kyiv Metro
- Operator(s): Kyivskyi Metropoliten

History
- Opened: 17 December 1976; 49 years ago
- Last extension: 2003

Technical
- Line length: 20.95 km (13.02 mi)
- Track gauge: 1,520 mm (4 ft 11 27/32 in)
- Electrification: 825 V DC (third rail)

The map of the Kyiv Metro system. Sviatoshynsko–Brovarska line Obolonsko–Teremkivska line Syretsko–Pecherska line Podilsko–Vyhurivska line Livoberezhna line

The Obolonsko–Teremkivska line (Ukrainian: Оболонсько-Теремківська лінія, Obolons'ko-Teremkivs'ka liniia), is the second line of the Kyiv Metro system that serves Kyiv, the capital of Ukraine. First opened in 1976, the line extended northwards along the right bank of the Dnieper river and began deviating from the river towards the southwest. As the current stations were built in the 1970s and 1980s, architecturally the line shows some of the best examples of late-Soviet architectural features. It is generally coloured blue on the maps.

== Stations ==
1. Heroiv Dnipra
2. Minska
3. Obolon
4. Pochaina
5. Tarasa Shevchenka
6. Kontraktova Ploshcha
7. Poshtova Ploshcha
8. Maidan Nezalezhnosti → Khreshchatyk
9. Ploshcha Ukrainskykh Heroiv → Palats Sportu
10. Olimpiiska
11. Palats Ukraina
12. Lybidska
13. Demiivska
14. Holosiivska
15. Vasylkivska
16. Vystavkovyi Tsentr
17. Ipodrom
18. Teremky

== Timeline ==
Segment	Date opened	Length
Maidan Nezalezhnosti, Poshtova Ploshcha, Kontraktova Ploshcha	17 December 1976	2.32 km
Tarasa Shevchenka, Pochaina, Obolon	19 December 1980	4.40 km
Ploshcha Ukrainskykh Heroiv, Olimpiiska	19 December 1981	1.70 km
Minska, Heroiv Dnipra	6 November 1982	2.35 km
Palats Ukraina, Lybidska	30 December 1984	2.43 km
Demiivska, Holosiivska, Vasylkivska	15 December 2010	3.80 km
Vystavkovyi Tsentr	27 December 2011	1.48 km
Ipodrom	25 October 2012	0.92 km
Teremky	6 November 2013	1.50 km
Total:	18 stations	20.95 km

== Name changes ==
Station	Previous name(s)	Years
Maidan Nezalezhnosti	Ploshcha Kalinina	1976–1977
Maidan Nezalezhnosti	Ploshcha Zhovtnevoii Revolutsii	1977–1991
Kontraktova Ploshcha	Chervona Ploshcha	1976–1990
Obolon	Prospekt Korniichuka	1980–1990
Palats Ukraina	Chervonoarmiiska	1984–1993
Lybidska	Dzerzhynska	1984–1993
Olimpiiska	Respublikanskyi Stadion	1981–2011
Pochaina	Petrivka	1980–2018
Ploshcha Ukrainskykh Heroiv	Ploshcha Lva Tolstoho	1981–2023

Until February 2018 the metro line was named Kurenivsko-Chervonoarmiiska.

== Transfers ==
#	Transfer to	At
	Sviatoshynsko–Brovarska line	Maidan Nezalezhnosti
	Syretsko–Pecherska line	Ploshcha Ukrainskykh Heroiv

== Rolling stock ==
The line is served by the Obolon (#2) depot. Presently 32 five-carriage trains are assigned to it. Most of them are of type 81-717/714 and 81-717.5/714.5 built during the late 1970s and the 1980s. In 2007 new type 81-540.2K/541.2K, which is an advancement of type 81-717/714, went into service on the line. In 2002 a train of type 81-553.1/554.1/555.1 (Slavutich), which is a variant of the 81-71M in Prague metro, went into service on the line and it's the only train in the entire Kyiv metro.

== Recent developments and future plans ==
A major extension of the line to the southwestern regions of Holosiiv and Teremky has long been planned since the 1980s, however due to the difficult conditions under the Lybid River and financial shortages, all work was frozen in the early 1990s and the completed sections were flooded.

Resumed in 2002, the project will conclude of seven stations and were finished by 2020. Demiivska, Holosiivska and Vasylkivska were opened 15 December 2010; after a delay of two years because of lack of funds. Vystakovyi Tsentr was opened 27 December 2011. The second stage included the stations Ipodrom and Teremky which brought the line along the Akademika Glushkova avenue past the Kyiv Ring Road. Initially planned opening for these two was foreseen for 2012; but Ipodrom was opened on 25 October 2012 and Teremky was opened on 6 November 2013.

The final stage may finish with the station Odeska and a new depot nearby. A considered option is a two station branch after Ipodrom northwards to two further stations: Avtovokzal Teremky and Vulytsia Kreisera Avrory.

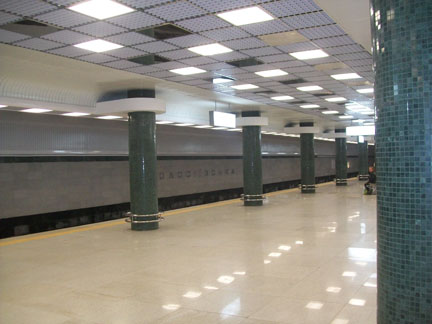
Holosiivska station
