= Olimpiiska (Kyiv Metro) =

Kyiv Metro Station

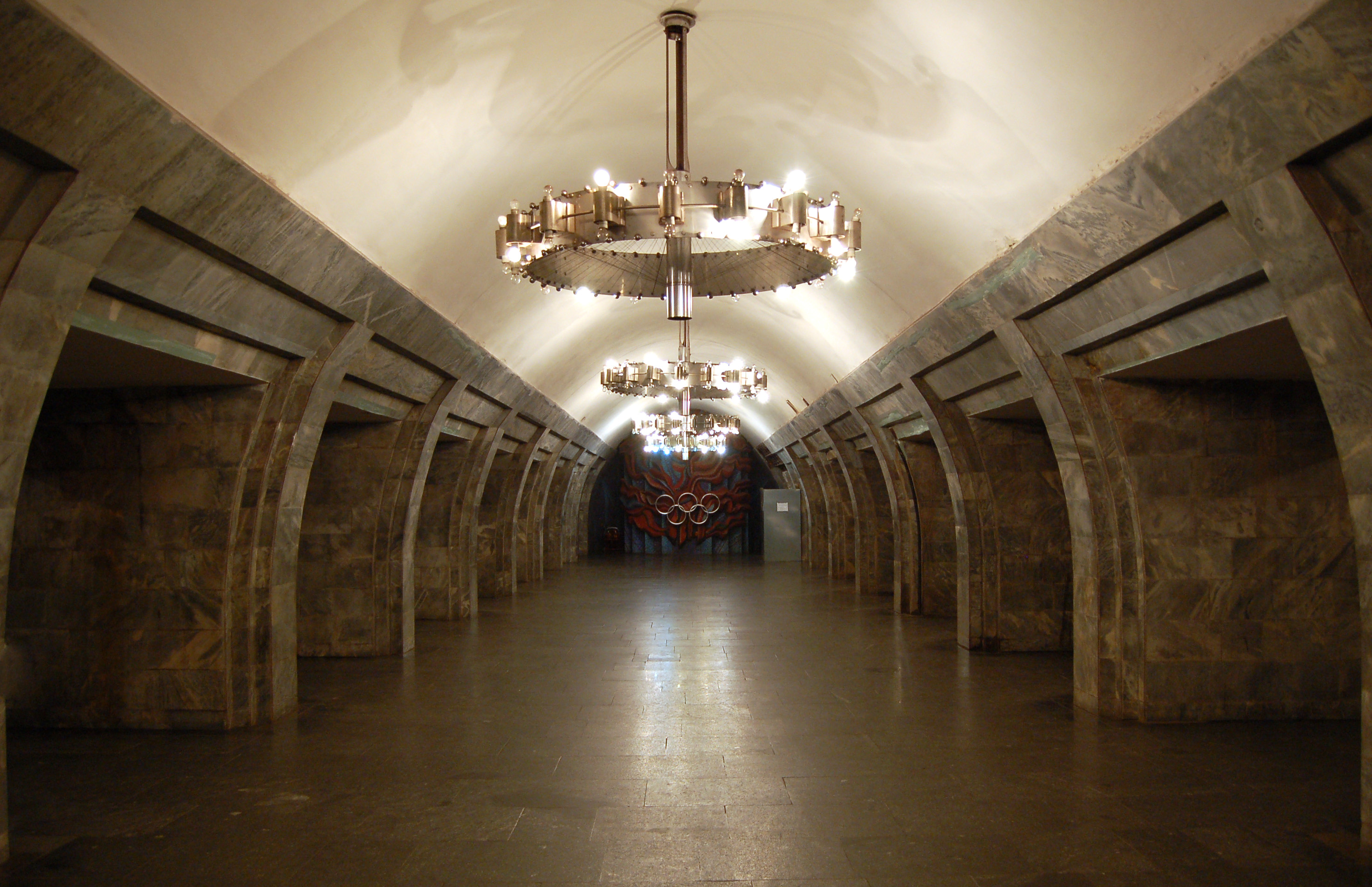
- The Station Hall

General information
- Location: Pecherskyi District; Kyiv; Ukraine
- Coordinates: 50°25′56″N 30°30′58″E
- System: Kyiv Metro station
- Owner: Kyiv Metro
- Line: Obolonsko–Teremkivska line
- Platforms: 2
- Tracks: 2

Construction
- Structure type: underground
- Platform levels: 1

Other information
- Station code: 219

History
- Opened: 19 December 1981
- Former names: Respublikansky Stadion

Services
Preceding station	Kyiv Metro	Following station
Ploshcha Ukrainskykh Heroiv towards Heroiv Dnipra	Obolonsko–Teremkivska line	Palats Ukraina towards Teremky
Location

Olimpiiska (Ukrainian: Олімпійська,) is a station on the Obolonsko–Teremkivska Line of the Kyiv Metro system that serves the Ukrainian capital Kyiv. It was opened on 19 December 1981, and was originally named after Kyiv's Republican Stadium as Respublikanskyi Stadion (Ukrainian: Республіканський Стадіон; Russian: Республиканский стадион). It was designed by A.S. Krushynskyi, T.A. Tselikovska, A.S. Andriienko, and Y.M. Sharanevych.

The station is built deep underground and consists of a central hall with arcades leading toward the station platforms. The walls have been covered with grey marble and the lighting comes from chandeliers. On a wall at the end of the central hall, are the Olympic rings, commemorating the 1980 Summer Olympics. The station is accessible by passenger tunnels on the Velyka Vasylkivska and another street.
