= Olga Anatoliivna Holubovska =

Ukrainian infectious disease specialist

Holubovska Olga Anatoliivna — Ukrainian infectious disease specialist, Doctor of medical sciences (2009), professor (2014), Honored Doctor of Ukraine (2017), Head of the Department of Infectious Diseases of the Bogomolets National Medical University (since 2009), chief non-staff specialist of the Ministry of Health of Ukraine in the specialty "infectious diseases" (2011–2016). On December 2, 2021, at the 10th Congress of Infectious Disease Specialists of Ukraine, she was elected president of the Public Organization "All-Ukrainian Association of Infectious Disease Specialists".

== Biography ==
In 1991, she graduated from the Kyiv Medical Institute with a degree in Infectious Diseases.

From 1991 to 1992, she studied at the Department of Infectious Diseases of Bogomolets National Medical University. From 1992 to 1993, she worked as an infectious disease specialist at the Oleksandrivska Clinical Hospital in Kyiv.

Since 1993, she has been working at the Department of Infectious Diseases of Bogomolets National Medical University: 1993–2005 — Assistant; 2005–2009 — Associate professor; since 2009 - the Head of the department.

Since June 1, 2020, he has been a member of the working group for the development of medical protocols for providing medical assistance to patients with the coronavirus disease (COVID-19).

She is one of the main founders of the introduction in Ukraine for Ukrainian citizens the State program for the treatment of patients with viral hepatitis B and C, which has been successfully implemented since the beginning of 2014. She is also one of the founders of the implementation in Ukraine of the European Union plan for the elimination of the hepatitis C virus in Europe.

== Honors ==
- In 2016, she was awarded the medal of the Kyiv Patriarchate "For sacrifice and love for Ukraine".
- On January 24, 2020, it was introduced to the operational headquarters to prevent the introduction and spread of cases of diseases caused by the new coronavirus detected in the city of Wuhan (Hubei province, China) on the territory of Ukraine.
- On February 21, 2020, she was appointed a member of the temporary working group on reforming the Health care system of Ukraine.
- On April 24, 2020, she was awarded the medal of the WTO "Order of Honor and Service" for selfless work in the fight against the 2019 coronavirus pandemic.
- On June 16, 2020, she was awarded the Order of the Holy Equal-to-the-Apostles Princess Olga of the Ukrainian Orthodox Church for services to the UOC.
- On June 19, 2020, she was awarded the State Award of Ukraine with the Order of Princess Olga III degree.

== See also ==
- Bogomolets National Medical University
- Infectious Diseases
