= Isaac Trachtenberg =

Ukrainian and Soviet hygienist (1923–2023)

- Ісаак Михайлович Трахтенберг
- Born: 11 November 1923; Zhytomyr, Volhynian Governorate, Ukrainian SSR, Soviet Union
- Died: 27 January 2023 (aged 99); Kyiv, Ukraine
- Citizenship: Ukraine
- Education: Kyiv Medical Institute

Isaac Mykhailovych Trachtenberg (Ukrainian: Ісаак Михайлович Трахтенберг; 11 November 1923 – 27 January 2023) was a Ukrainian hygienist, Professor, MD, a corresponding member of the National Academy of Sciences of Ukraine (1992), academician of the Bogomolets National Medical University, Honored Worker of Science and Technology of Ukraine (1994), winner of the state Prize of Ukraine (2002). Bogomolets (2010, academic awards for Preventive Medicine of the National Academy of Medical Sciences of Ukraine (1995, 2002, 2010).

== Biography ==
=== Birth and early years ===
Trachtenberg was born on 11 November 1923 in Zhytomyr. In 1940 he graduated from the Kiev school no. 44. In 1940 he was a student of the philological faculty of Kyiv State University.

From 1941, he studied at the Kyiv Medical Institute. In 1942, he combined his studies at the institute with his work as a toolmaker in "Chelyabenergomontazhe" in the construction of the plant's defense industry. At the same time, he took a 110-hour VSL-1 training.

In 1943, he was elected as chairman of the student union of the Kiev Medical Institute. For active public work he was awarded the diploma of the Chelyabinsk Council of People's Deputies.

In 1944, he returned to Kiev with a team of students and teachers of the institute, where he continued his studies. Two years later, he graduated from the Kiev Medical Institute, and was enrolled in graduate school in the competition at the Department of Occupational Health, headed by Lev Ivanovich Medved. In 1947-1948 he participated in the first post-war scientific forums in Preventive Medicine (XII All-Union Congress of the Ukrainian and V hygienists, epidemiologists, microbiologists, infectious disease). In 1948, the Republican anti-epidemic commission was appointed commissioner for conducting control activities Railway district of Kiev. In the same year he was awarded the medal "For Valiant Labor in the Great Patriotic War of 1941-1945".

== Scientific activities ==
In 1951, Trachtenberg was awarded the scientific degree of candidate of medical sciences, and he was enrolled as Assistant Department of Occupational Health Kiev Medical Institute. From 1951 to 1955, he worked as an assistant to the department. In his role as professor, which in those years led a member of the Academy of Medical Sciences Hayk Khachaturovich Shahbazian, Trachtenberg served until 1972 and during that time has published three monographs, one of which is devoted to mercury poisoning, the second - Toxicology of polymers, the third - physiology of mental labor.

In 1956, Trachtenberg was awarded the academic title of associate professor and in 1961 he was elected a chairman of the union of the Kiev Medical Institute. Already in 1964, he was awarded the academic degree of doctor of medical sciences. Two years later, in 1966 Trachtenberg was awarded the medal "For the defense of Kiev" and in the same year he received the title of professor. In 1968 he was awarded the diploma of the Presidium of the Ukrainian national committee of the union of medical workers, and then in 1970 Certificate of Merit Executive Committee of Kyiv City Council of People's Deputies. In 1972, Trachtenberg, was elected head of the Laboratory of Industrial Toxicology and Occupational Health for the use of chemicals Kyiv Research Institute of Hygiene and Occupational Diseases Ministry of Health of Ukraine. He also became a member of the Industrial Toxicology Section of the Problem Commission "Scientific basis of health and occupational diseases," Academy of Medical Sciences.

== Publications ==
=== Editor ===
- A member of the editorial board of the periodical "Literature and Life";
- Member of Editorial Board (section "Hygiene"), Great Medical Encyclopedia.

=== Books ===
- In 2006 at the International Scientific Conference "Scientific schools of the National Medical University. Bogomoletz: from the beginnings to the present "was the presentation of the book, I. Trachtenberg, entitled "The Word of the Alma mate"».

=== Other publications ===
He was actively published in the newspapers: "The Mirror of the week", "Day", "Pravda Ukrainy", "Medical Newspaper" (Moscow), "Your Health Protection" (Kyiv), "Health Protection of Ukraine" (Kyiv) "Doctor" (Kyiv), "Mistetstvo lіkuvannya" (Kyiv), "Rainbow" (Kyiv).

== Awards ==
- Letter of the Chelyabinsk Council of People's Deputies for their participation in the training of trainers Osoviahima FPSOs.
- Medal "For Valiant Labour in the Great Patriotic War 1941–1945"
- Medal "For defense of Kiev"
- Diploma of the Presidium of the Ukrainian national committee of the union of health workers (1968)
- Diploma of the Executive Committee of Kyiv City Council of People's Deputies (1970)
- Diploma of USSR Ministry of Health and the Ukrainian national committee of the union of health workers in connection with the 125th anniversary of the Kiev Medical Institute. (1976)
- Diploma of National Board of Scientific Society of Hygienists (1980)
- The sign "Excellent Health" (1982)
- Medal "Veteran of Labor" (1985)
- Breast Badge "50 years of the heroic defense of Kiev" (1991)
- Diploma of public charity fund "Professional" for participation in the aftermath of the Chernobyl accident.
- Order "For merits» III degree (1998)
- Academic Award of the Academy of Medical Sciences of Ukraine on preventive medicine for the monograph "The main indicators of physiological norm in man" (2002)
- Medal of the Academy of Medical Sciences for outstanding achievements in the field of medicine in connection with the 10th anniversary of the Academy of Medical Sciences of Ukraine (2003)
