= Trolleybuses in Kyiv =

Trolleybus system in Ukraine

Kyiv Trolleybus
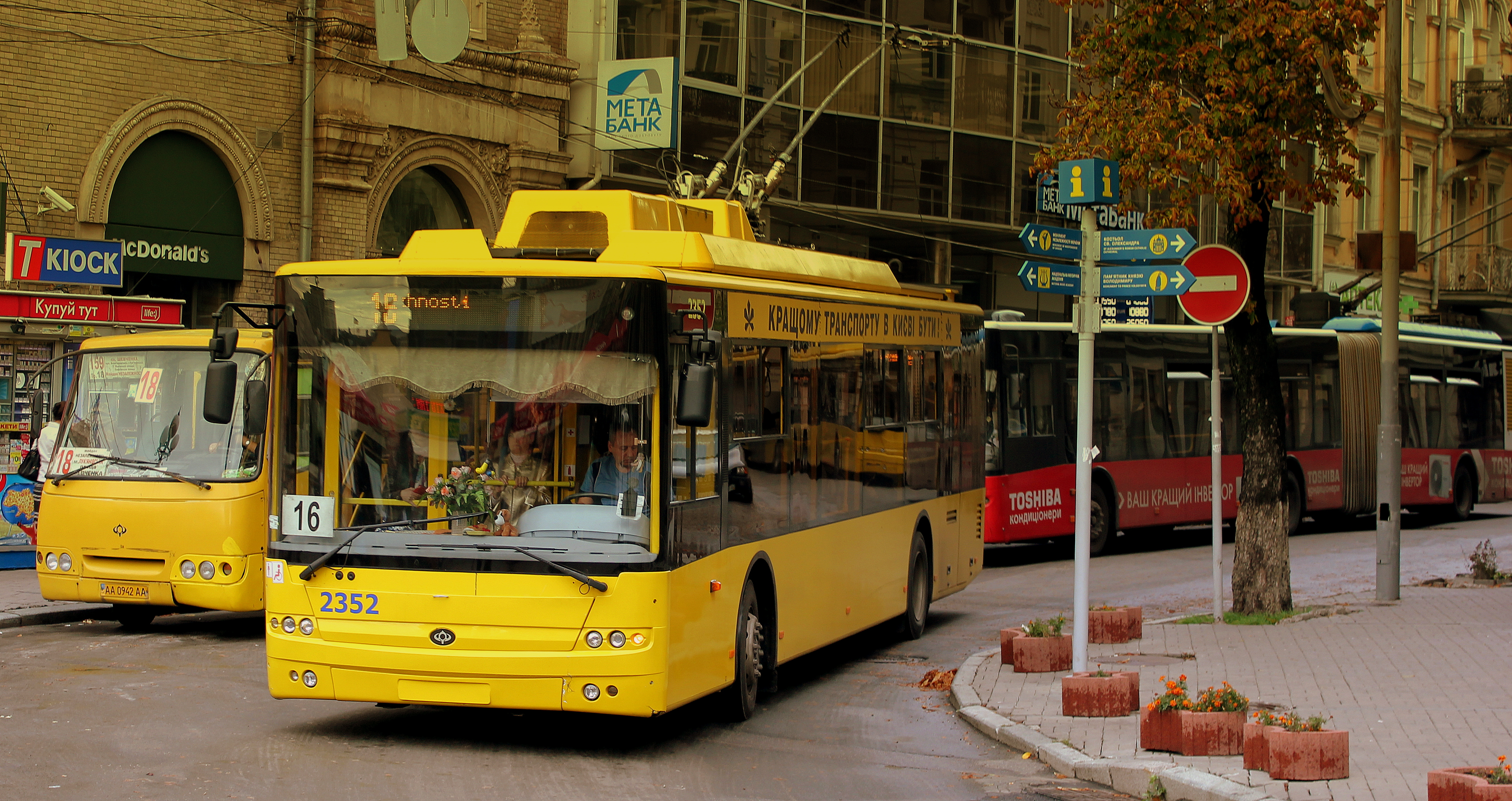

Overview
- Native name: Київський Тролейбус
- Owner: Kyivpastrans, Kyiv City Council
- Area served: Darnytsia Raion, Desna Raion, Dnipro Raion, Holosiiv Raion, Obolon Raion, Pechersk Raion, Podil Raion, Shevchenko Raion, Solomianka Raion, Sviatoshyn Raion
- Locale: Kyiv
- Number of lines: 48
- Annual ridership: 164,325,700 (2016)
- Website: kpt.kyiv.ua

Operation
- Began operation: November 5, 1935
- Number of vehicles: 629

Technical
- System length: 496 kilometres (308 mi) (2019)
System map
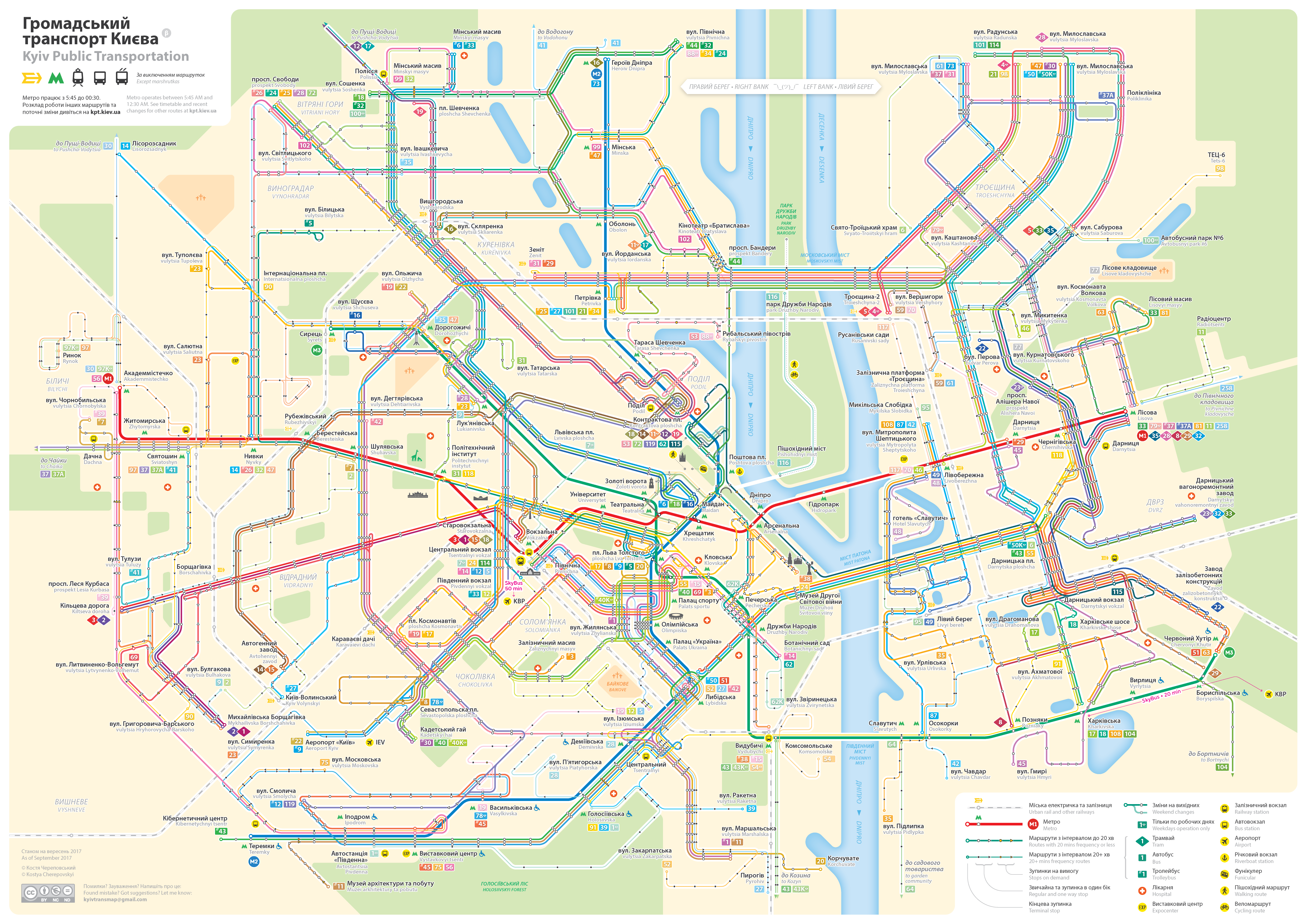

The Kyiv Trolleybus is a trolleybus network in Kyiv, the largest trolleybus network in the world in terms of line length, and the largest in Ukraine in terms of length and number of cars. The network was opened on November 5, 1935.

== History ==
=== Pre-History ===
In June 1914, a London firm proposed to Kyiv Mayor I. M. Dyakov to build a "railless" tram (of course, this was a trolleybus). It was said that the construction of a trolleybus will cost 5 times cheaper (although funds for road repairs and asphalt were not taken into account). But due to lack of experience with such lines and the war, the talk of a trolleybus in Kyiv began only in 1935, after the transfer of the capital of the Ukrainian SSR from Kharkiv. According to the first project, the trolleybus was to follow the route of the former tram No 2, via III International Square – Khreshchatyk – Lenina Street – Pirohova Street – Tarasa Shevchenka Boulevard – Cominterna Street – Railway Terminal. Then a delegation was sent to Moscow. The issue with the supply of rolling stock was resolved; Moscow agreed to send the carcass of the trolleybuses, and Kyiv had to assemble them at the Dombalya Plant (now KZET). Routes were to open on the anniversary of the October Revolution, but numerous changes to the project caused delays.

=== Before World War II ===
The first trolleybus line in Kyiv and Ukraine (the second in the USSR) was opened on November 5, 1935, at 5:00 pm. The one-way fare was 25 kopecks. 4 LK-5 trolleybuses were on the route: Dombalya Plant – Krasnoarmeyska Street – Lva Tolstoho Square – Krasnoarmeyska Street – Dombal Plant. At the same time, a trolleybus depot for 100 vehicles was located on the territory of the plant, which served as one of the final ones. At the end of 1935, it was promised to open the second stage of the trolleybus system. From Lva Tolstoho Square, the trolleybus was to be extended along Khreshchatyk, Lenina Street, Pirohivska Street, Shevchenko Boulevard, and Cominterna Street to the railway station. It is true that they did not meet the deadline, but on June 2, 1936, from 19:00, citizens already had the opportunity to take a trolleybus to the railway station.

At the beginning of 1937, the first trolleybuses manufactured by YAZ (Yaroslavl Automobile Plant) arrived in Kyiv. They were named YATB-1. This allowed to increase the production on the already existing route and to provide rolling stock on the lines that were to open this year. However, due to the fact that trolleybuses were made quickly, factory defects had to be eliminated already in Kyiv. For the first time, every second trolleybus broke down on the route every day. Subsequently, trolleybuses of the YATB-2 type began to arrive. They were of better quality, so a certain problem with the rolling stock was resolved, given the following changes in traffic.

On October 5, 1937, the third stage was completed. It ran from the Bessarabka to the III International Square, thus the trolleybus completely covered Khreschatyk and tram lines closed in 1934. Due to this branching of lines, trolleybuses could no longer run on a single line, so they were divided into routes:

- 1 Railway Station – Cominterna Street – Tarasa Shevchenka Boulevard – Pirohova Street – Lenina Street – Khreshchatyk – Krasnoarmeyska Street – Dzerzhinsky Plant
- 2 Railway Station – Cominterna Street – Tarasa Shevchenka Boulevard – Pirohova Street – Lenina Street – Khreshchatyk – III International Square
- 3 III International Square – Khreshchatyk – Krasnoarmeyska Street – Dzerzhinsky Plant

Already at the beginning of 1939, the capital of the Ukrainian SSR received the newest trolleybuses at that time – YATB-4. They differed from their predecessors in power. There were enough new trolleybuses in the city, which allowed to transfer LK-5 to the official balance.

Due to the high intensity of the area from III International Square to Lva Tolstoho Square, on September 18, 1940, an additional route was introduced, No 4: Lva Tolstoho Square – Khreshchatyk – III International Square. There were 4 trolleybuses on the line. It was planned to extend the network from Khreshchatyk to Podil (Volodymyrsky Descent) and to Pechersk (Kirova Street). But the trolleybuses at the time could not cope with such steep slopes, so the projects were rejected.

Thus, as of January 1, 1941, the route network looked like this:

- 1 Railway Station – Cominterna Street – Tarasa Shevchenka Boulevard – Pirohova Street – Lenina Street – Khreshchatyk – Krasnoarmeyska Street – Dzerzhinsky Plant
- 2 Railway Station – Cominterna Street – Tarasa Shevchenka Boulevard – Pirohova Street – Lenina Street – Khreshchatyk – III International Square
- 3 III International Square – Khreshchatyk – Krasnoarmeyska Street – Dzerzhinsky Plant
- 4 III International Square – Khreshchatyk – Lva Tolstoho Square

=== During World War II ===
For a long time, after the invasion of German troops in the USSR, the trolleybus system did not stop working. But after Soviet troops withdrew from Kyiv on September 18, 1941, they de-energized the city by blowing up power plants. Some eyewitnesses say trolleybuses stopped in the middle of the streets, where they were forced to do so by a power outage. After most of Khreshchatyk was blown up, the trolleybus could be rebuilt only if the catenary was restored. When the occupiers realized that they would have to leave Kyiv, they dismantled all the remains of the contact wire and took the 18 best YTB-4 trolleybuses to Poznań, Gdynia and Königsburg (6 cars to each city). However, the workers were able to "disguise" several trolleybuses YATB-1 and YATB-2, thus "saving" them from export.

=== After World War II: Reconstruction ===
Immediately after the liberation of Kyiv from the occupiers, the task was set to resume tram traffic, so on January 1, 1944, the tram of route No 13 resumed operation. However, due to lack of electricity between January 1 and February 20, 1944, there were 1,422 power outages. Nevertheless, trolleybus restoration works were carried out in parallel with trams. 12 Almaty YATB-4As were mentioned and due to the long-term restoration of the network, 8 trolleybuses were ordered to be transferred to Donetsk and 4 to Kharkiv. However, as it turned out, only 6 trolleybuses were sent, all to Kharkiv. At the end of 1943, a special commission inspected the surviving trolleybuses and concluded that 10 of the 29 mobile units (4 of the 14 YATB-1s and all 6 YATB-2s) could be restored. In May 1944, the Tram trust prepared a comprehensive program for the restoration of electric vehicles from 1944 to 1947.

In 1944, route Lva Tolstoho Square – Dzerzhinsky Plant opened with 5 rolling stock cars. In 1945, 5 more cars were added and route Lva Tolstoho Square – Bessarabka – Tarasa Shevchenka Boulevard – Cominterna Street – Railway Station were opened. In 1946, 20 new cars were to arrive in Kyiv, and the line along Tarasa Shevchenka Boulevard was to be extended by the Brest-Litovsk highway to the Park of Culture and Recreation of the Bilshovik Plant. Only in 1947 was it planned to restore the section along Khreshchatyk and extend the line of the Brest-Litovsk highway to Verstatobud. Another 30 new trolleybuses were to run on these lines.

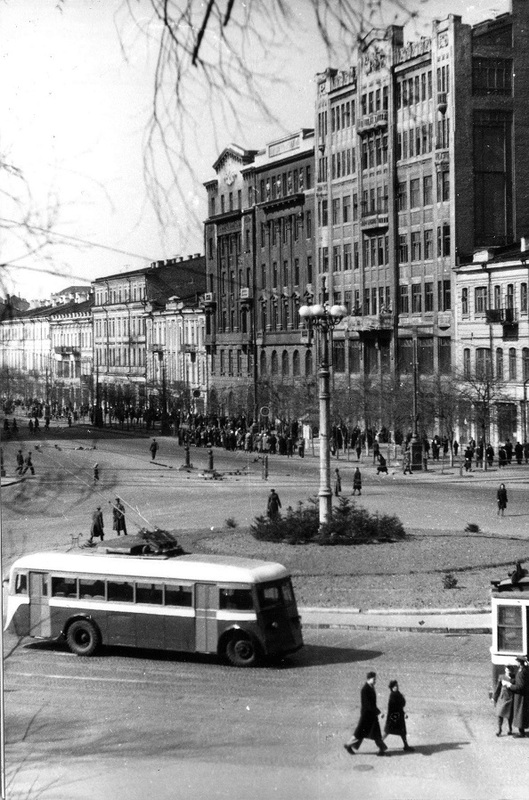
YATB-4 trolleybus on European Square (then Stalin Square) in 1940

On June 30, 1944, the Tram trust was renamed the Kyiv Tram and Trolleybus Department (KTTU). Already on November 2, 1944, a test drive was conducted on the route Tolstoy Square – Dzerzhinsky Plant. The route was opened by 4 YATB trolleybuses, which after the LK-5 was written off were renumbered from 1. The fare was 1 rouble, and luggage transportation was prohibited. In winter, electric vehicles again lacked electricity. Production was limited to 3 cars. According to the order of the City Council of April 1, 1945, the trolleybus route was divided into sections, so passengers traveling shorter distances paid 50 kopecks instead of 1 rouble.

In connection with the "arrangement of travel on Velyka Zhytomyrska, Lvivska, Dorohozhytska, and Osiivska Streets and the removal of tram tracks from them, in 1946 it was planned to open trolleybus traffic on the above streets. But due to the catastrophic lack of rolling stock, the Dzerzhinsky Plant organized the production of trolleybus carcasses. Between 1946 and 1947, 80 new trolleybuses were to arrive in Kyiv. 15 new cars were enough to open a new line. But due to the lack of funds, Kyiv residents did not see any trolleybuses or a new route that year.

As of the end of 1947, the route network was to look like this:

- 1 Stalin Square – Dzerzhinsky Plant
- 2 Stalin Square – Bessarabka – Railway Station
- 3 Stalin Square – Bessarabka – Verstatobud
- 4 Railway Station – Dzerzhinsky Plant

All these plans were implemented, but in a slightly different order and with less output on the routes.

==== MTB-82M Trolleybus ====
In April 1947, the first 5 MTB-82M vehicles arrived in Kyiv. They received No 1, 2, 3, 5, 6. The car No 1 was completely ready for operation, so on April 29, 1947, the driver S. Syuskin drove it on the 2nd route. During this year, the city received another 27 trolleybuses of this type. Due to such an unexpected replenishment, Kyiv in October 1947 transferred 4 MAN trolleybuses to Dnipropetrovsk free of charge to open a route network there.

==== Lukianivska Line ====
The replenishment of rolling stock allowed a route to be opened September 25, 1947, in the busiest area in the city at that time: Stalin Square – Lva Tolstoho Square. This line received the 3rd number. 3 trolleybuses were produced on the route and it was sent for unloading "two", which, in turn, produced at least 10 cars. Also, the replenishment of the trolleybus fleet forced the Dzerzhinsky Plant to cede the territory of the factory warehouse, in favor of the trolleybus depot.

=== Reconstruction of the City Centre and New Trolleybuses ===
In 1947, the reconstruction of the city center was in full swing, and reconstruction and changes in trolleybus traffic did not go unnoticed. The trolleybus route to the Dzerzhinsky Plant was temporarily suspended and route No 1 was closed. And if the repair works on Khreshchatyk were completed, the issue on Krasnoarmeyska Street remained open. Even before the war it was planned to move the tram tracks on the Horkoho Street. This meant that the trolleybus was equipped with all the growing and busiest passenger traffic in the city at that time, which required coordinated and clear operation of the cars on the route. And given the fact that the Horkoho Street is not so wide and spacious, the quality of transportation would deteriorate significantly. But the line to Horkoho Street was completed only to the Dymytrova Street. This meant that almost all passenger traffic fell on the soon-to-be-restored trolleybus route No 1.

Routes as of January 1, 1948:

- 1 Dzerzhinsky Plant – Lva Tolstoho Square
- 2 Stalin Square – Railway Station
- 3 Stalin Square – Lva Tolstoho Square
- 4 Kalinina Square – Cable Plant (Lukyanivka)

=== Innovations in late 1940s ===
On September 5, 1948, routes No 1 and 3 merged into a single routes No 1, running from Stalin Square to the Dzerzhinsky Plant. Subsequently, route No 3 was renewed from time to time when it was needed, although it worked only during rush hour.

As of January 1, 1950, the route network took the following form:

- 1 Avtostrada (Stalinka) – Stalin Square
- 2 Hall. Station – Sq. Stalin
- 4 Kalinia Square – Cable Plant
- 5 Tolstoho Square – Polova Street
- 7 Stalin Square – Polova Street
- 8 Avtostrada (Stalinka) – Railway Terminal

=== 1950s in the history of the Kyiv Trolleybus ===
On November 5, 1950, after the restoration of the Stalinskyi Viaduct, the trolleybuses of route No 1 followed the extended route to the Frunze Club. And on December 31, 1950, after the completion of the construction of the line by the Avtostrada to Navodnytskyi Bridge, traffic was opened on the trolleybus route No 11: Frunze Club – Navodnytskyi Bridge (Dnieper Embankment). Four trolleybuses came to the line. On the same day, the total length of the trolleybus network reached 41.4 km (25.7 mi). Also shortly before that, the depot was replenished with 51 trolleybuses.

==== New lines and reorganization in the city centre ====
Due to the tension of streets in the city centre, one-way traffic was introduced on some routes:

- trolleybuses on route No 4 in the direction of Kalinina Square did not move along Mykhailivska Street, but Mala Zhytomyrska Street
- trolleybus routes No 2, 7, 8, and 9 in the direction of Stalin Square went on Leontovich Street, instead of Pirogov Street

Also, route No 9 was shortened to Khreshchatyk and unfolded in the quarter of Leontovicha Street – Lenina Street – Khreshchatyk – Tarasa Shevchenka Boulevard.

===== Chokolivka Line =====
Areas with new buildings were quickly settled, so it was necessary to connect them with the city center. The first such step in the trolleybus economy was the opening on January 1, 1952, of the trolleybus route No 8: Stalin Square – Fishcombinate. The line was served by 6 trolleybuses.The weak point of the route was a wooden bridge across the Lybid River, because there was no full-fledged Air Fleet overpass at that time. And a little more than six months later, on July 15, the line was extended from the Fishcombinate to the Airport, which allowed to open route No 9: Stalin Square – Airport. 7 trolleybuses were released on the route; on the same day on route No 8 were also produced 7 mobile units.

===== Teremky Line =====
Until the spring of 1954, the construction of the line to the Agricultural Exhibition continued. On May 23 route No 11 was opened: Stalin Square – Orikhuvatska Square. The route included 11 trolleybuses. The construction of the new line was completed on April 22, 1955, at the same time route No 12 was opened: Stalin Square – Agricultural Exhibition. At the same time, the output was 11 cars – at the expense of No 1 (2 trolleybuses), at the expense of No 11 (3 trolleybuses) and at the expense of the reserve (6 trolleybuses). These routes were to take residents to the newly opened exhibition. The trolleybus was to be assisted by a tram line, the project of which was frozen due to the planned launch of the metro (which was opened only in 2011).

As of January 1, 1956, the route network in the city looked like this:

- 1 Stalin Square – Frunze Club
- 2 Stalin Square – Hall. Station
- 3 Stalin Square – Sq. Tolstoy
- 4 Kalinina Square – Cable Plant
- 5 Tolstoho Square – Railway section
- 7 Stalin Square – Polova Street
- 8 Stalin Square – Fishcombinate
- 9 Khreshchatyk – Airport
- 10 Railway Terminal – Patona Bridge
- 11 Stalin Square – Orikhuvatska Square
- 12 Stalin Square – Agricultural Exhibition

=== Development from 1960 to 1980 ===
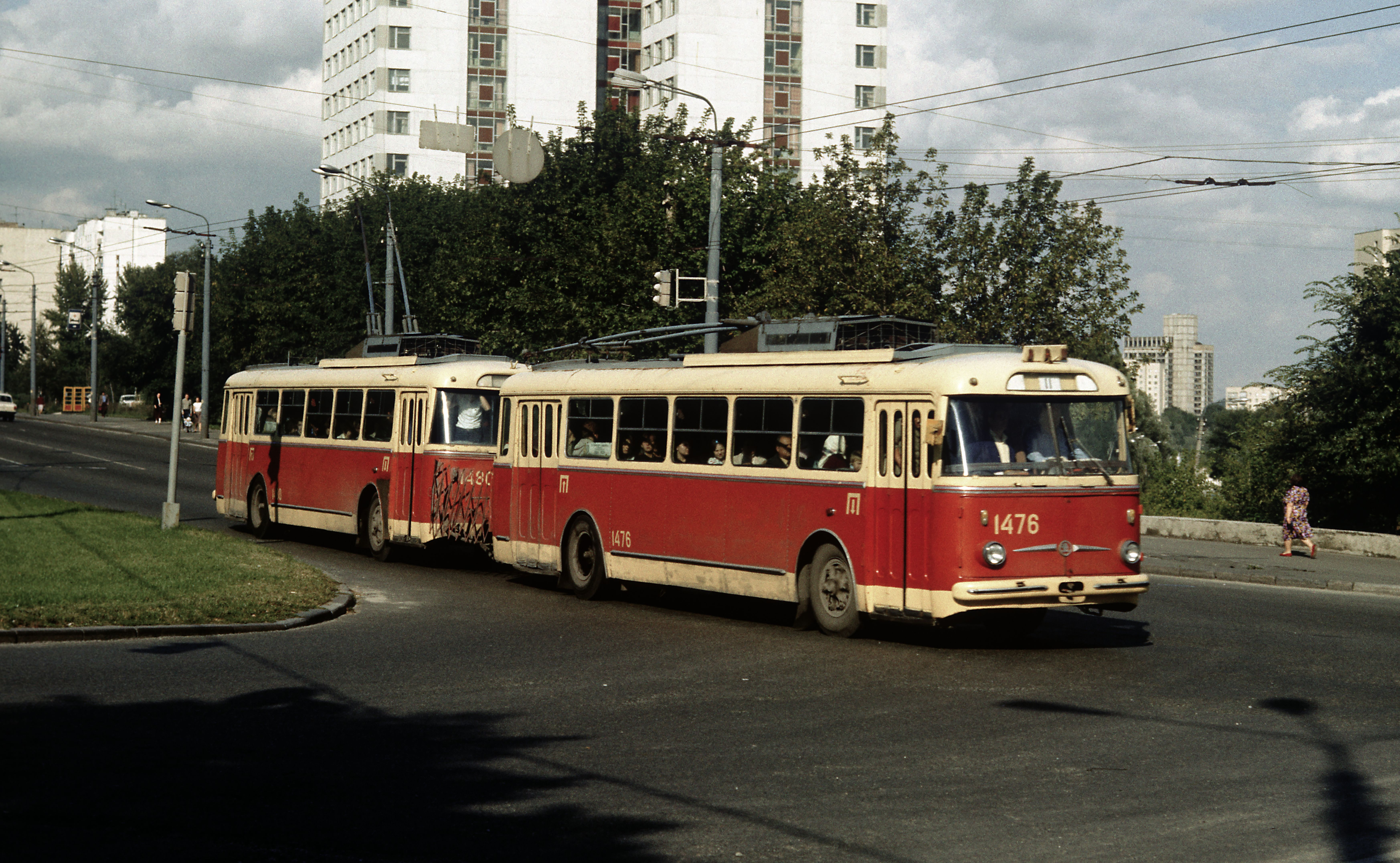
Train from two Škoda 9Tr trolleybuses connected by the system of Volodymyr Veklych trial operation began in Kyiv (1986)

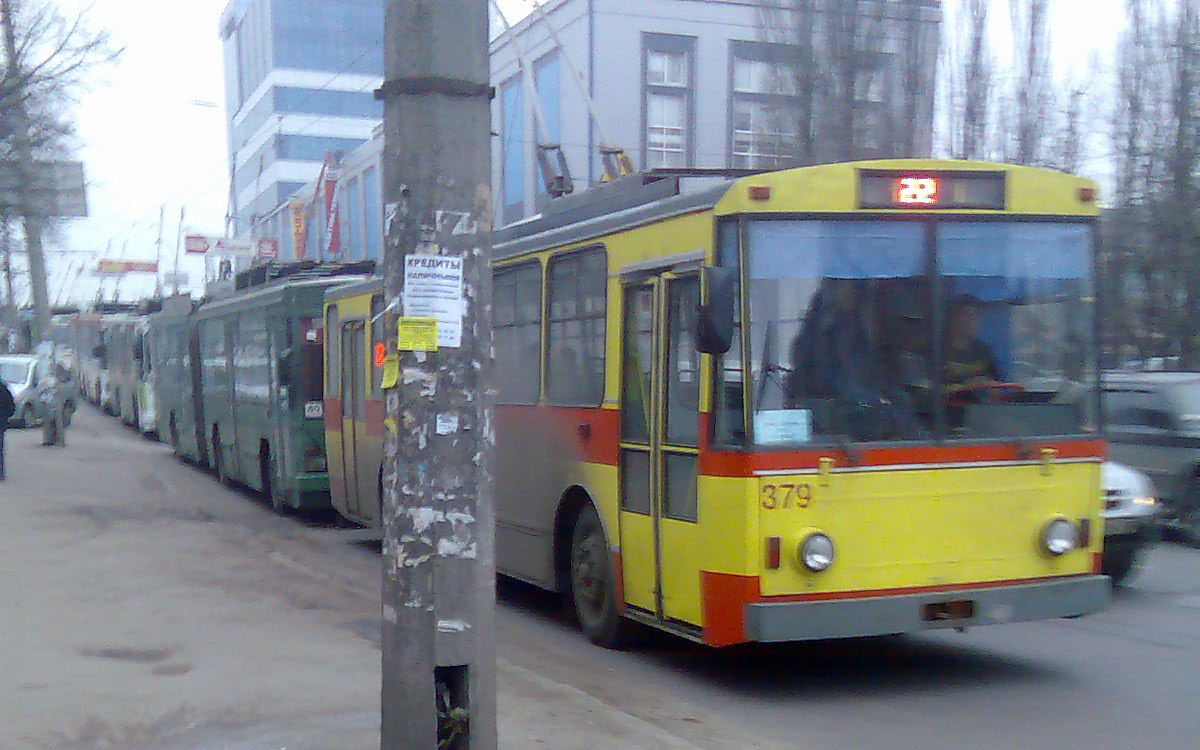
Škoda 14Tr route No 22 on Vadyma Hetmana Street

The 1960s were the "golden age" of trolleybuses in the USSR, and Kyiv was no exception. If in 1947 there were only 3 routes, in 1970 there were 24. Accordingly, the number of trolleybuses increased to 737. Kyiv began to produce its own trolleybuses under the same name "Kyiv"; but there were only a few models. On June 12, 1966 trial operation began on route No 6 of the world's first trolleybus train No 205/84 by Kyiv inventor Volodymyr Veklych, consisting of two MTB-82D trolleybuses.

Later (in the 1970s) the development of the trolleybus network slowed down a bit – in fact, only 4 lines were built – on Chubarya Avenue (now Vidradnyi Avenue), in the residential areas of Vynohradar and Teremky-2 and branches on Syretska Street. The last domestic MTB-82 trolleybuses were written off in 1974, and since then until 1991 the trolleybus fleet in Kyiv consisted exclusively of foreign-made trolleybuses – Czechoslovak Škoda 9Tr, Škoda 14Tr and Škoda 15Tr, and, since the late 1980s – Romanian DAC E217.

In the late 1980s, the length of the trolleybus network was about 280 km (170 mi), there were 30 trolleybus routes, the fleet of trolleybuses was about 1220 trolleybuses – this was a kind of peak of development. New Czechoslovak and Romanian articulated Škoda 15Tr and DAC E217 trolleybuses appeared.

=== At the time of independence ===
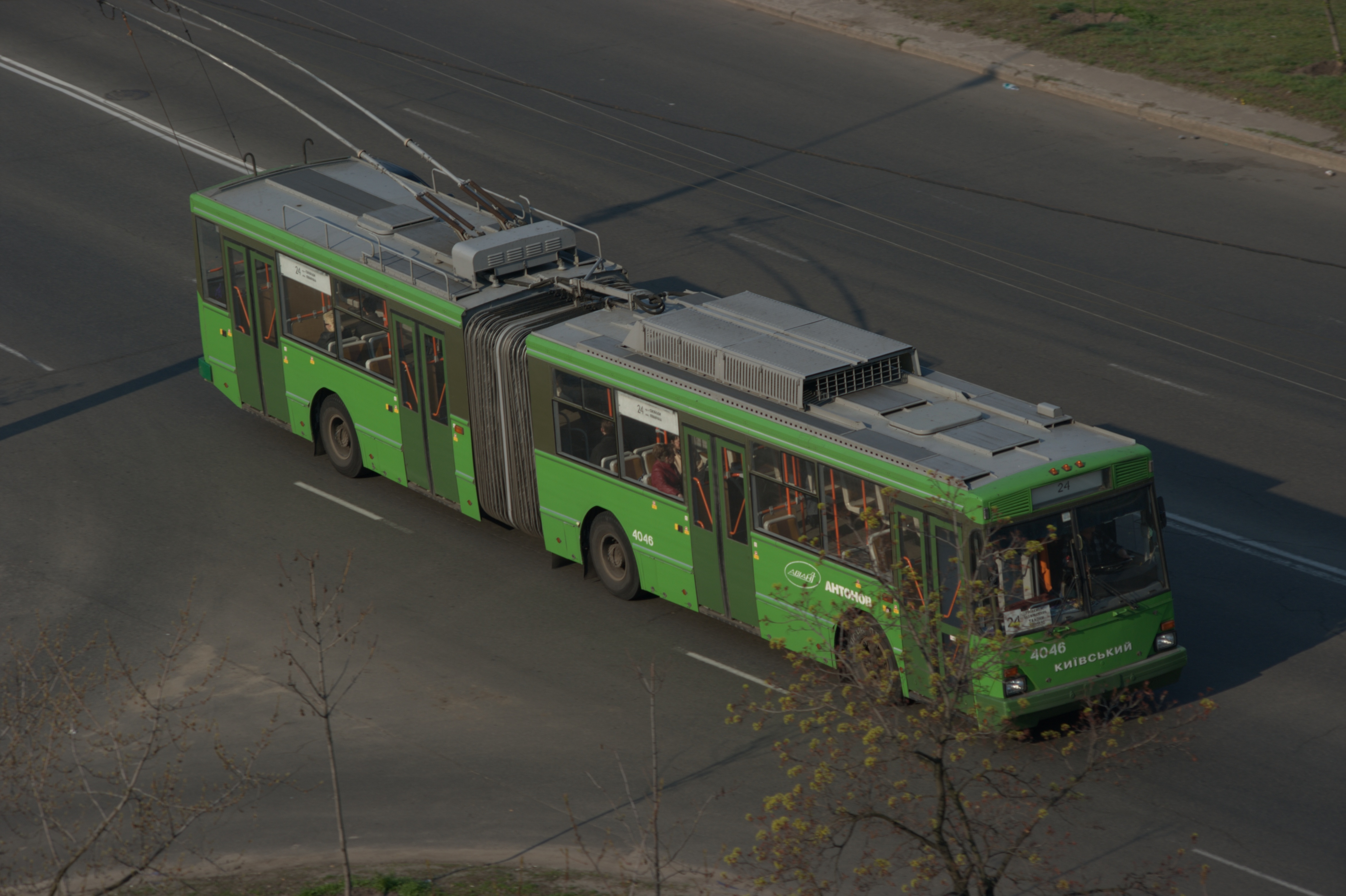
Kyiv-12.03 trolleybus

In the early 1990s, the first signs of a crisis appeared: trolleybus routes were reduced (eventually, by the early 2000s, almost all trolleybus lines in the central part of the city were liquidated), and old trolleybuses were written off en masse in the absence of new arrivals. Production of Kyiv's own trolleybuses began: Kyiv-11 and Kyiv-11u, which later "turned" into the more massive UMZ-T1 and UMZ-T2, already produced in Dnipropetrovsk.

The number of trolleybuses was rapidly declining and in 10 years – in the early 2000s, was about 500 – less than half of the previous number. However, at this time, along with the closure of lines in the central part of the city, the rapid development of the trolleybus network continued on the outskirts – from the mid-1990s to 2005, lines were built on the Obolon district (in 1995), as a replacement for closed tram lines trolleybus lines to Solomyanka through Saksahanskoho and Uritskoho Streets (now Mitropolitan Vasyla Lypkivskoho; this was the No 3 in 2001) were launched instead of the tram by the Paton Bridge to Darnytska Square, as well as lines across Protasiv Yar Street (this was route No 40 in 2004), to the Teremky-1 and Lisovyi districts in Mykilska Borshchahivka, on Akademika Zabolotnoho Street, and the (near Borshchahivka), along Kutuzov Street (now General Almazov Street) and Moskovska Street, along Chervonozoryanyi Avenue (now Valery Lobanovskyi Avenue), and the number of lines on the Obolon, Vynohradyshchyna and Vyhiv districts had expanded. However, in the conditions of insufficient number of trolleybuses, all these measures only led to the strain of the existing lines (rolling stock for new routes was simply removed from the existing ones).

In 2006 the ElectroLAZ-12 trolleybus was presented. In total, Kyiv purchased 53 such trolleybuses. And a little later – in 2007, its extended version – ElectroLAZ-20. From 2007 to 2012, the trolleybus network of the capital received about 130 trolleybuses of this brand. There were also 4 Bohdan-E231 trolleybuses in operation at the Kurenivskyi Trolleybus Depot.

Before the European Football Championship of 2012, the Bohdan Motors bus plant agreed with the city authorities for the supply of Bohdan T701.10 and Bohdan T901.10 trolleybuses. From 2011 to 2014, 93 single Bohdan T701.10 trolleybuses and 50 articulated Bohdan T901.10 trolleybuses started operating in Kyiv.

In April 2014, route No 6 was extended along the extended route (Independence Square – Diahnoticheskyi Center), and on August 23 of the same year, 3 routes were opened at once: No 9 (TRED No 3, Kyiv Airport – Lva Tolstoho Square); No 15 (TRED No 1, Vydubychi metro station – Palace of Sports metro station); No 33 (TRED No 2, Pivdennyi Railway Station – Diahnotycheskyi Center (Minsk District)).

On December 20, 2016. route No 46 was closed. Simultaneously extensions for routes were added:

- 1 – from Lybidska metro station to Zhylyanska Street on the route "Marshalska Street – Zhylyanska Street";
- 11 – from Exhibition Center metro station to Marshalska Street on the route "Pirohovo Museum of Architecture and Life – Marshalska Street";
- 50 – from Darnytska Square to Lybidska metro station on the route Miloslavska Street – Lybidska metro station;
- 50K – from Darnytsia metro station to Darnytska Square on the route Myloslavska Street – Darnytska Square.

Since the beginning of January 2017, night routes were opened:

- 91N: "Railway Terminal – Miloslavska Street";
- 92N: "Southern Railway Terminal – Svobody Avenue";
- 93N: "Lva Tolstoho Square – Chornobylska Street".

On December 4, 2017, the route No 19D "Kadetskyi Hai Street – Yuriya Illenka Street (Motorcycle Plant)" was opened to study the demand of residents of Solomyanskyi and Shevchenkivskyi districts in passenger transportation.

On February 6, 2018, route No 1 was reduced to Lybidska metro station, and route No 12 was extended from Yuriya Smolycha Street to Vasylkivska metro station.

On February 22, 2018, route No 7 was extended to Lva Tolstoho Square along the route "Chornobylska Street – Lva Tolstoho Square".

On August 18, 2018, the route No 9 was reoriented from Lva Tolstoho Square to Palace of Sports metro station through the South Kyiv Passenger Railway Terminal.

On August 22, 2018, changes were made to routes No 16, 23, 91N and 92N. Namely:

- trolleybus route No 16 was extended to Akademika Tupoleva Street along Yuriya Illenka and Akademika Shchuseva Streets without arriving to Dorohozhytska and Ryzka Streets;
- trolleybus No 23 now ran on Ryzka and Dorohozhytska Streets instead of Akademika Tupoleva and Yuriya Illenka Streets. The termini did not change;
- Route 91N was extended from Volodymyra Mayakovskoho Avenue along Maryna Tsvetaeva and Radunska Streets to Myloslavska Street (terminus of trolleybuses No 31 and 37);
- Route 92N was extended from South Kyiv Passenger Railway Terminal along Povitroflotskyi Avenue to Kyiv Airport.

In addition, on August 22, 2018, a new night route was introduced: No 94 "Lva Tolstoho Square – Lesya Kurbasa Avenue".

== Current system ==
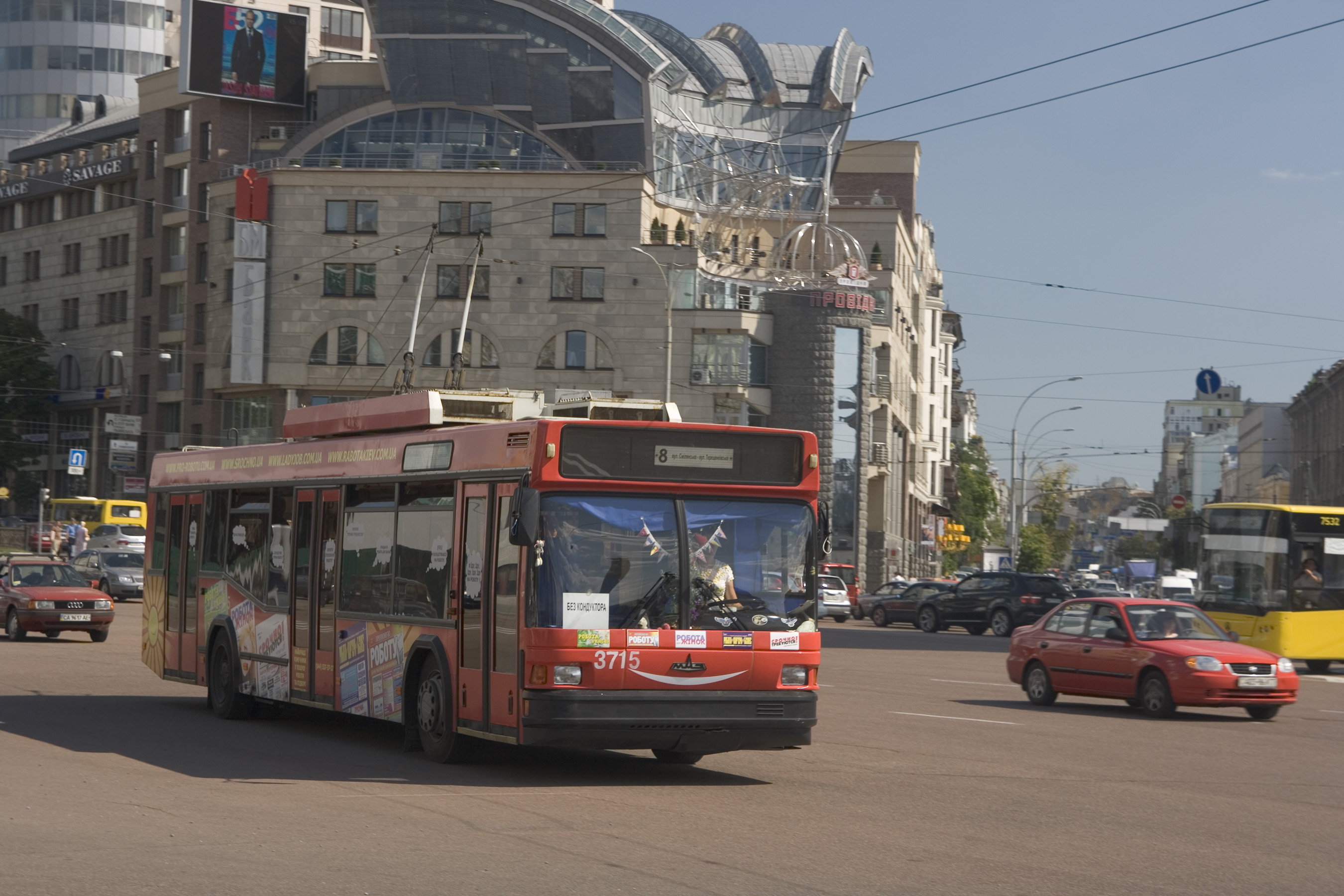
MAZ-103T trolleybus on route No 8 on Peremohy Square

During 2005–2008, some improvements took place – in addition to the appearance of a number of new lines from Darnytska Square to the Vyhurivshchyna-Troyeshchyna district – trolleybus depot No 1 was moved to the Teremky-2 district area and a number of routes in the city center were relocated due to traffic reorganization. The purchase of fully low-floor trolleybuses of domestic production from Lviv and Lutsk and from Makarova plants was started. Most trolleybuses of Lviv production – both articulated and single – were purchased together, together with more than 150 new vehicles. Along with the write-off of old trolleybuses, there was a small increase in the trolleybus fleet.

As of August 2014, the fleet of Kyiv trolleybuses had 533 rolling stock, 44 routes, and the length of the lines is about 500 km (310 mi). As of 2020, there are 629 vehicles and 48 lines.

== Future planning ==
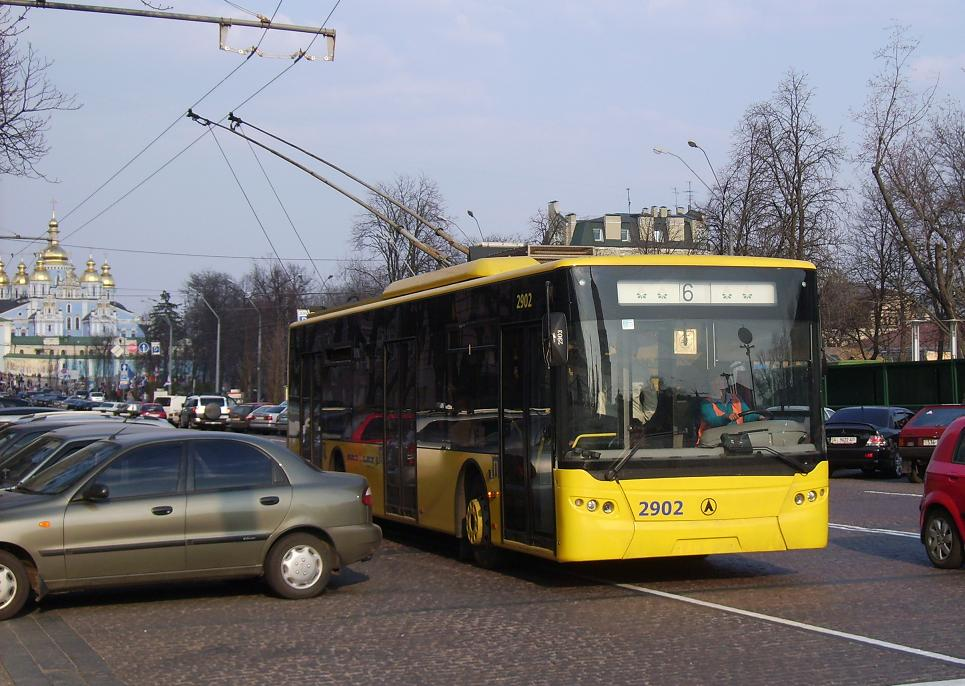
LAZ E183 No 2902 on route No 6

The possibility of building a new line on Staronavodnytska Street and Klovskyi Descent is being considered. There are also projects to restore the trolleybus line that connected the railway terminal and Sophia Square.

The GenPlan of Kyiv envisages the construction of lines by the Dnipro riverside and Rusanivska riverside, and on Haharina Avenue, Bratislava Street, and Koroleva Avenue.

On November 2, 2016, the Kyiv City State Administration decided to build a trolleybus line from Troieshchyna to Sevastopol Square and reconstruct a trolleybus line from Romana Shukhevycha Avenue to Darnytsia station with a separate bus and trolleybus line.

It is also planned to further upgrade the rolling stock with as much replacement as possible to low-floor trolleybuses.

== Fare ==
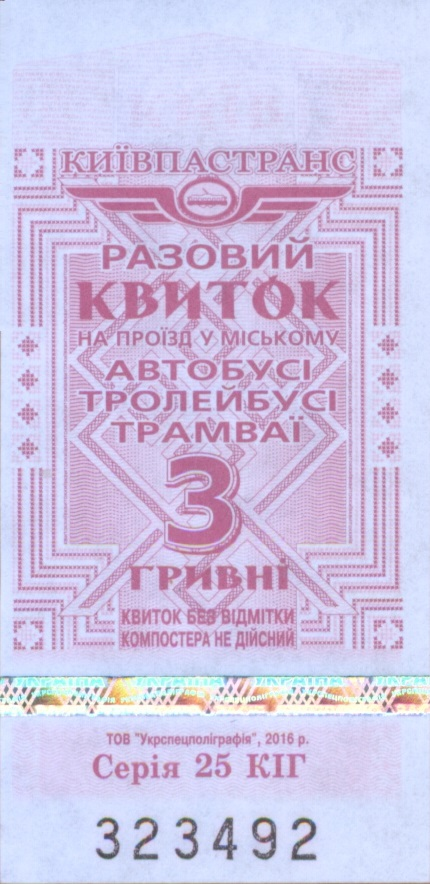
2016 single ride ticket

In the first decades of the trolleybus's existence in the city, the fare was differentiated depending on the distance. In the 1960s, a single fare was introduced; later in the 1960s, conductors were finally abandoned and special ticket offices were introduced, and following that composters were installed.

In the 1970s and 1980s, the fare was 4 kopecks, but was then increased to 15 kopecks, then to 30 kopecks.

From 2000 to November 4, 2008, the fare was 50 kopecks. After that, the fare was 1 hryvnia 50 kopecks. From February 7, 2015, the one-time fare was 3 ₴, from July 15, 2017, it was 4 ₴, and from July 14, 2018, the cost is 8 ₴.

Tickets can be purchased at specialized kiosks at bus stops, as well as kiosks with a press located near the stops, as well as from the conductor (although most trolleybuses during the day, as well as all early in the morning and late in the evening after 7–8 pm do not have a conductor on board). Tickets can also be purchased from the driver when the trolleybus is at a stop. The ticket must be composted immediately; without a composter mark the ticket is considered invalid. The fine for ticketless travel (uncomposed tickets) is 160 hryvnias. There is a project to introduce full trolleybus traffic at night, with fares after 10:00 p.m. and until 6:00 a.m. tripling, but for privileged categories of the population the fare will be normal and the interval should be the same on weekdays and weekends.

From July 14, 2021, the circulation of paper tickets in trolleybuses will be completely stopped, and fare payment will be made only by an electronic ticket.

== Routes ==
=== Current routes ===
As of May 25, 2020, the following routes are in effect:

Temporarily not working (see details in the notes)
Temporary or temporarily changed route (see opening hours in the notes)

Route	Schedule	Terminus	Terminus	Via	Notes
1		Lybidska station	Marshalska Street	бульв. Дружби Народів — просп. Науки	
3		Palace of Sports	Railway District	вул. Еспланадна — вул. Саксаганського — вул. Льва Толстого — вул. Митрополита Василя Липківського — вул. Солом'янська — вул. Волгоградська	
5		Lva Tolstoho Square	Bilytska Street	вул. Льва Толстого — вул. Володимирська — бульв. Тараса Шевченка — просп. Перемоги — вул. Данила Щербаківського — вул. Івана Виговського — вул. Сирецька	
6		Independence Square	Minskyi District	Мала Житомирська вул. — Володимирський проїзд — вул. Володимирська — вул. Велика Житомирська — вул. Січових Стрільців — вул. Юрія Іллєнка — вул. Герцена — вул. Овруцька — Подільський узвіз — вул. Кирилівська — вул. Вишгородська — вул. Полярна — просп. Маршала Роккосовського	
7		Lva Tolstoho Square	Chornobylska Street	вул. Льва Толстого — вул. Володимирська — бульв. Тараса Шевченка — просп. Перемоги — вул. Чорнобильська — вул. Ірпінська	
8		Lva Tolstoho Square	Smilyanska Street	вул. Льва Толстого — вул. Володимирська — бульв. Тараса Шевченка — просп. Перемоги — Повітрофлотський просп. — вул. Народного ополчення	
9		Palace of Sports	Zhuliany Airport	вул. Еспланадна — вул. Саксаганського — вул. Льва Толстого — вул. Ползунова — вул. Івана Огієнка — Повітрофлотський просп.	
11		Marshalska Street	Museum of National Architecture and Construction	просп. Науки — Голосіївський просп. — просп. Академіка Глушкова — вул. Академіка Заболотного	
12		Kyiv Passenger Railway Terminal	Vasylkivska station	вул. Симона Петлюри — вул. Жилянська — вул. Антоновича — бульвар Дружби народів — Голосіївський просп. — просп. Академіка Глушкова — вул. Василя Касіяна — вул. Маршала Якубовського — вул. Академіка Вільямса — вул. Михайла Максимовича — вул. Амурська — вул. Козацька — вул. Сумська	Travels via Saperno-Slobidska Street and the Roshen Factory (in the direction of the railway terminal).
14		Kyiv Passenger Railway Terminal	NAN Ukraine Botanical Garden	вул. Симона Петлюри — вул. Жилянська — вул. Шота Руставелі — вул. Басейна — бульв. Лесі Українки — вул. Бастіонна	It is impossible to operate longer trolleybuses due to the u-turn on Bastionna Street.
15		Palace of Sports	Vydubychi station	вул. Еспланадна — вул. Рогнідинська — вул. Шота Руставелі — вул. Басейна — бульв. Лесі Українки — вул. Михайла Бойчука — Залізничне шосе	
16		Independence Square	Academic Tupolev Street	Мала Житомирська вул. — Володимирський проїзд — вул. Володимирська — вул. Велика Житомирська — вул. Січових Стрільців — вул. Юрія Іллєнка — вул. Щусєва — вул. Стеценка – площа Валерія Марченка – вул. Стеценка	
17		Lva Tolstoho Square	Cosmonaut Square	вул. Льва Толстого — вул. Володимирська — бульв. Тараса Шевченка — просп. Перемоги — Повітрофлотський просп. — вул. Авіаконструктора Антонова	
18		Independence Square	Soshenka Street	Мала Житомирська вул. — Володимирський проїзд — вул. Володимирська — вул. Велика Житомирська — вул. Січових Стрільців — вул. Юрія Іллєнка — вул. Герцена — вул. Овруцька — Подільський узвіз — вул. Кирилівська — вул. Вишгородська	
19		Olzhycha Street	Cosmonaut Square	вул. Олени Теліги — вул. Ризька — вул. Дорогожицька — вул. Юрія Іллєнка — вул. Січових Стрільців — вул. В'ячеслава Чорновола — Повітрофлотський просп. — вул. Авіаконструктора Антонова	
19D		Kadetskyi Grove	Yurii Illenka Street	вул. Івана Пулюя — вул. Федора Ернста — вул. Народного ополчення — Повітрофлотський просп. — вул. В'ячеслава Чорновола — вул. Січових Стрільців — вул. Юрія Іллєнка розворот на перетині вул. Юрія Іллєнка та вул. Дорогожицької — вул. Юрія Іллєнка — вул. Січових Стрільців — вул. В'ячеслава Чорновола — Повітрофлотський просп. — вул. Народного ополчення — вул. Смілянська —вул. Народного ополчення — вул. Федора Ернста — вул. Івана Пулюя	
22		Olzhycha Street	Zhuliany Airport	вул. Олени Теліги — вул. Олександра Довженка — вул. Вадима Гетьмана — Чоколівський бульвар — Повітрофлотський просп.	
23		Academic Tupolev Street	Lukyanivska Square	вул. Ігоря Турчина — вул. Стеценка — вул. Щусєва – вул. Максима Берлинського – вул. Ризька – вул. Дорогожицька — вул. Юрія Іллєнка — вул. Деревлянська — вул. Білоруська	
24		Northern Street	Svobody Avenue	просп. Героїв Сталінграда — вул. Маршала Тимошенка — вул. Лугова — просп. Правди — просп. Свободи	
25		Pochaina station	Svobody Avenue	Оболонський просп. — просп. Степана Бандери — вул. Кирилівська — вул. Мостицька — вул. Наталії Ужвій — просп. Свободи	
26		Svobody Avenue	Nyvky station	просп. Свободи — вул. Василя Порика — просп. Правди — вул. Івана Виговського — вул. Данила Щербаківського	
27		Pochaina station	Kyiv-Volynskyi railway station	Оболонський просп. — просп. Степана Бандери — вул. Олени Теліги — вул. Олександра Довженка — вул. Вадима Гетьмана — вул. Миколи Голего — Відрадний просп. — вул. Пост-Волинська	
28		Svobody Avenue	Lukianivska station	просп. Свободи — вул. Наталії Ужвій — вул. Мостицька — вул. Вишгородська — вул. Кирилівська — Подільський узвіз — вул. Овруцька — вул. Юрія Іллєнка	
29		Zenit railway station	Darnytsia station	просп. Степана Бандери — Північний міст — просп. Романа Шухевича — бульв. Перова — просп. Визволителів — вул. Андрія Малишка	
30		Myloslavska Street	Kadetskyi Grove	просп. Володимира Маяковського — просп. Романа Шухевича — Північний міст — просп. Степана Бандери — вул. Олени Теліги — вул. Олександра Довженка — вул. Вадима Гетьмана — Чоколівський бульвар — вул. Народного ополчення — вул. Федора Ернста	
31		Zenit railway station	Myloslavska Street	просп. Степана Бандери — Північний міст — просп. Романа Шухевича — просп. Володимира Маяковського — вул. Марини Цвєтаєвої — вул. Лісківська — вул. Радунська	
32		Northern Street	Soshenka Street	вул. Героїв Дніпра — вул. Зої Гайдай — вул. Полярна	
33		Kyiv Passenger South Railway Terminal	Minskyi District	вул. Ползунова — вул. Івана Огієнка — Повітрофлотський просп. — вул. В'ячеслва Чорновола — вул. Січових Стрільців — вул. Юрія Іллєнка — вул. Овруцька — Подільський узвіз — вул. Кирилівська — вул. Вишгородська — вул. Полярна — просп. Маршала Рокоссовського	
34		Pochaina station	Northern Street	просп. Степана Бандери — просп. Героїв Сталінграда — вул. Маршала Тимошенка — просп. Героїв Сталінграда	After passing Minska station, trolleybuses in the direction of Pochaina station travel via Zenit railway station.
35		Yaroslava Ivashkevycha Street	Dorohozhychi station	просп. Правди — вул. Василя Порика — просп. Свободи — просп. Георгія Гонгадзе — вул. Івана Виговського — вул. Стеценка — вул. Щусєва	Works only on weekdays.
37		Myloslavska Street	Lisova station	вул. Радунська – вул. Теодора Драйзера – вул. Братиславська — Лісовий просп. – вул. Кубанської України – вул. Кіото	
37A		Mykoly Zakrevskoho Street Polyclinic	Lisova station	вул. Марини Цвєтаєвої – вул. Лісківська – вул. Радунська – вул. Теодора Драйзера – вул. Братиславська – Лісовий просп. – вул. Мілютенка – вул. Кіото	
38		Vydubychi station	Ukrainian National World War II Museum	Залізничне шосе — вул. Михайла Бойчука — бульв. Лесі Українки — вул. Генерала Алмазова — вул. Московська — вул. Івана Мазепи — вул. Лаврська	
39		Choronobylska Street	Lesya Kurbasa Avenue	вул. Ірпінська — вул. Чорнобильська — вул. Академіка Єфремова — просп. Академіка Палладіна — Кільцева дорога	
40		Kadetskyi Grove	Palaca of Sports	вул. Івана Пулюя — вул. Федора Ернста — вул. Народного ополчення — Повітрофлотський просп. — вул. Солом'янська — вул. Протасів Яр — вул. Івана Федорова — вул. Велика Васильківська — вул. Жилянська — вул. Шота Руставелі — вул. Рогнідинська — вул. Еспланадна	
40K		Kadetskyi Grove	Zhylyanska Street	вул. Івана Пулюя — вул. Федора Ернста — вул. Народного ополчення — Повітрофлотський просп. — вул. Солом'янська — вул. Протасів Яр — вул. Івана Федорова — вул. Велика Васильківська — вул. Жилянська — вул. Шота Руставелі — вул. Саксаганського — вул. Антоновича	Works only on weekdays.
41		Sviatoshyn station	Tuluzi Street	вул. Святошинська — вул. Жмеринська — вул. Героїв Космосу — вул. Якуба Коласа — бульв. Ромена Роллана — просп. Леся Курбаса — Кільцева дорога	
42		Lybidska station	Dehtyarivska Street	бульвар Дружби народів — просп. Валерія Лобановського — Чоколівський бульвар — вул. Вадима Гетьмана – вул. Олександра Довженка	
43		Cybernetic Center	Darnytska Square	просп. Академіка Глушкова — Голосіївський просп. — бульвар Дружби народів — Міст Патона — просп. Соборності	It is impossible to operate longer trolleybuses on this line due to the critical condition of the Paton Bridge. Instead they are rerouted to Lybidska station.
44		Northern Street	Stepana Bandery Avenue	вул. Героїв Дніпра — вул. Зої Гайдай — вул. Маршала Тимошенка — вул. Маршала Малиновського — вул. Йорданська — вул. Олександра Архипенка — просп. Героїв Сталінграда	
45		Vystavkovyi Tsentr station	Vasylkivska station	Просп. Академіка Глушкова — вул. Василя Касіяна — вул. Маршала Якубовського — вул. Академіка Вільямса — вул. Михайла Максимовича — вул. Амурська — вул. Козацька — вул. Сумська	
47		Minska station	Myloslavska Street	вул. Маршала Тимошенка — просп. Героїв Сталінграда — Північний міст — просп. Романа Шухевича — просп. Володимира Маяковського	
50		Mylosavska Street	Lybidska station	просп. Володимира Маяковського — бульв. Перова — просп. Визволителів — вул. Будівельників (назад: просп. Миру) — просп. Соборності — Міст Патона — бульвар Дружби народів	It is impossible to operate longer trolleybuses due to critical condition Paton Bridge.
50K		Myloslavska Street	Darnytska Square	просп. Володимира Маяковського — бульв. Перова — просп. Визволителів — вул. Будівельників (назад: просп. Миру)	

==== Night routes ====
As of December 30, 2016, to provide passenger transport services at night from 11 p.m. to 6 a.m. three night trolleybus routes were introduced. The routes are no longer in service due to the nighttime curfew imposed due to the Russian invasion of Ukraine.

Route	Schedule	Terminus	Terminus	Via	Notes
91N		Kyiv Passenger Railway Terminal	Myloslavska Street	вул. Симона Петлюри — вул. Жилянська — вул. Антоновича — бульвар Дружби народів — міст Патона — просп. Соборності — просп. Миру (назад: вул. Будівельників) — вул. Будівельників — просп. Визволителів — бульв. Перова — просп. Володимира Маяковського — вул. Марина Цвєтаєвої — вул. Радунська	
92N		Zhuliany Airport	Svobody Avenue	Повітрофлотський просп. — Севастопольська площа — Повітрофлотський просп. — вул. Івана Огієнка — вул. Георгія Кірпи — Залізничний вокзал Південний — вул. Ползунова — вул. Івана Огієнка — Повітрофлотський просп. — просп. Перемоги — вул. Данила Щербаківського — вул. Івана Виговського — просп. Правди — вул. Василя Порика — просп. Свободи	
93N		Lva Tolstoho Square	Chornobylska Street	вул. Льва Толстого — вул. Володимирська — бульв. Тараса Шевченка — просп. Перемоги — просп. Академіка Палладіна — вул. Академіка Єфремова — вул. Чорнобильська — вул. Ірпінська	
94N		Lva Tolstoho Square	Lesya Kurbasa Avenue	вул. Льва Толстого — вул. Володимирська — бульв. Тараса Шевченка — просп. Перемоги — Кільцева Дорога	

== Rolling stock ==
=== Current ===
Picture	Manufacturer	Model	Quantity	Since
	(Ukraine) LAZ	E183; E301	55; 34	2006; 2007
	(Ukraine) Bogdan	T701; T901	118; 143	2011; 2012
	(Turkey) Akia (Ukraine) PTS	T12309	12	2026

=== Historical ===
Picture	Manufacturer	Model	Quantity	Years
	(Russia) PTMZ	LK-5	7	1935–1941
	(Russia) YaMZ	YaTB-1; YaTB-2; YaTB-4	14; 6; 20	1937–1949; 1937–1949; 1939–1947
	(Germany) MAN		4	1945–1947
	(Russia) Trolza	MTB-82	280	1947–1974
	(Russia) SVARZ	TBES	21	1957–1969
	(Czech Republic) Škoda	8Tr	22	1960–1972
	(Ukraine) KZET	KTB-1; Kyiv-2; Kyiv-4	83; 15; 11	1960–1969; 1964–1969; 1965–1969
	(Czech Republic) Škoda	9Tr	1220	1962–1996
	(Russia) Trolza	5	60	1965–1970
	(Ukraine) KZET	Kyiv-6	2	1968–1974
	(Czech Republic) Škoda	14Tr; 15Tr	358; 46	1983–2013; 1990–2013
	(Romania) Rocar	DAC-217E	261	1986–2007
	(Ukraine) KZET (Ukraine) YuMZ	Kyiv-11; Kyiv-11u; T1; T2	3; 17; 54; 76	1991–1994; 1992–1996; 1993–2010; 1996–2018
	(Ukraine) Antonov	Kyiv-12.01; Kyiv-12.03; Kyiv-12.04	1; 90; 1	1995–2013; 1996–2022; 1999–2017
	(Belarus) MAZ (Belarus) ETON	103T; T103	59; 8	2003–2017; 2008–2022
	(Ukraine) YuMZ	E186	7	2006–2015
	(Ukraine) Bogdan	E231	3	2007–2015

== Depots ==
- Trolleybus depot No 1:
  - Address: Mykhaila Maksymovycha Street, 32 (in the period from 1935 to 2008 the depot was located at Velyka Vasylkivska Street, 137–139);
  - Opened: 1935;
  - Routes: 1, 11, 12, 14, 15, 38, 42, 43, 45, 50, 91N;
- Trolleybus depot No 2:
  - Address: Alexandra Dovzhenka Street, 7;
  - Opened: 1961;
  - Routes: 5, 6, 7, 16, 18, 23, 25, 26, 28, 33, 35, 39, 41, 93N, 94N;
- Trolleybus depot No 3:
  - Address: Narodnoho Opolchennya, 14;
  - Opened: 1968;
  - Routes: 3, 8, 9, 17, 19, 19D, 27, 40, 40K, 42, 92N;
- Kurenivske trolleybus depot (No 4):
  - Address: Syretska Street, 25;
  - Opened: 1984;
  - Routes: 24, 29, 30, 31, 32, 34, 37, 37A, 44, 47, 50, 50K, 91N.

Routes in italic are served only partially by one or another depot.

== See also ==
- Kyivpastrans, operator of trolleybuses in Kyiv
- Kyiv tram
- Transport in Kyiv

== Notes ==
- Electrotransport of Ukraine: Encyclopedic Guide / Serhiy Tarkhov, Kost Kozlov, Aare Olander. – Kyiv: Sidorenko VB, 2010. – 912 p. – ISBN 978-966-2321-11-1.
- Kozlov K., Mashkevych S. Kyiv trolleybus. – К .: Kyi, 2009. – С. 608. – ISBN 978-966-8825-58-3.
- Veklich VF The future of the Ukrainian trolleybus // City Economy of Ukraine. – 1993. – No 3/4. – P. 34–35. – ISSN 0130-1292.
- Veklych VP Train from MTB-82 trolleybuses with control system "many units" // Municipal Economy of Ukraine. – 1967. – No 2. – P. 37–38. – ISSN 0130-1284.
- Bramsky KA The world's first trolleybus train // Municipal Economy of Ukraine. – 2013. – No 4. – P. 30–31. – ISSN 0130-1284.
