= Volodymyr Karavayev =

Imperial Russian surgeon and ophthalmologist (1895–1961)

- Володи́мир Опана́сович Карава́єв
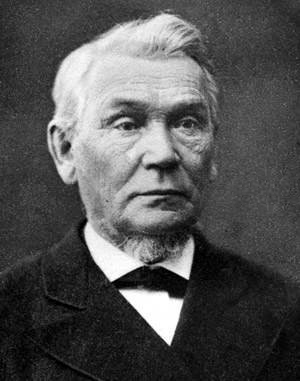
- A portrait of Karavayev.
- Born: July 8, 1811; Vyatka, Vyatka Governorate, Russian Empire
- Died: March 3, 1892 (aged 80); Kyiv, Kiev Governorate, Russian Empire
- Burial place: Baikove Cemetery
- Education: Kazan Federal University
- Occupations: Surgeon; Ophthalmologist
- Medical career
- Institutions: Faculty of Medicine of the Kyiv Imperial University of St. Volodymyr

Volodymyr Karavayev (also transliterated as Vladimir Karavayev; 8 July 1811 – 3 March 1892) was an Imperial Russian surgeon and ophthalmologist. He is best known for founding the Faculty of Medicine of the Kyiv Imperial University of St. Volodymyr (now the Kyiv Medical Institute), which he worked at for over four decades.

Born in Vyatka, in the Russian Empire, Karavayev was first a free listener at the Kazan Federal University, before moving to St. Petersburg for surgical practice. In St. Petersburg he was greatly influenced by his time at the Mariinsky Hospital for the Poor, as he admired the surgical consultants' work. He then went abroad to Berlin, where he first met Nikolay Pirogov, who would become a lifelong acquaintance and who he would follow the University of Dorpat before going to the Kronstadt Naval Hospital in 1840. After performing a large volume of work at Kronstadt, including inventing an experimental technique for treating effusive pericarditis, he was appointed as the inaugural Head of the Department of Surgery at the Faculty of Medicine of the Kyiv Imperial University of St. Volodymyr. After going abroad again to learn how to manage the institution, he came back to the university and was then appointed Dean of the Faculty of Medicine. Over the next few decades, Karavayev would continue to work in the Faculty of Medicine, where he helped organize and found departments there until his death in 1892.

== Early life ==
Karavayev was born on 8 July 1811 in Vyatka, which was located in the Vyatka Governorate in the Russian Empire at the time of his birth. He was born into a large family, and his father was a wealthy merchant. After graduating from Vyatka's gymnasium at the age of 16, he was a free listener at the Faculty of Medicine at Kazan Federal University, because Karavaev was unsure on what speciality to work in. In 1831 he completed his studies in Kazan, and was awarded a silver medal and a doctor's diploma in 1st class.

== Medical career ==
After graduating, he was not allowed to practice real surgery in Vyatka so he went to St. Petersburg. In St. Petersburg he worked from 1832 to 1833 in a military land hospital, and was then from 1833 to 1834 as a freelance medical assistant at the Mariinsky Hospital for the Poor. There, he was greatly influenced by Ilya Vasilyevich Buyalsky and H.H. Saloman, who were surgical consultants at the hospital, as he was impressed by their dedication to complex surgeries, which led him to decide he wanted to devote himself to practicing surgery. In July 1834 he left Imperial Russia to go to the Kingdom of Prussia, working at the Grefe clinic in Berlin. He also became friends with Nikolay Pirogov at this time, who would become a lifelong acquaintance, and so in 1836 when Pirogov went to the Department of Surgery at the University of Dorpat, he offered Karavayev a place to work in his clinic there which he accepted. In 1838 he defensed his dissertation on traumatic phlebitis.

For the next two years he worked in Pirogov's clinic at Dorpat, until 1839 when he went to work as a surgeon at the Kronstadt Naval Hospital until 1840. After moving to Kronsdtadt, he did a high volume of work, performing 103 operations during which he invented an experimental technique for the puncture of body fluids of the pericardial sac for treating effusive pericarditis. He stated in his textbook on operative surgery that he performed the operations during a scurvy epidemic, and that it was ultimately successful for the recipient.

On 7 December 1840, he was appointed Head of the Department of Surgery at the Faculty of Medicine of the Kyiv Imperial University of St. Volodymyr, despite the fact that the faculty of medicine had not yet been opened. While the faculty was being organized before it opened, Karavayev went to the Imperial Medical and Surgical Academy and Moscow University to learn the education processes to apply for when the faculty would open. On 24 July 1841, he returned to Kyiv to begin working at the Faculty of Medicine upon its grand opening. Upon its opening, the clinic received 5,434 inpatients and 76,000 outpatients, during which time he specialized in ophthalmology, which led to him being referred to as the first ophthalmic surgeon in then-Russia.

During the following year, he visited medical institutions in West Europe and was awarded the title of ordinary professor, and during his time abroad was elected Dean of the Faculty of Medicine in 1843. By 1848 the new Faculty of Medicine had increased to 299 students and he stepped down as dean after he performed the first procedure in modern-day Ukraine with ether anesthesia. He and Pirogov continued to work together during these years, as Pirogov would often come to Karavayev's clinic and work alongside him. He continued to work in the Faculty of Medicine, and in 1870 he helped co-found the Department of Eye Diseases within the department. He also published manuals and atlases on operative surgery until his death, with his last work being in 1886.

== Personal life ==
In 1845 he married Anna Alexandrovna Lukhmanova and together they had two sons and one daughter: Olga (born 16 February 1856), Serhiy (born 13 September 1859), and Dmitry (born 10 September 1863).

=== Death ===
In February 1892 he fell ill with influenza, which was further complicated by pneumonia. He died on 3 March 1892, and was then buried at Baikove Cemetery. The funeral and burial was done by Petro Lebedyntsev, Archpriest of the Cathedral of St. Volodymyr.

== Honours and awards ==
- Order of Saint Stanislaus, 1st class
- Order of Saint Anna, 1st class
- Order of Saint Vladimir, 2nd class
- Order of Saint Alexander Nevsky
- Honorary citizen of Kyiv
- Kravaievska street (until 1920)
- Karavayevi Dachi (residential area of Kyiv)
