= Lev Medved =

Soviet medical worker

Lev Ivanovich Medved (Russian: Лев Иванович Медведь, Ukrainian: Левко Іванович Медведь; 18 June 1905 – 22 February 1982) was a Soviet medical worker. He is the founder and former head of the Institute of Ecohygiene and Toxicology. He was a professor of the USSR Academy of Medical Sciences, and Honored Scientist of the Ukrainian SSR (1961).

== Career ==
- In 1927, he graduated from the Vinnitsa Chemical and Pharmacological Institute (now Vinnytsia National Medical University. N. I. Pirogov).
- In 1939, he graduated from Kyiv Medical Institute (now Bogomolets National Medical University).
- From 1941 to 1945, he was director of the Kyiv Medical Institute.
- From 1947 to 1952 he was Minister of Health of the Ukrainian SSR.
- In 1964, he started and headed the Institute of Ecohygiene and Toxicology until his death in 1982.

== Awards ==
- Order of Lenin (1948)
- Order of the Red Banner of Labour
- Order of the Red Star
- Two Orders of the Badge of Honour
