= Transport in Kyiv =

Transportation infrastructure in Kyiv, Ukraine

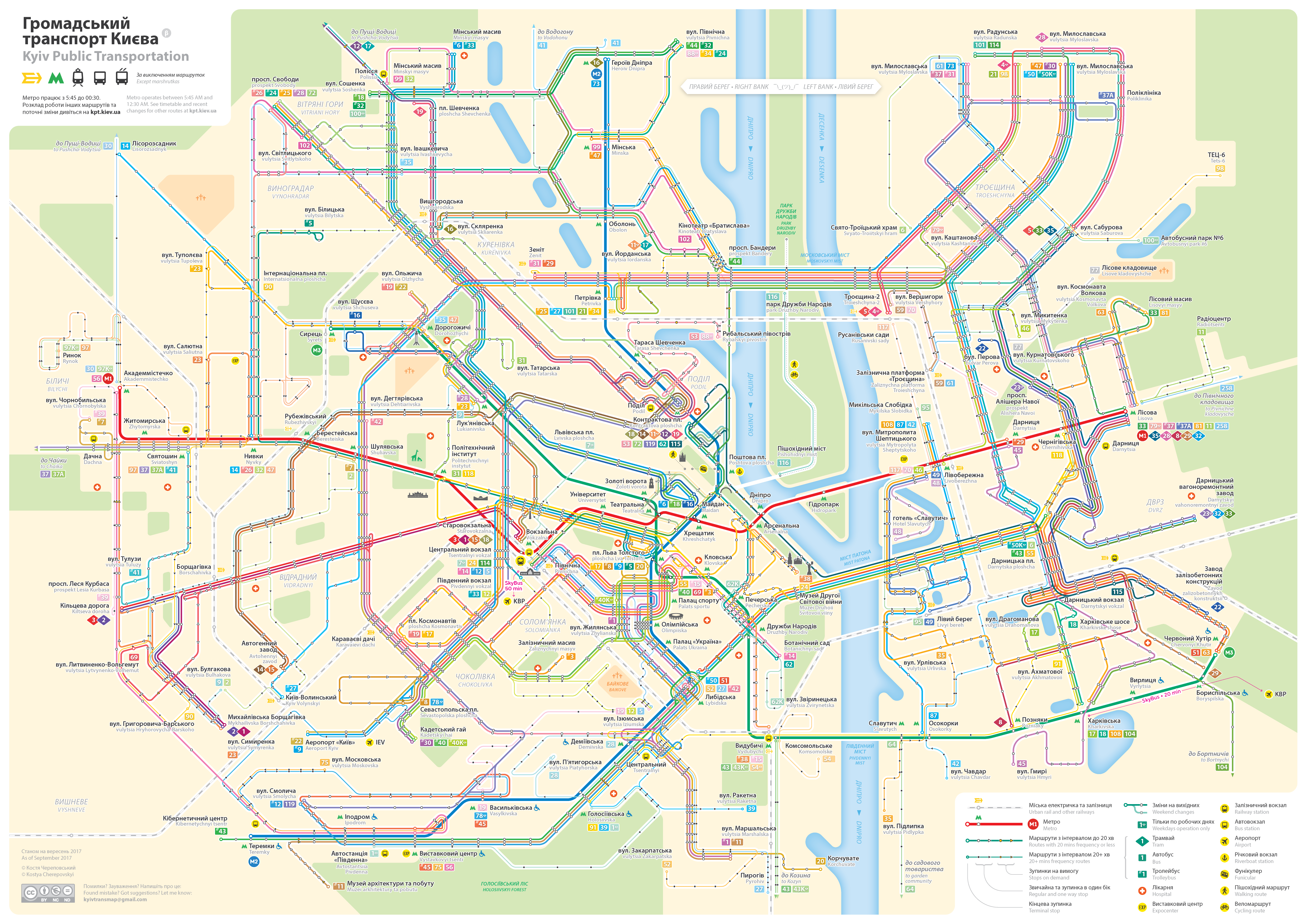
Unofficial transit map of Kyiv featuring urban rail, metro, tram, bus and trolleybus routes

Kyiv, the capital of Ukraine, has an extensive and rapidly developing transportation infrastructure serving local public needs and facilitating external passenger and cargo traffic.

== Local public transport ==
Public transportation includes metro, bus, trolleybus, and tram lines, as well as a funicular. All public transport is operated by Kyivpastrans, besides the metro. The city's first references to public transportation date back to the 1880s, when the city introduced omnibuses and was looking for investment in horse-drawn trams. The Kyiv Urban Electric Train is a joint project of Kyivpastrans and Ukrzaliznytsia. Kyivpastrans rarely operate minibuses.

=== Kyiv Metro ===
The publicly owned and operated Kyiv Metro offers a convenient network covering most of the city. The metro is expanding towards the city limits to meet growing demand.

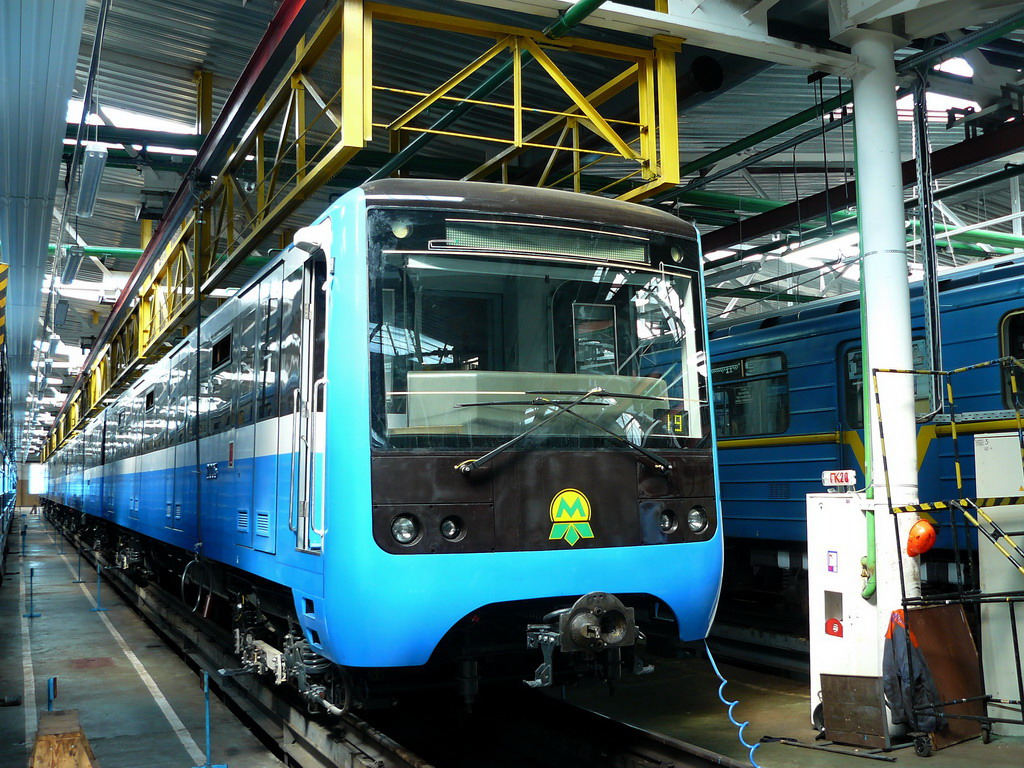
Metro train at the depot

The Kyiv Metro is the city’s primary mode of intracity transportation. It was the first rapid transit system in Ukraine. The system has three lines, with a total length of 66.1 kilometres (41.1 miles), and 51 stations.

The metro carries an average of 1.422 million passengers daily, 38 percent of Kyiv's public transport.

In 2011, the total number of trips exceeded 519 million. The metro is also home to the second-deepest station in the world: Arsenalna, at 105.5 m or 346 ft in the ground.

=== Kyiv Tram ===
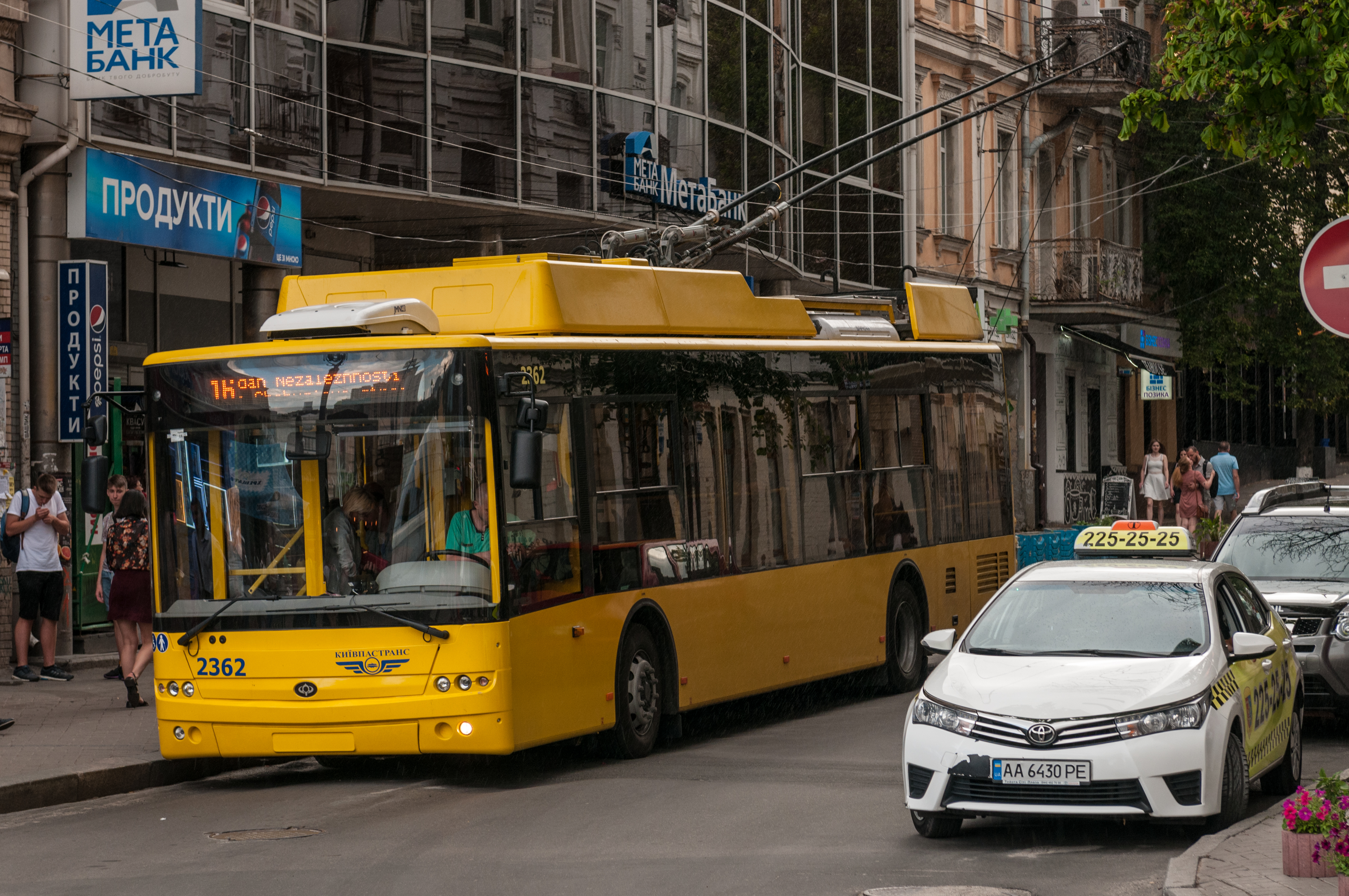
Trolleybus No 16 in Maidan Nezalezhnosti

The Kyiv Tram, the oldest in Eastern Europe, was for a long time being replaced by buses and trolleybuses, however, the trend is partially being reversed with the redevelopment of the Kyiv Fast Tram as well as planned investments in the classic tram network.

=== Kyiv Trolleybus ===
The Kyiv Trolleybus is the largest of its kind in the world in terms of line length and has many routes spanning the entire city.

=== Popular routes ===
One of the most popular and useful routes for tourists is bus No 24 (24A on weekends and holidays), travelling through Kyiv Passenger Railway Terminal, Khreshchatyk, European Square and the Kyiv Pechersk Lavra.

== Kyiv Urban Rail ==
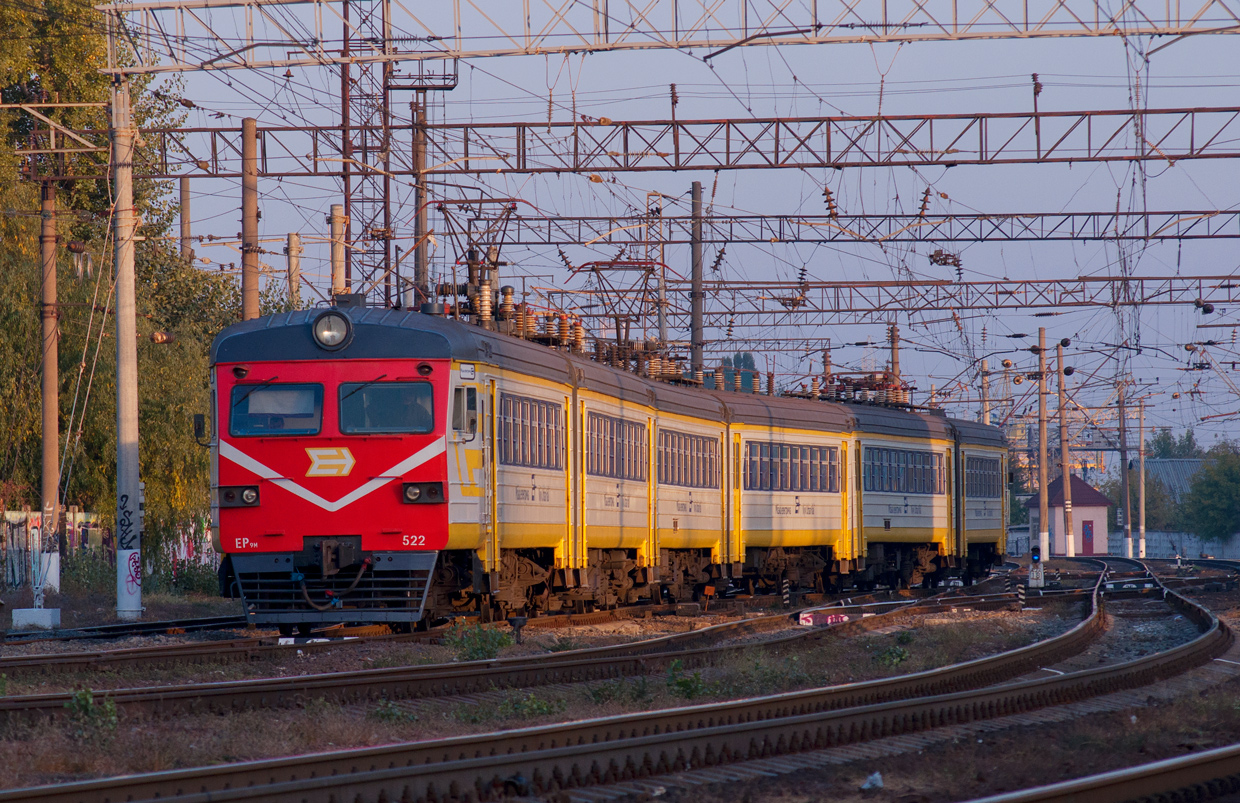
Kyiv city trains operated by Kyivpastrans

In 2010, Kyiv Urban Electric Train service began, running at four to ten minute intervals throughout the day around the city centre and serving many of Kyiv's inner suburbs. There are many stops with transfers to the Kyiv Metro.

In 2019, the city train operated only in rush hours from 07:00–10:00 and 16:00–20:00. Trains were very often cancelled or delayed. As a rule every day more than 40% of the rides were cancelled.

== Transport to airports ==
Passengers can get from Zhuliany Airport by trolleybus No 9 to Kyiv Passenger Railway Terminal and Palace of Sports, near the centre of the city. Passengers can get from Boryspil Airport by the Kyiv Boryspil Express. One ride costs ₴80. Tickets are available in ticket machines in the airport and from a train conductor.

== Fare ==
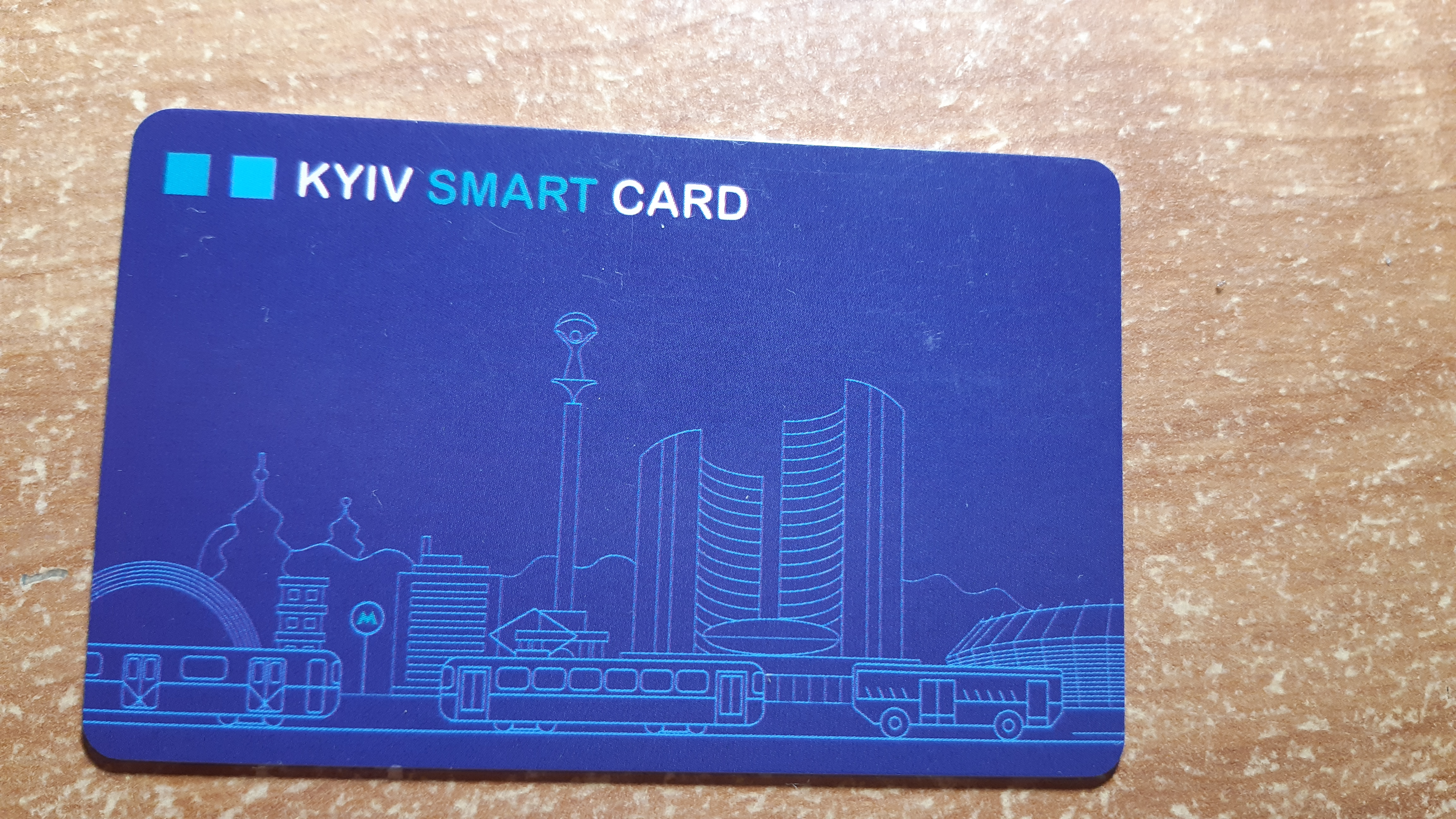
Kyivsmartcard

There are no timed tickets for public transport in Kyiv. Each ride should be paid for on each bus, trolleybus, tram, or metro. Passengers can pay for their ride by tapping Apple / Google Pay on their phone, using the Kyiv Digital app, Kyiv Digital plastic card, or a paper ticket with a QR code. One can buy tickets on the internet and just validate them from a smartphone screen or buy them in a ticket machine, located at metro stations or some vendors.

In buses, trams and trolleybuses operated by Kyivpastrans, one ride costs ₴30. These prices are the same in the metro.

1 ride costs ₴30

10 rides cost ₴28.90 (per ride)

50 rides cost ₴25 (per ride)

The penalty for travelling without a ticket is ₴600.

One Kyivsmartcard costs ₴96 and should be activated before use.

== River transport ==
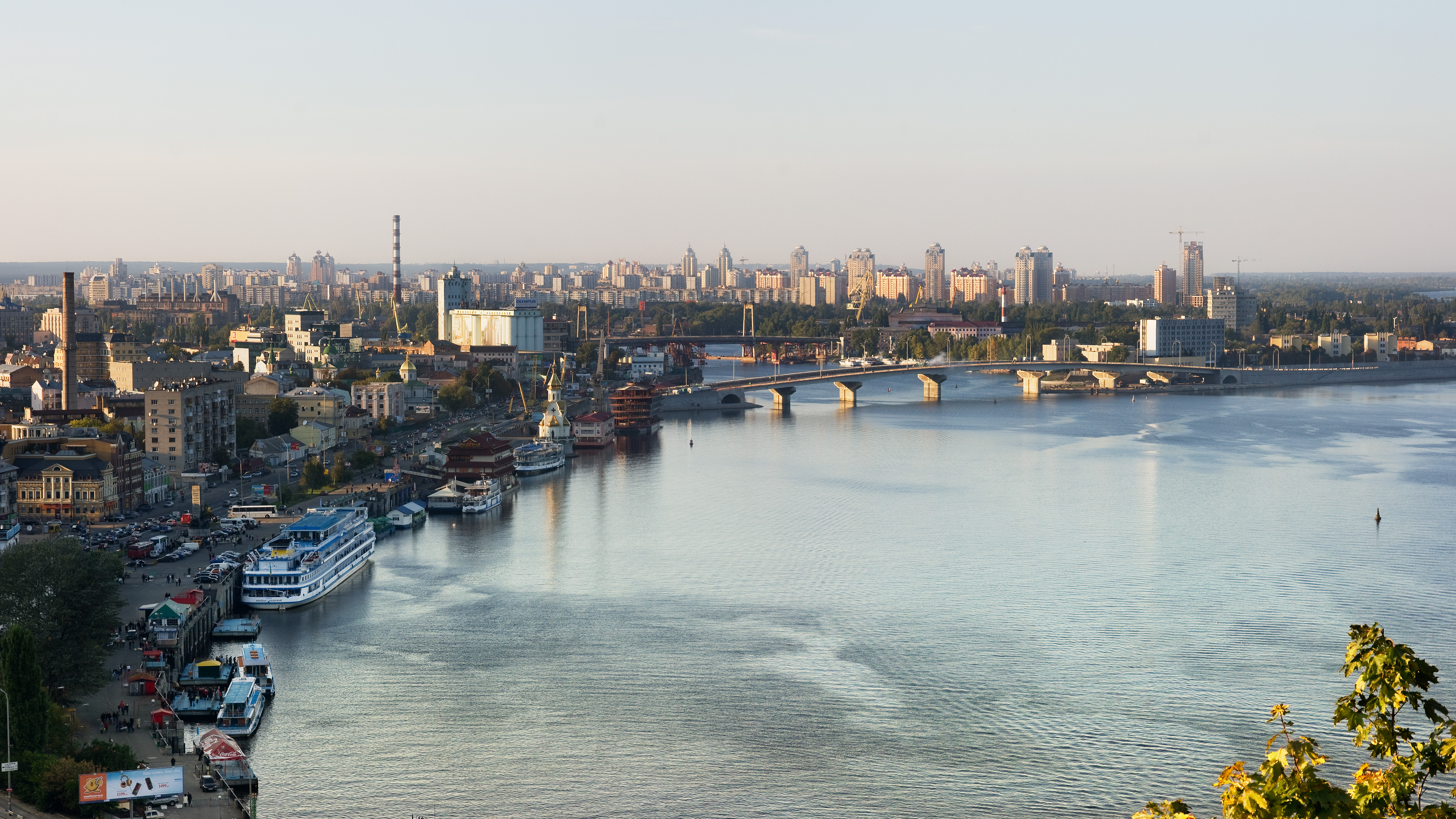
Port of Kyiv

The previously extensive Kyiv River Port riverboat service along the Dnipro River with the Meteor and Raketa hydrofoil ships is no longer available, limiting Kyiv's river transport to cargo and tour boats and private pleasure craft.

== Road ==
Kyiv is a crossing point for many of Ukraine's main roads. The focal point of the Ukrainian national-road system, Kyiv is linked by road to many of Ukraine's principal cities. The M05 (linking Kyiv with Odesa) and the M06 (linking the city with Chop) have been reconstructed.

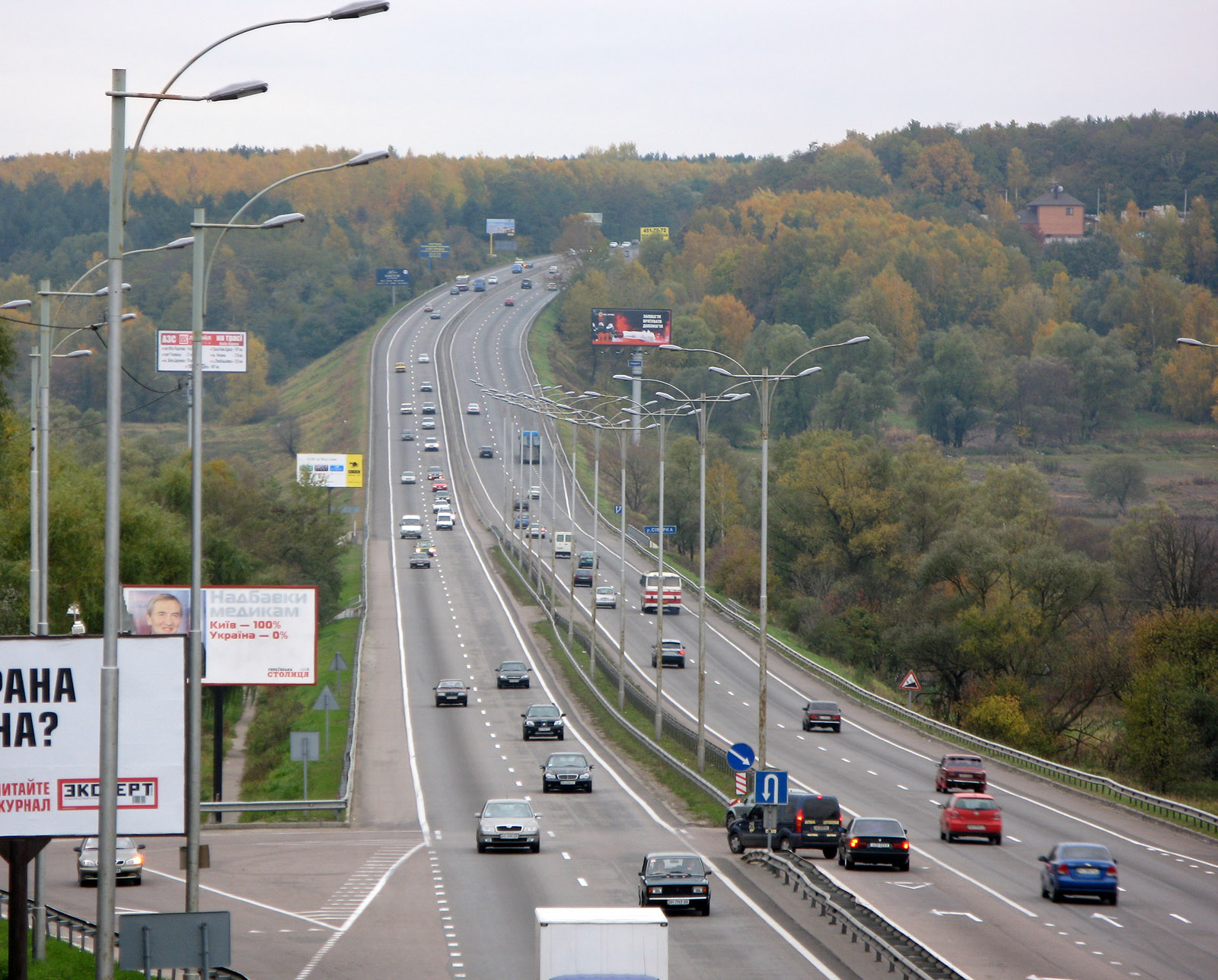
Section of the E95-M05 highway near Kyiv

Without a grade-separated ring road, Kyiv has two urban bypass routes. The Central Ring (Small Bypass Road) comprises a number of interconnecting, high-capacity roads encircling the city centre, with a full circular route on both banks of the Dnieper, and is congested at rush hour. The Big Bypass Road has no river crossings, and is confined to the city's right bank. Despite this, it reduces traffic in the city centre.

Many Kyiv roads are in bad condition, and maintenance is poor. According to Kyivavtodor (the municipal road corporation), 80 percent of the city's road surfaces have been in use for 15 to 30 years, 1.5 to 3 times more than the standard 12-year lifespan.

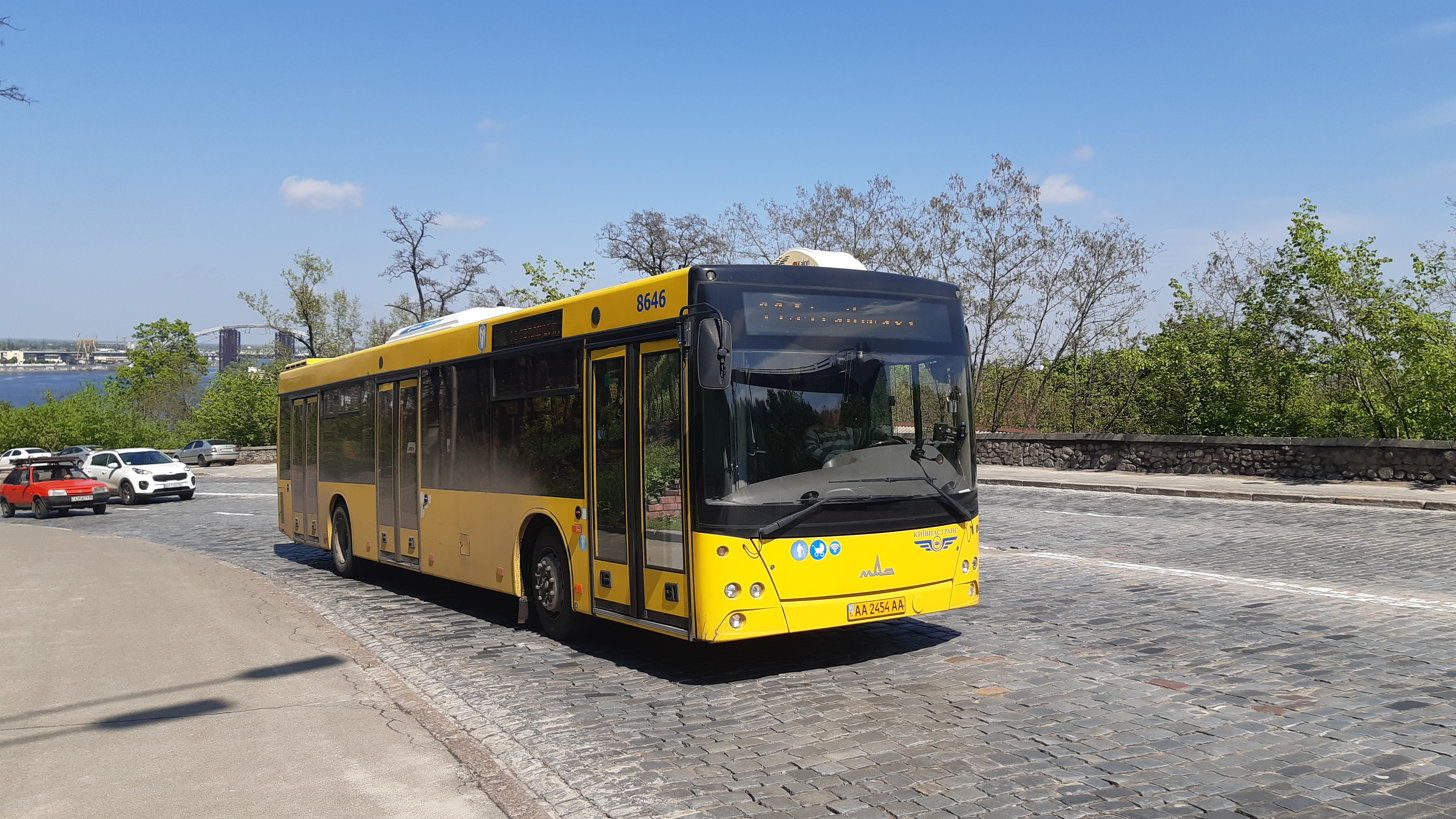
Kyiv municipal bus on route 114. Operated by Kyivpastrans (municipal)

The taxi market in Kyiv is poorly regulated (in particular, the fare per kilometer) and there is brisk competition among private companies. Many allow the scheduling of a pickup by telephone. Private citizens with cars provide taxi service on an ad hoc basis, generally by picking up people hailing a cab. Traffic congestion and a lack of parking space are problems for Kyiv taxis. Regulations allow parking on sidewalks, which inconveniences pedestrians.

The funicular climbs the Dnieper's right bank, carrying 10,000–15,000 passengers daily. The city has a long-distance passenger station, six cargo stations and repair facilities.

== Airports ==
Air passengers arrive in Kyiv at one of two airports: Boryspil Airport (served by international airlines) or Zhuliany Airport.

Some of the airlines operating in Boryspil (KBP) are Ukrainian, Ryanair, Austrian, Air France, KLM, Skyup, Qatar, Pegasus, British Airways, Turkish airlines, Air Baltic, etc.

Companies operating in Zhuliany airport (IEV) are WIZZ Air, Vueling, Ernest, Motor Sich, LOT, Alitalia, Belavia, etc.

Hostomel Airport is in the Kyiv northwestern suburb of Hostomel, and primarily serves as a cargo airport.

== See also ==
- Bridges in Kyiv
- Dnieper River
- History of Kyiv
- Subdivisions of Kyiv
- Transport in Ukraine
