= Elena Teplitskaya =

Ukrainian psychologist

- Born: Elena Iosipovna Teplitskaya; 4 September 1916; Zhmerinka Vinnitsa region, Ukraine
- Died: 1998 (aged 81–82)
- Education: Kyiv Medical Institute
- Occupations: psychologist, teacher, medical doctor
- Known for: published some 50 papers on the problems of mental retardation and other pathologies
- Notable work: see Bibliography (partial)

Elena Iosipovna Teplitskaya (1916–1998) was a Ukrainian psychologist, teacher and medical doctor.

== Life ==
Teplitskaya was born on 4 September 1916, in C. Zhmerinka Vinnitsa region. She entered Kyiv Medical Institute, finishing in 1938. In December 1938, she began postgraduate study at the Department of Pathologic Physiology of the second Kyiv Medical Institute. She died in 1998 at age 82.

== Career ==
=== Military ===
From the first days of the World War II Teplitskaya went to the front. She was heavily injured during the defense of Kerch. She worked in the Kemerovo hospital (1942). She took part in the hostilities at the Leningrad front. She was a career surgeon in front line hospitals (1944). She served in the Far East (1945-1946). She was awarded the Great Patriotic War degree. After the war, from 1946 to 1948 years, she served in the Kyiv military garrison.

=== Research ===
After demobilization in September 1948, Teplitskaya worked in the Institute of Physiology laboratories as a senior researcher. She started her dissertation on the theme: "Fatigue and recovery processes in groups of small muscles activity". She received her scientific degree of Candidate of Medical Sciences from the Lviv State Medical Institute in 1953.

Her primary research was devoted to human activity. She studied fatigue and the restorative influence of rest in the context of various types of manual labor (typing, playing piano, work at a confectionery factory). She concluded that restoration of the ability after a work day had a wavy character and depends on the complexity and diversity of movement. Successfully defending her thesis in March 1954, she worked on higher nervous activity of the P. Pavlova psychiatric hospital while teaching at the department of psychopathology and correctional institute named. M. Gorkogo.

She studied questions of formation and dynamics of purposeful movements. Describing the process of practical activity of intellectually disabled students, she drew attention to lack of coordination of their movements as a specific feature of their motor areas. She highlighted four development stages: motor skills, pace and rhythm; purposeful actions and dynamics of coordination of movements.

Another important topic was psychopathology and psychiatry, in particular research on schizophrenia. The author observed much higher nervous activity in such patients, studied the conscious and subconscious, neurochemical processes, mechanisms of "етіопатогенез" schizophrenia, principles of social adaptation, verbal reaction, dissociative manifestations, behavior, adaptation/re-adaptation and the speed of behavioral reactions and pathological changes from schizophrenia.

Her thesis was on the Settings of the time of motion and verbal reactions in experimental schizophrenia survey. She consulted for professor V. M. Banshchyrov and E. I. Boyko.

She studied the views of other psychiatrists, including P. B. Hannushkina, E. Krepelina, S. Kosakova and V. P. Serbian. Hannushkin created a psychiatric school, experimentally studied hypnosis, analyzed psychoanalytic ideas and developed a doctrine of pathological character and psychopathic personality. Hannushkin believed in psychopathic personality, finding it distinct from healthy personalities and characterized by an inborn character and consistency of movement.

She presented "Some experimental confirmation of P.B. Hannushkins views on psychopathic personality", at a 1975 scientific conference, devoted to his 100th anniversary.

She published some 50 papers on the problems of mental retardation and other pathologies. In particular, she studied the higher nervous activity of intellectually disabled children, development of their nervous activity and the influence of emotion on intellectually disabled children. Telitskoi contributed to the methodology of teaching children with psychophysical development issues, as well as upgrades to correction-rehabilitation educational process in auxiliary schools.

She also worked on defectological science. She taught a course on "Fundamentals of defectology".

M.O. Suprun, referred to her strong impression on her students.

=== Teacher ===
In 1967 Teplitskaya switched to a teaching position at the department and correctional faculty and taught psychological and pedagogical disciplines including correctional, physiology, psychological and pedagogical diagnostics and pathological anatomy.

She taught material from S. D. Zabraman, I. Shvancara, B. V. Zejgarnyka, A. Beene, A. Anastazee and S. Freud. She spoke fluent English, and was able to incorporate English material in its original language.

=== Author ===
Teplitskaya published textbooks. In 1963 she published A brief guide to practical lessons and demonstrations of the course of Pathologic Anatomy, which contributed to students' practical research skills in pathophysiological and morphological processes, pathogenesis, as well as clinical disease manifestations. She coauthored a guide for students Labor studies in secondary school.

== Bibliography (partial) ==
- Processes of fatigue and recovery work group of small muscles: dis. on soisk. uch. step. cand. honey. Science / w/L: Lions.
- Short guide to practical exercises and demonstrations of pathological anatomy course.
- The speed of response in the experimental study bolnїh schizophrenia / On actual problems of experimental research response time w Tartu, 1969.
- By methodology of experimental research personal and typological characteristics of mentally ill AN SSSR, 1969. - 165–173.
- Time parameters of motor and verbal responses in an experimental schizophrenia: dis. on soisk. uch. step, Psychiatry "1969. w M. Mosk.
- Methodology of experimental research of personal and typological characteristics of mentally ill / Lacuna personality - 1970 - Volume 1
- On the role of the left and right frontal lobes and differentsiiorovanii verbal stimuli into logical categories / w A.I.Romodanov, 1980 - T. XXVI - No.4 - pp. 457–464.
- The impact on the perception of emotions in mentally retarded students / Vyp.13 - K., 1980.-S.45–50.
- Psychomotor activity in violation of the mind / Kiev: Health 167-176s.
- The development of practical activities of mentally retarded pupils / w VI Cooper, / ed. V.I.Bondarya. - By: Radyans'ka School, 1981. - On 16–50.
