= Square of Ukrainian Heroes =

Square in Kyiv, Ukraine

Coordinates: 50.4391°N 30.5161°E

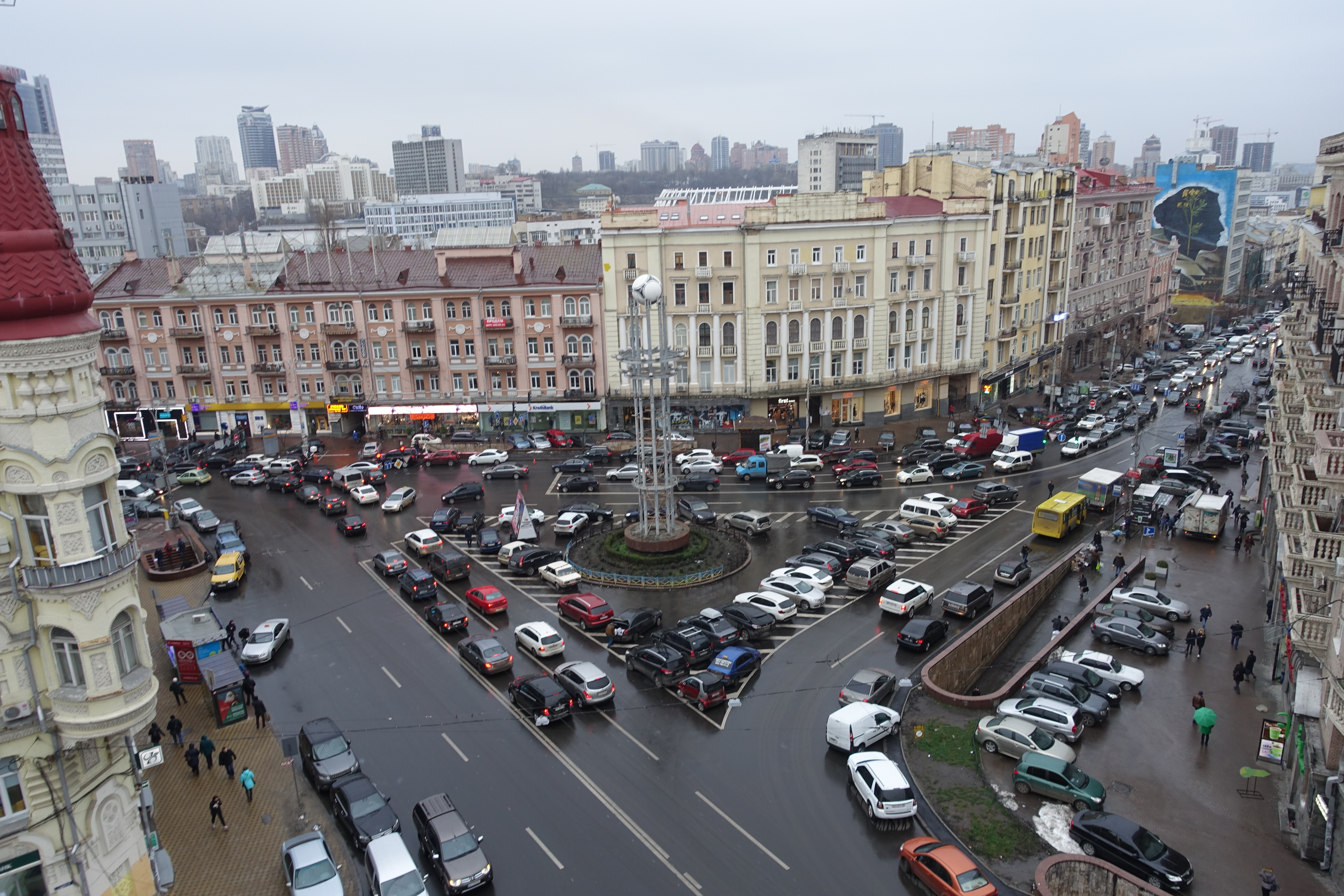
- The square in December 2017
- Interactive map of Square of Ukrainian Heroes
- Native name: Площа Українських Героїв (Ukrainian)
- Type: square
- Location: tripoint of Pecherskyi, Shevchenkivskyi and Holosiivskyi District; Kyiv, Ukraine

The Square of Ukrainian Heroes (Ukrainian: Площа Українських Героїв, romanized: Ploshcha Ukrainskykh Heroiv), is a city square in Kyiv, Ukraine formed by a triangle shaped intersection of three streets: Velyka Vasylkivska, Hetmana Pavla Skoropadskoho and Yevhena Chykalenka. The square gives its name to the Square of Ukrainian Heroes station, of the Kyiv Metro.

The square is a tripoint where Pecherskyi District, Shevchenkivskyi District and Holosiivskyi District meet.

== History ==
It was laid out at some point during the second half of the 19th century, originally unofficially known as Shuliavka Square from the erstwhile name of Skoropadskoho Street which led to a village of that name outside the city. In 1891 the street was renamed Kravaievska after prominent Kyiv doctor Volodymyr Karavayev and in 1920 Tolstoho after the Russian writer Leo Tolstoy. The square became known as Leo Tolstoy Square (Ukrainian: Площа Льва Толстого) in 1930's, but was officially renamed in 1938. Tolstoy had visited the city only once.

By the end of the 19th century the square started receiving typically urban architecture, most prominently a revenue house designed by famous architect Władysław Horodecki, at the present day address Velyka Vasylivska, 25. The building, constructed between 1887 and 1889, at five stories high, was at the time the largest residential building in Kyiv. However, it fell into disrepair during the Soviet period, and by 1937 it underwent emergency repairs, stripping it of its neorenaissance and baroque decorations. It was further destroyed by the retreating Soviet soldiers in 1941 as part of their scorched earth policy after the start of the Eastern Front of World War II and rebuilt in 1948 in even simpler form.

In 1981 a metro station was opened under the square. At the beginning of the 1990s the Kyiv-Donbas business center was opened at Yevhena Chkalenka 42/4 as one of the first office centers in the city which came to be used as Ukrainian office of the Credit-Agricole bank.

The square acts as the end point for the Equality March, Ukraine's largest LGBTQ pride parade.

Following the start of the full-scale Russian invasion ongoing since 24 February 2022, on 23 March 2023, the square was officially renamed to Square of Ukrainian Heroes, commemorating the defenders of Ukraine.

== Gallery ==
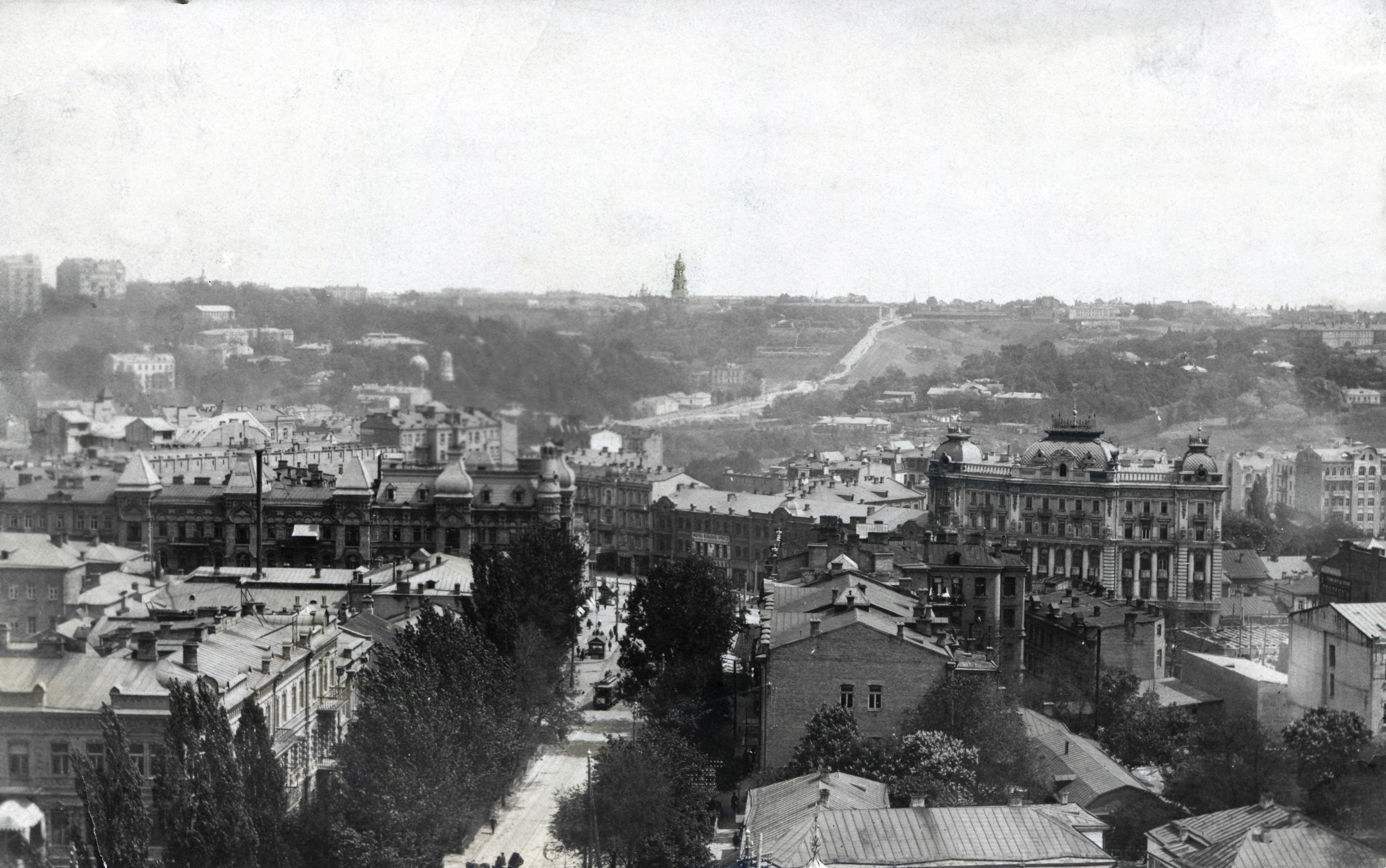
The square in 1914

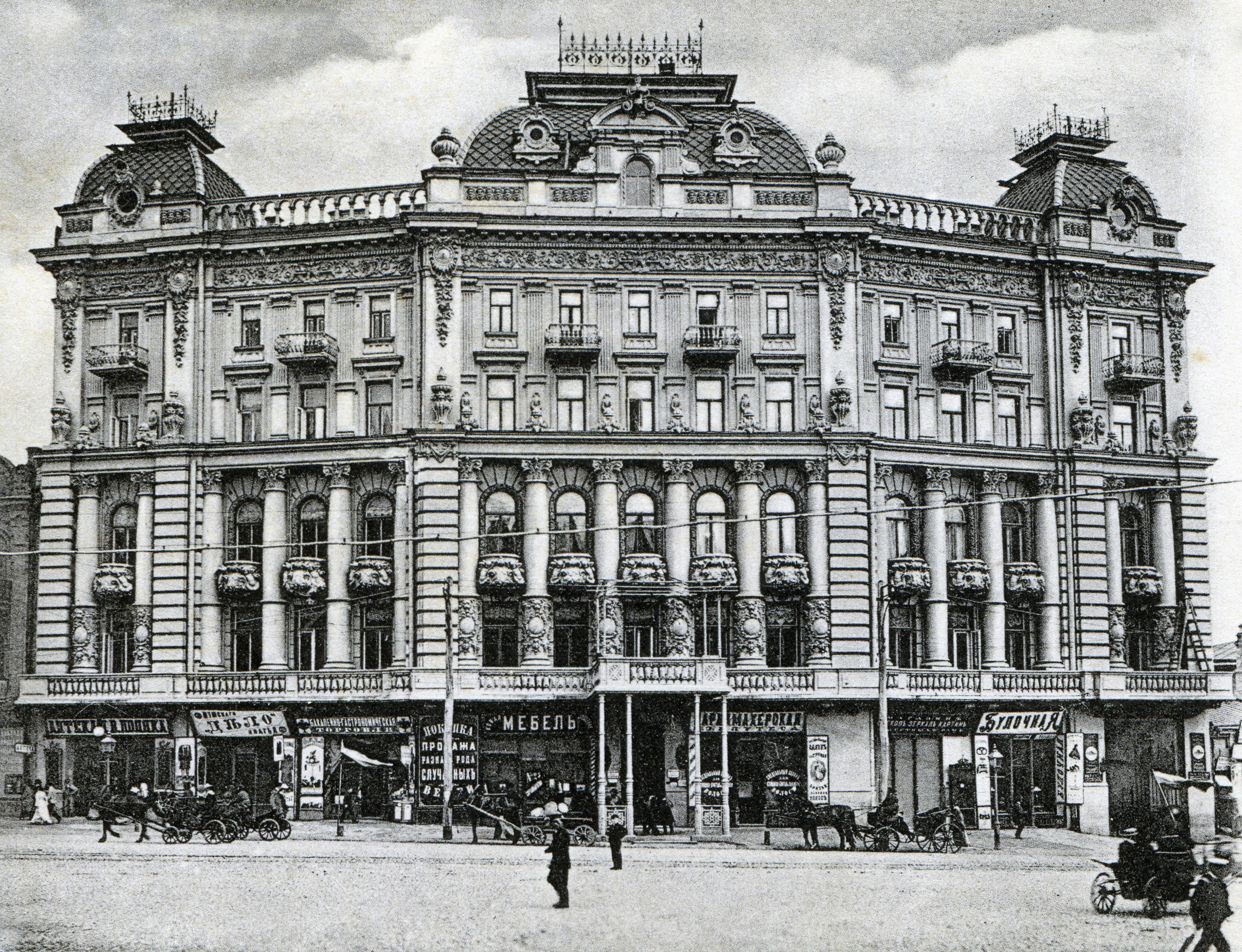
Revenue house on Velyka Vasylivska, 25 in 1904

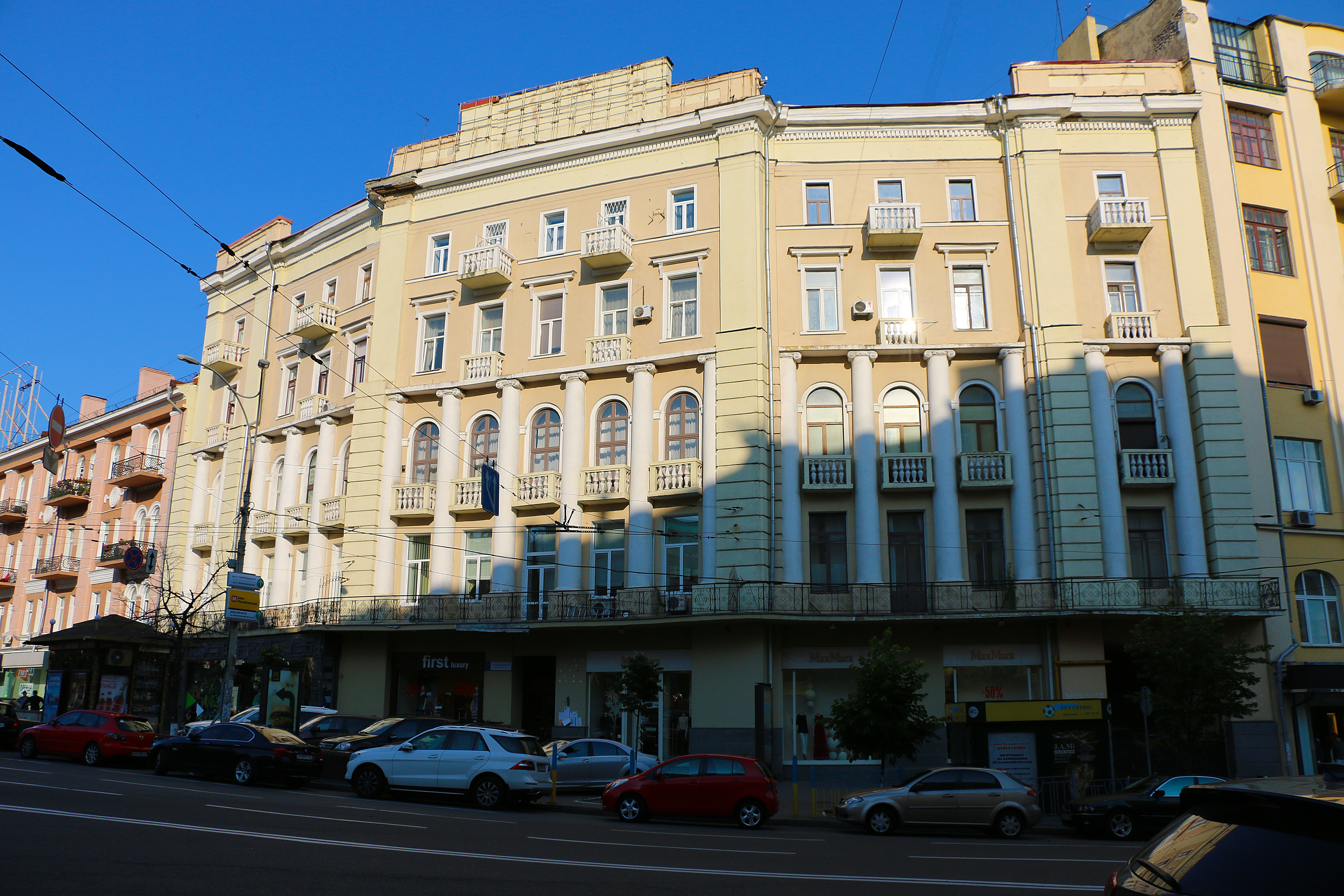
Present day shape in 2015
