= Bogomolets National Medical University =

Public medical university in Kyiv, Ukraine

Bohomolets National Medical University
- Національний Медичний Університет Імені О.О.Богомольця
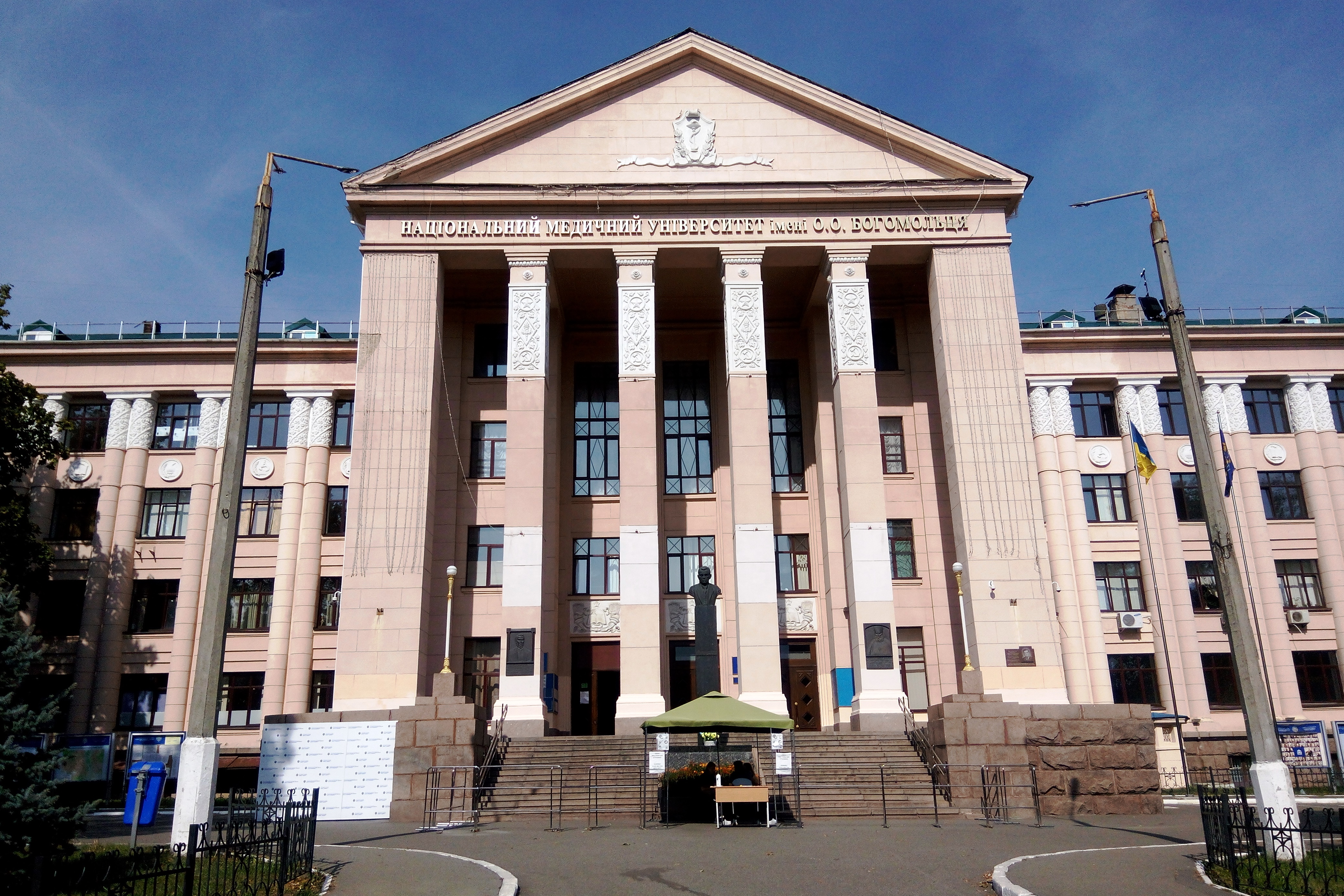
- Main building of the university
- Motto: "Честь, Милосердя, Слава"
- Motto in English: "Honor, Mercy, Glory"
- Type: Public university
- Established: 1841
- Accreditation: Ministry of Education and Science of Ukraine
- Rector: Yuri Kuchin
- Academic staff: 1,200
- Undergraduates: Medical Faculty №1, Medical Faculty №2, Medical Faculty №3, Dental Faculty, Faculty of Medical Psychology, Faculty of Pharmacy, Faculty for training physicians for Armed Forces of Ukraine
- Postgraduates: Medicine, Pediatrics, Medical psychology, Stomatology, Pharmacy, Public health
- Doctoral students: Medicine, Pediatrics, Medical psychology, Stomatology, Pharmacy, Public health
- Location: Kyiv, Ukraine
- Campus: Urban
- Language: English, Ukrainian
- Colors: Blue
- Website: nmuofficial.com/en/

The Bogomolets National Medical University (abbr. NMU) is a medical school founded in 1841 in Kyiv, Russian Empire by the Russian Tsar Nicolas I. The university is named after physiologist Oleksandr Bogomolets. NMU provides medical training for over 10,000 students, including about 1,300 foreigners from 56 countries. The university employs about 1,200 teaching staff.

Bogomolets National Medical University is one of the best medical universities in Ukraine. The degree of the university is recognized by the world's most credible organizations like WHO, UNESCO, MCI. It offers various courses in undergraduate and post-graduate levels to students. The university consists of 10 faculties. Bogomolets National Medical University also has a separate Institute for Post Graduate Education. The university is a pioneer in training medical specialists and research personnel in the field of healthcare. Bogomolets National Medical University has around 1500 professors. Included in the numbers are 855 Phd and 205 Doctors of Sciences. Thus, the students are trained by expert professionals and academicians in the field of medicine.

== History ==
Bogomolets National Medical University originated from a small group of students and teachers of the medical faculty of St. Volodymyr University in 1841. In 1840, an Imperial Decree was signed to establish a medical faculty at St. Volodymyr University. Teaching began in 1841, with 29 students admitted to the first year. The official start of classes was September 9 in the old style (September 23 in the new style). The Medical Faculty of St. Vladimir University had 10 departments. In 1844, three faculty clinics were opened: therapeutic, surgical, and obstetric.

== Alumni ==
- 1860: Vladimir Betz, anatomist, histologist and professor
- 1884: Danylo Zabolotny (1866-1922), pioneer in microbiology
- 1925: Favst Shkaravsky, was an officer, physician and forensic expert in the Soviet army during World War II
- 1946: Isaac Trachtenberg, member of National Academy of Sciences of Ukraine
- Maryna Poroshenko, First Lady of Ukraine
- 1989: Olga Bogomolets, singer, songwriter, physician, and presidential candidate
- Oleh Musiy, Minister of Healthcare
- Elena Teplitskaya, doctor, psychologist and academic
- Maryana Bezuhla, doctor, politician
- Serhiy Dyachenko, psychiatrist, screenwriter, fantasy fiction writer and novelist

== See also ==
- List of universities in Ukraine
- List of medical universities in Ukraine
