= Holosiivskyi District =

Urban district in Kyiv, Ukraine

Coordinates: 50°20′20″N 30°33′15″E

Holosiivskyi District Голосіївський район
- Urban district in Kyiv
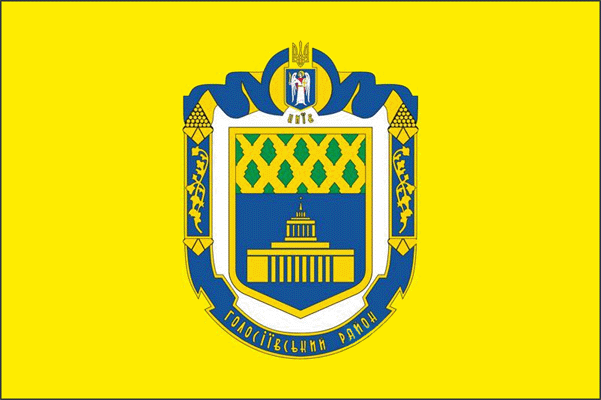
- Flag Coat of arms

- Interactive map of Holosiivskyi District
- Country: Ukraine
- Municipality: Kyiv Municipality

Government
  - Mayor: Serhiy Sadovoi

Area
  - Total: 156.35 km^{2} (60.37 sq mi)

Population
  - Total: 205,300
  - Density: 1,311/km^{2} (3,400/sq mi)
- Time zone: UTC+2 (EET)
  - Summer (DST): UTC+3 (EEST)
- Landmarks: Expocenter of Ukraine, National Museum of Folk Architecture and Folkways, Baikove Cemetery, Holosiivska Square, Holosiivska Street, National University of Life and Environmental Sciences of Ukraine, Holosiiv National Nature Park
- Metro stations: Teremky, Ipodrom, Vystavkovyi Tsentr, Vasylkivska, Holosiivska, Demiivska, Lybidska, Palats "Ukrayina", Olimpiiska
- Website: golos.kyivcity.gov.ua

Holosiivskyi District (Note: Ukrainian: Голосіївський район, romanized: Holosiivskyi raion) is an urban district of the city of Kyiv, the capital of Ukraine.

Holosiivskyi District was created during the change of administrative divisions of the capital of Ukraine, which was conducted in September 2001, as per the decision of the Kyiv City Council on January 1, 2001.

Holosiivskyi District is located in the southwestern part of Kyiv, bordering Shevchenkivskyi, Solomianskyi, Pecherskyi, and Darnytskyi districts of Kyiv, and Bucha, Obukhiv, and Boryspil raions of Kyiv Oblast.

The territory of the district begins from the Square of Ukrainian Heroes in the north and stretches toward the southwest of Kyiv. Considering this, the raion is somewhat like the southwest entrance into the city. The district consists of the following historical neighborhoods of Kyiv: Bahrynova Hora, Demiivka, Dobryi Shliakh, Feofaniia, Holosiiv, Koncha-Zaspa, Korchuvate, Kytaiv, Lysa Hora, Mysholovka, Nova Zabudova, Nyzhnia Telychka, Pankivshchyna, Predslavyno, Pyrohiv, Samburky, Saperna Slobidka, Shyrma, Teremky, Tserkovshchyna, Tsymbaliv Yar, Vita-Lytovska, Yamky, and Vodnykiv Island.

Holosiivskyi National Nature Park, Expocenter of Ukraine and the National Museum of Folk Architecture and Folkways of Ukraine are located in the district.

== Population ==
=== Language ===
Distribution of the population by native language according to the 2001 census:

Language	Number	Percentage
Ukrainian	151 475	75.93%
Russian	44 232	22.17%
Other (Note: Those who did not indicate their native language or indicated a language that was native to less than 1% of the local population.)	3 787	1.90%
Total	199 494	100.00%

== Gallery ==
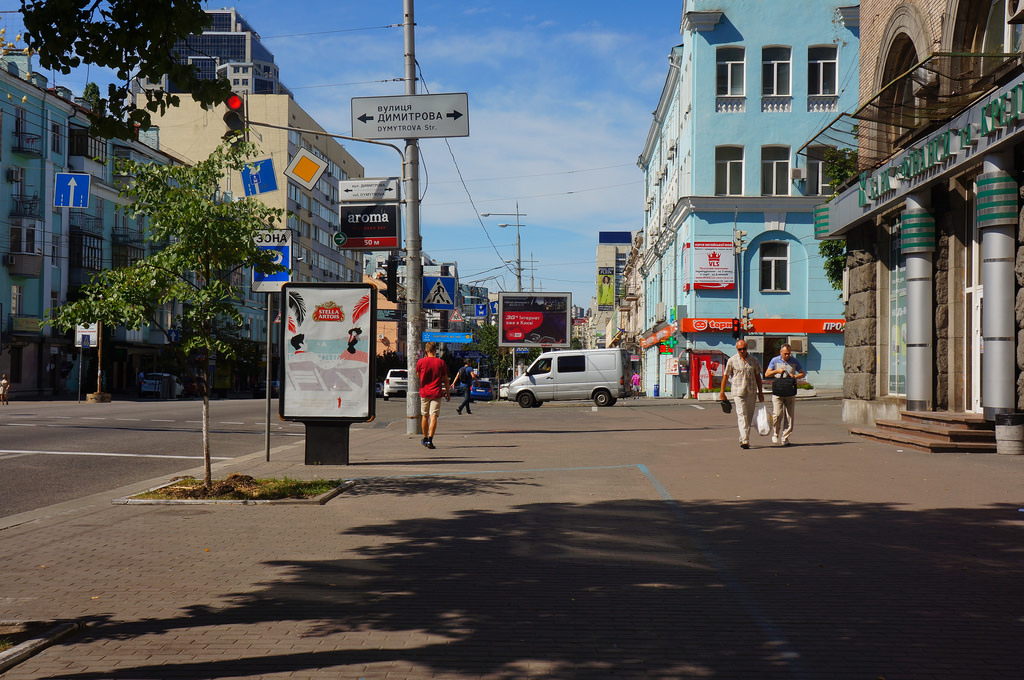
Velyka Vasylkivska Street in Holosiivsky District

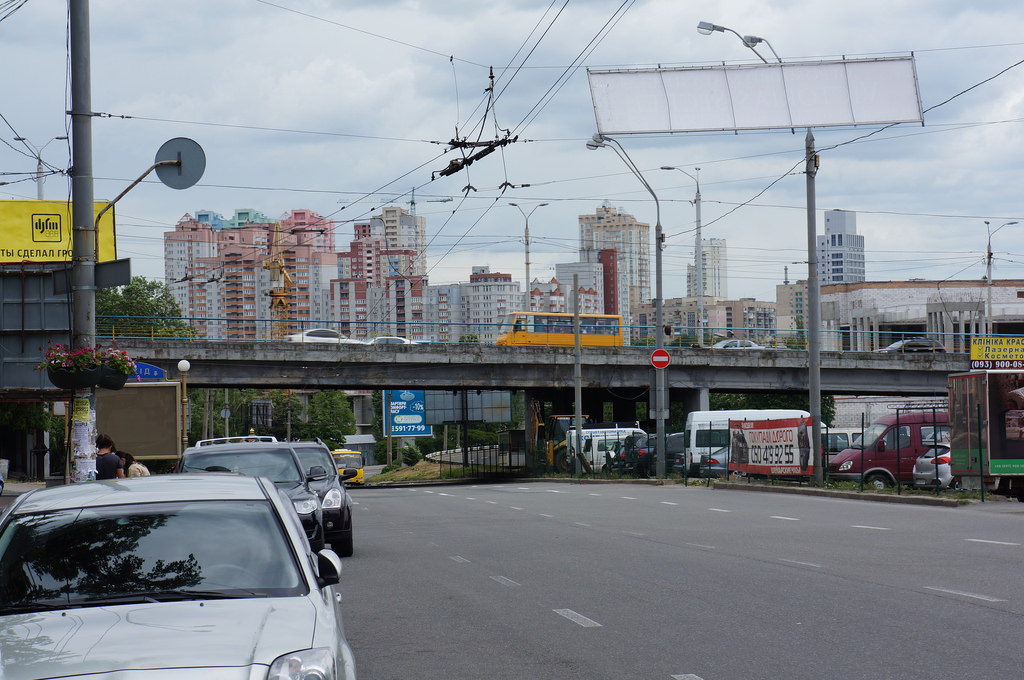
Traffic junction on Lybidska Square

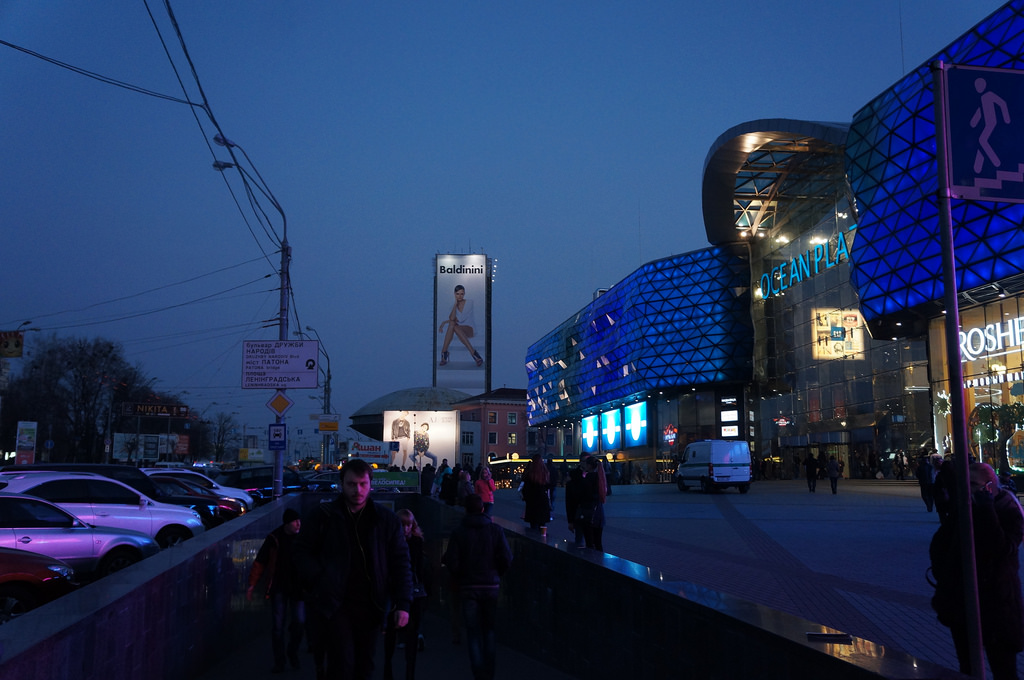
Entrance to Lybidska metro station

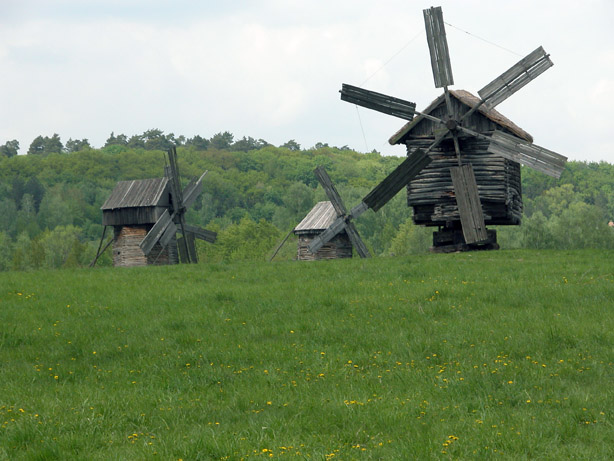
National Museum of Folk Architecture and Folkways of Ukraine in Pyrohiv
