= Holosiivska Street =

Street in Kyiv, Ukraine

- Interactive map of Holosiivska Street
- Native name: Голосіївська вулиця (Ukrainian)
- Length: 1,300 m (4,300 ft)
- Location: Southern Kyiv, Ukraine
- Postal code: 03 039
- Coordinates: 50°24′14″N 30°31′28″E

Holosiivska Street (Ukrainian: Голосіївська вулиця) is a street located in Holosiivskyi District of Kyiv, Ukraine. It runs from Nauky Avenue to Holosiivska Square and Holosiivskyi National Nature Park, and is named for the latter.

Holosiivska Street was built in the 19th century. It continued into the forest until the middle of 20th century. In 1970s the street was reconstructed.

During Russian invasion of Ukraine in 2022 and Battle of Kyiv, Holosiivska street suffered air strikes.

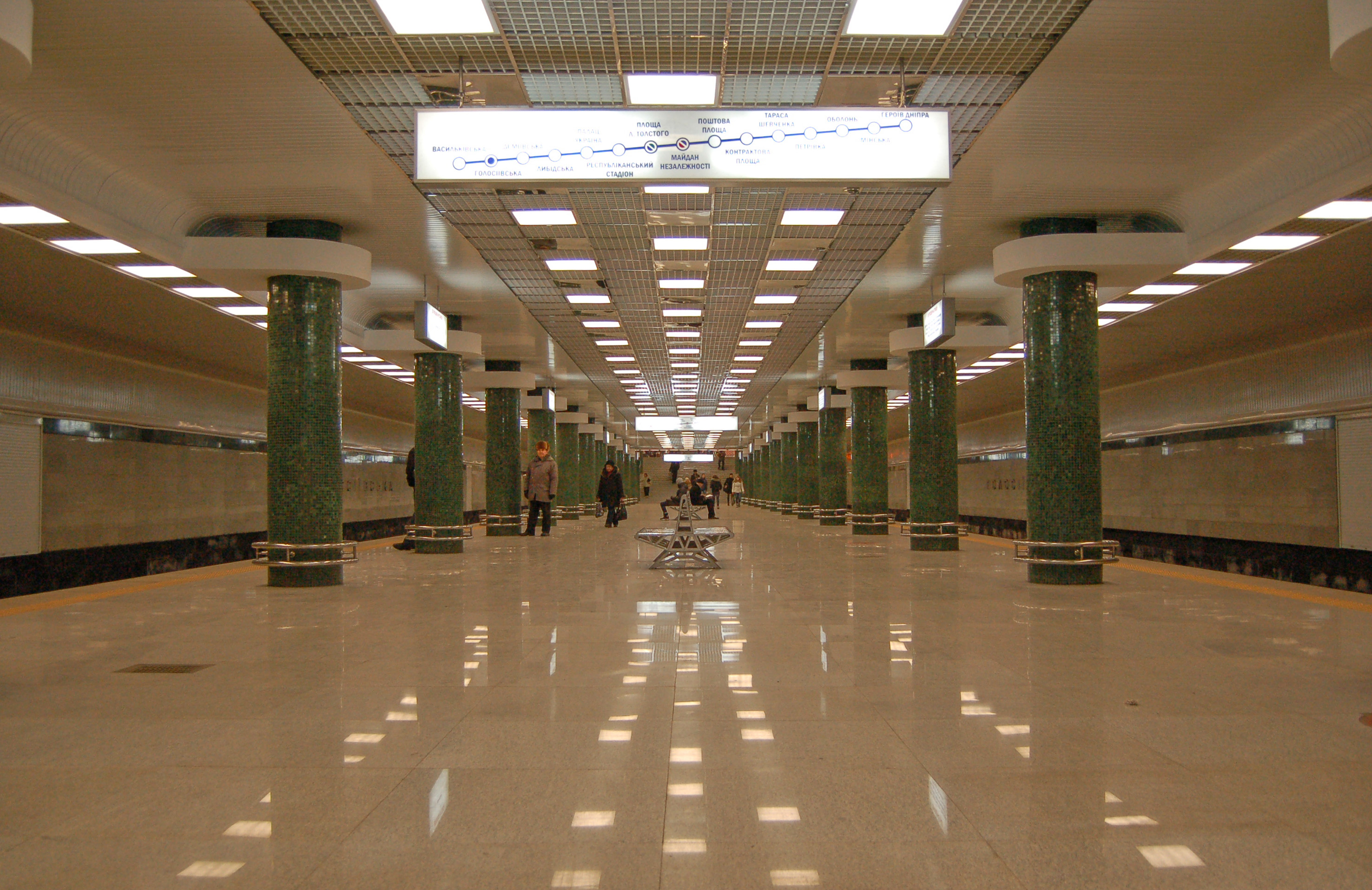
Holosiivska metro station lobby

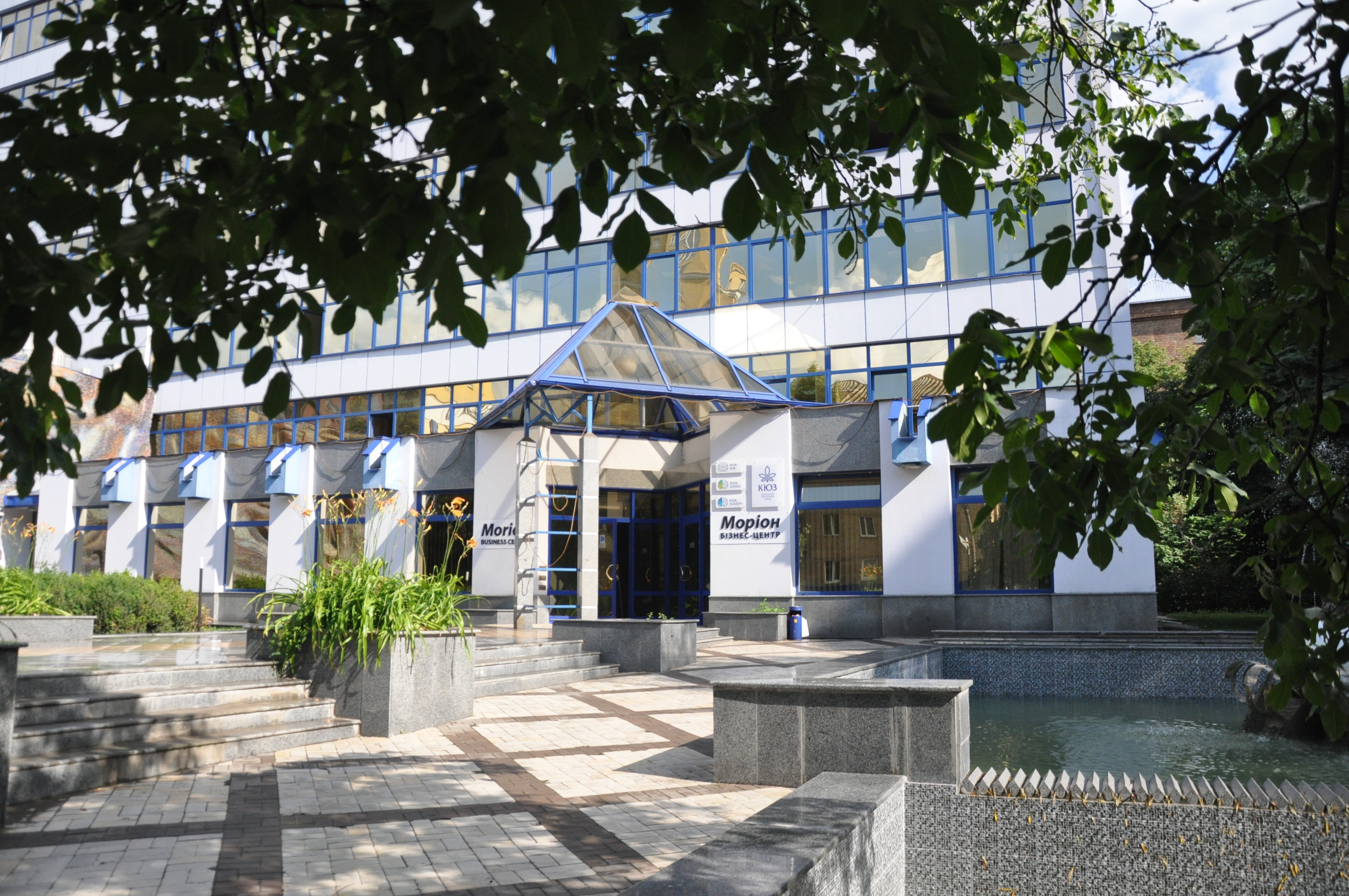
Holosiivska, 17 street

== Notable buildings ==
- Lyceum Nr. 241
- Police department of Holosiivsky District.
- Teatralny Hotel .

== Transport ==
Metro stations located near Holossivska street are Holosiivska and Demiivska.

== Sources ==
- Holosiivska Street on wek.kiev.ua (in Ukrainian)
- Голосіївська вулиця // Вулиці Києва. Довідник / за ред. А. В. Кудрицького. — К. : «Українська енциклопедія» ім. М. П. Бажана, 1995. — С. 53. — ISBN 5-88500-070-0. (in Ukrainian)
