= Demiivska (Kyiv Metro) =

Kyiv Metro station in Kyiv, Ukraine

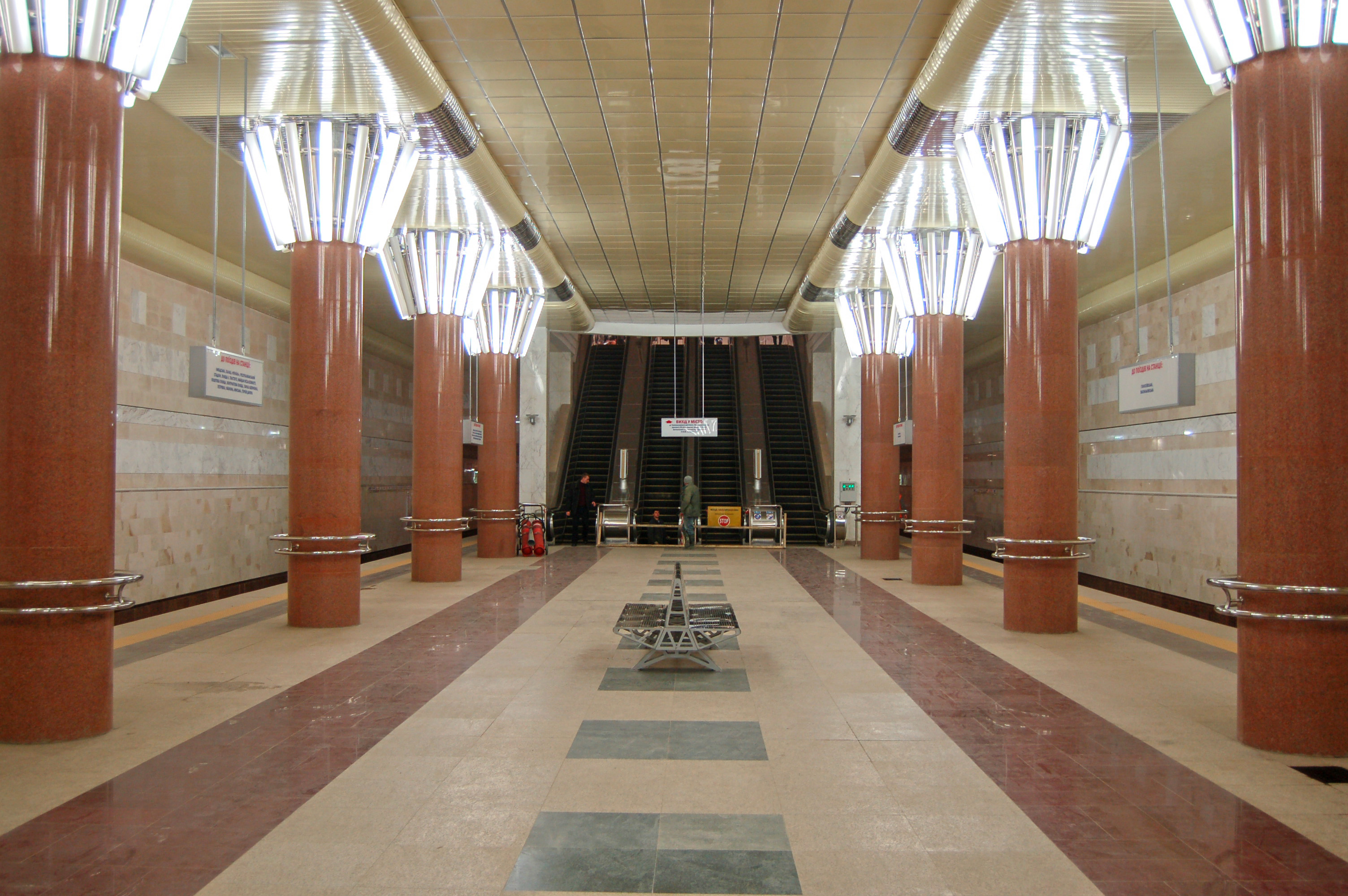
- Station hall

General information
- Location: Holosiivskyi District; Kyiv; Ukraine
- Coordinates: 50°24′17.25″N 30°31′00.60″E
- System: Kyiv Metro station
- Owner: Kyiv Metro
- Line: Obolonsko–Teremkivska line
- Platforms: 2
- Tracks: 2

Construction
- Structure type: underground
- Platform levels: 1

Other information
- Station code: 222

History
- Opened: 15 December 2010

Services
Preceding station	Kyiv Metro	Following station
Lybidska towards Heroiv Dnipra	Obolonsko–Teremkivska line	Holosiivska towards Teremky
Location

Demiivska (Ukrainian: Демiïвська,) is the first station on Kyiv Metro's Obolonsko–Teremkivska Line's Holosiiv-Teremky extension opened on 15 December 2010. The underground is situated on the Holosiivskyi Avenue in Kyiv. It serves the residential areas around, the major marketplace Demiivskyi Rynok, and the cities central intercity bus station.

== History ==
The station was due to open in late 2008. Later, Metro officials rescheduled the opening to March 2009. The opening was again postponed to Independence Day August 2009, but this date was also unmet. A trial run of a train took place on 5 November 2010. Finally the extension, including the station, opened on 15 December 2010.

== Design ==
Designed by architect Valeriy Gnevishev, the station features a typical pillar trispan with a new "flower" design on the pillars dominated by the red and beige palette. The station is built by cut-and-cover and has three levels, an underground waiting area and two escalators leading to two mezzanine levels before reaching the platform. Entrances are on both sides of the avenue.

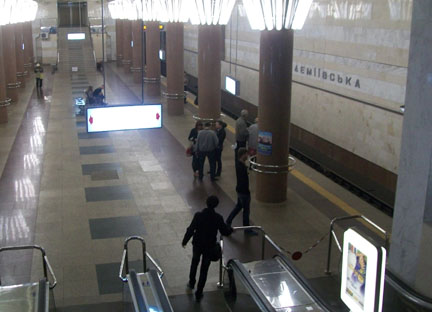
Demiivska view from escalator

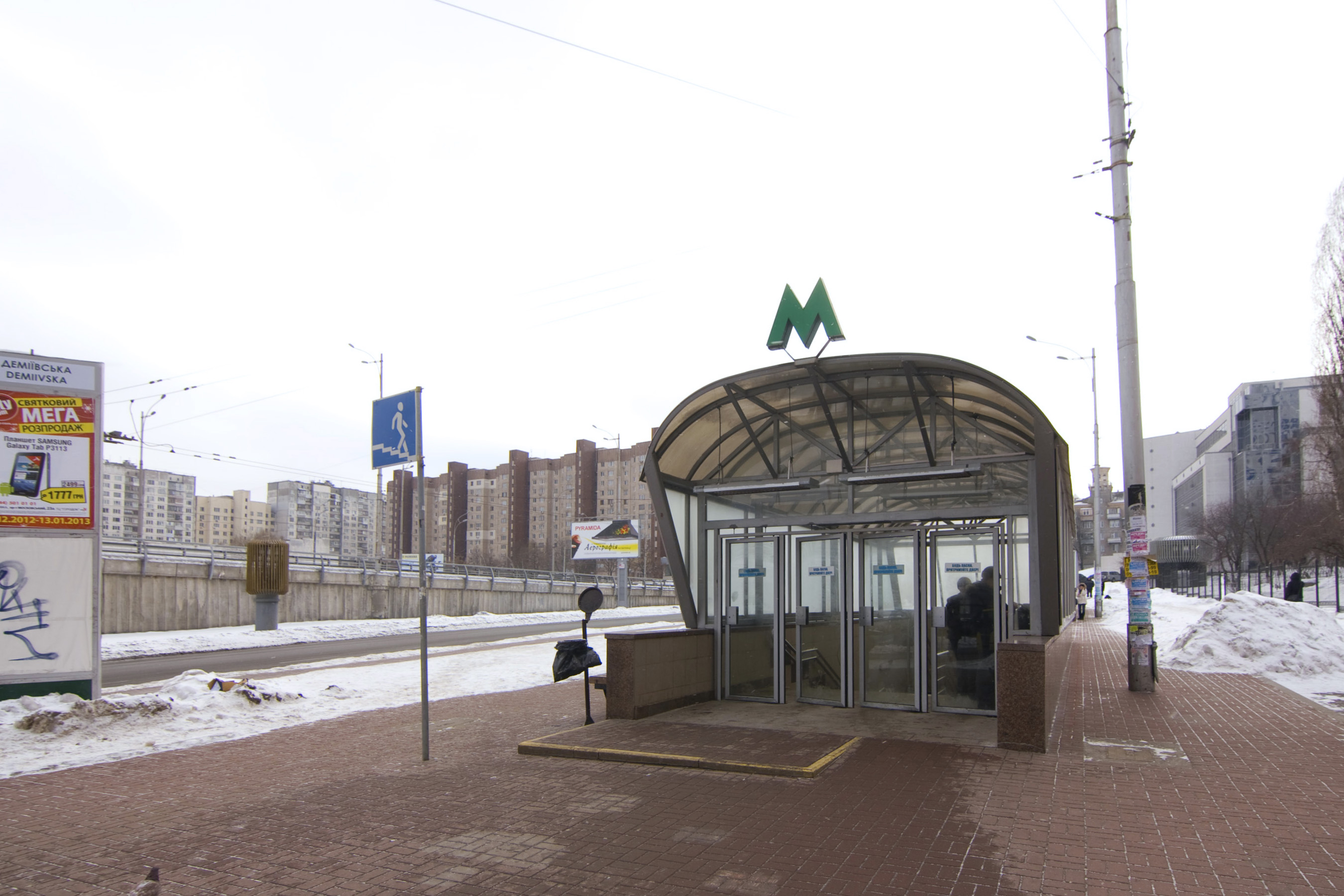
Station entrance
