= Holosiivska (Kyiv Metro) =

Kyiv Metro Station

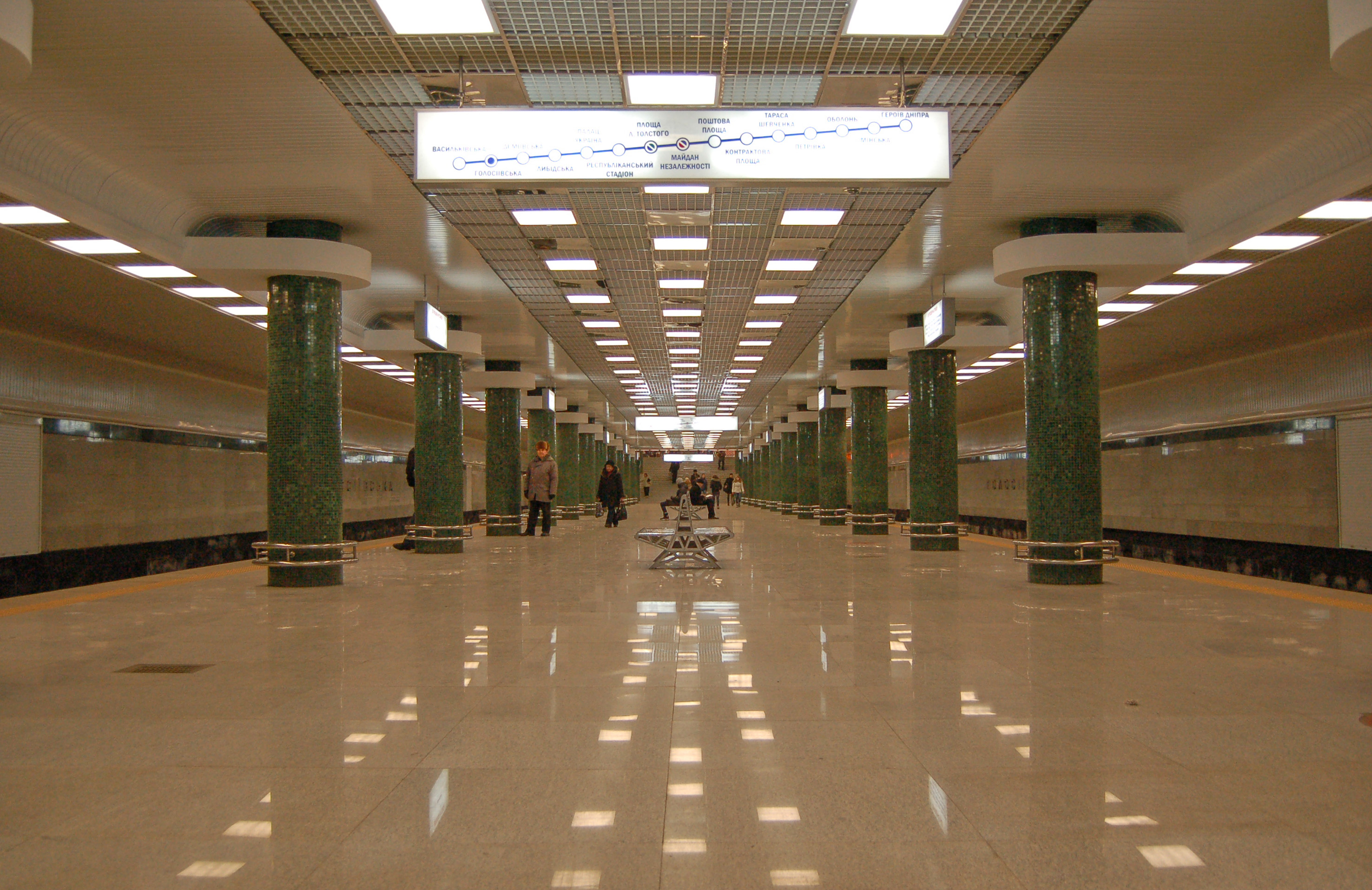

General information
- Location: Holosiivskyi District; Kyiv; Ukraine
- Coordinates: 50°23′51″N 30°30′30″E
- System: Kyiv Metro station
- Owner: Kyiv Metro
- Line: Obolonsko–Teremkivska line
- Platforms: 2
- Tracks: 2

Construction
- Structure type: underground
- Platform levels: 1

Other information
- Station code: 223

History
- Opened: 15 December 2010

Services
Preceding station	Kyiv Metro	Following station
Demiivska towards Heroiv Dnipra	Obolonsko–Teremkivska line	Vasylkivska towards Teremky
Location

Holosiivska (Ukrainian: Голосіївська,) is the second station on the Kyiv Metro's Obolonsko–Teremkivska Line's Holosiiv-Teremky extension in Kyiv, Ukraine. It opened on 15 December 2010. The station is situated in the Holosiiv Raion near the Holosiivska Square.

The station was due to open late 2008, and that opening was later rescheduled by Metro authorities to March 2009. It was again postponed to Independence Day August 2009. A trial run of a train took place on 5 November. Finally the extension opened on 15 December 2010.

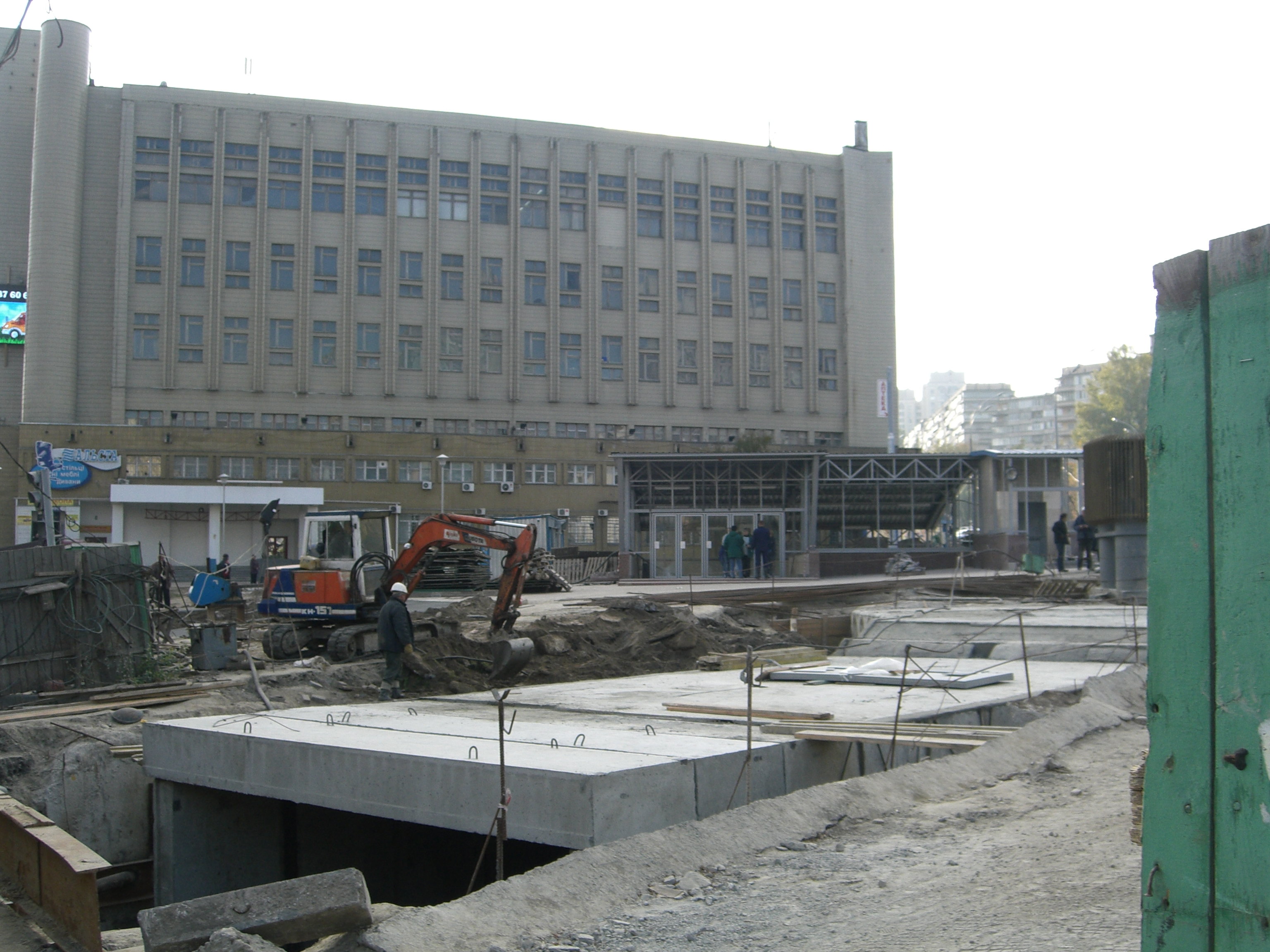
Station under construction, October 2010

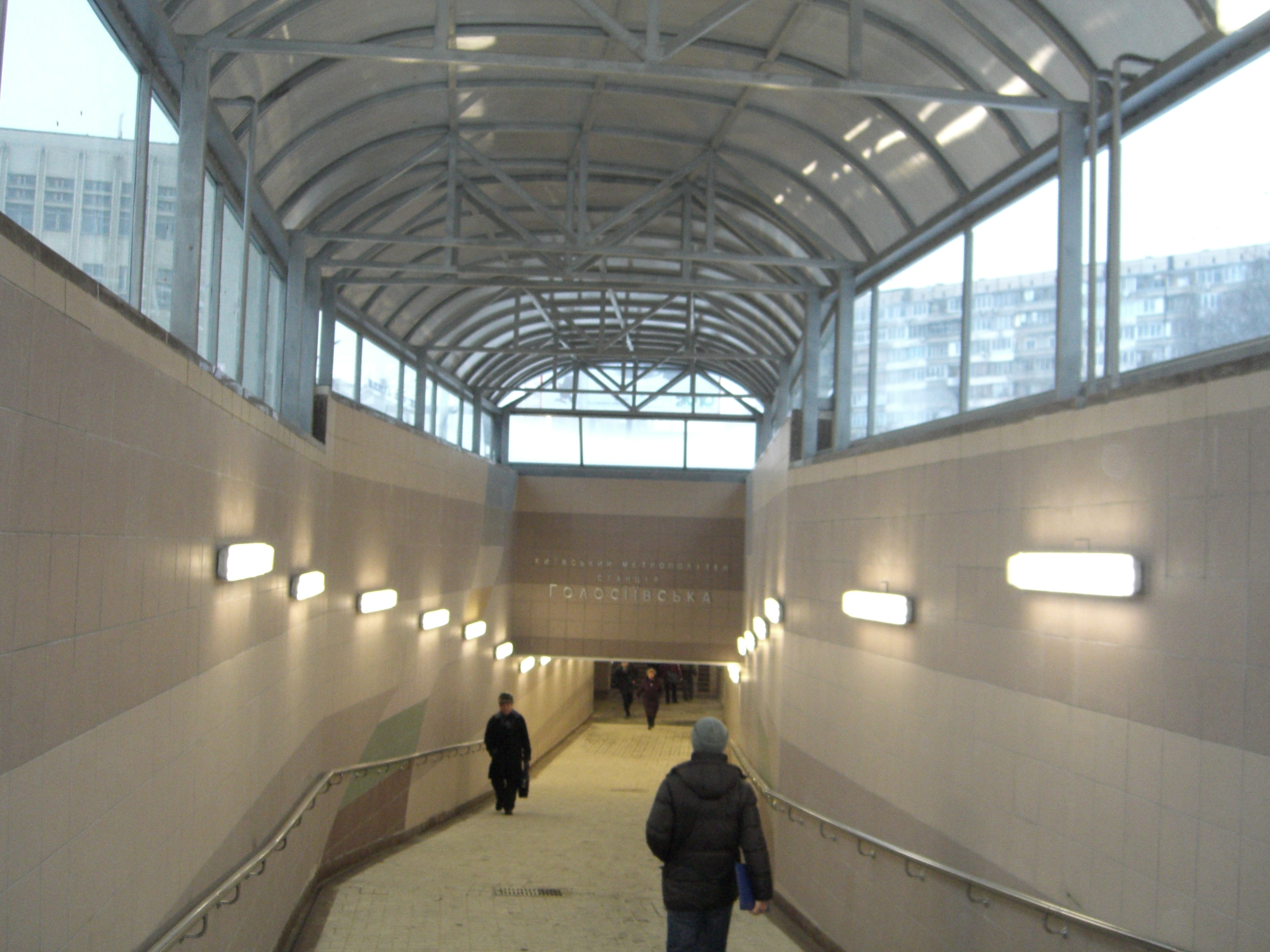
One of the additional entrances

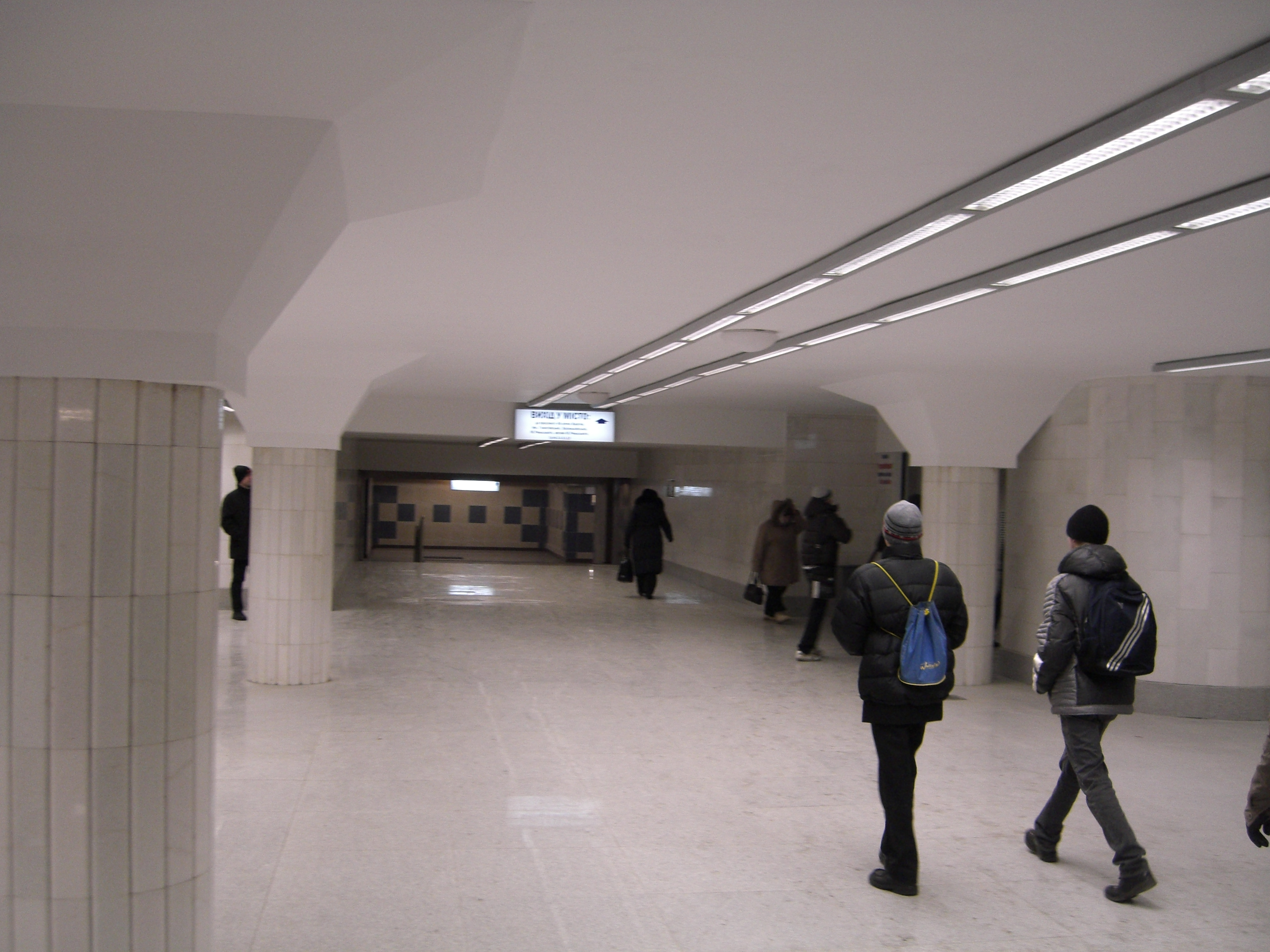
Underpass connected with the station

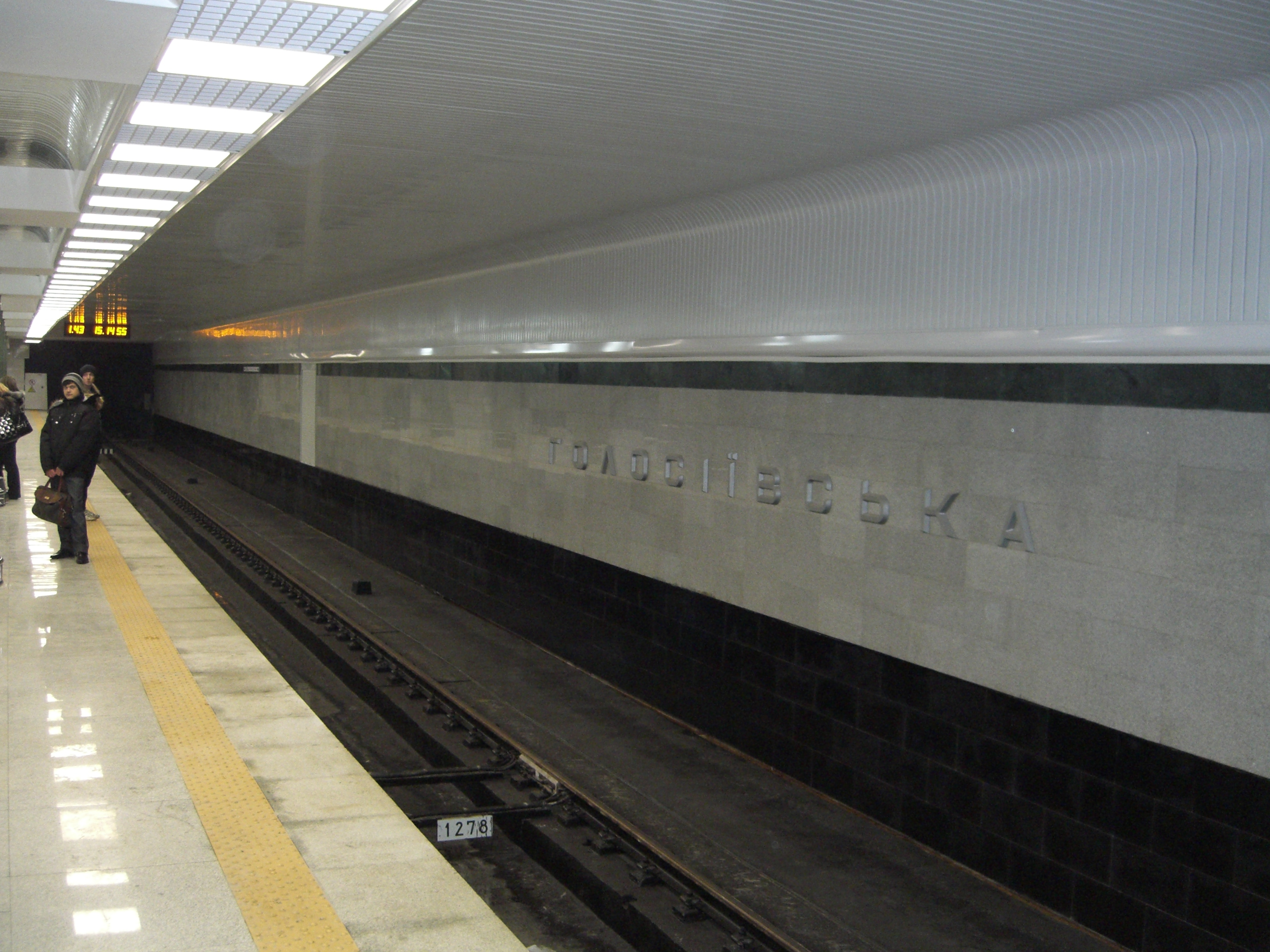
Track wall with the station name

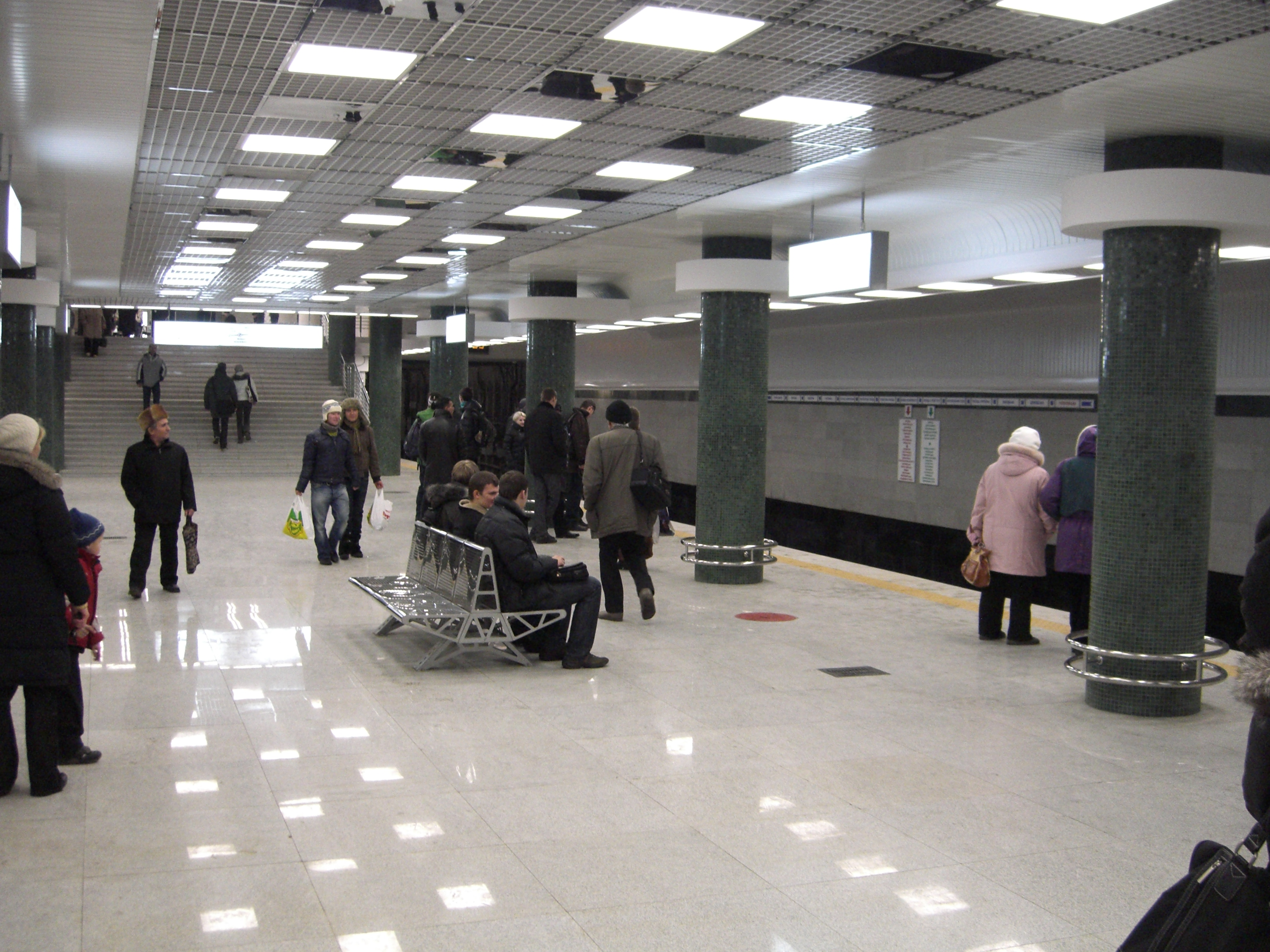
Central hall

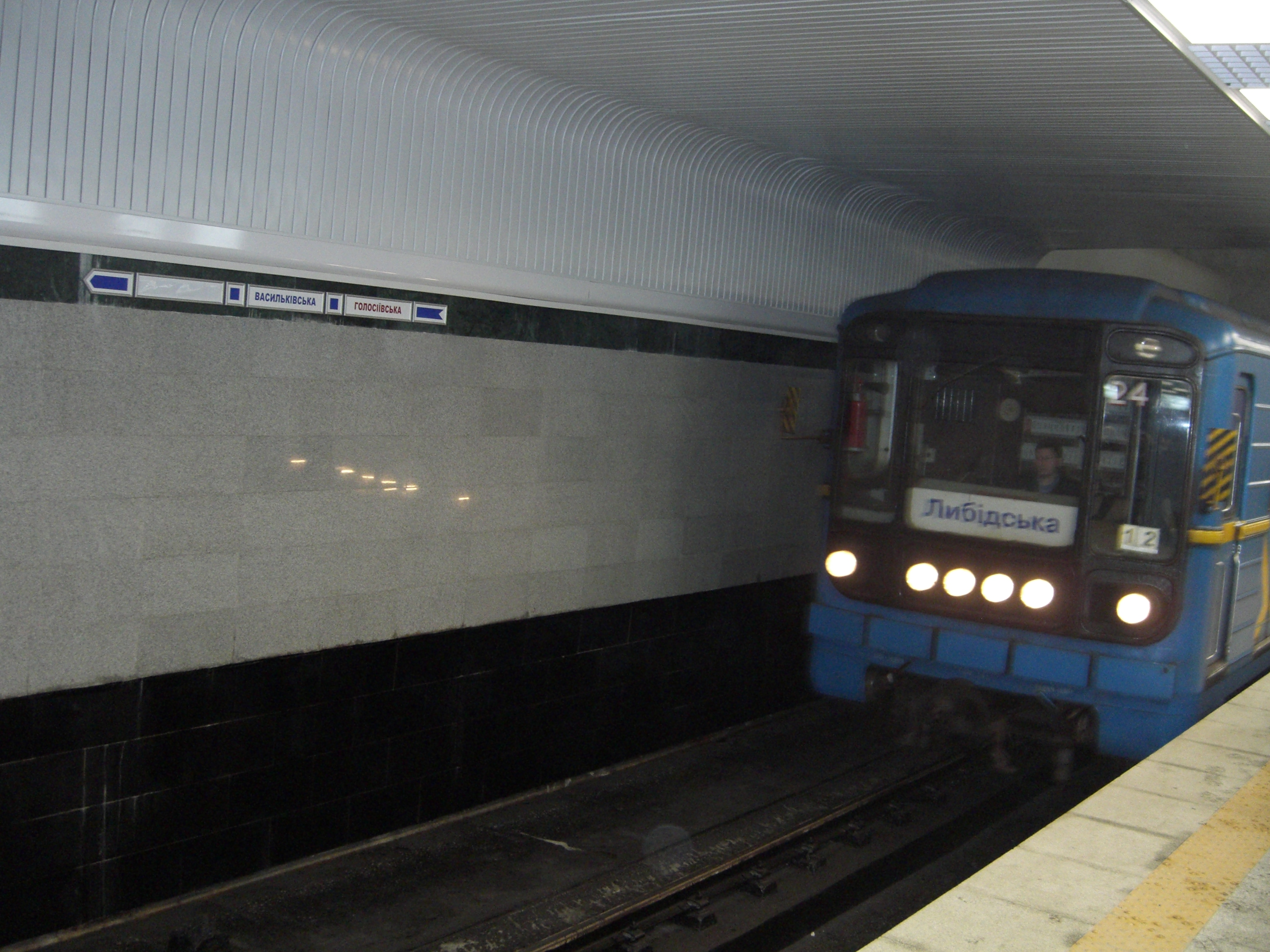
Arriving train
