= Holosiivska Square =

Square in Kyiv, Ukraine

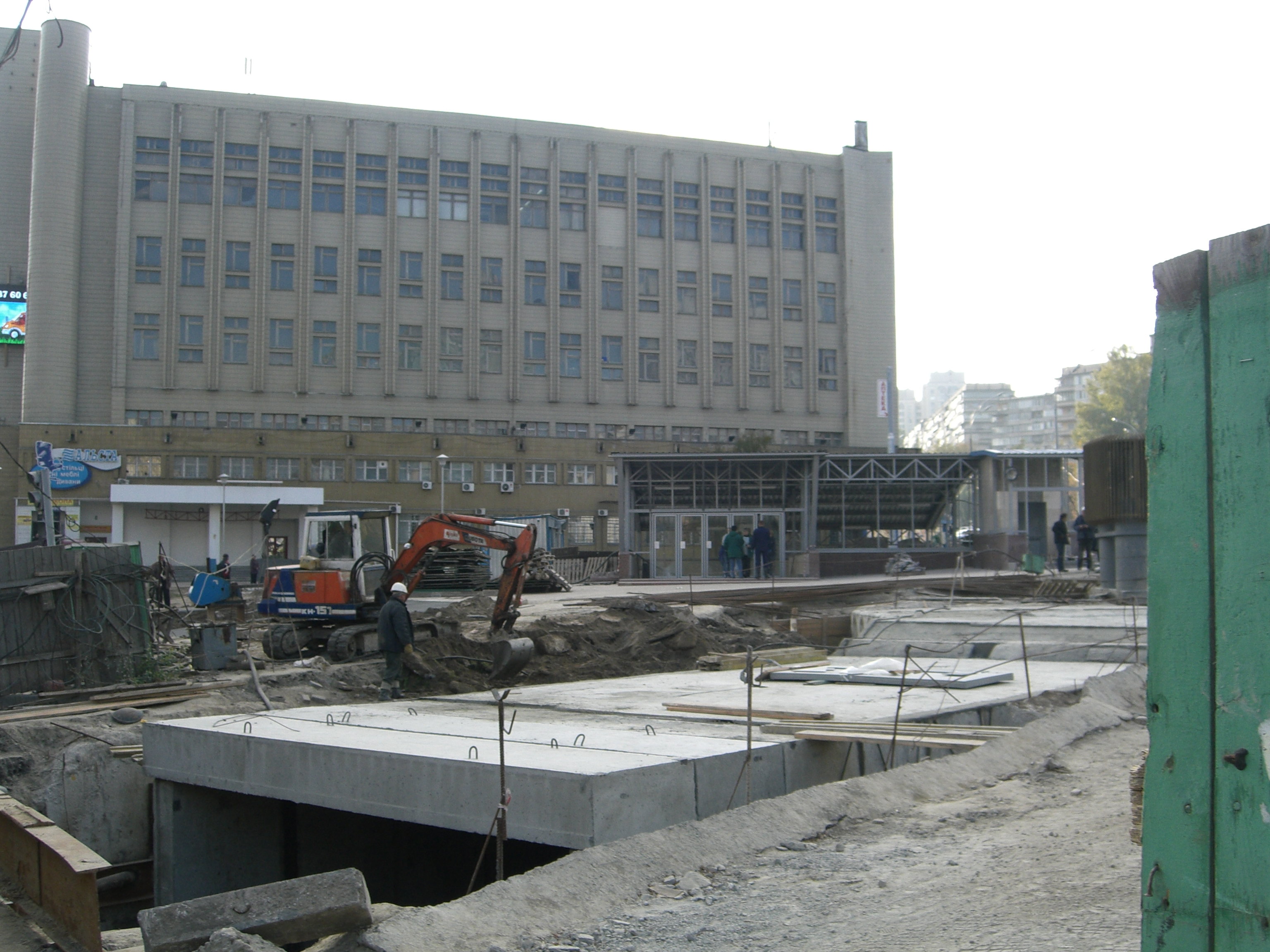
- Holosiivska Square in 2010, during the construction of the Holosiivska metro station
- Interactive map of Holosiivska Square
- Native name: Голосіївська площа (Ukrainian)
- Location: Kyiv, Ukraine
- Nearest metro station: Holosiivska
- Coordinates: 50°23′50.4″N 30°30′35.8″E

Holosiivska Square (Ukrainian: Голосіївська площа) is one of the squares of Kyiv, Ukraine.

Located in the historical area Demiivka (southern Kyiv), emerged in the 19th century and till 1961 was unnamed when it has received current name.

The square is an intersection of the streets Holosiivska, Vasylkivska and Maxima Rylskoho and avenue Holosiivskyi on the road from downtown to Odesa.

The station Holosiivska of Kyiv Metro was opened on the square in 2010.

== Sources ==
- Holosiivska Square on wek.kiev.ua (in Ukrainian)
- Голосіївська пл. // Вулиці Києва. Довідник / упоряд. А. М. Сигалов та ін. — К. : Реклама, 1975. — С. 47. (in Ukrainian)
