= Expocenter of Ukraine =

Exhibition ground in Kyiv, Ukraine

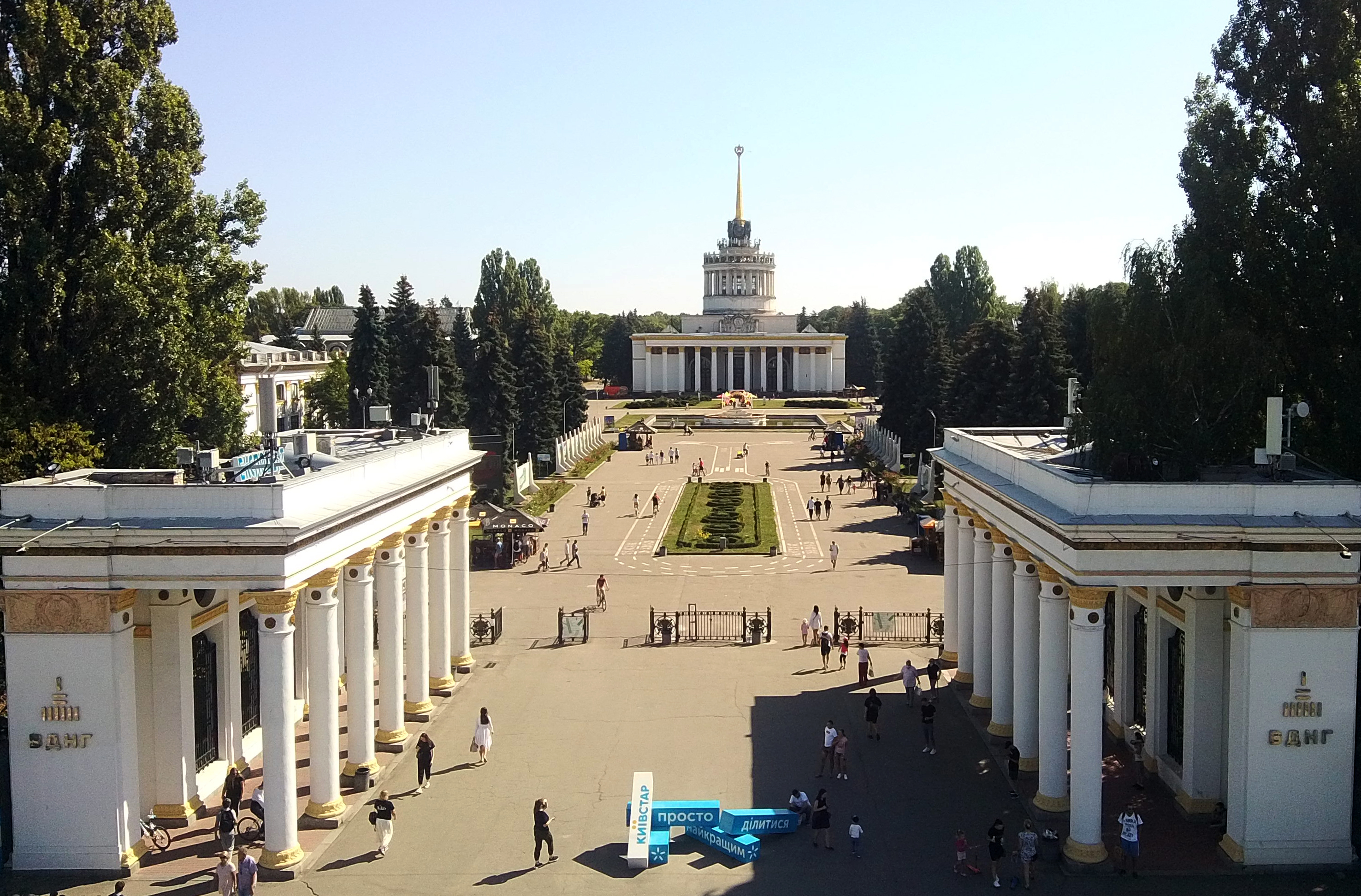
- Main entrance and main exhibition hall
- Interactive map of Expocenter of Ukraine
- Former names: VDNH of Ukrainian SSR
- Location: Kyiv, Ukraine
- Coordinates: 50.377793°N 30.479604°E
- Owner: State Office of Management Affairs
- Public transit: Vystavkovyi Tsentr

Construction
- Built: 1952–1958
- Opened: 6 July 1958
- Architect: Borys Zhezherin

Website
- vdng.ua

Immovable Monument of National Significance of Ukraine
- Official name: Комплекс Національного виставкового центру «Експоцентр України» (Complex of the National Exhibition Center "Expocenter of Ukraine")
- Type: Architecture, Urban Planning
- Reference no.: 260109

The Expocenter of Ukraine (VDNH) (Ukrainian: Експоцентр України (ВДНГ), romanized: Ekspotsentr Ukrainy (VDNH)), originally known as Exhibition of Achievements of the National Economy of Ukrainian SSR (Ukrainian: Виставка досягнень народного господарства УРСР, romanized: Vystavka dosiahnen narodnoho hospodarstva URSR) or VDNH of Ukrainian SSR (Ukrainian: ВДНГ УРСР, romanized: VDNH URSR), is a permanent multi-purpose exhibition complex in the Teremky neighborhood of Kyiv, Ukraine. Located on the outskirts of the Holosiiv Forest, a large portion of which has been converted into a park zone, the expo specializes in demonstrating Ukrainian achievements in the sphere of industry, science etc.

It is legally under the State Management of Affairs but is not financed from the state budget at all. The Expocenter of Ukraine has been functioning since 1958. The exhibition features about 100 companies.

== History ==
In 1949, the USSR Council of Ministers signed the statute for the construction of facilities for a Republic Agricultural Exhibition in Kyiv. It was built on the site of a small suburban village called Krasny traktir (English: Red Tavern). Construction began in 1952 and lasted six years.

The center was designed by architects Borys Zhezherin, Vitaly Orekhov, I. Mezentsev, Anatoly Stanislavsky, D. Batalov, engineer S. Malkin in the form of a complex of pavilions, towers, outdoor areas for exhibits, cultural buildings and recreation areas.

On the eve of the opening, it was renamed the Exhibition of Advanced Achievements of the National Economy of the USSR. During its existence, its name has been changed many times.

The official opening of the exhibition took place on July 6, 1958. Nikolai Podgorny, the first secretary of the Central Committee of the Communist Party of Ukraine, personally cut the red ribbon.

During the existence of the exhibition, it has been visited by world-famous people: Charles De Gaulle, Josip Broz Tito, Margaret Thatcher and others.

After Ukraine gained independence, it was renamed the National Complex "Expocenter of Ukraine".

On June 18, 2015, the expo center was headed by a new team of managers, led by Maksym Bakhmatov, who planned to turn it into a modern innovation and cultural center.

On March 21, 2017, Yevhen Mushkin was appointed General Director.

Kyiv City Council and public organizations proposed to create several important objects there. On July 6, 2018 the exhibition center celebrated its 60th anniversary of the opening. The staff of the expo center was greeted by the head of the State Management of Affairs Ivan Kutsyk.

== Infrastructure ==
The Expocenter complex includes 180 buildings and structures. 20 buildings have the status of architectural and urban monuments of local significance of Ukraine – the entrance propylaea, the main pavilion and numerous other pavilions, the buildings of restaurants "Spring" and "Summer", greenhouse, two kiosks, four fountains and a water tower.

The total area of the National Complex of the Expocenter of Ukraine is 286.3 hectares and it ranks the Expocenter fifth in the world among the largest exhibition centers on the planet after Moscow, Hanover, Milan and Frankfurt. It is the greenest expo center in the world in terms of forest park area.

About 100 exhibition events are held annually at the exhibition areas of the Expocenter of Ukraine, half of which are international and national specialized exhibitions, the rest – exhibition and presentation, business, corporate, sports, holiday events. Exhibitors from 25 countries take part in the exhibitions of the Expocenter every year.

== Development concept ==
On July 20, 2017, there was held a public presentation of the concept of development of the Expocenter for the next 40 years, and the wife of the former President of Ukraine Maryna Poroshenko attended it.

On September 18, 2017, the responsible state commission summed up the results of the competition for the best NCEU development project. Kyivexpoplaza LLC was the winner of the competition.

== Image ==
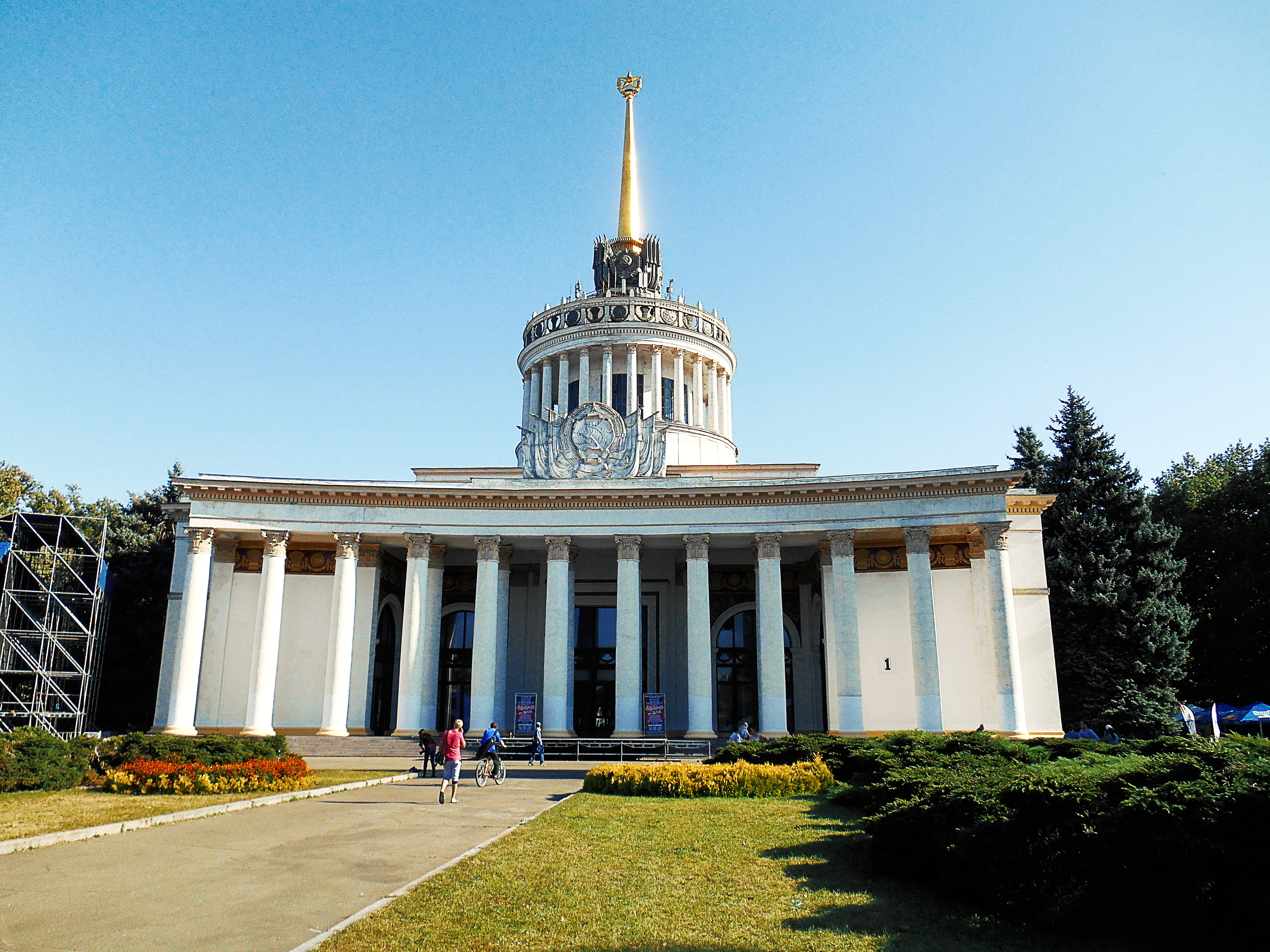

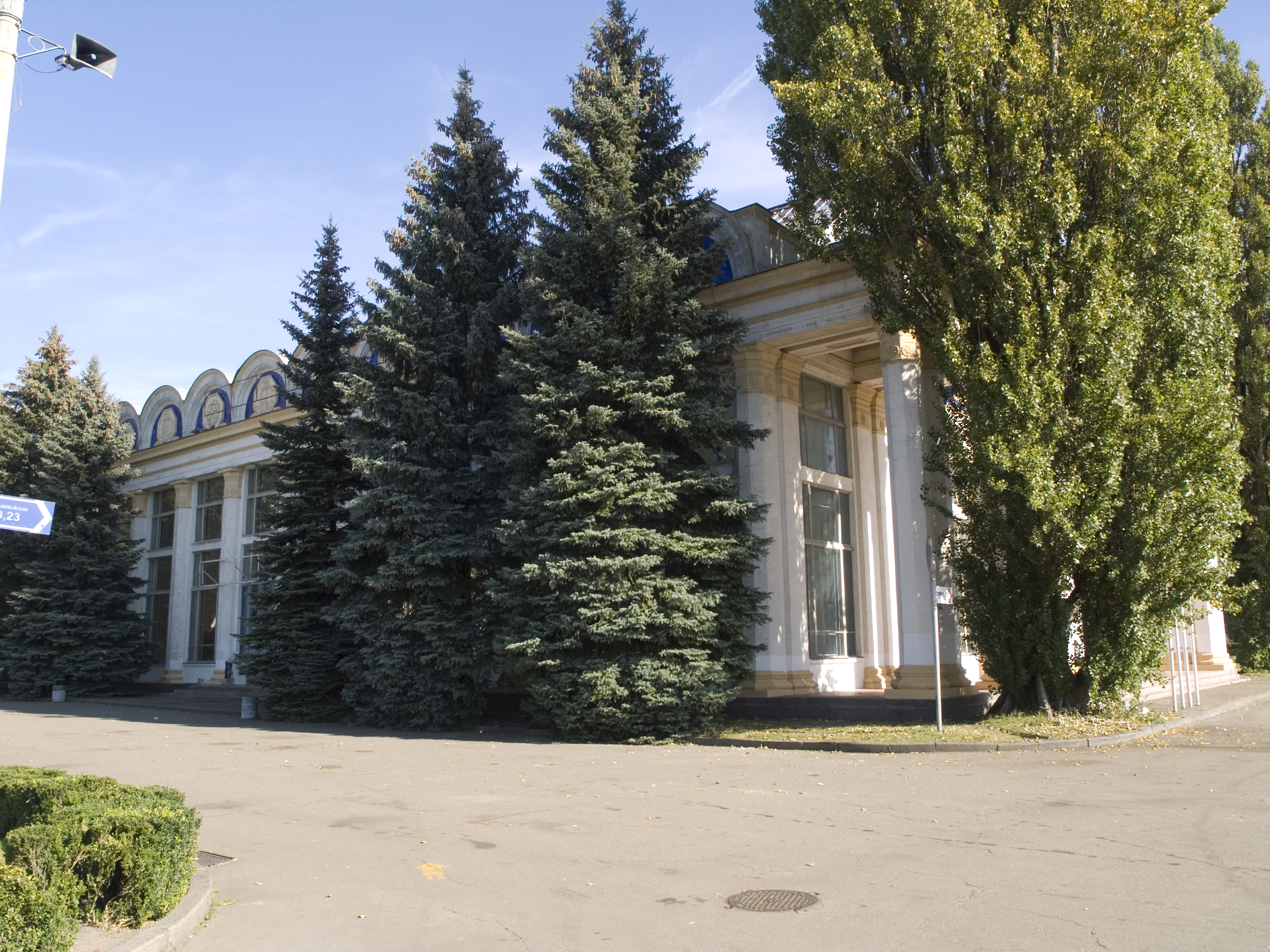

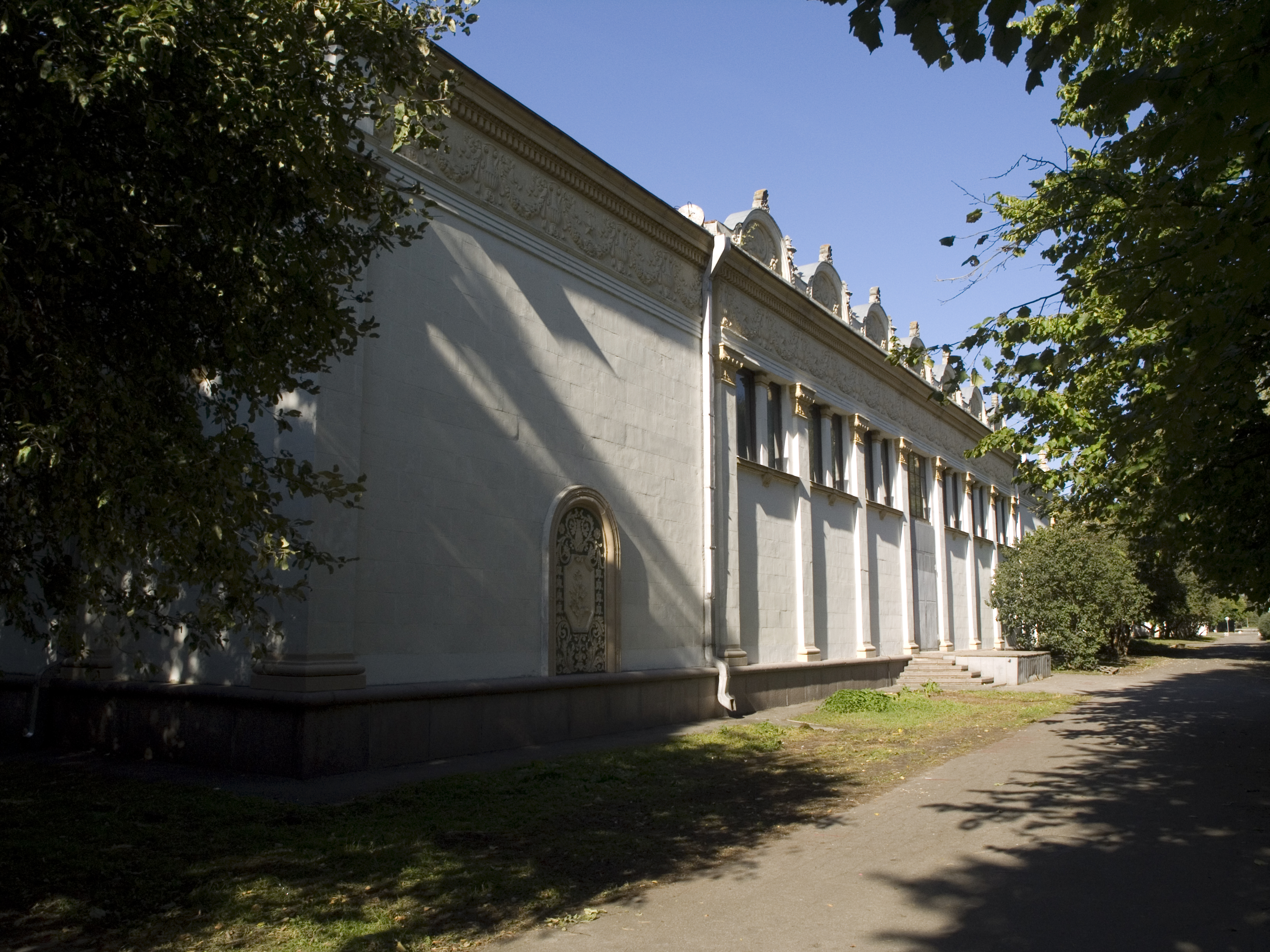

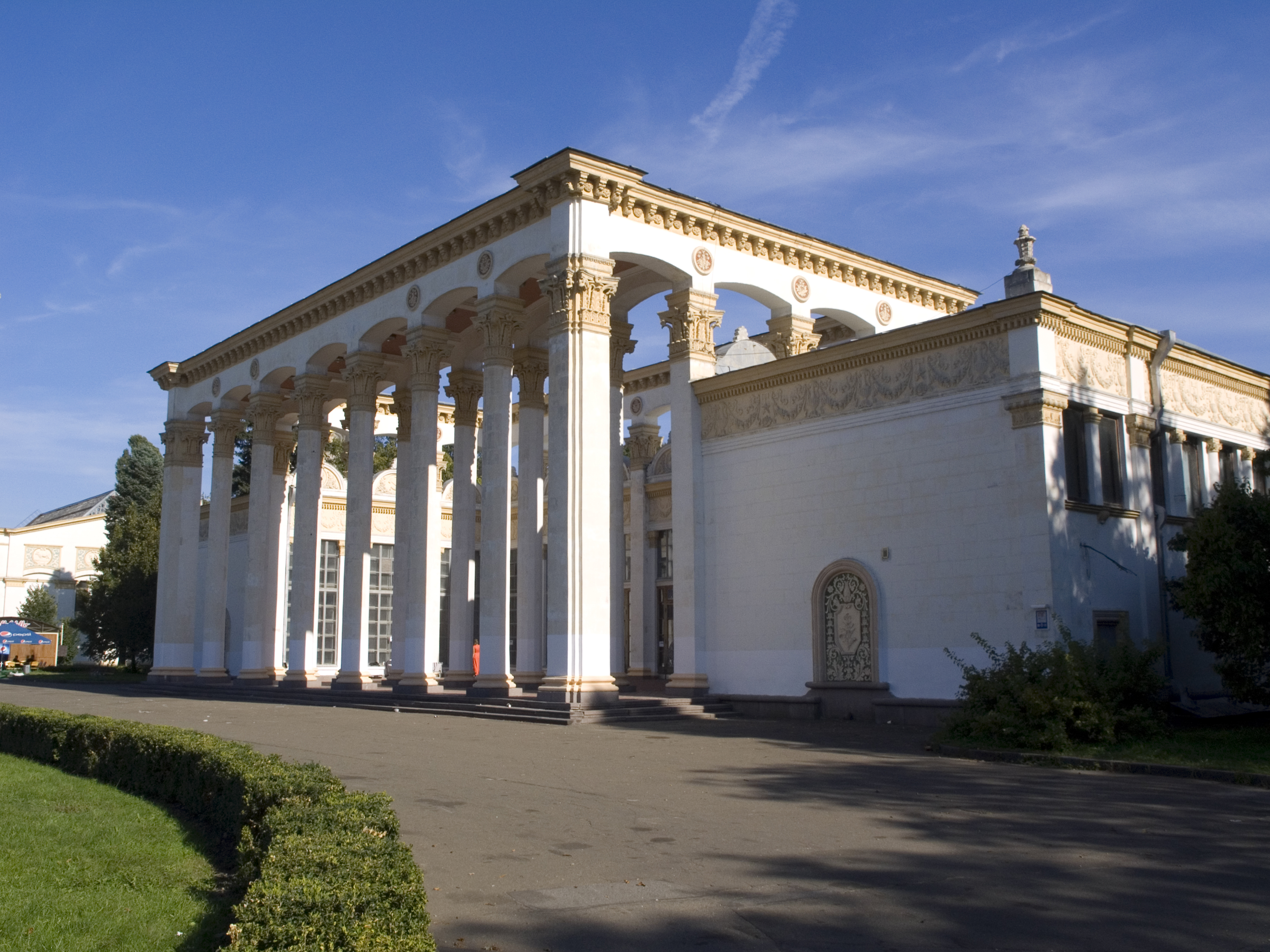

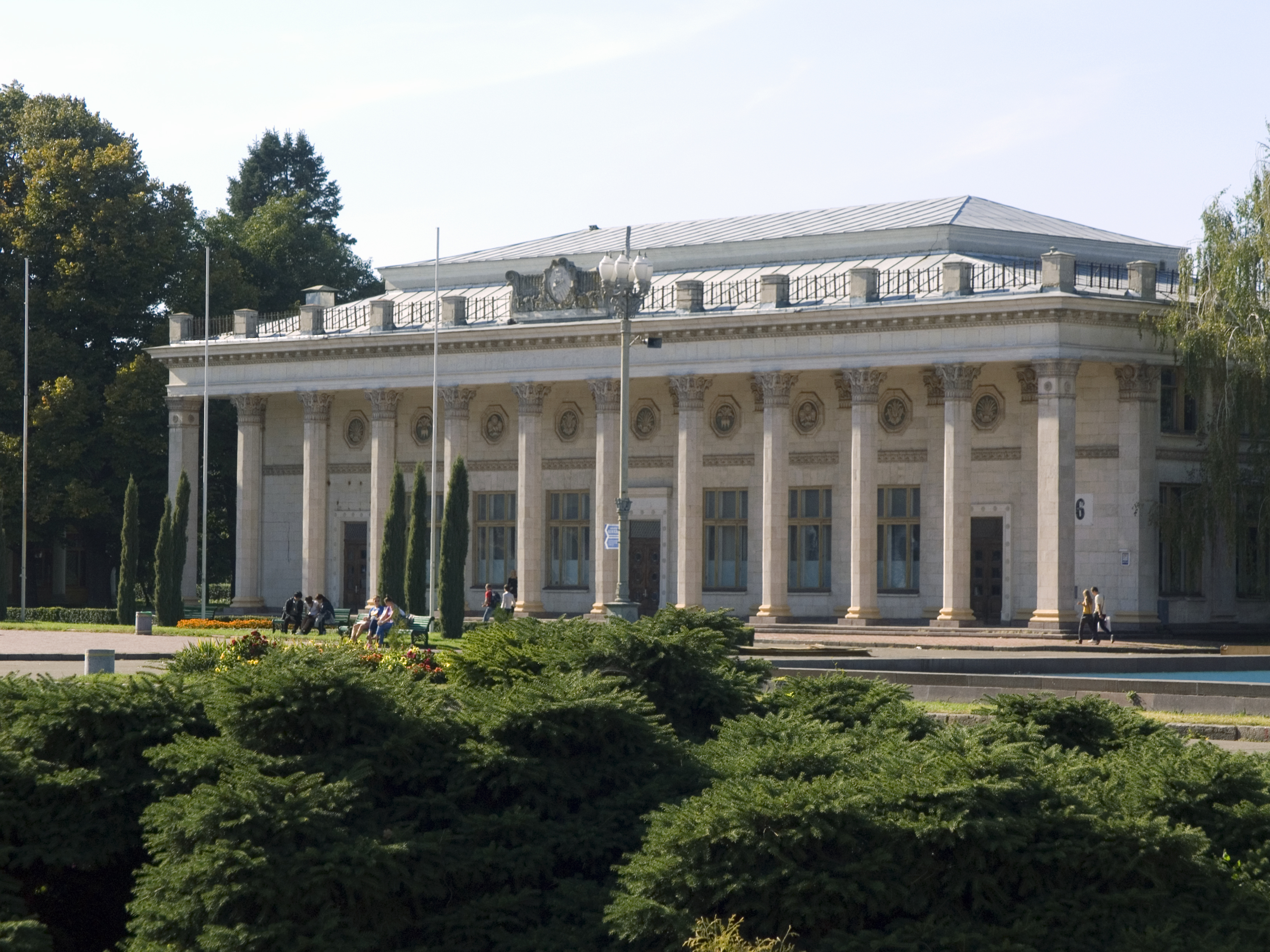

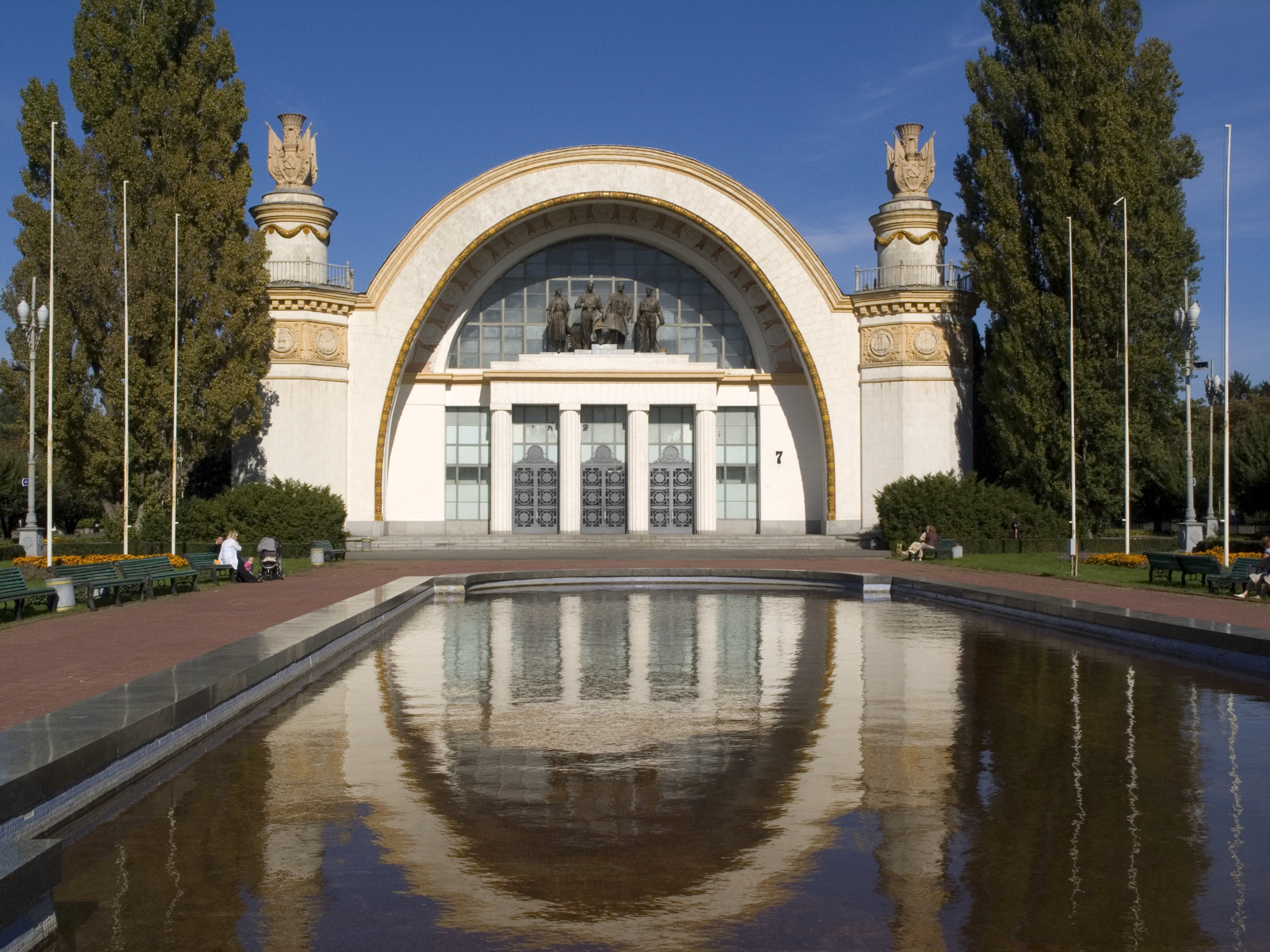

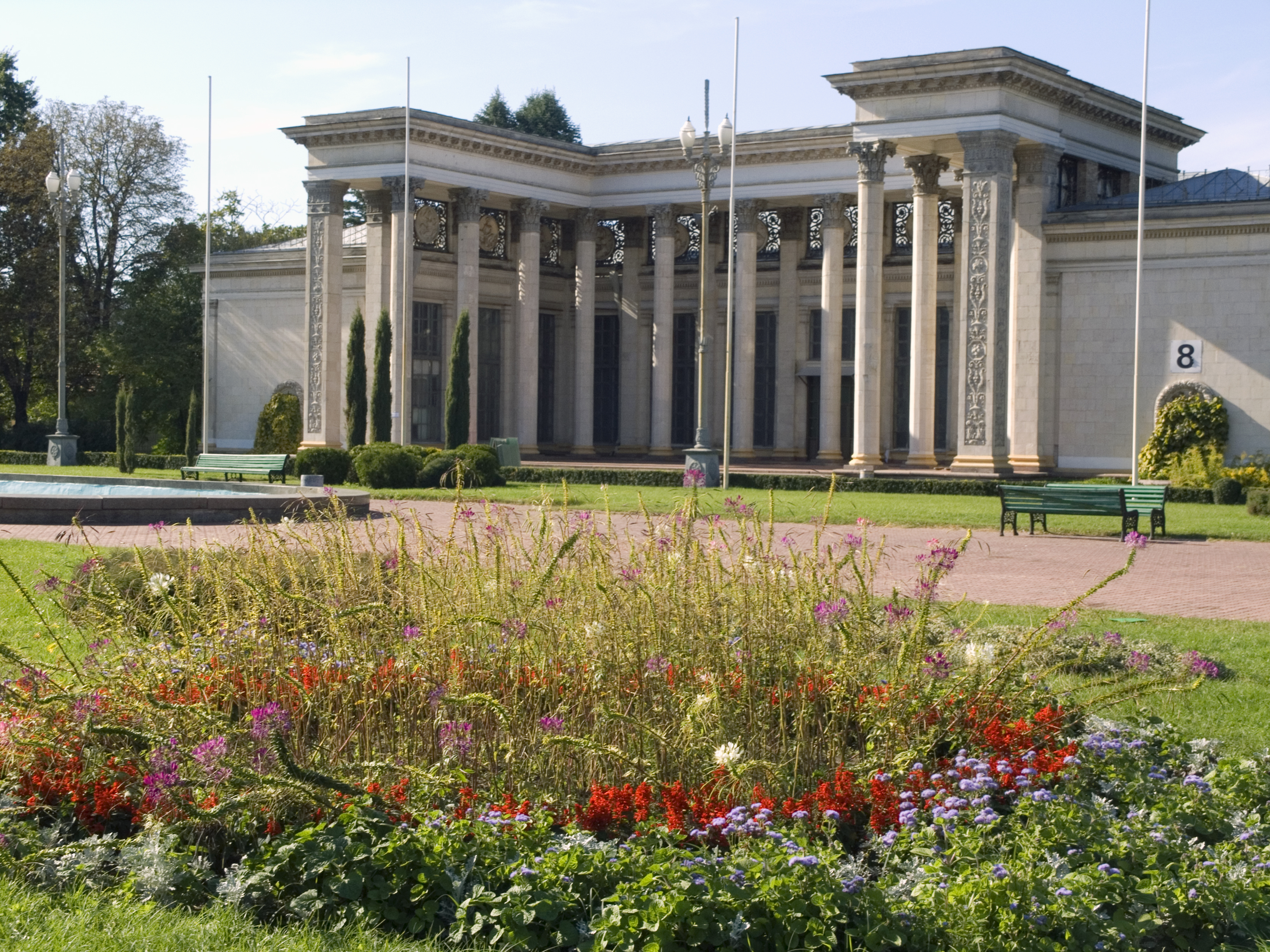

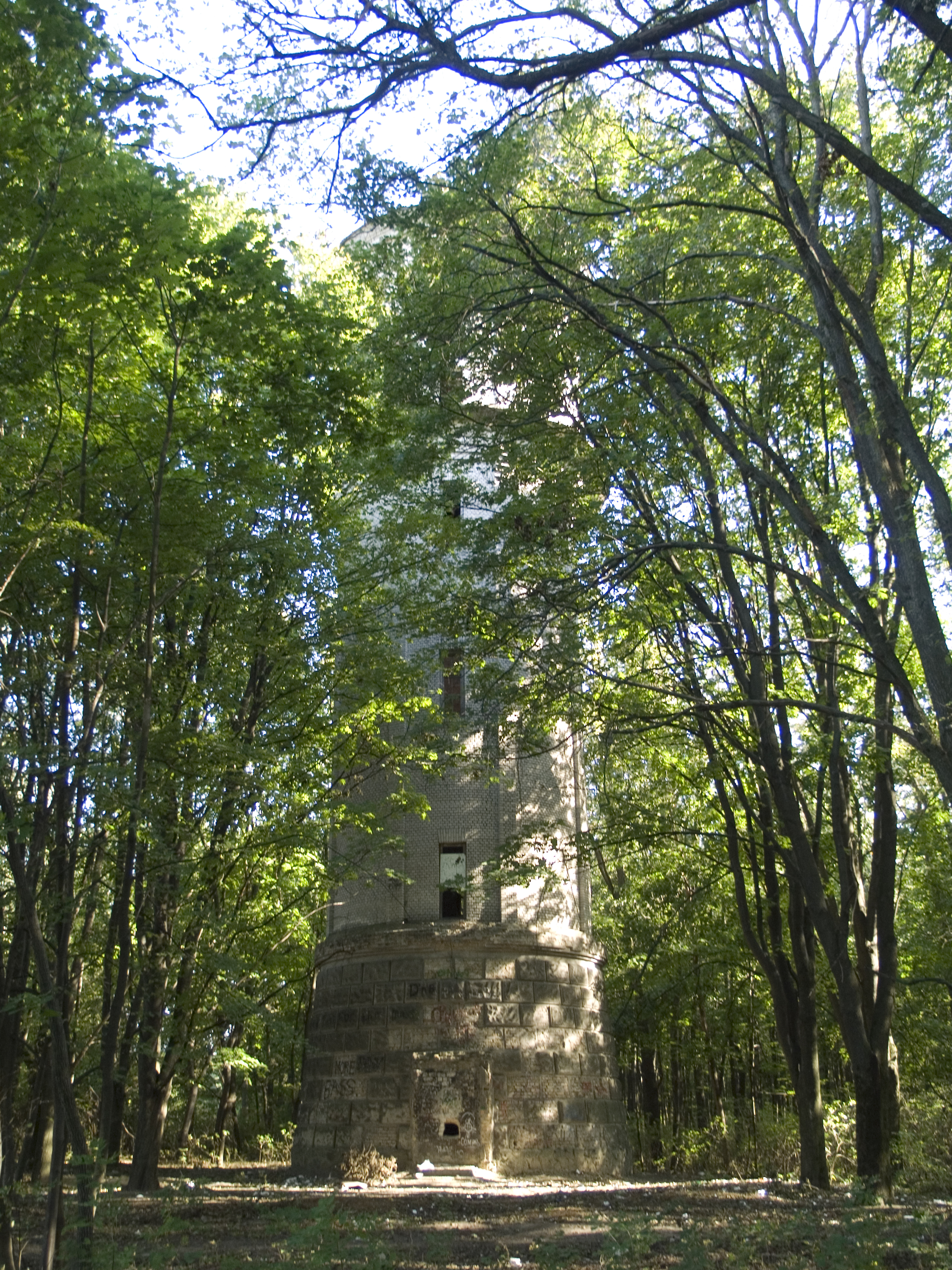

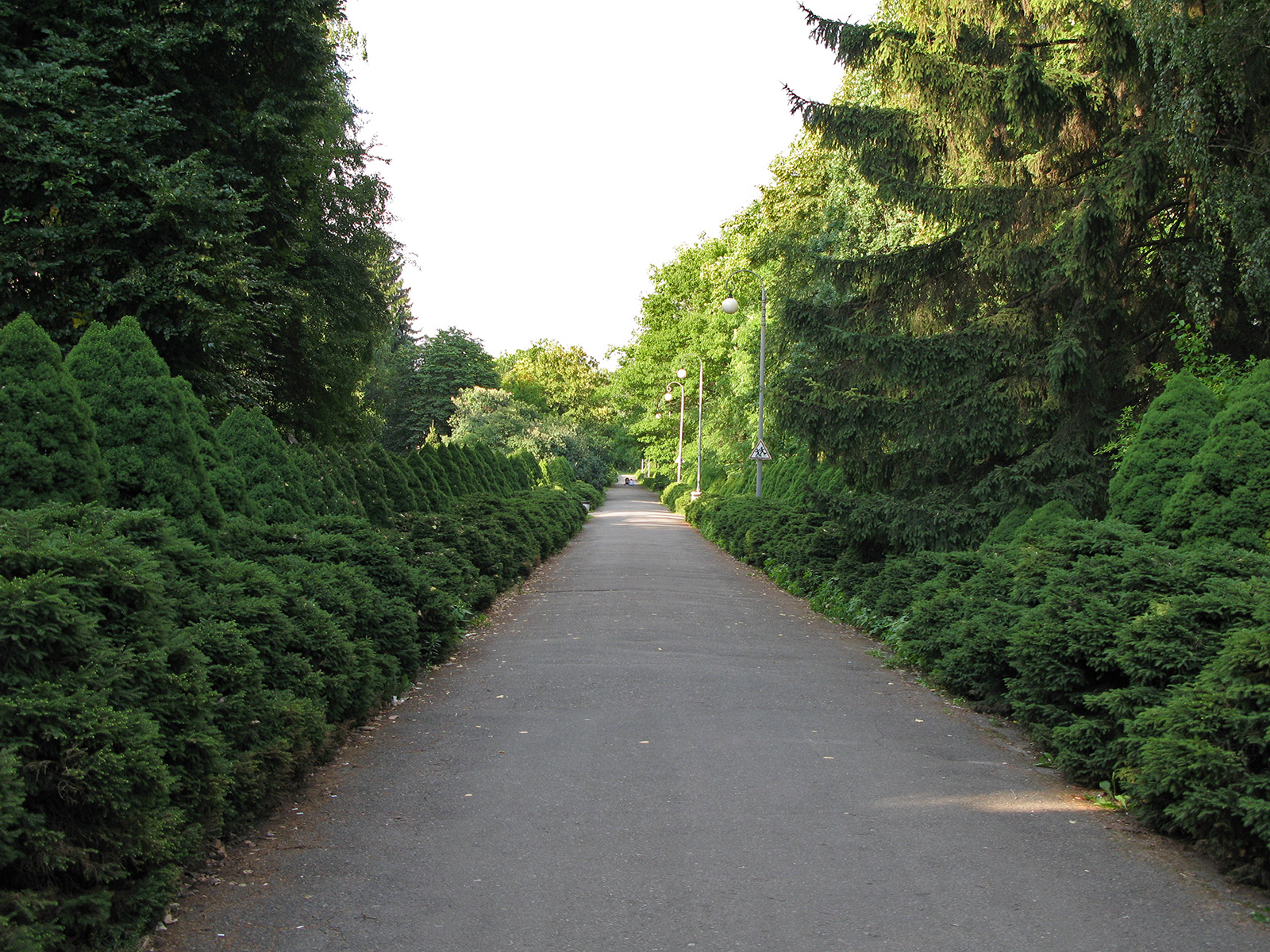

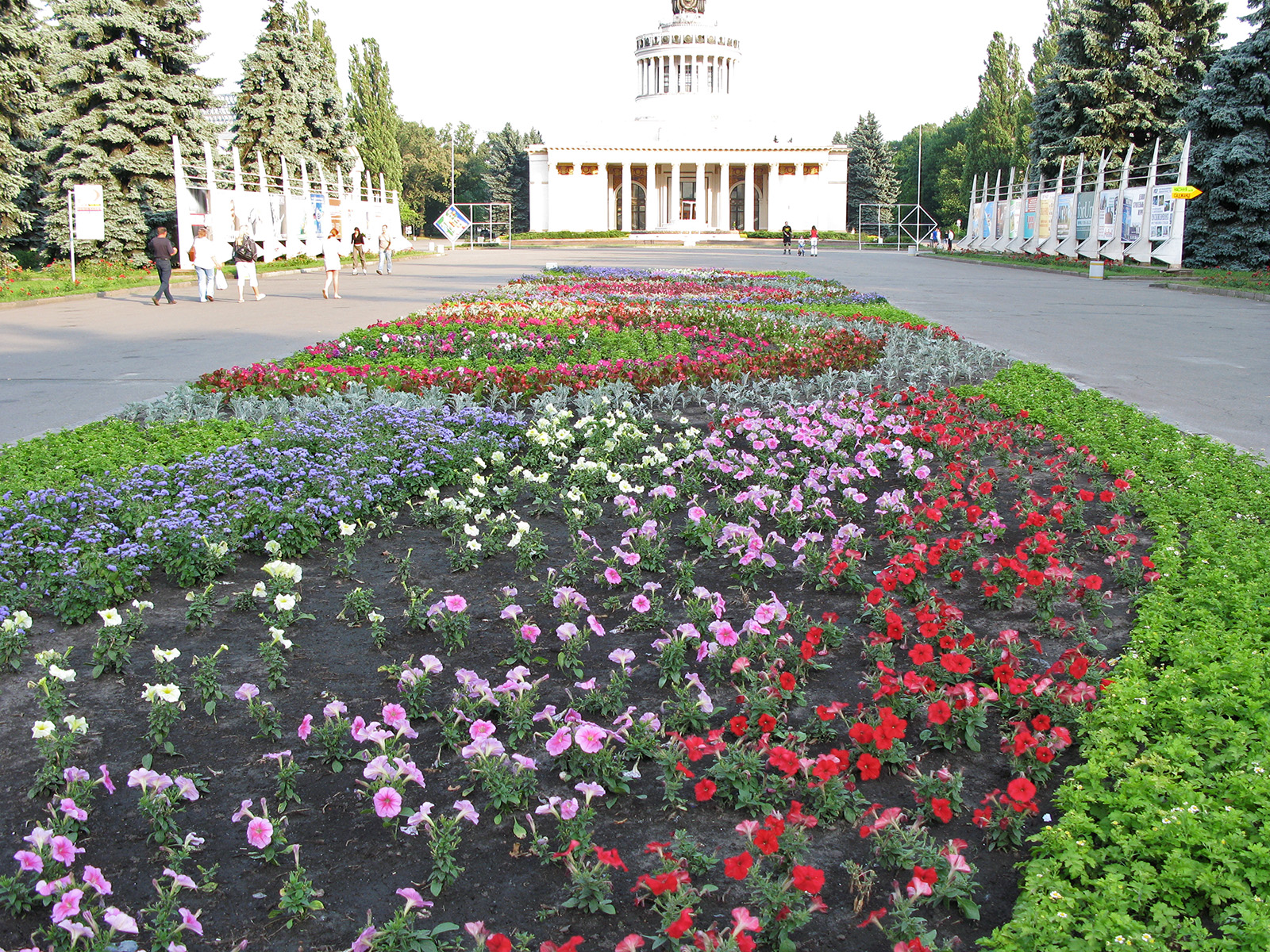

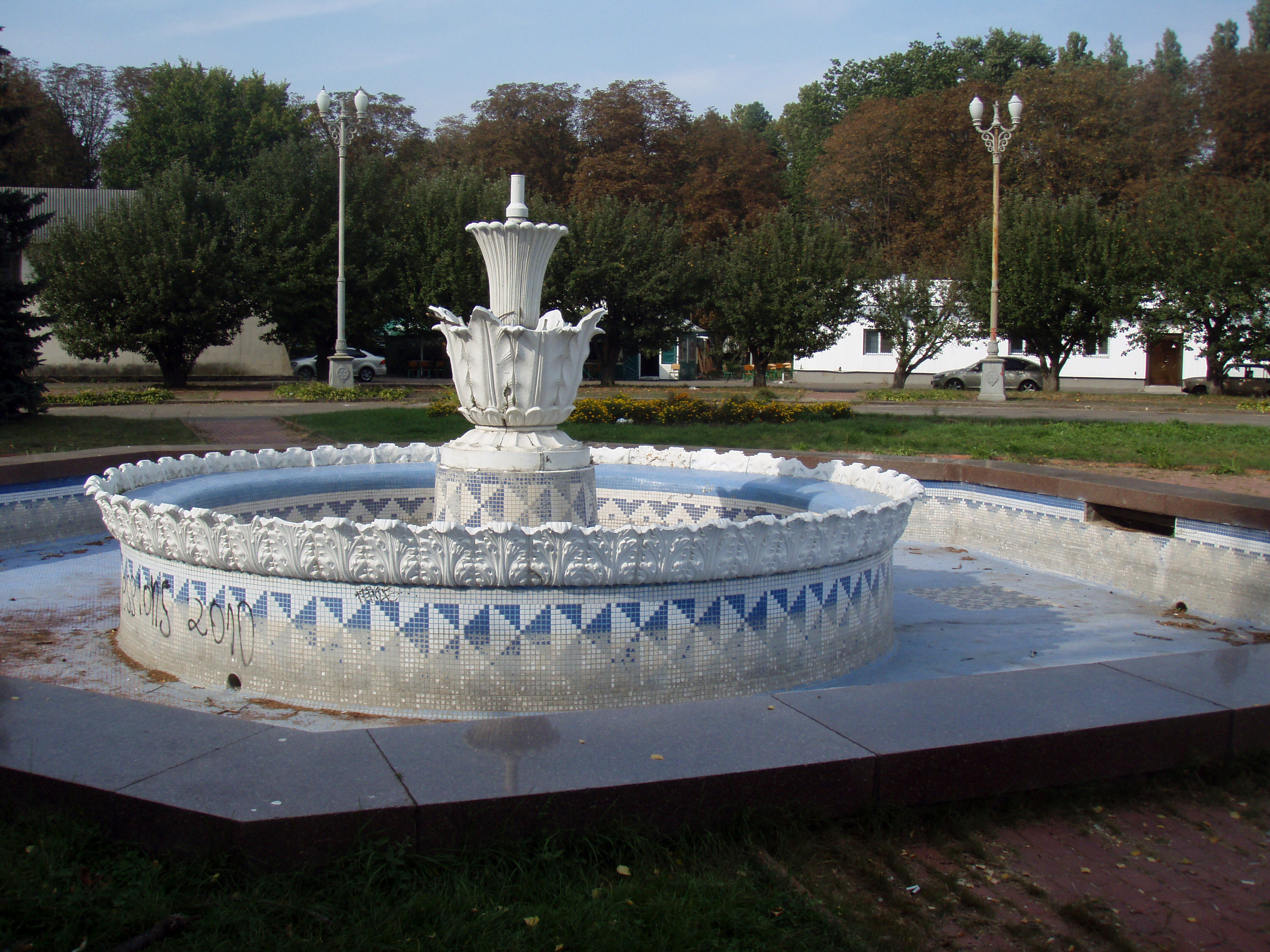
