= Teremky =

- Neighborhood of Kyiv
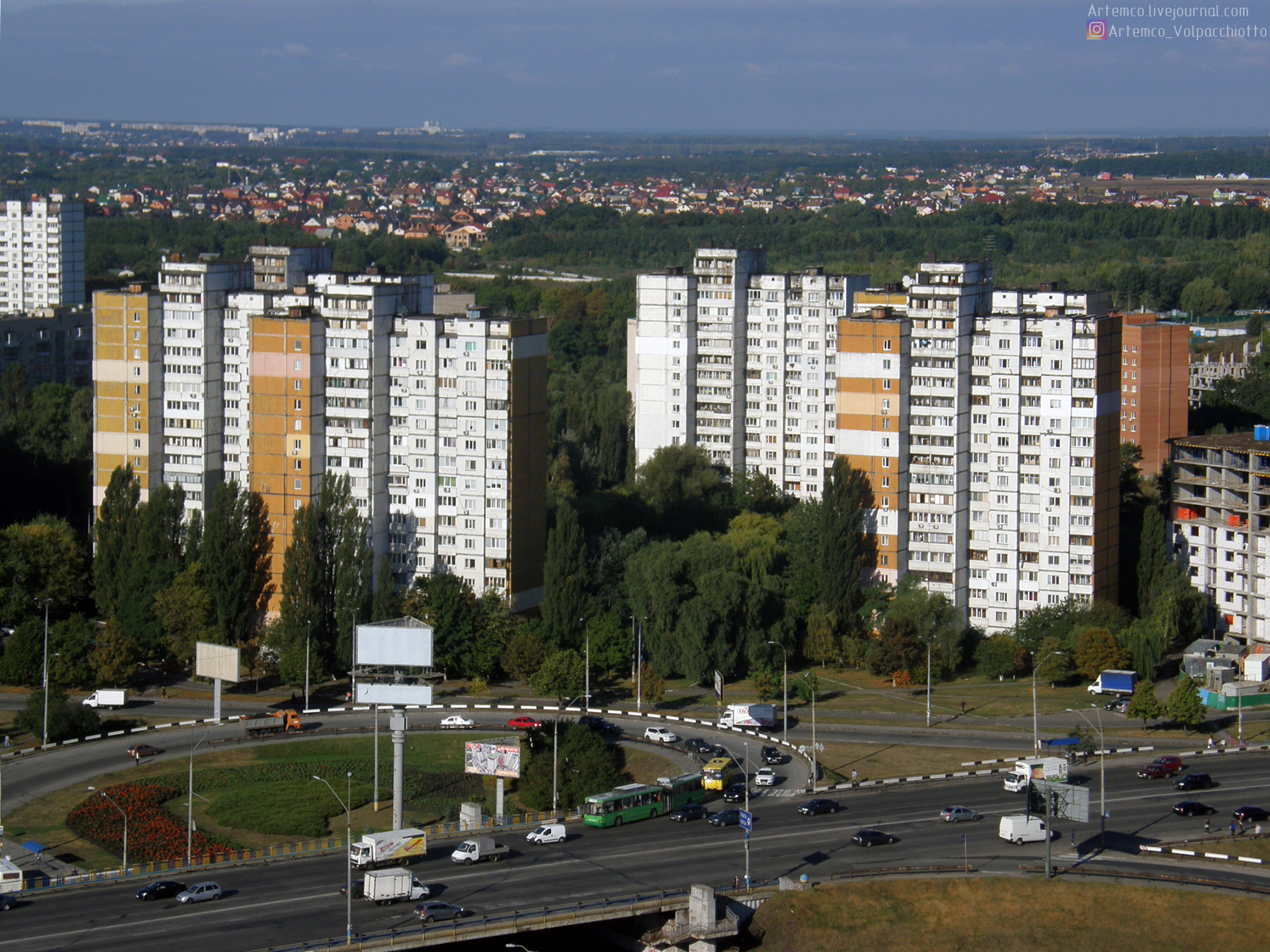
- Interactive map of Teremky
- Coordinates: 50°22′01″N 30°27′15″E
- Country: Ukraine
- City: Kyiv
- District: Holosiivskyi District

Teremky (Ukrainian: Теремки pronounced [teremˈkɪ]) is a neighborhood located in the Holosiivskyi district of Kyiv, the capital of Ukraine. It is located in the southern part of the city, in between the city's Holosiiv, Feofaniia, and Zhuliany neighborhoods.

The National Expocenter of Ukraine and Kyiv's Ipodrom horse racetrack are located in the neighborhood. Teremky is served by a metro station of the Kyiv Metro's Obolonsko–Teremkivska line.

== History ==
Development of Teremky district began in the early 1970s with the relocation in this area of the V.M.Glushkov Institute of Cybernetics of the NAS of Ukraine which was transferred from its previous address, Prospekt Nauki. The first residents of the massif were employees of the Institute - academicians, doctors and candidates of science, scientists, representatives of the scientific community.

Teremky I border on with the deciduous forest, which is a part of the Holosiiv National Nature Park (since 2007), a zone of sustainable recreation.
