= Heroiv Dnipra (Kyiv Metro) =

Kyiv Metro Station

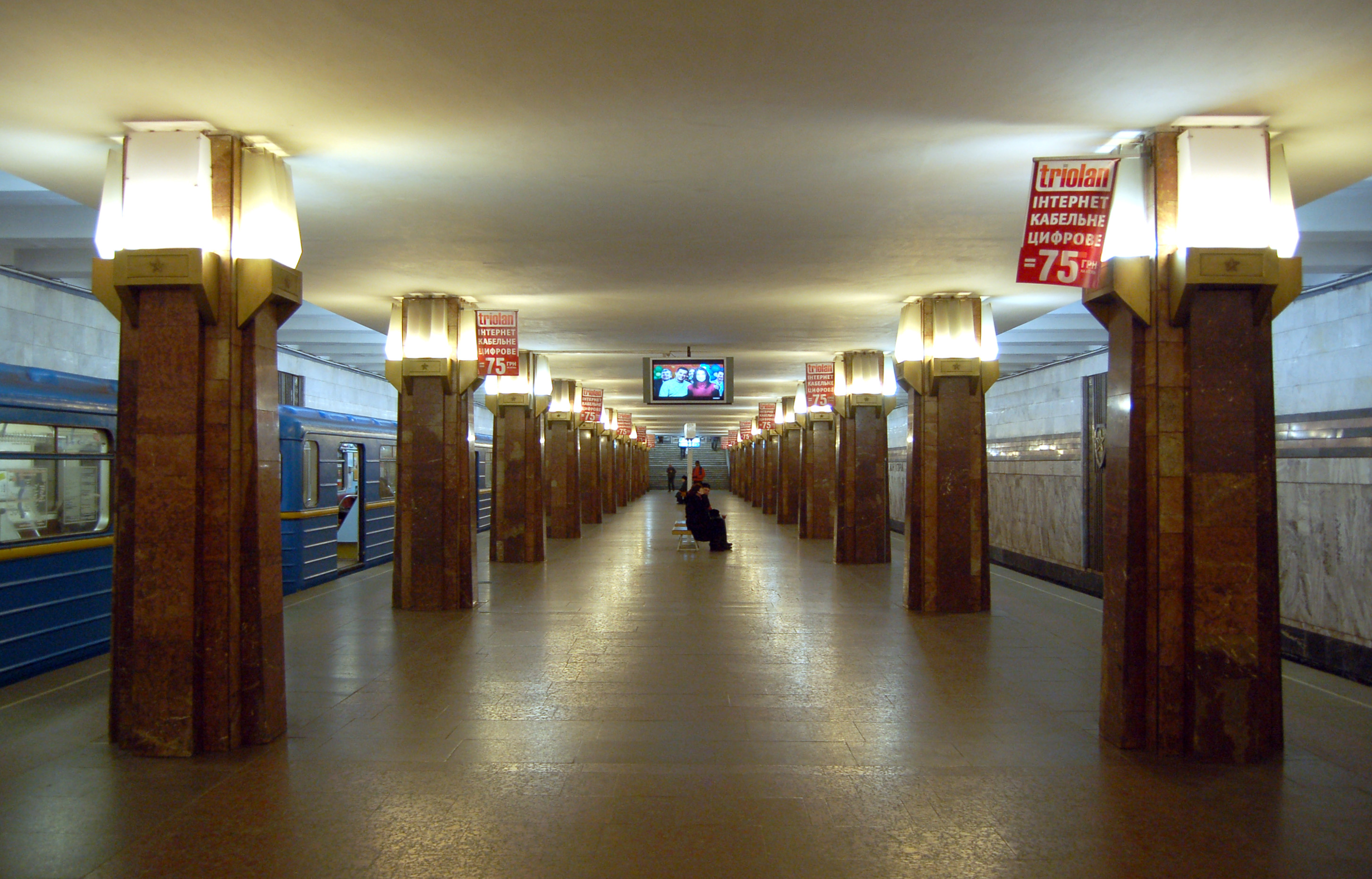
- The Station Hall

General information
- Location: Obolonskyi District; Kyiv; Ukraine
- Coordinates: 50°31′22″N 30°29′55″E
- System: Kyiv Metro station
- Owner: Kyiv Metro
- Line: Obolonsko–Teremkivska line
- Platforms: 1
- Tracks: 2

Construction
- Structure type: underground
- Platform levels: 1

Other information
- Station code: 210

History
- Opened: 6 November 1982

Services
| Preceding station | Kyiv Metro | Following station |
|---|---|---|
| Terminus | Obolonsko–Teremkivska line | Minska towards Teremky |
Location

Heroiv Dnipra (Ukrainian: Героїв Дніпра, lit. 'Heroes of the Dnieper') is a station on Kyiv Metro's Obolonsko–Teremkivska line, in Kyiv, Ukraine. The station was opened on 6 November 1982 in the Obolonskyi Raion of Kyiv and was designed by G.D. Andreev. The underground Metro station is named after the street directly above it.

The station is closer to the surface than a lot of other Metro stations. The platform has a central hall with brown square columns. The walls are adorned with white and yellow marble, and the floor is red granite. There were socialist red stars (who became illegal due to 2015 decommunization laws) at the top of the columns, which is also where the station's lighting comes from. The station is accessible by two passenger tunnels; one leading to Obolonskyi Prospect and the other to Heroiv Dnipra Street (from which it takes its name).

Voters chose to rename the station Heroiv Ukrainy (Ukrainian: Героїв України; Heroes of Ukraine) in a poll taken during the Russian invasion of Ukraine. Another choice was Heroiv Mariupolia. In May 2023 the Kyiv City Council renamed three Kyiv Metro stations, Heroiv Dnipra was not renamed. The last Communist and Soviet Army symbols in the station were removed on 7 January 2024.

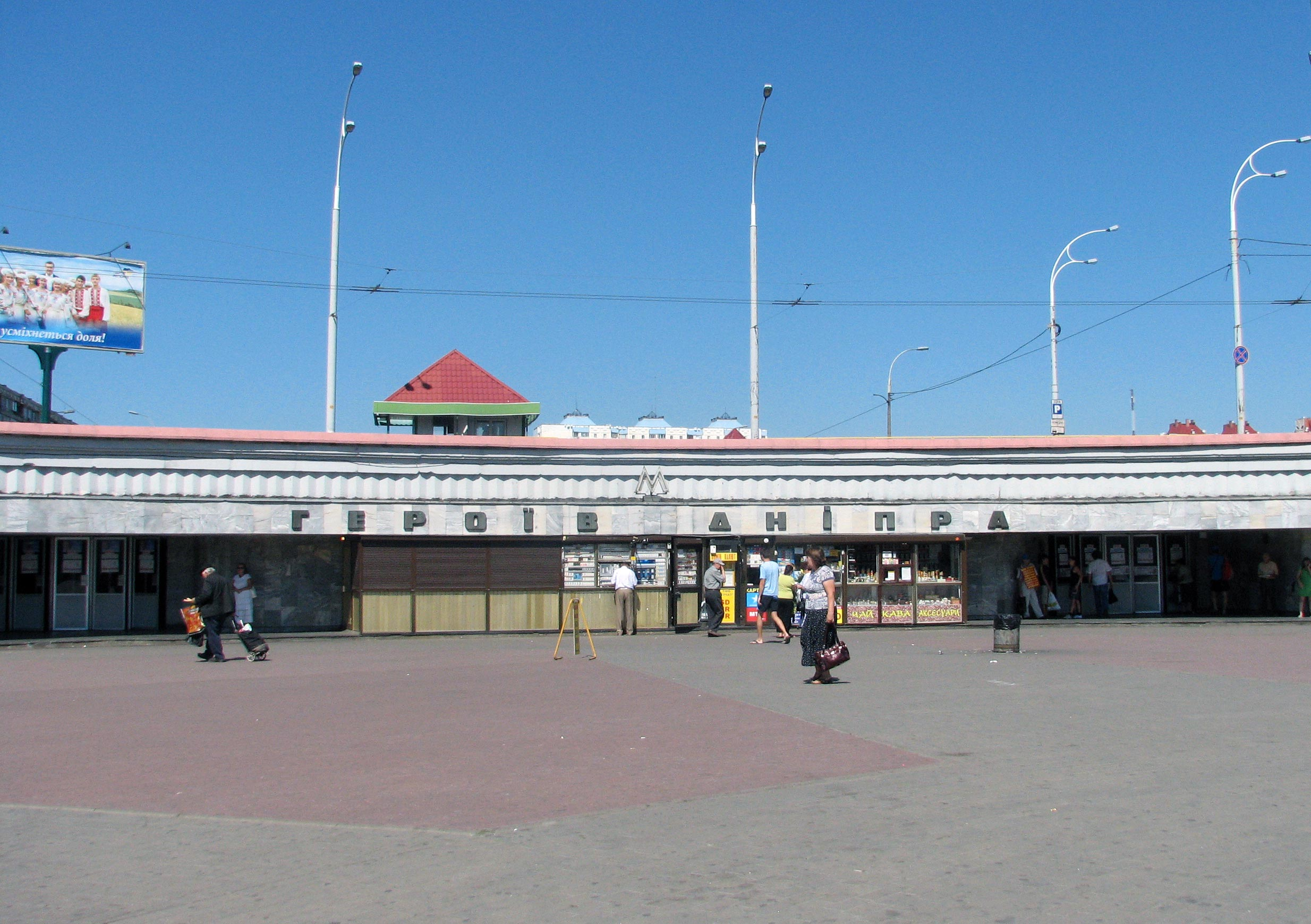
Entrance to Heroiv Dnipra Metro Station
