= Teremky (Kyiv Metro) =

Kyiv Metro Station

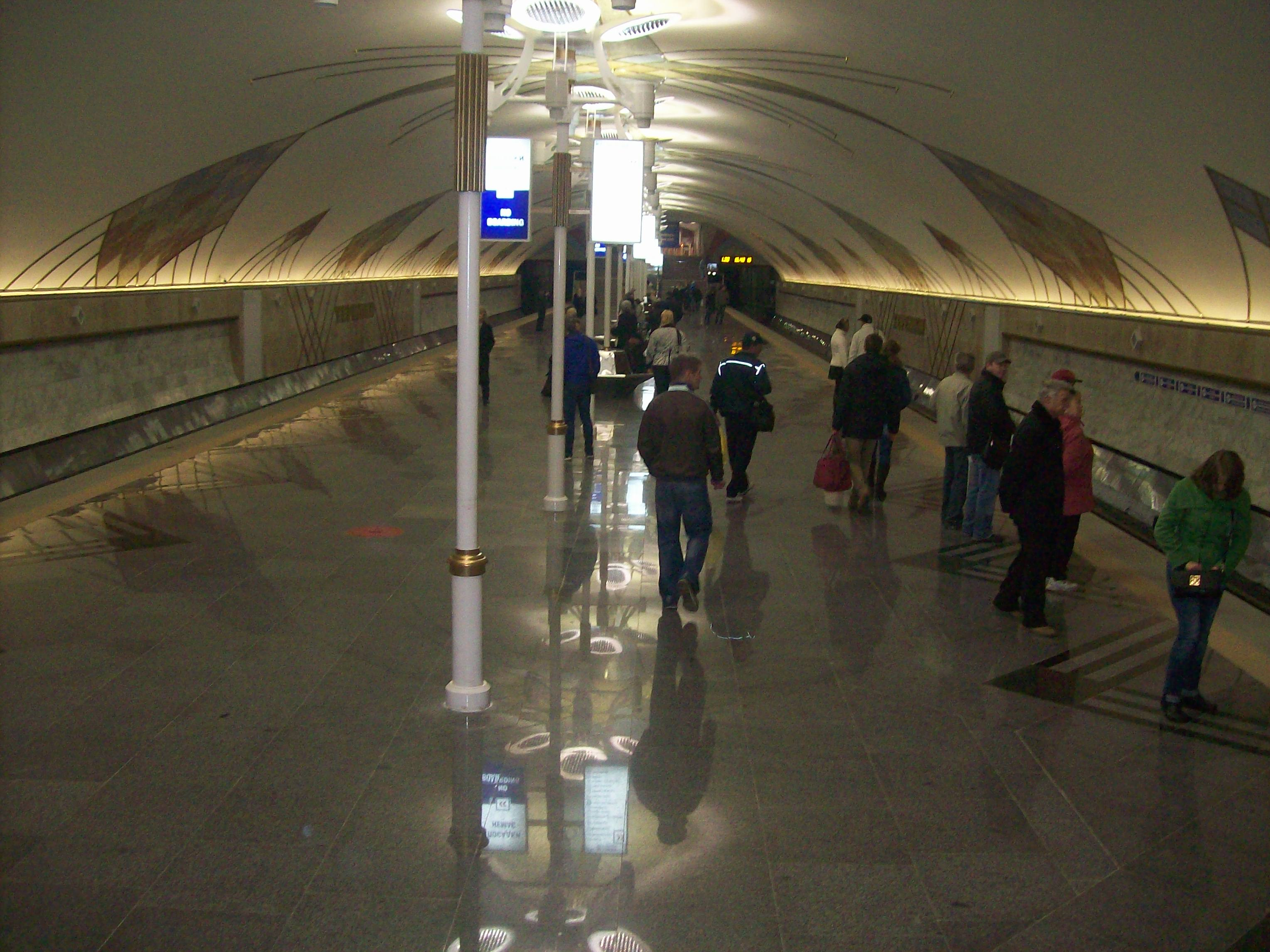

General information
- Location: Holosiivskyi District; Kyiv; Ukraine
- Coordinates: 50°22′1.36″N 30°27′15.13″E
- System: Kyiv Metro station
- Owner: Kyiv Metro
- Line: Obolonsko–Teremkivska line
- Platforms: 1
- Tracks: 2

Construction
- Structure type: underground
- Platform levels: 1

Other information
- Station code: 227

History
- Opened: 6 November 2013

Services
Preceding station	Kyiv Metro	Following station
Ipodrom towards Heroiv Dnipra	Obolonsko–Teremkivska line	Terminus
Location

Teremky (Ukrainian: Теремки,) is a station on the Obolonsko–Teremkivska Line of the Kyiv Metro system that serves Kyiv, the capital of Ukraine. The station opened on 6 November 2013. It is the southern end of the line, located just after the Ipodrom station. The station is named after the Teremky neighborhood of Kyiv.

At the opening of the Ipodrom station on 25 October 2012 (then) Ukrainian Prime Minister Mykola Azarov had stated that the Teremky station "would soon open". According to planning the station should have opened on 24 August 2013, Independence Day of Ukraine. But instead it was opened on 6 November 2013, on that day was celebrated Day of Kyiv's liberation from Nazi invaders.

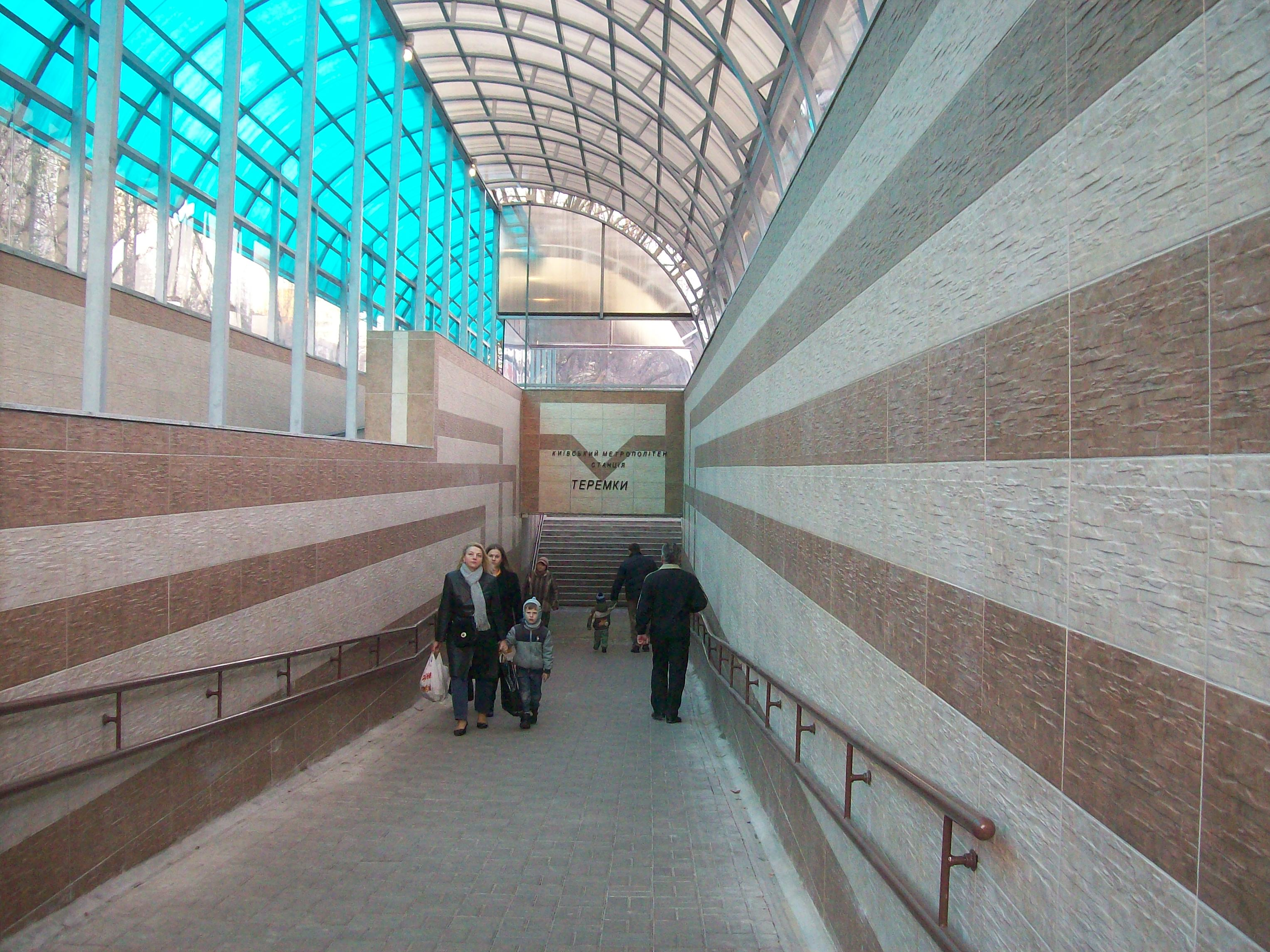
Entrance to the station

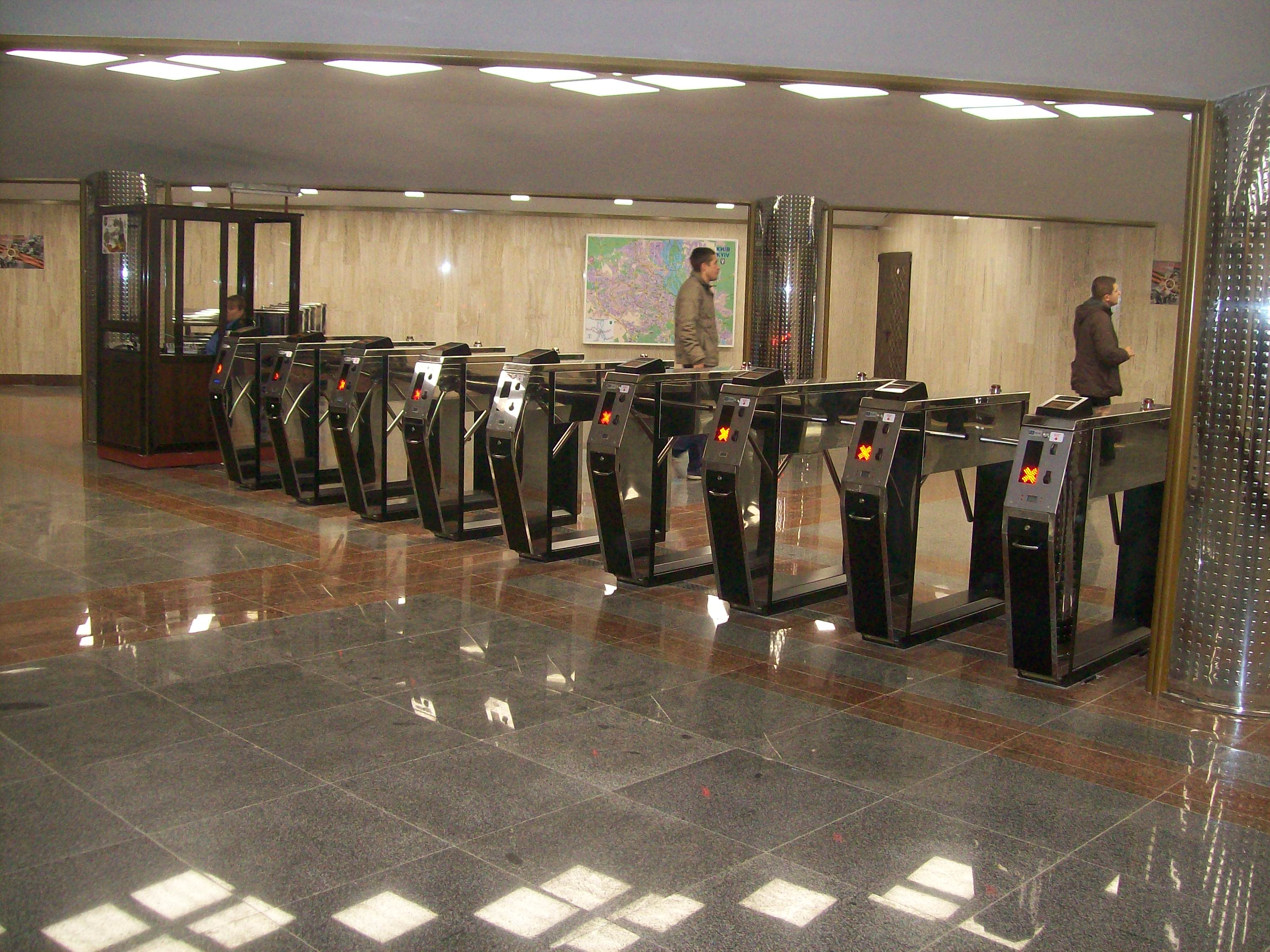
Token machines

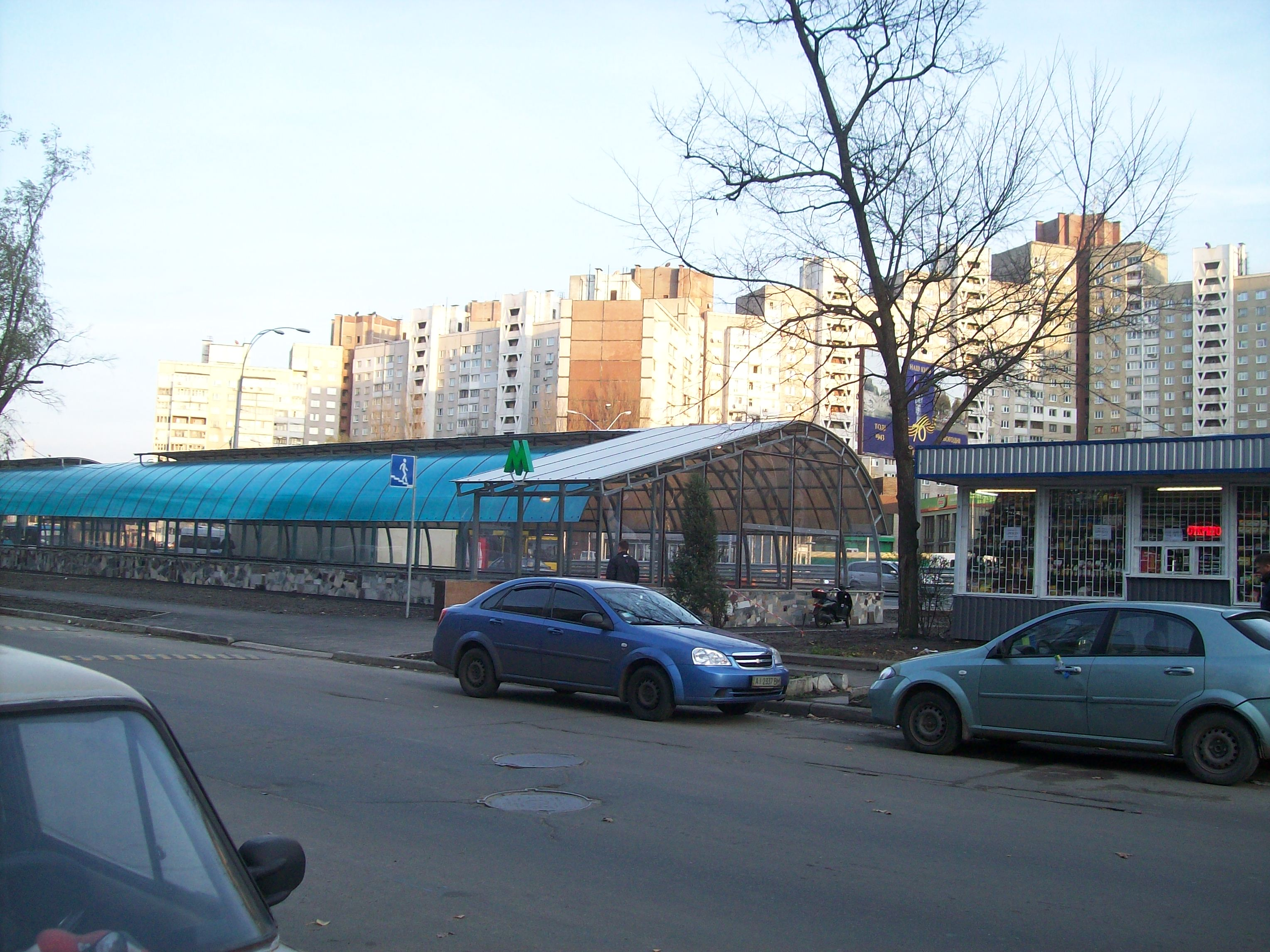
Outside appearance of station

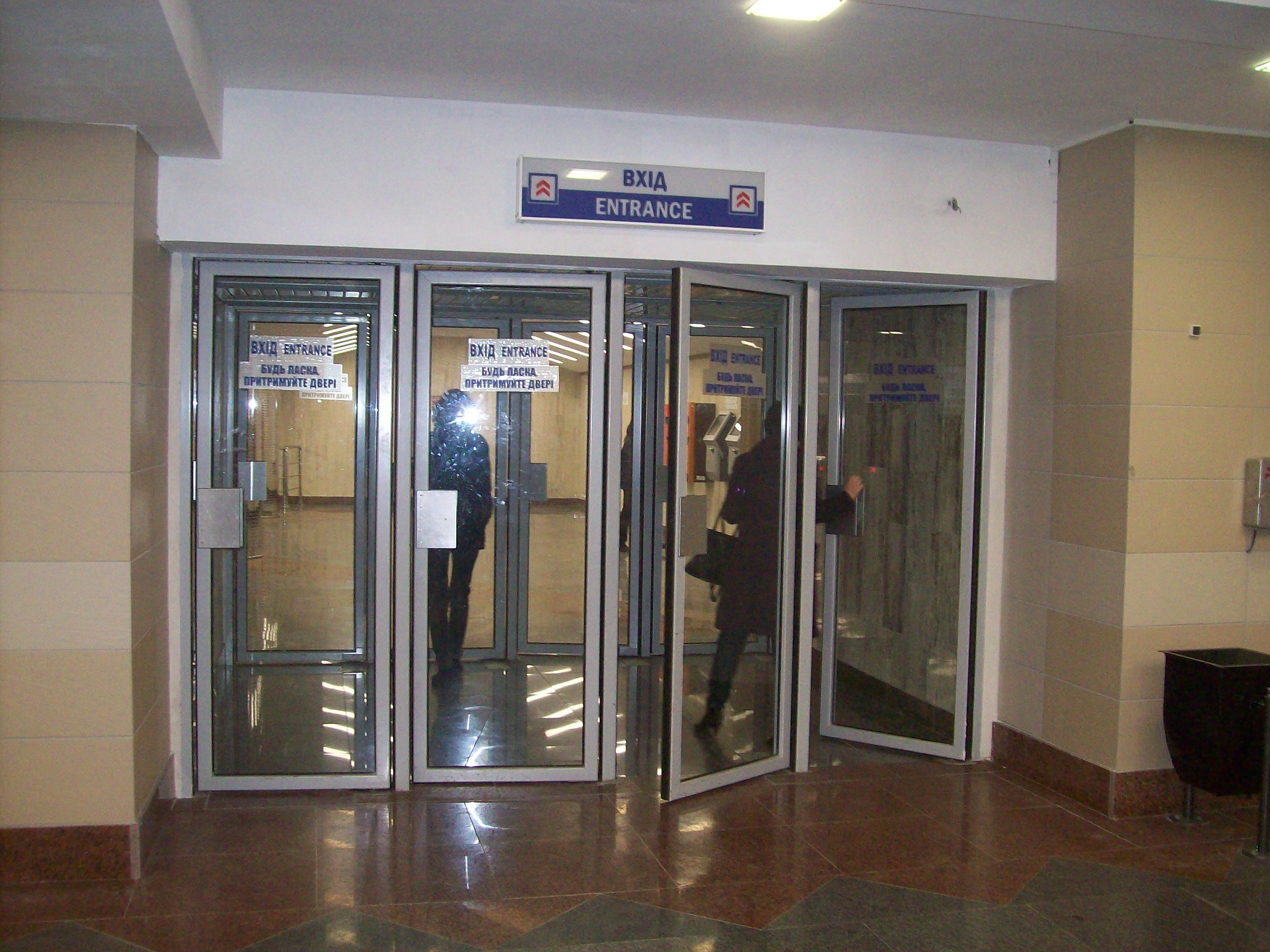
Entrance to the platform
