= Obolon, Kyiv =

Obolon Оболонь
- Neighborhood of Kyiv
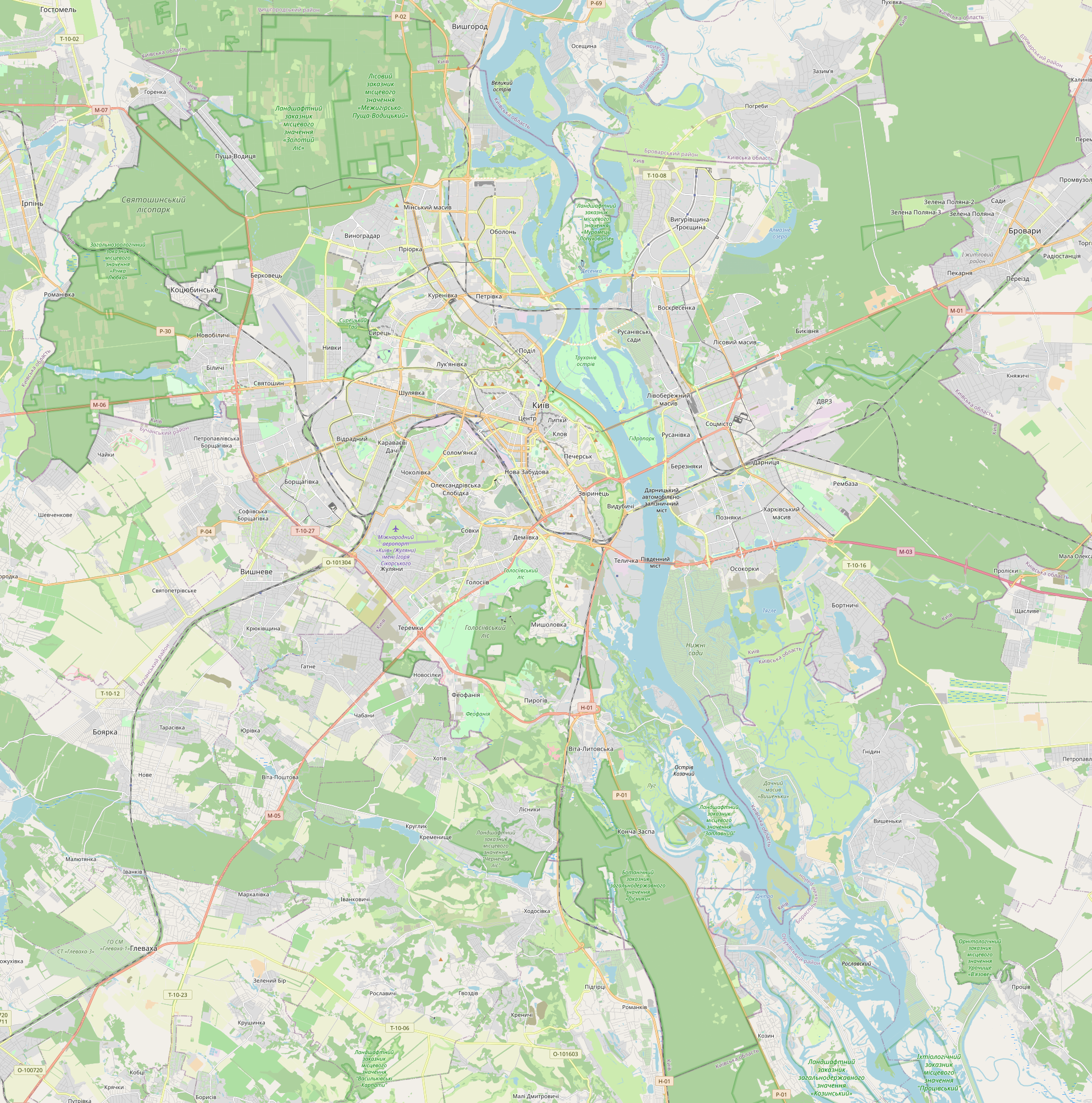
- Location within Ukraine Kyiv
- Coordinates: 50°30′20″N 30°29′57″E
- Country: Ukraine
- City: Kyiv
- District: Obolonskyi District
- First mentioned: 1096
- Time zone: UTC+2 (EET)
  - Summer (DST): UTC+3 (EEST)
- Postal code: 04504, 04205, 04209, 04210, 04211, 04212, 04213, 04214
- Area code: +380 44

Obolon (Ukrainian: Оболонь, pronounced [oboˈlɔnʲ]) is a historical locality which includes a residential area (masyv), along with an industrial park within Ukraine's capital Kyiv that is located on its northern side, in an eponymous city district - the Obolonskyi District (until 2001 – Minskyi District).

In Ukrainian language the word obolon' (оболонь) means a 'low country near a river' (floodplain) or 'flood-meadows' (Ukrainian: заплавні луки).

As Obolon's land regularly used to flood by the Dnieper river there were Kyiv city's pasture and haymakings.

== Geography ==
The suburb is located in the South of the Polisian Lowland, in the northern part of Kyiv city's area.

The Dnipro, its bays, small rivers, ponds and lakes around Obolon were used as sources of sand for the height elevation for the further building construction, using the hydraulic fill technology. Thus the Obolon landscape was significantly changed by people.

Obolon is isolated from other parts Kyiv city by the Dnipro river with its bays and a group of lakes.

It borders the Opechen lakes system in the west, which was supposedly created on the place where the legendary Pochaina River used to be. In 2016 some historians revealed that the river continues to exist and is located in the vicinity of mentioned system of lakes. The east boundary of the suburb is the Dnipro with its bays: the Sobache hyrlo (Dog's river mouth) and the Obolon bay (the former names the Starytsa, that can be translated as a former riverbed, or the Bratsky Staryk). There are Redkyne Lake (Ministerka) and the Verbliud (Camel) bay in the north of Obolon, which was created by the size expansion of Lukove Lake (Ulukovo) when soil from it was being taken. Verbne Lake (Willow) and the Vovkuvata bay are in the south of the suburb.

The closest suburbs to Obolon are Khutir Redky, Minskyi Masyv, Priorka, Petrivka belonging to the Obolonskyi District too and Kurenivka, Rybalskyi Ostriv belonging to the Podilskyi District of Kyiv.

By roads, the suburb is located:

- 10 km to the Kyiv city centre.
- 13 km to the city's central station - Kyiv-Pasazhyrskyi railway station.
- 16 km to Kyiv International Airport (Zhuliany)
- 43 km to the main city's airport - Boryspil International Airport.

There is Road P69 (Ukraine) (P69, Kyiv - Vyshhorod - Desna - Chernihiv) going through the western part of the suburb.

=== Historical map studies ===
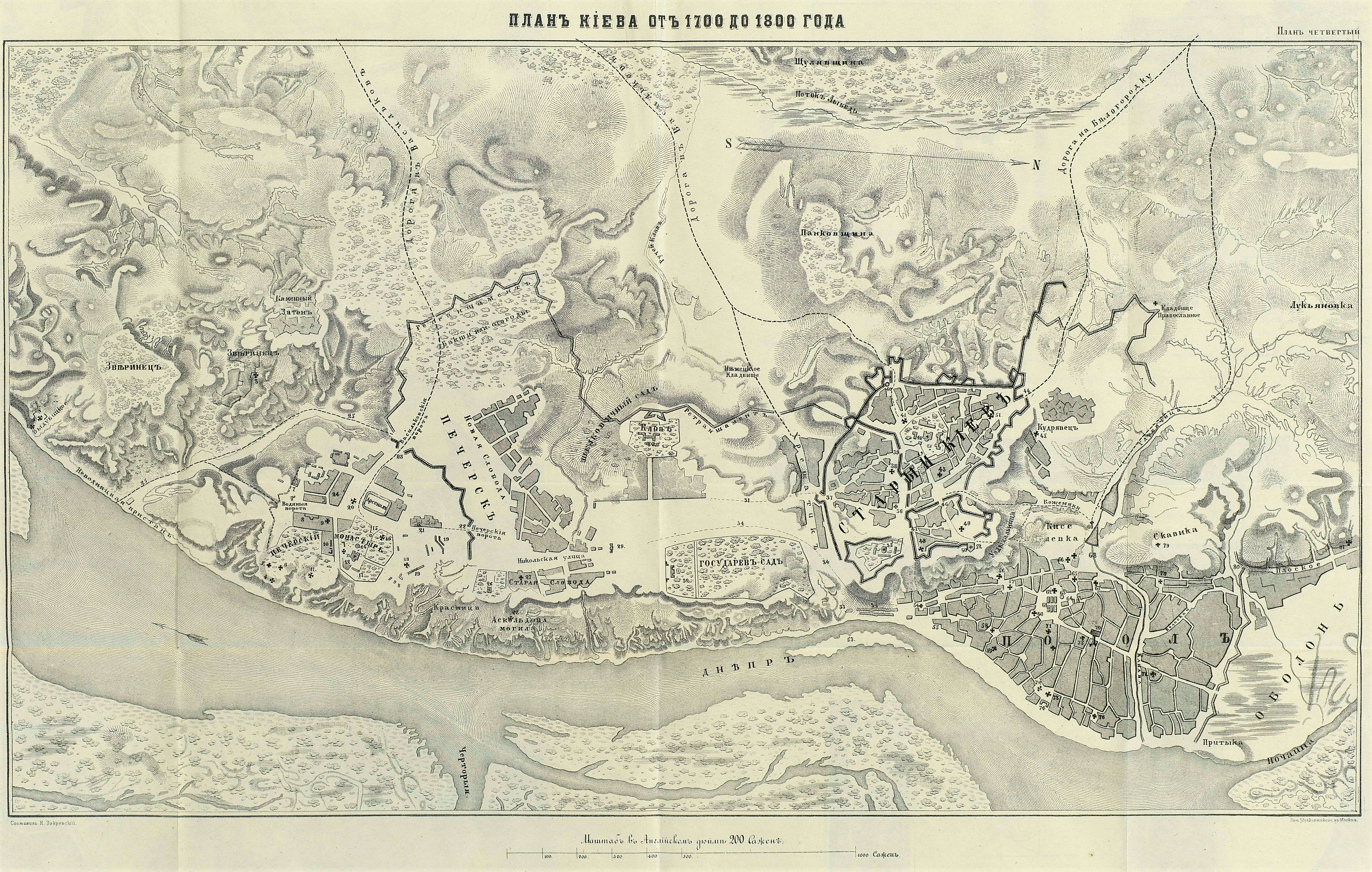
The map of Kyiv in the 18th century.

The Ukrainian historian Mykola Zakrevsky drew a series of Kyiv historical maps, since the Princess Olga time, the 20th century up to the 19th century. On all maps Obolon begins once city's rampart near Podil on the right bank of the Pochaina River, next to the present Taras Shevchenko metro station.

On the Kyiv map of 1902 year created by city's land surveyor Tairov, Obolon is depicted on the left bank of the Pochaina River mouth, where modern Rybalskyi Ostriv suburb is. There were city's pasture and haymakings marked on the place of the present-day Obolon suburb. All these terrains belonged to Kyiv's administrative division by then - the Ploskyi Uchastok (Плоскій Участокъ, the Flat Area).

== History ==
=== Early time ===
Around the chronicles Pochaina River, nowadays it is the Opechen lakes system, were found the Mesolithic and Zarubintsy culture archaeological sites.

Remains of settlements the 1th BC - 2nd AD centuries and the 6th - 7th centuries were found in Obolon.

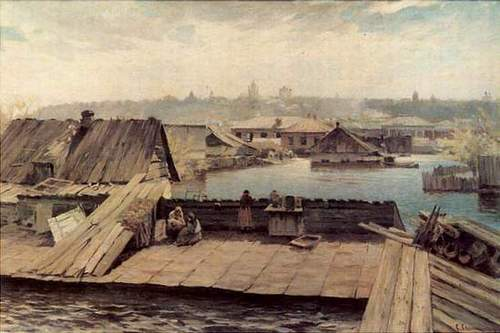
Flooding of Obolon in 1890s

The first who drew special attention to Obolon was the Ukrainian historian Volodymyr Antonovych, who got 200 bronze Roman coins there in 1876, which were dated the second half of 3rd - the first half of 4th centuries. Then he suggested that there was a settlement in Obolon, whose inhabitants conducted exchange with antiquity cities of the Northern Black Sea. Further Obolon was explored in particular by Turvont Kybalchych, Mykola Biliashivsky, Oleksandr Ertel, A. A. Piantkovsky, Valeriia Kozlovska and Petro Kurinny.

Before the Kievan Rus epoch it was a territory of Eastern Polans. The Veles worship place was there at the pagan times.

At the time of Kievan Rus and the Grand Duchy of Lithuania the land belonged to the Principality of Kyiv. Obolon often became a place of battles with nomads and during princely feuds.

After the Union of Lublin this territory was a part of the Kyiv Voivodeship of the Crown of the Kingdom of Poland of the Polish–Lithuanian Commonwealth.

At the time of the Cossack Hetmanate, Obolon belonged to the Kyiv Regiment. Obolon's pasture and haymakings were often an object of arguments between Cossacks, the city magistrate, monasteries and the garrison of Tsardom of Muscovy in Kyiv.

During the Russo-Turkish Wars, palisades were being built there.

In 1911 the Kurenivka civil aerodrome was opened on Obolon fields.

=== Soviet era ===
As a result of the Ukrainian–Soviet War (1917–1921) and the Polish–Soviet War (1919–1921) Kyiv City and its suburbs was finally captured by the Red Army.

In 1967 the development plan of Kyiv was approved, according to which residential areas would be constructed on wetlands on both sides of the Dnieper. Thus, using the hydraulic fill technology, а sand layer 4–5 metres in height was created above Obolon flood-meadows. In 1972 - 1980 the biggest housing estate of tower blocks in Kyiv was erected in Obolon.

In 1975 a new administrative unit - Minsky Raion was formed. It included the Obolon housing estate. Since the Kyiv administrative subdivision reform in 2001 Obolon suburb has belonged to the eponymous Obolon Raion, which was created on the Minsky Raion basis.

In 1972 - 1980 there is the biggest Kyiv's housing estate of 9 and 16 storey tower blocks erected in Obolon. The estate architects were Grygory Slutsky, Yurii Paskevych, Leonid Filenko, M. I. Kulchynsky, Z. G. Klebnikova and I. G. Verymovska. It is locally famous for its honeycomb-like neighborhood planned development with high-rising multi-story apartment complexes (see Public housing).

In 1980 in Obolon was officially opened the Obolon beer brewing company commemorated to the 1980 Summer Olympics.

== Present construction ==
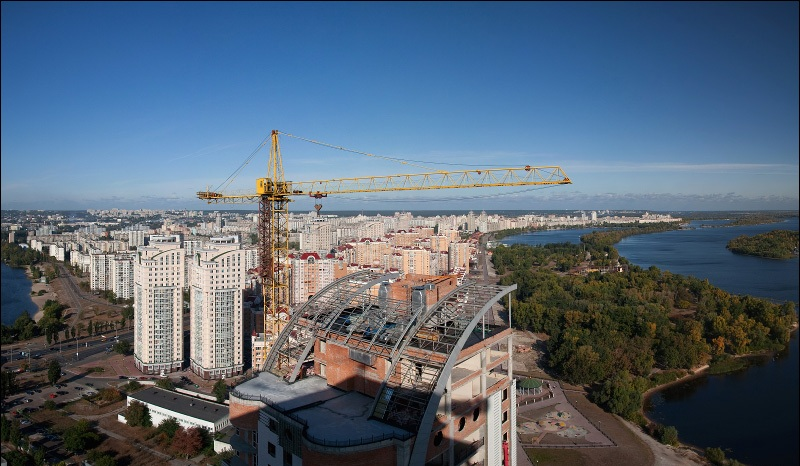
Obolon Lypky construction in 2009.

Since 1992 the modern housing estate Obolon Lypky was being built between the Dnieper River and Prospekt Volodymyra Ivasiuka, that includes tower blocks and mansions. It is called the analogy of the prestigious neighbourhood Lypky in the Pecherskyi District.

== Gallery ==
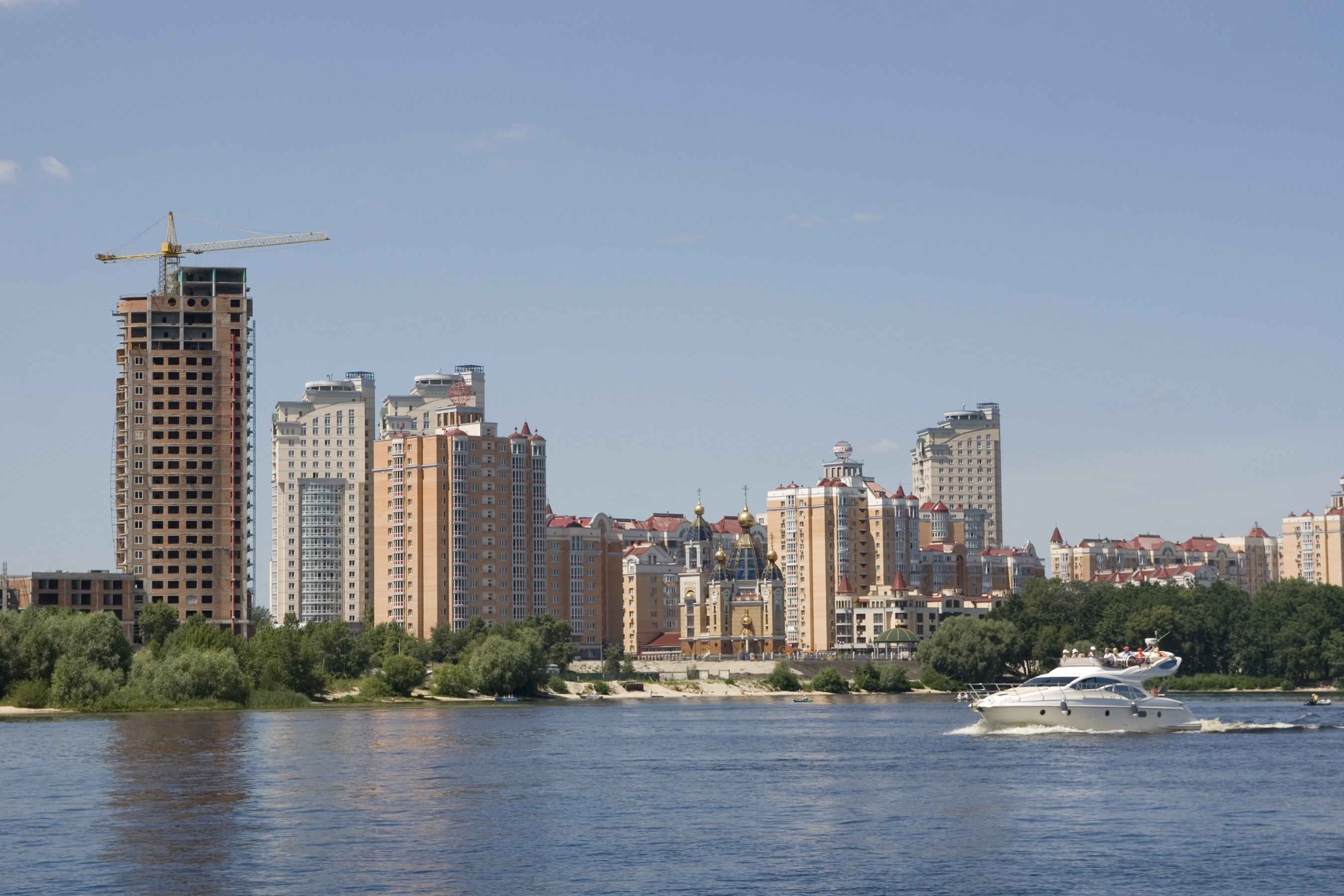
Apartment complexes seen from the river

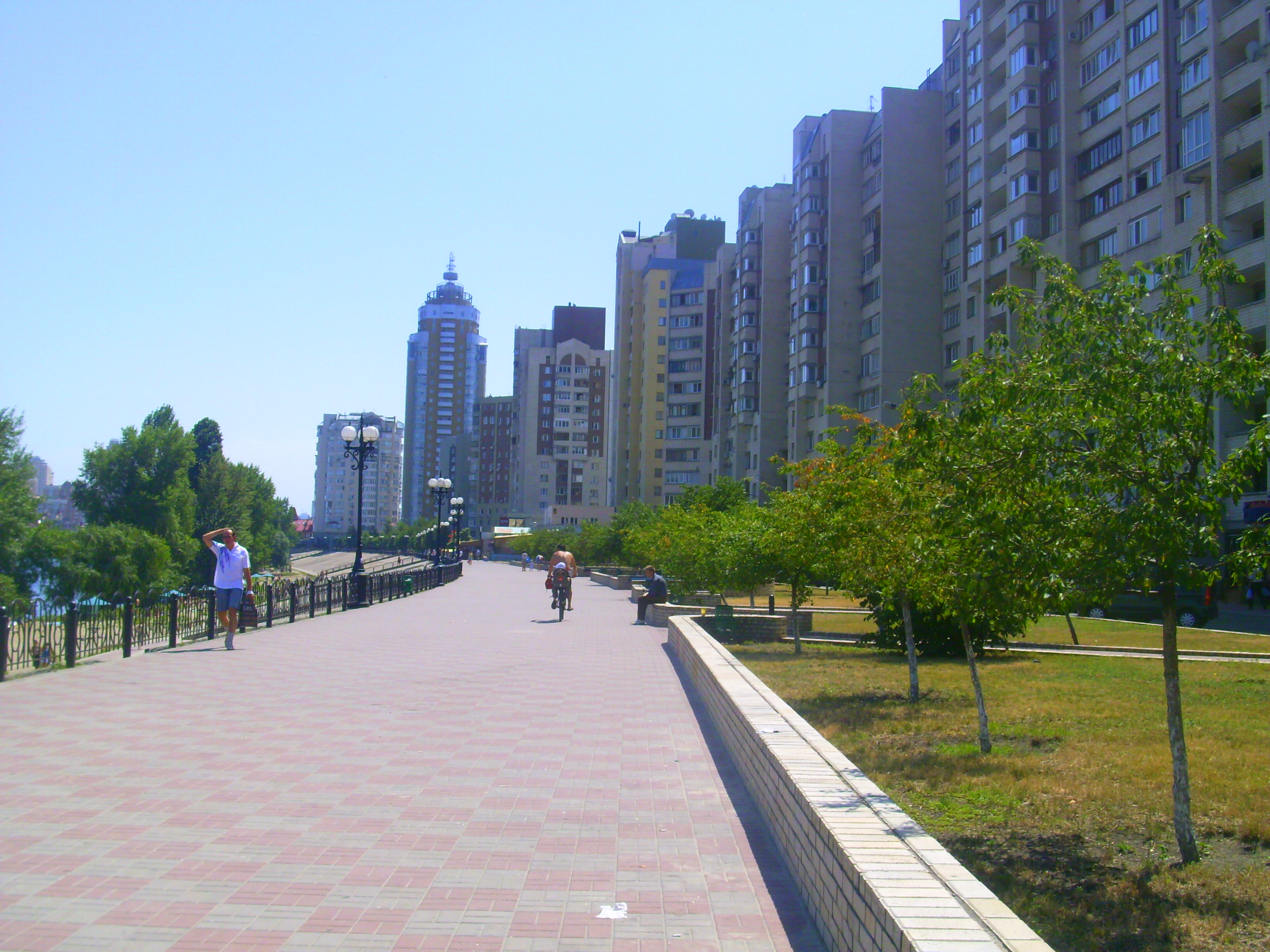
The embankment

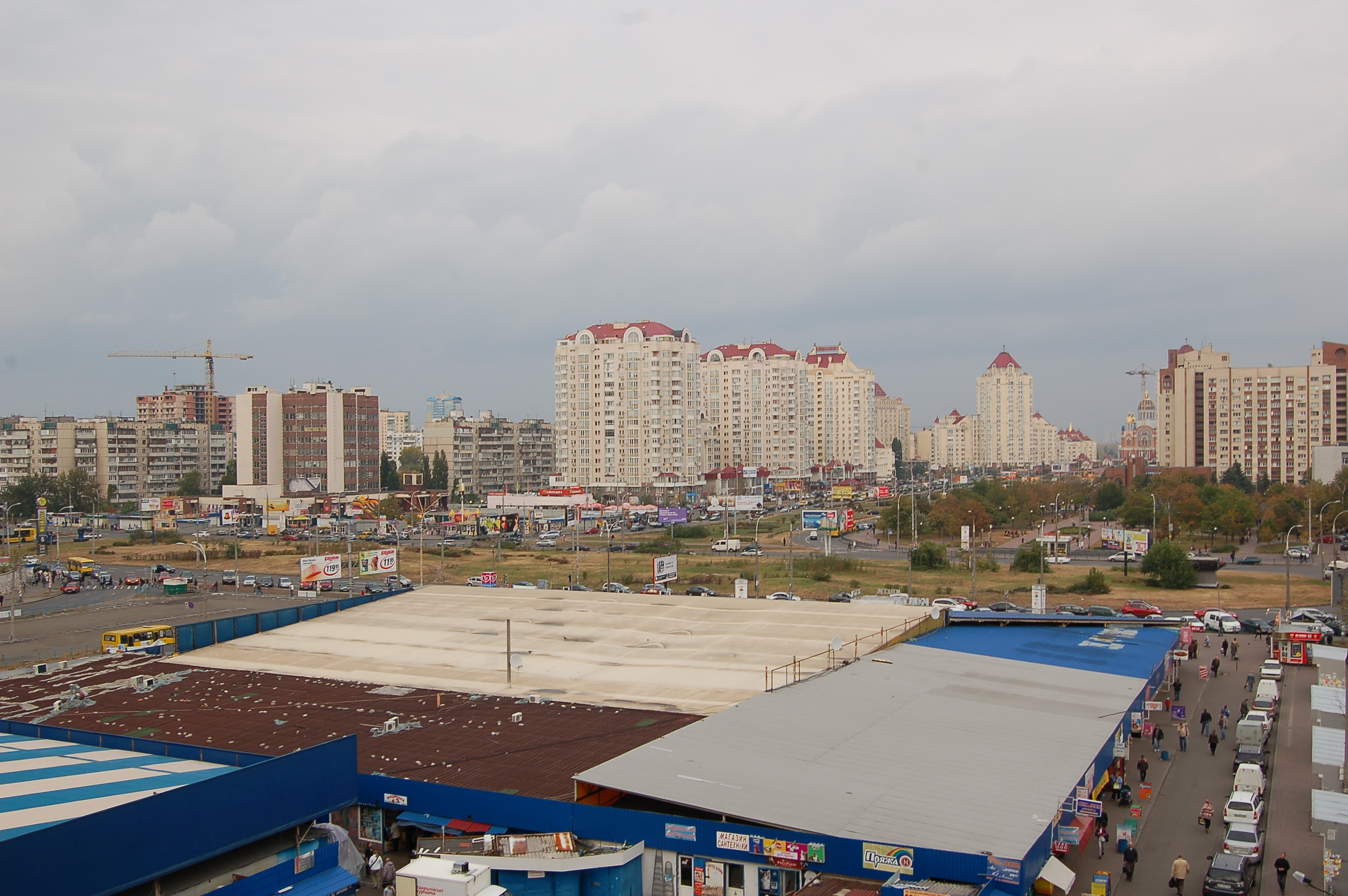
Minska ploshcha cityscape

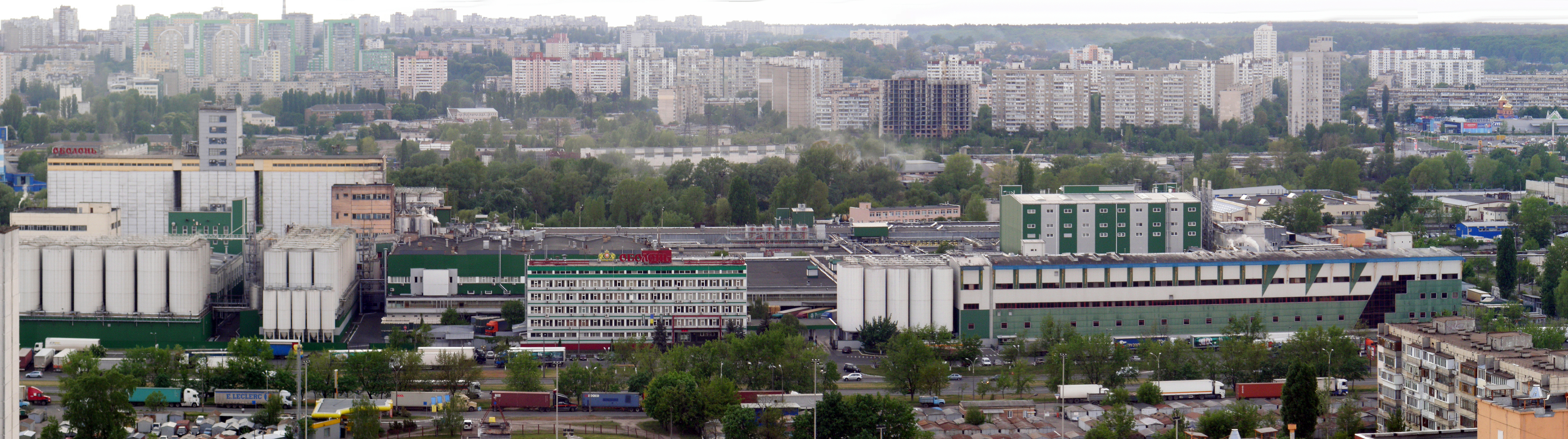
Obolon beer factory
