= Obolonskyi District =

Coordinates: 50°30′19.9″N 30°29′57.4″E

Obolonskyi District Оболонський район
- Urban district
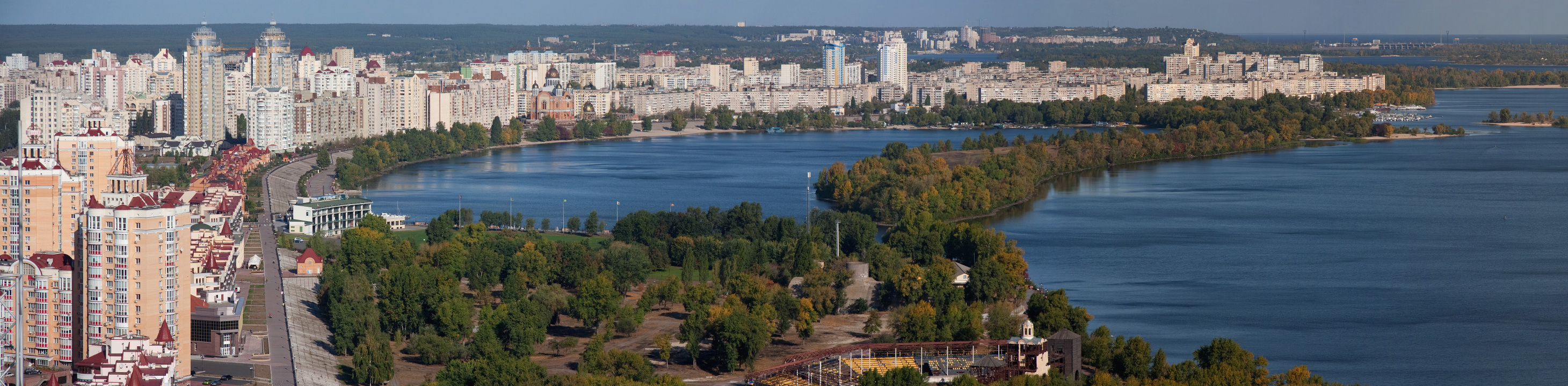
- View on the Obolon bay

- Flag Coat of arms

- Country: Ukraine
- City Municipality: Kyiv
- Main neighborhoods: List: Obolon itself; Kurenivka; Minskyi neighborhood; Priorka; Pushcha-Vodytsia

Government
  - Council Head: Kyrylo Fesyk

Area
  - Total: 108.6 km^{2} (41.9 sq mi)

Population
  - Total: 317,300
  - Density: 2,776/km^{2} (7,190/sq mi)
- Time zone: UTC+2 (EET)
  - Summer (DST): UTC+3 (EEST)
- Landmarks: Obolon CJSC
- Metro stations: Pochaina, Obolon, Minska, Heroiv Dnipra
- Website: obolon.kyivcity.gov.ua

Obolonskyi District (Note: Ukrainian: Оболонський район, romanized: Obolonskyi raion) is an urban district of the Ukrainian capital Kyiv. Obolonskyi District encompasses territories far beyond of its historical neighborhood sharing the same name. It was formed on 3 March 1975 and initially called as Minskyi District. In 2001 it was renamed after its historical neighborhood. Its current population is 290,000 inhabitants.

== Overview ==
The name of the district Obolon comes from the Old-Ukrainian word оболонь → болонь → болоньє (obolon' → bolon' → bolon'ye), which roughly translates as "flood plain" or an area that is being engulfed by water.

During Soviet rule of Ukraine, Kyiv had 14 administrative districts. In the early 21st century, a new law was passed, and the city's administrative division was reorganized into 10 districts with different borders and new names. Therefore, newer Obolonskyi District encompasses the territories of the former Minskyi District (based on Minskyi Masyv neirborhood) and is still sometimes referred to by that name. It also includes the former town of Pushcha-Vodytsia that used to be part of the Podilskyi District.

The district was built up in the 1970s as a microdistrict in Kyiv on the Obolon sands to satisfy the growth of the city. It was a northward expansion of the Kyiv city. Due to the composition of the soil at the time, the majority of the buildings were at most nine stories tall, and few trees were planted when compared to other parts of the city. That and few other reasons originally made the district not very prestigious. During the preparation to the 1980 Summer Olympics in Minskyi District of Kyiv was established a new brewery Obolon.

With the second construction period (2000–2005), the district has seen new, comfortable apartment buildings constructed closer to the Dnieper river and has become an attractive residential area. The new flats are also much more expensive, although still cheaper than in the central parts of Kyiv. The district was connected by metro in the 1980s, with a station Obolon opened on 5 November 1980.

A yachting club for both kids and adults was opened in around 1990, and recently many of the Obolon lakes were cleaned up to make the area more attractive. The area closer to the Dnieper river is a popular relaxation place for Kyiv residents. The area is also well known for the beer factory Obolon CJSC.

Park Natalka is among the recreational spaces favoured by Kyiv residents. It is located along the Dnieper river.

== Population ==
=== Language ===
Distribution of the population by native language according to the 2001 census:

Language	Number	Percentage
Ukrainian	212 952	70.31%
Russian	71 483	23.60%
Other (Note: Those who did not indicate their native language or indicated a language that was native to less than 1% of the local population.)	18 439	6.09%
Total	302 874	100.00%

== Major neighborhoods ==
- Obolon, a residential area (masyv) and an industrial zone of the Kyiv city. It is located between Dnieper river, Stepan Bandera Avenue, Verbova Street, and Dehtyarenko Street.
- Kurenivka (1723–1833), an area towards the downtown of Kyiv. In the 17th century it used to be a suburb of the Kyiv city where the Kyiv Cossack Kosh was garrisoned. Its name is derived from one of the cossack's military formations, kurin (company). In the 18th century there was built the Petropavlivska Church that in the Soviet times was destroyed and rebuilt under one of the industrial buildings. Kurenivka also became famous for a massive tragedy of the Kurenivka mudslide in 1961.
- Priorka (1629–1880), it is believed to be settled by monks (priors) of the Dominican Order on the road to Vyshhorod. Since 1834 the settlement was incorporated into the Kyiv-city.
- Minsky masyv, a residential area (masyv) of Kyiv. It is located between Shevchenko Square, Minsk Parkway, Konradyuk Street, Maiorov Street, Panch Street, Polyarna Street. The area also contains "sub-neighborhood" Kyn-Grust.
- Petrivka
- Pushcha-Vodytsia (1798–2001)

== Gallery ==
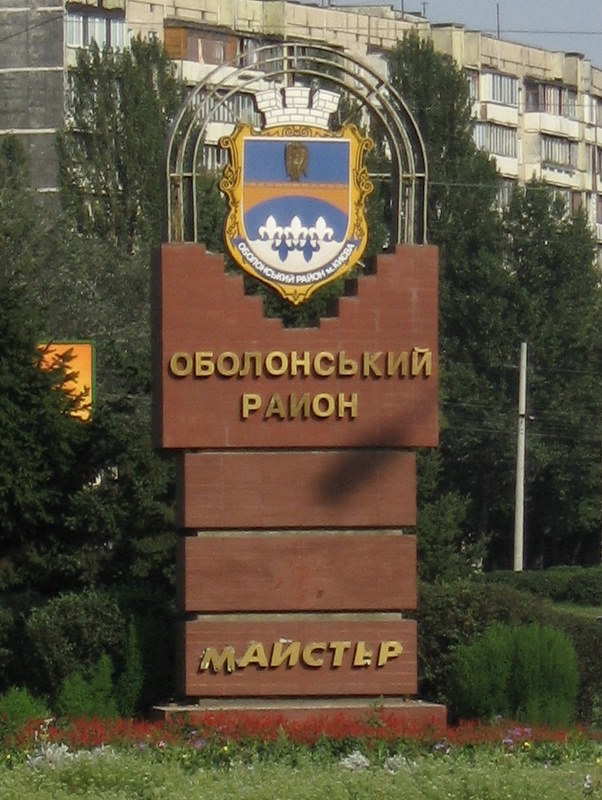
The sign when entering the district

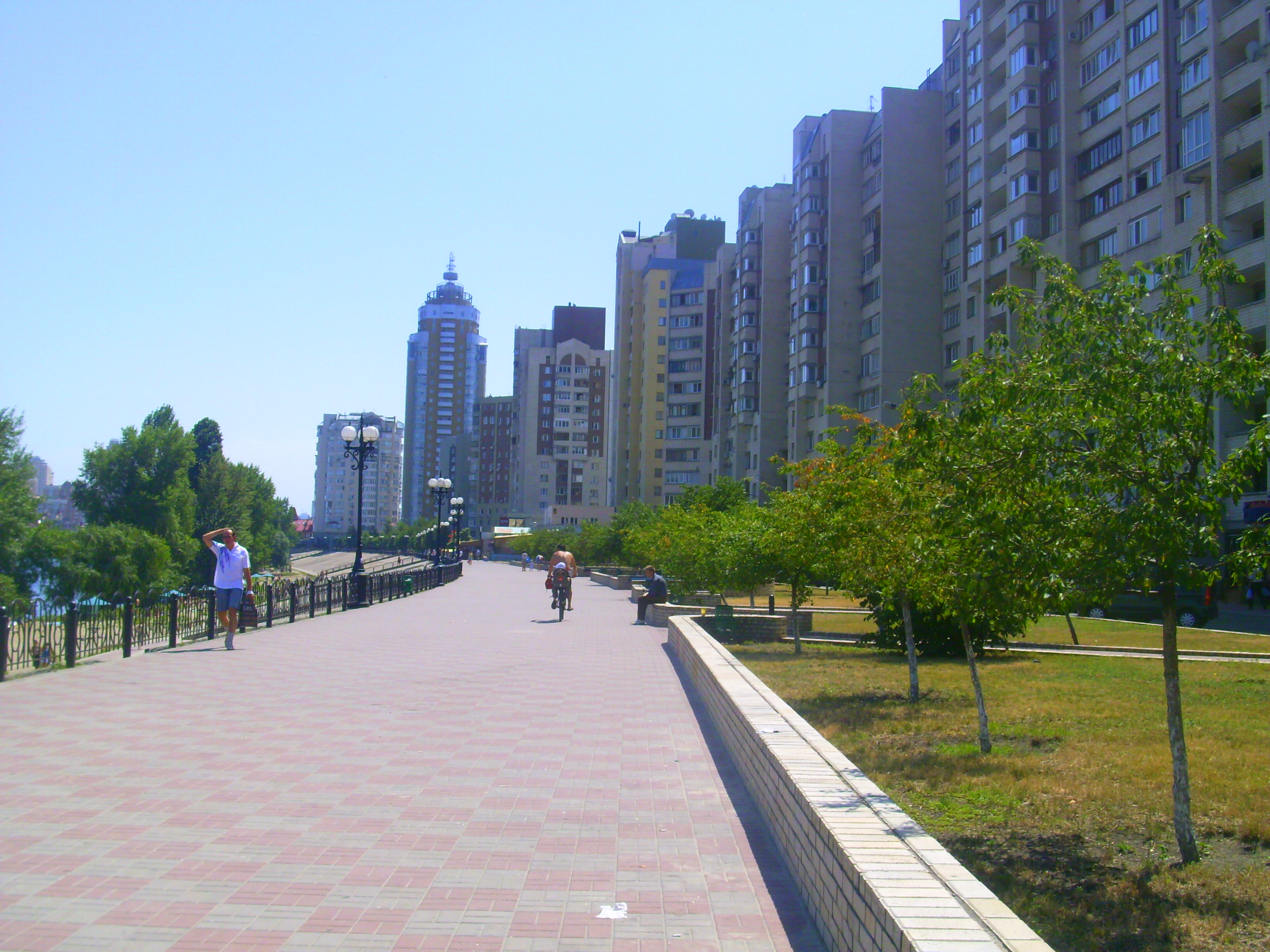
Obolon embankment

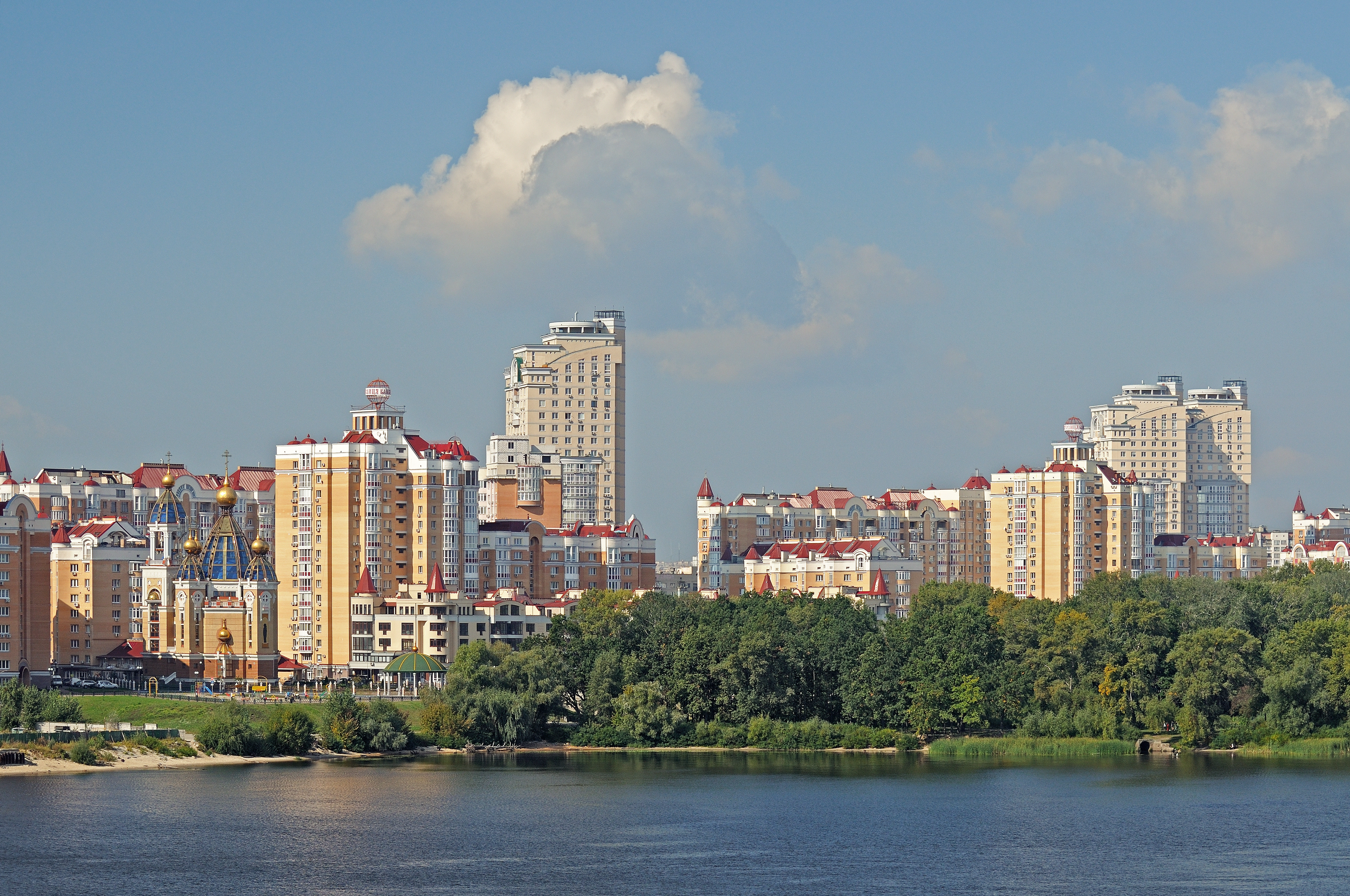
Bank of the Dnieper River

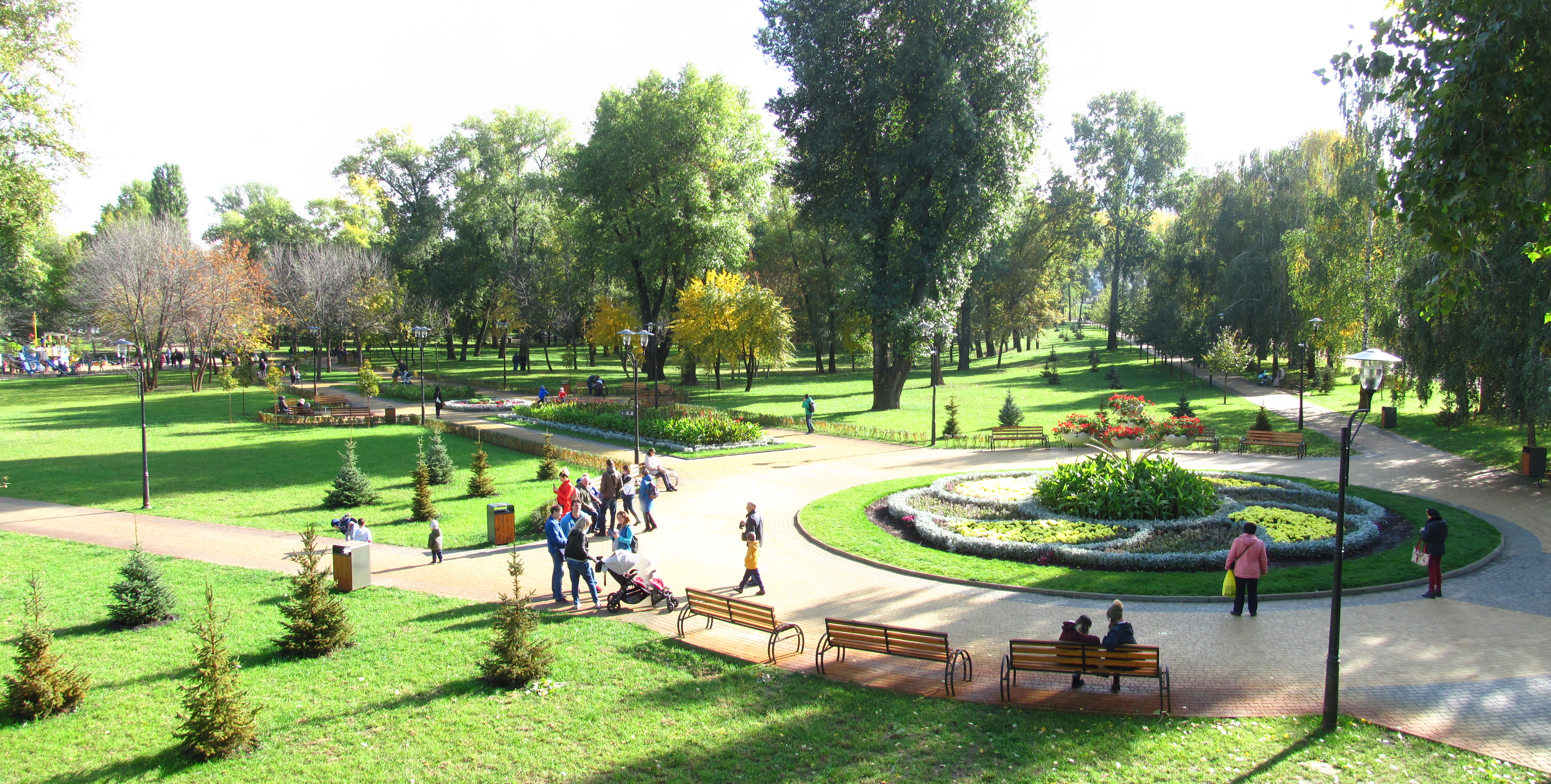
Natalka park

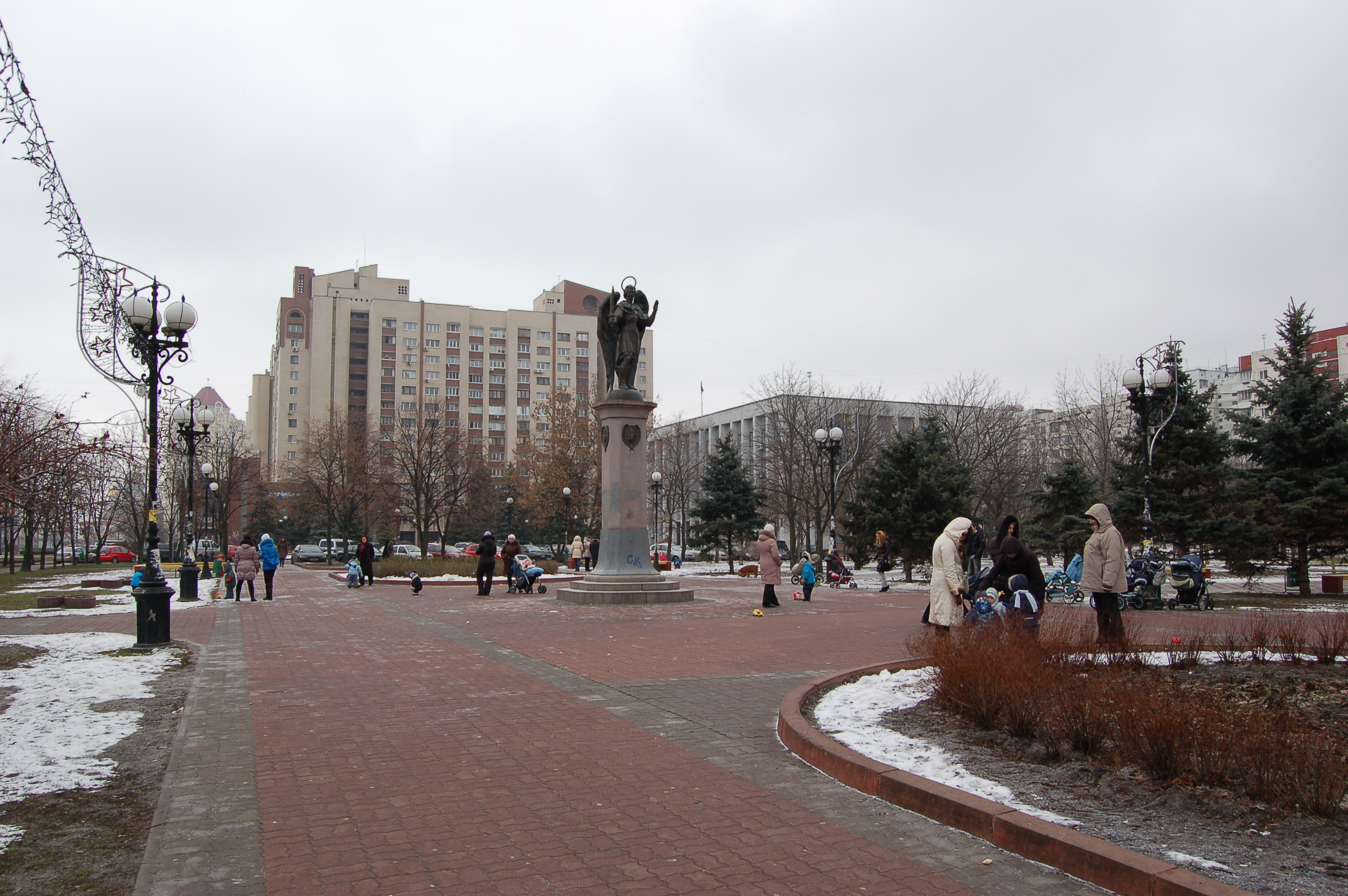
Minska Square

== See also ==
- Subdivisions of Kyiv
