= Pushcha-Vodytsia =

Neighborhood in Kyiv, Ukraine

Coordinates: 50°32′26″N 30°21′10″E

Pushcha-Vodytsia (Note: sometimes spelled Pushcha-Voditsa, Ukrainian: Пуща-Водиця; Russian: Пуща-Водица) is a historic neighbourhood, climate resort and a former urban-type settlement (1981–2001) in the northwestern part of Kyiv (Obolon Raion). Located within a dense forest and away from the urban Kyiv, it is known for number of sanatoriums and state cottages for government officials such as presidents, prime-ministers etc.

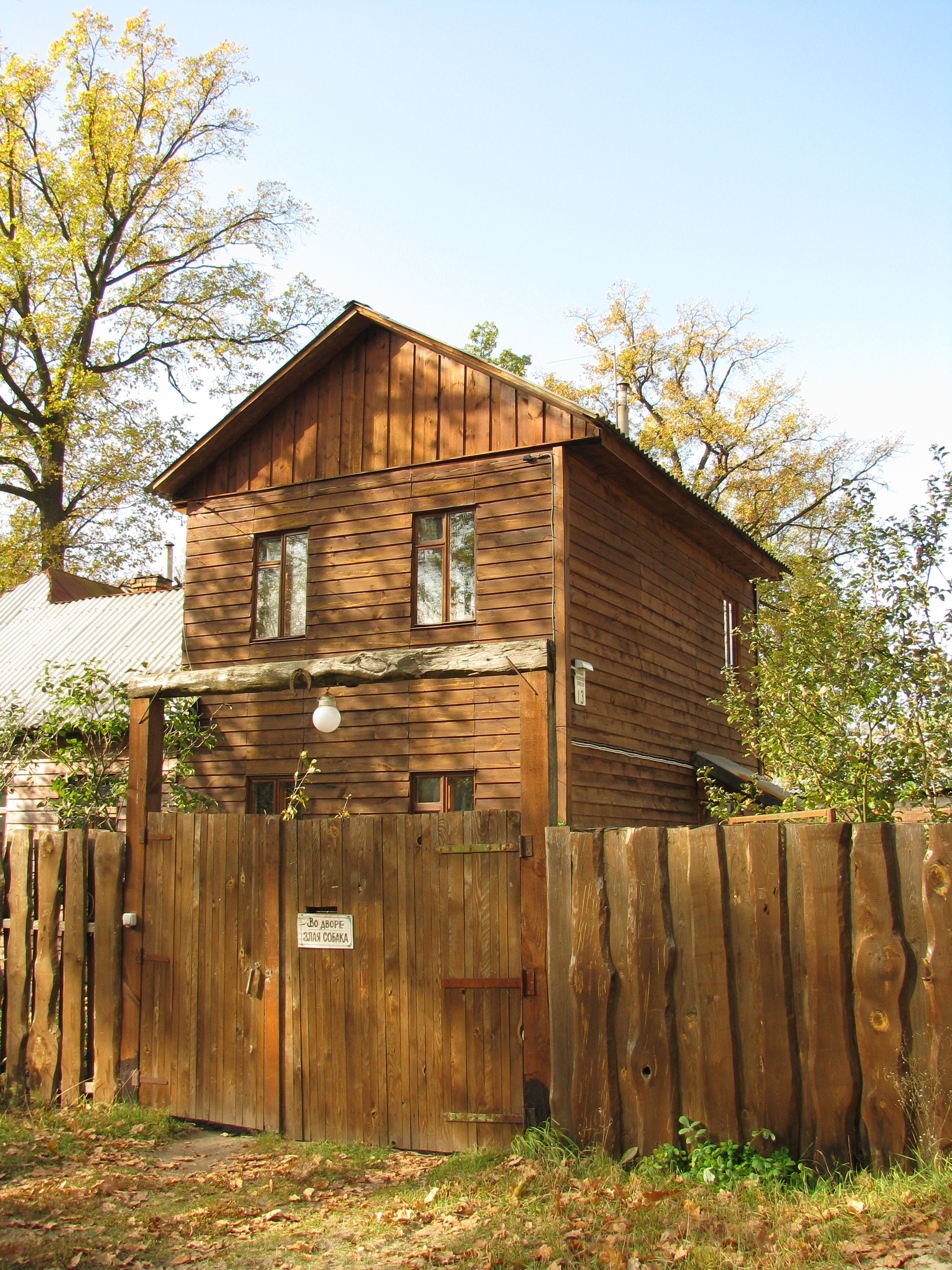
Wooden cottage in Pushcha-Vodytsia

The southern border of the neighborhood is considered Hostomelske Highway, the eastern – Minskyi Avenue, the western – the road to the village of Moshchun, Bucha Raion (Kyiv Oblast). The area stretches north to the village of Demydiv, Vyshhorod Raion (Kyiv Oblast). The name was combined from two Slavic words, pushcha (пуща), which stands for a dense forest, and Vodytsia (Водиця), the name of a nearby river (not existing).

In 1724 by the orders of Peter I here was established a forestry. Until the end of the 18th century the area was contested between the Mezhyhirya Monastery and Brotherhood Monastery. In 1793 the argument was decided by the Senate transferring the neighborhood into the possession of the Kyiv city as a cottage settlement Pushcha-Vodytsia, which soon turned into a small khutor.

In 1899, a dacha- or cottage-type settlement was founded in the Pushcha-Vodytsia forests. Later on, Soviet sanatoriums were located in the settlement, as well as in other settlements nearby. In 1981, the village acquired the status of an urban-type settlement, subordinate to the Podilskyi Raion (district) of Kyiv, later in 2002 the area was passed to the Obolon Raion, and settlement lost its separate administration.

== History ==
=== Middle Ages ===
The "forest and great pinewood" located on the outskirts of ancient Kyiv is mentioned in chronicles dating back to the early 11th century. According to these chronicles, the area has been known since the time of Kyi, Shchek and Khoryv. From the 11th century onward, it is recorded as a princely hunting ground (chronicles from 1009–1010 mention hunting expeditions by Prince Volodymyr).

=== Modern Era ===
In 1571, the Polish king Sigismund II Augustus issued a charter granting townspeople the right to "enter these forests... and freely gather firewood." By order of Peter I in 1724–1725, a forestry enterprise was established within the protected area.

In 1793, the territory was transferred to the ownership of Kyiv as the "Pushcha-Vodytsia Forest Dacha." Between 1794 and 1798, the khutor (hamlet) of Pushcha-Vodytsia was mentioned in records. Since then, the northwestern outskirts of Kyiv have been known as Pushcha-Vodytsia. Its territory has long been covered by forest, which for centuries was the subject of disputes between the Mezhyhirya Monastery and the Kyiv Epiphany (Bratsky) Monastery. In 1793, the dispute was resolved when the Senate transferred the area to municipal ownership. The "city forest dacha" covered an area of 3,180 desyatinas and was managed (somewhat negligently) by the forestry service. In the 16th–18th centuries, these lands were held by Kyiv burghers.

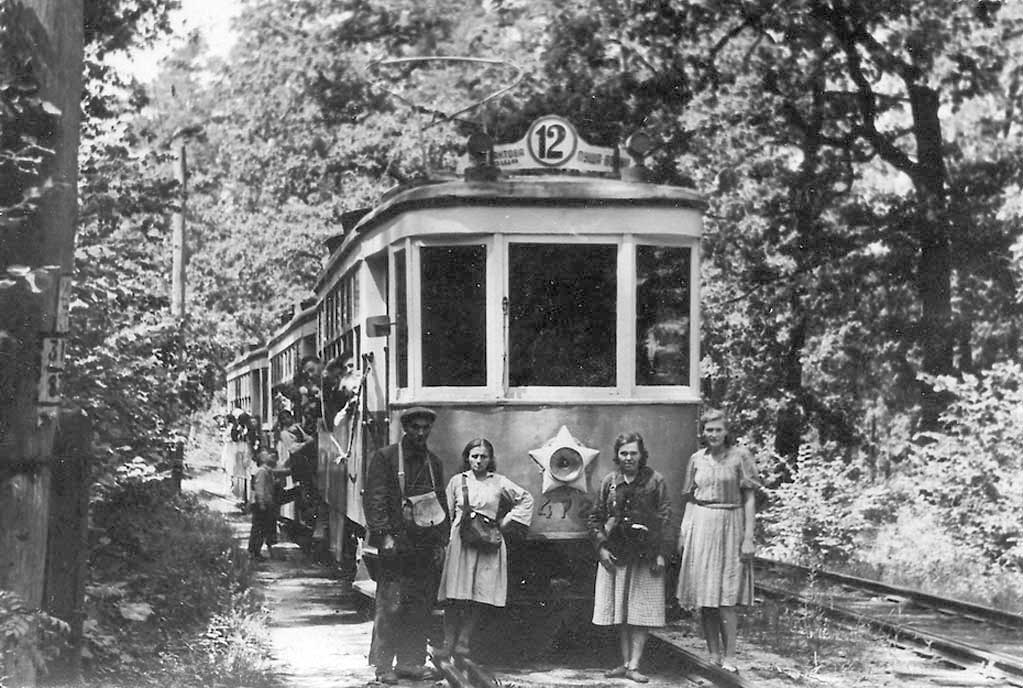
A tram in Pushcha-Vodytsia (1949)

A significant role in the development of the Pushcha-Vodytsia dacha settlement at the end of the 19th century was played by Kyiv physicians Feofil Yanovsky and R. R. Rubinstein, on whose initiative the first sanatoriums were built in Pushcha and patients began renting dachas. Member of the Kyiv City Duma and head of the Kyiv merchant guild Mykola Chokolov also contributed significantly to the settlement's creation, proposing in 1883 to organize a dedicated dacha locality. A dacha settlement comprising 600 plots appeared in Pushcha-Vodytsia ten years later, in 1893. The settlement lay between the Koturka and Horenka rivers and consisted of 7 streets intersected by 16 numbered "lines." Its principle of self-governance resembled a classic garden city: plots were leased to individuals on a long-term basis, while the Kyiv City Duma retained ownership of the forest lands. Each plot measured 2,700 square meters, had to be developed within two years of signing the lease, and required a house of at least 72 square meters. Notable dacha owners in Pushcha-Vodytsia included architects Volodymyr Nikolayev and Eduard-Ferdinand Bradtman, as well as industrialists Y. Rikhert and I. Snizhko; architect Vladislav Horodecki also frequented the area.

In 1904, the first tram line was launched here. Conductors traditionally announced the names of the numbered lines with the same solemnity as station announcements at Black Sea resorts in Odesa. Located along the quiet Vodytsia stream, the area became a major health resort. Scientists regarded it as a natural inhalatorium saturated with ozone and oxygen, beneficial to human health. Consequently, around 40 sanatoriums, rest homes, preventoriums, and children's health centers were built in the area.

Prior to the October Revolution of 1917, Pushcha-Vodytsia hosted clandestine May Day gatherings, a Bolshevik conference (1907), a meeting of the Kyiv Committee of the RSDLP (1911), and a session of the All-Ukrainian Provisional Party Committee (June 1918). During the period of political reaction following the defeat of the 1905–1907 Revolution, revolutionaries hid from persecution in the forests. In 1912, more than 200 people attended one of the May Day gatherings in Pushcha-Vodytsia.

=== Contemporary Period ===
During World War II, the front line of the Lyutezh bridgehead ran through the forest park. It was from here that Soviet troops entered the streets of Kyiv on 6 November 1943. Reminders of the fighting—such as shell craters, collapsed trenches, and abandoned dugouts—can still be found in parts of the Pushcha-Vodytsia forest.

In the dense woods near Mostyshche, Horenka, and the Hnylyi Lis tract, redoubts dating back to the War of 1812 also survive, and one of the forest clearings near the village of Lyutezh is locally known as Kutuzov's clearing. Between 1806 and 1810, Mikhail Kutuzov, later the strategist of the Battle of Borodino, served as Military Governor of Kyiv and conducted local militia drills here in preparation for defending the city against Napoleon's forces.

During the Soviet era, numerous sanatoriums, rest homes, and Pioneer camps operated here, located both within the settlement itself and deeper in the forest (such as "Pushcha-Ozerna" and "Lisova Poliana"). Medical indications included active pulmonary tuberculosis, as well as diseases and traumatic injuries of the peripheral nervous system, operating year-round.

In 1981, Pushcha-Vodytsia was granted the status of an urban-type settlement and was subordinated on 21 September 1981 to Kyiv's Podilskyi District. On 14 March 2002, the settlement and its settlement council were abolished, removed from the administrative register, and incorporated into the Obolonskyi District of Kyiv, a status Pushcha-Vodytsia retains today.

== Transport ==
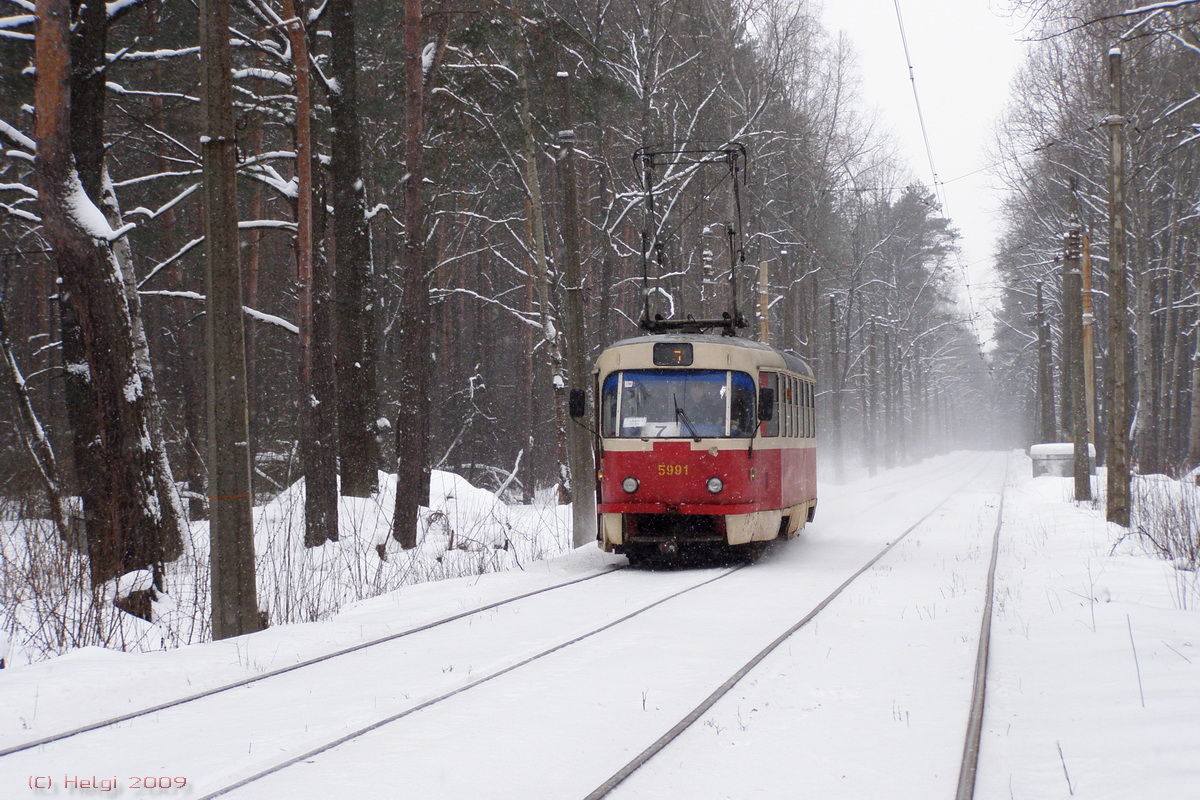
An old tram in Pushcha-Vodytsia

Pushcha-Vodytsia is connected to Kyiv via Miska Street. A tram line—opened in 1900 and electrified in 1904—links Pushcha-Vodytsia with Taras Shevchenko Square, Kurenivka, Podil, and Obolon. This historic forest tram line, unique in Ukraine, runs directly through the woods and is served by tram routes No. 12 and No. 17. Pushcha-Vodytsia is also connected to Kyiv by municipal bus route No. 30 and marshrutka routes No. 719 and No. 719-2 (suspended during the war).

== Historic buildings ==
A 1910 church designed by Eduard Bradtman still stands in the city. In 2023, a wooden estate, a unique example of architecture from a century ago, was burned down after two previous arson attempts.
