= Mikhail Sazhin =

Mikhail Sazhin may refer to:

- Mikhail Sazhin (astrophysicist) (born 1951), Russian astrophysicist
- Mikhail Sazhin (colonel) (1899–1971), Russian military leader
- Mikhail Sazhin (painter) (1818–1885), Russian landscape painter
- Mikhail Sazhin (revolutionary) (1845–1934), Russian revolutionary and anarchist
