= Pushcha-Vodytsia Forest =

Forest in Ukraine

Pushcha-Vodytsia Forest (Ukrainian: Пуща-Водицький ліс, romanized: Pushcha-Vodytskyi lis), also known as Pushcha-Vodytsia Forest-Park, is a woodland located in the north of Kyiv city between Kyiv–Kovel Highway, Velyka Kiltseva Road and Bohatyrska Street. The territory of forest belongs to the communal company "Sviatoshyn Forestry" and is a part of Holosiiv National Nature Park. The name of the forest comes from Pushcha-Vodytsia, a historic neighborhood of Kyiv.

Forest floral composition consists of mixed type with predominant sections of dense pine forest.

In 2005 parts of the forest was turned into a forest preserve of local significance.

== See also ==
- Pushcha-Vodytsia
