= Pochaina =

Pochaina may refer to:

- Pochaina (river), a steeped-in-legend river in Kyiv
- Pochaina (Kyiv Metro), a subway station in Kyiv
- Pochaina railway station, a railway station in Kyiv
- 3441 Pochaina, a main-belt asteroid
