= Pochaina, Kyiv =

Pochaina
- Neighborhood of Kyiv
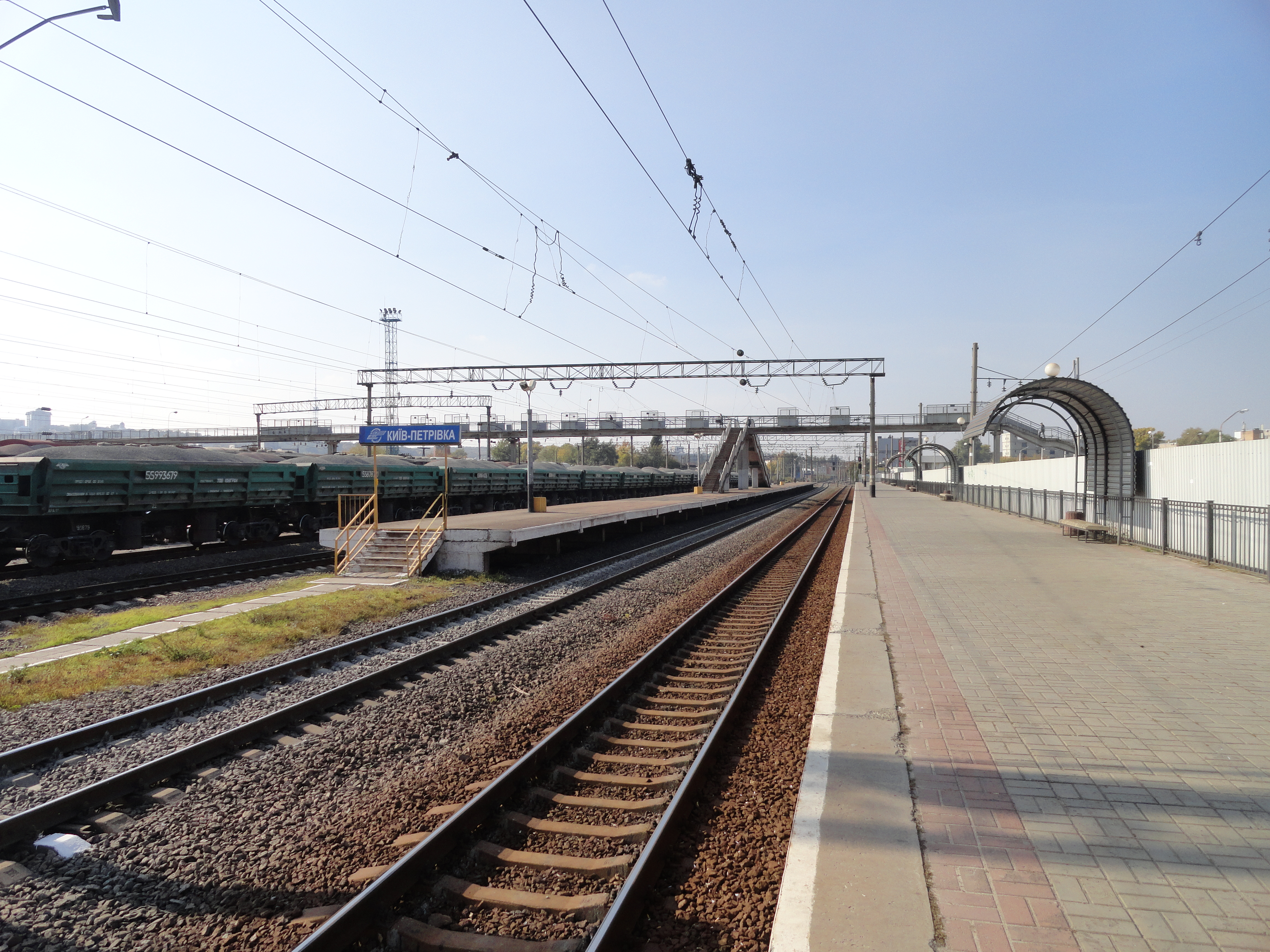
- Pochaina Railway station

- Location within Kyiv Oblast
- Coordinates: 50°29′13″N 30°29′52″E
- Country: Ukraine
- City: Kyiv
- District: Obolonskyi District

Pochaina (Ukrainian: Почайна), formerly known as Petrivka (Ukrainian: Петрівка), is a neighborhood located in the Obolonskyi District (district) of Kyiv, the capital of Ukraine. It is located in the northern part of the city, neighboring the historical neighborhood of the Podil itself to its south.

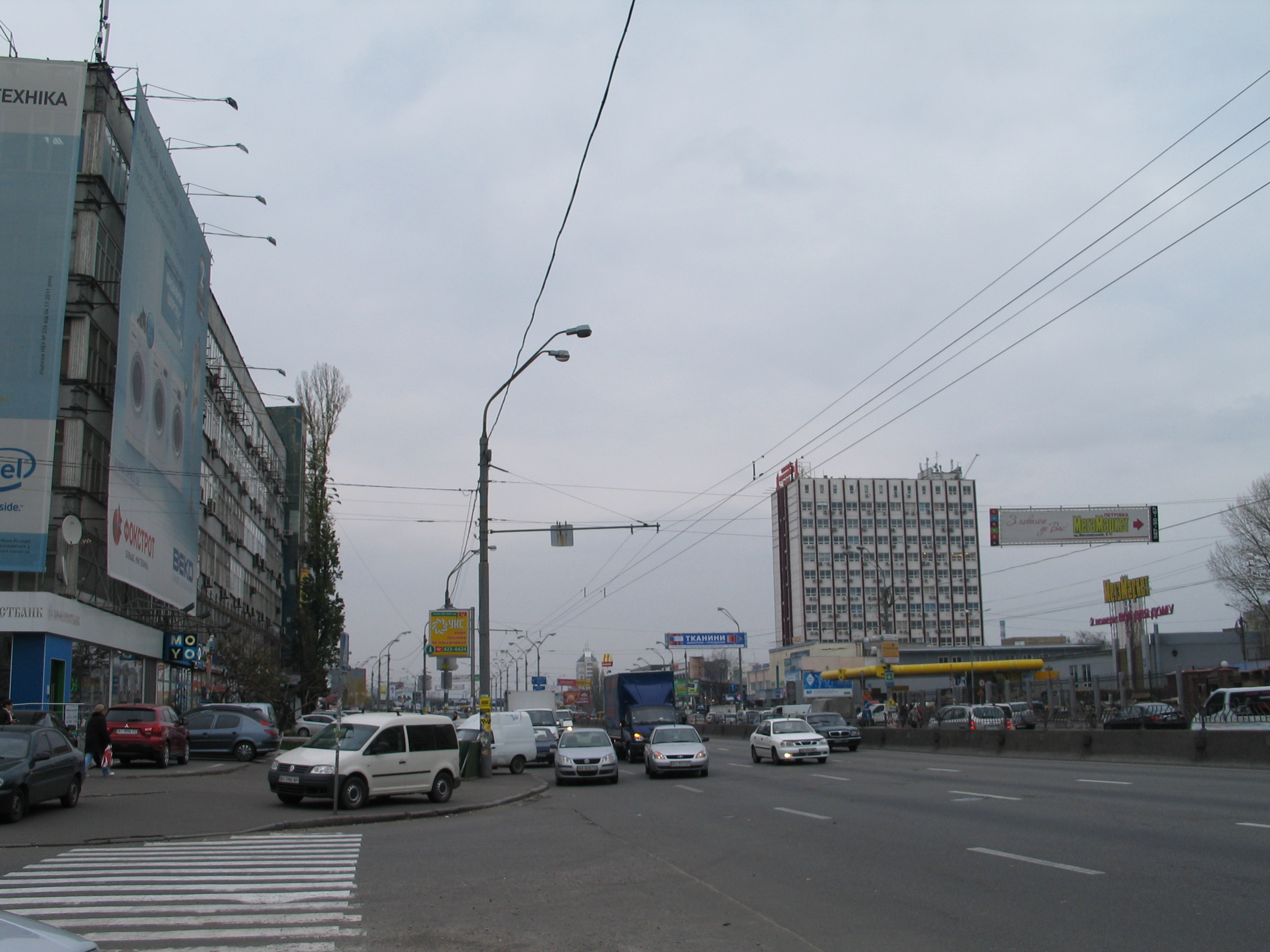
Prospect Stepana Bandery (formerly Moskovsky prospect)

One of the city's largest book markets is located in the neighborhood. Pochaina is served by a Pochaina metro station of the Kyiv Metro's Obolonsko–Teremkivska Line, and the Pochaina railway station of the Ukrzaliznytsia.
