= Mikhail Sazhin (painter) =

Painter (1818–1885)

Mikhail Makarovich Sazhin
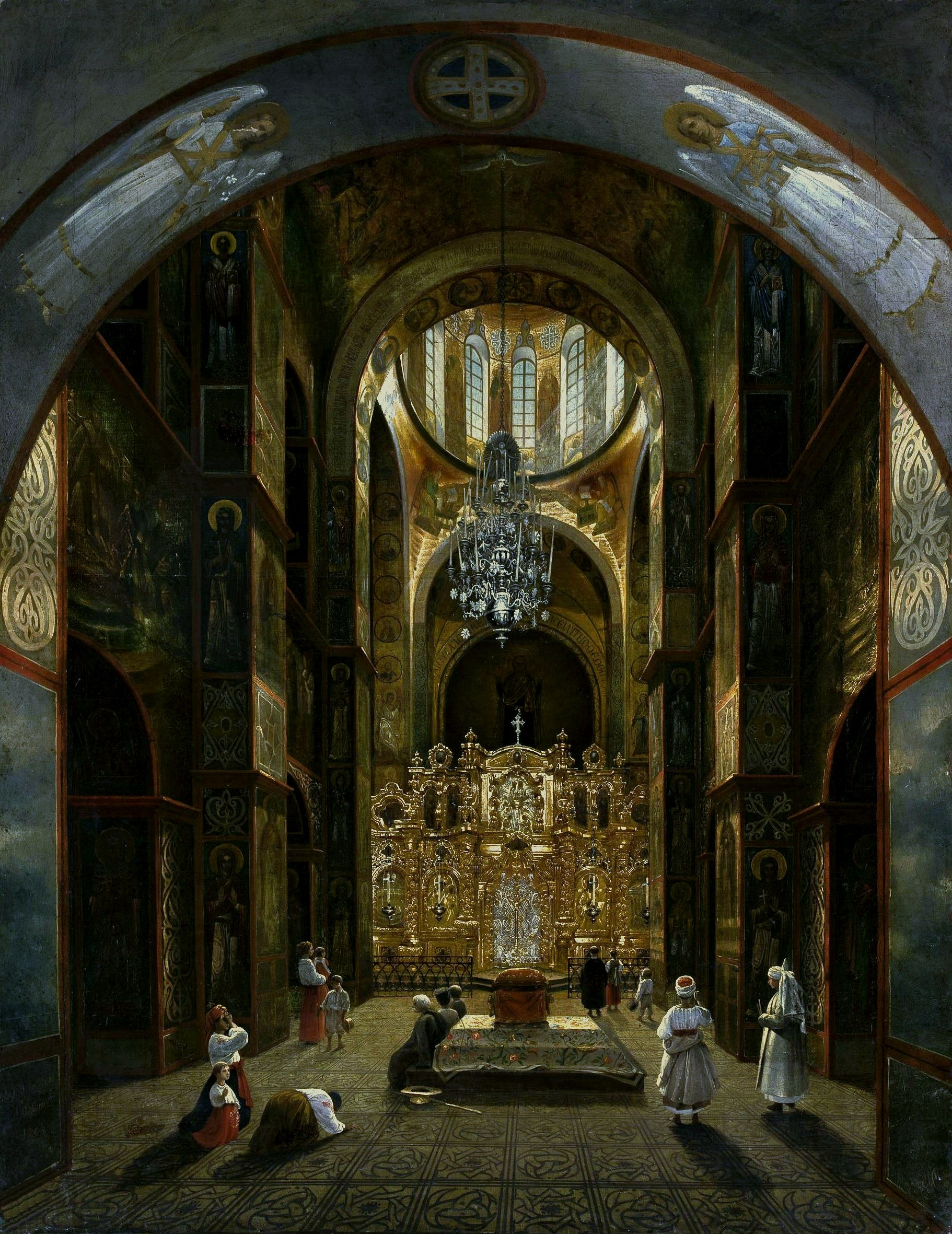
- Saint Sophia's Cathedral in Kyiv
- Born: 1818; Galich
- Died: 1885 (aged 66–67); Omsk
- Education: Imperial Academy of Arts

Mikhail Makarovich Sazhin (Russian: Михаил Макарович Сажин), born in 1818 in Galich and deceased in 1885 in Omsk, was a Russian landscape painter.

== Life ==
Sazhin studied at the Imperial Academy of Arts in Saint Petersburg from 1834 until 1840, and became a member of the academy in 1855. In 1844, he moved to Ukraine, and in Kyiv in 1846 he began working with Taras Shevchenko, whom he probably knew from Saint Petersburg.

Some of his works are kept in the Shevchenko House Museum in Kyiv where they worked together. Others are held in the National Art Museum of Ukraine, in the Russian Museum in Saint Petersburg, and in the National Museum in Warsaw. A street in Kyiv was named in his honour in 1962.

== Works ==
His works are essentially landscapes mixing the urban and rural in a picturesque perspective. They offer interesting and unexpected views of the city of Kyiv and the neighbourhood of Podil from the surrounding hills before the widespread adoption of photography.

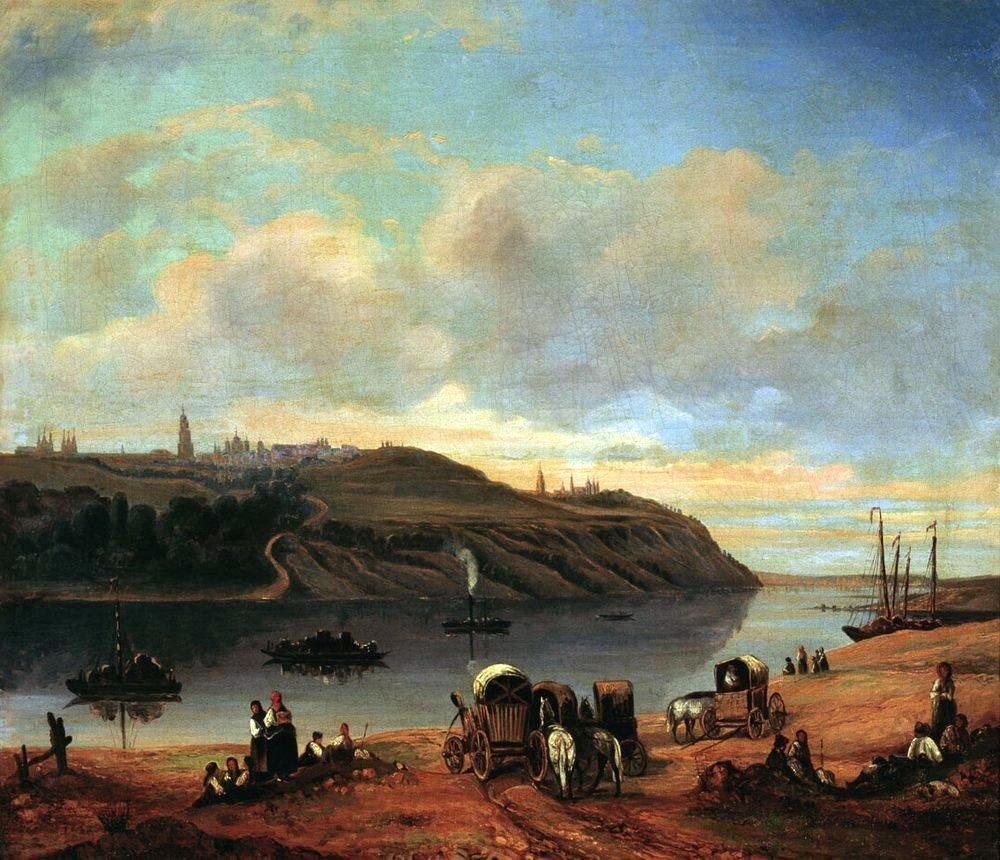
Kyiv from the Dnieper.

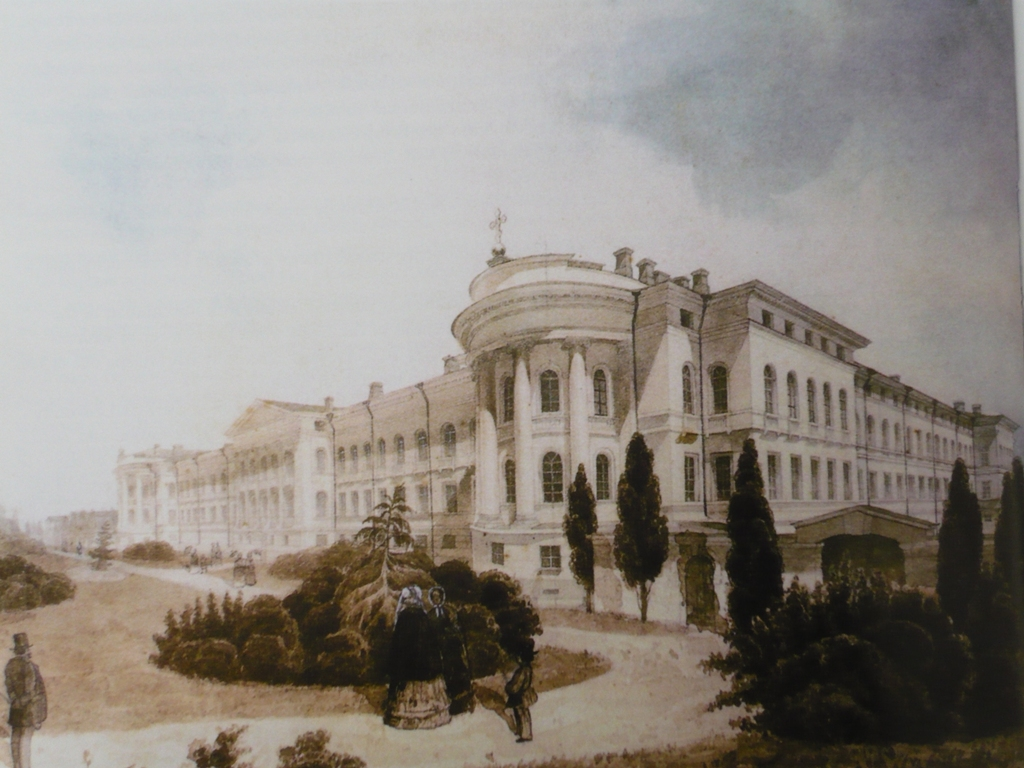
Taras Shevchenko National University of Kyiv.

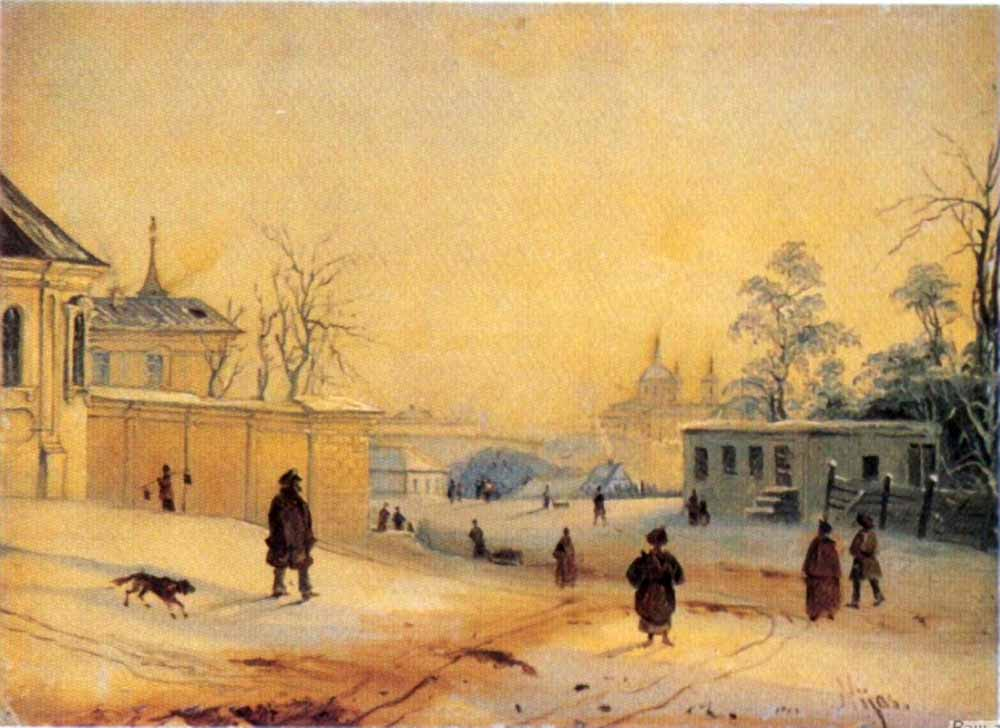
View from Saint Vladimir hill, Kyiv.

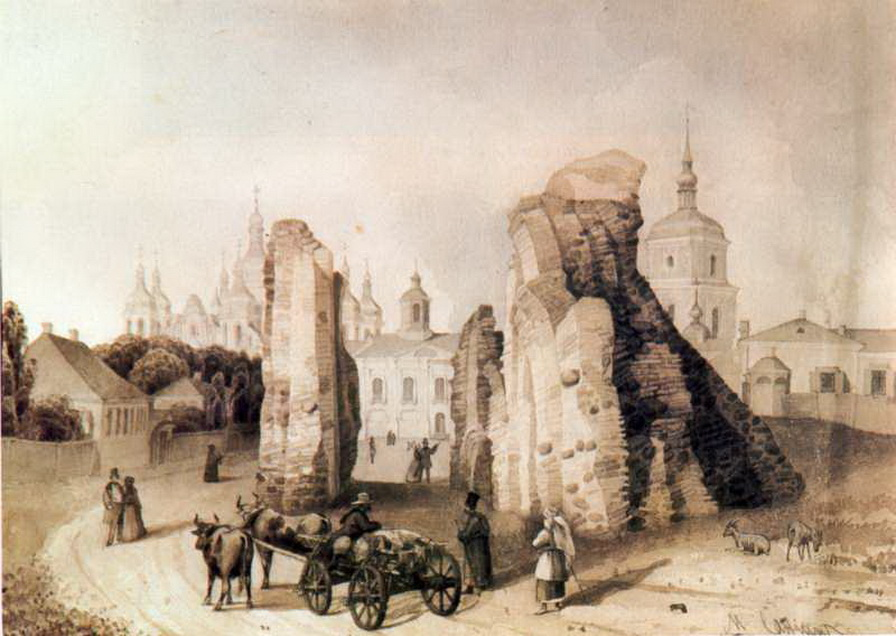
Golden Gate, Kyiv, 1846.

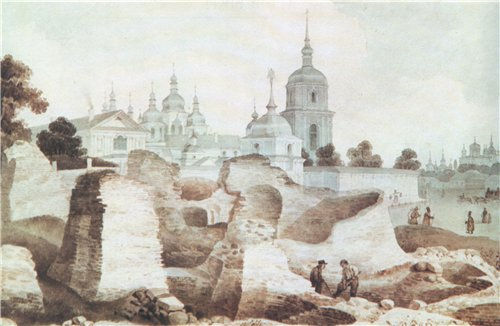
Irynynska Cathedral with Saint Sophia Cathedral, Kyiv, in the background, 1846.

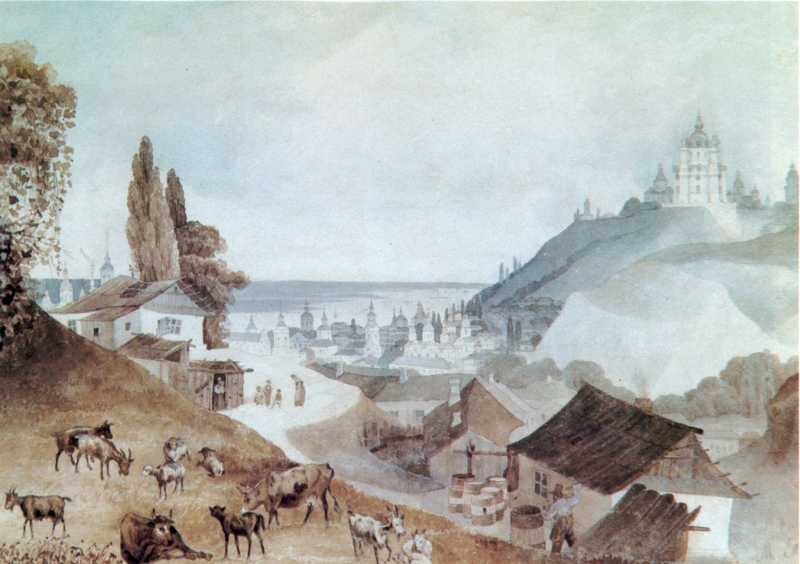
View of Podil from Shchekavitsya, Kiev.

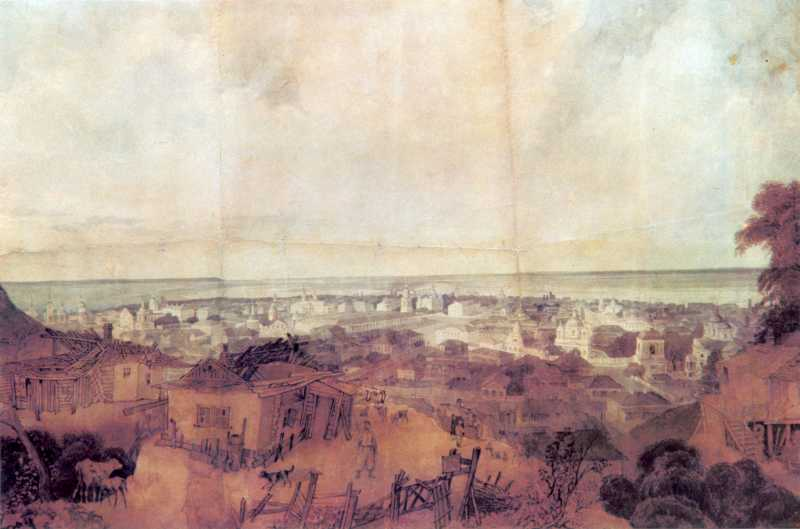
Panorama of Podil.

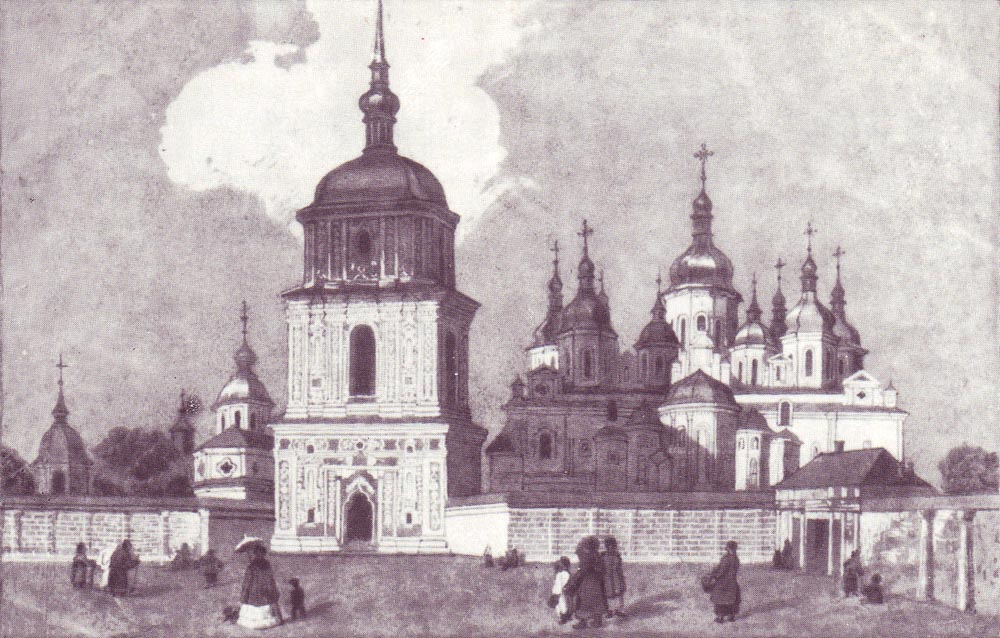
Saint Sophia Cathedral, Kyiv.

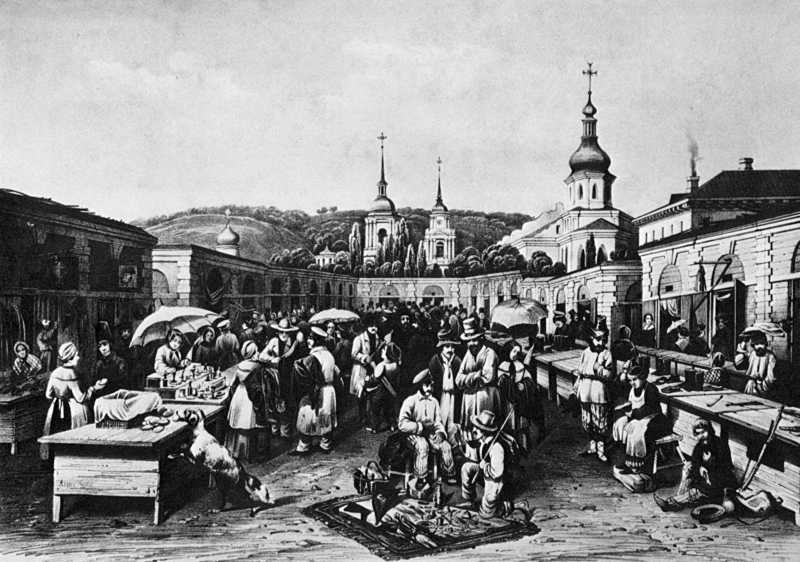
The Square of Contracts in Podil with the belltowers of the Ascension Convent in the background.

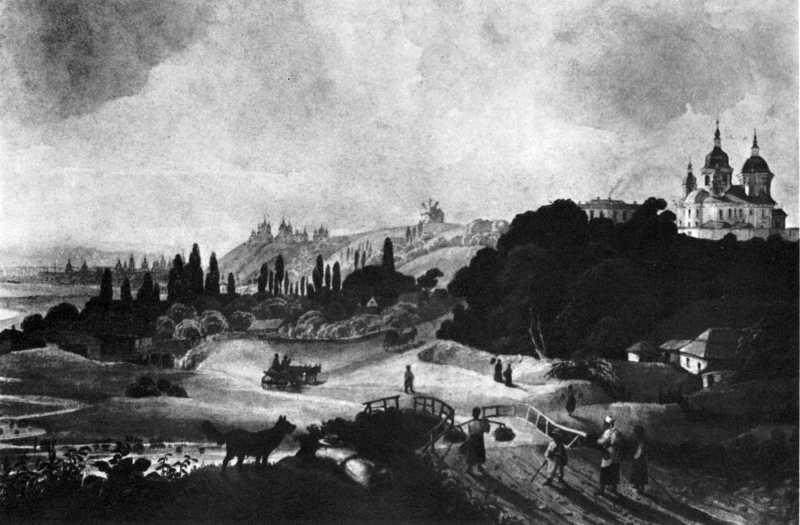
View of Kurenivka. The bell towers of St. Cyril's Monastery, Kyiv are on the right.

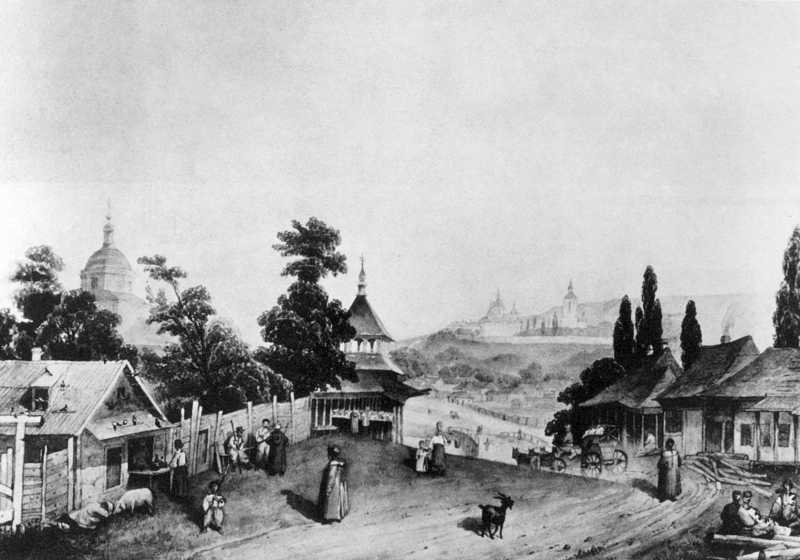
View of Kurenivka.

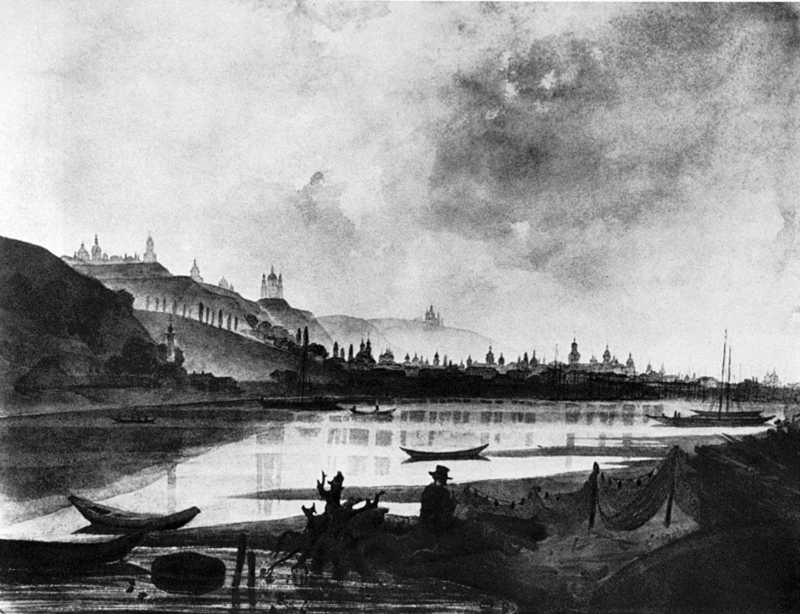
View of Kiev and Podil from the Dnieper.

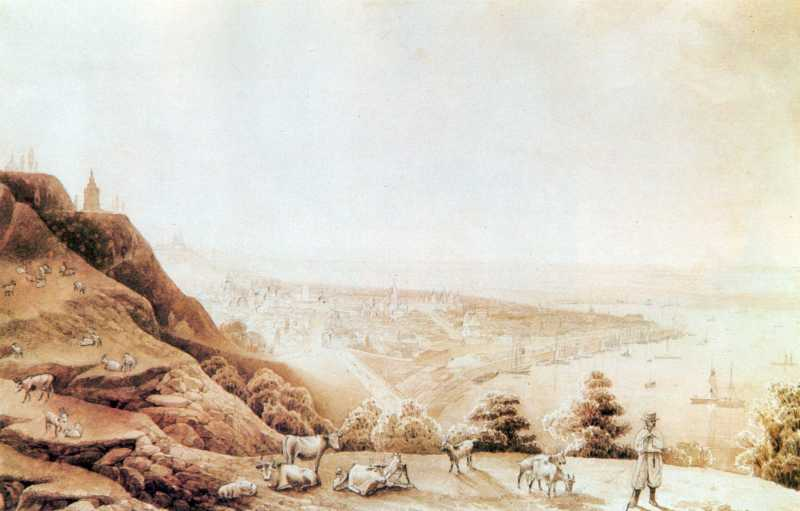
View of Podil.

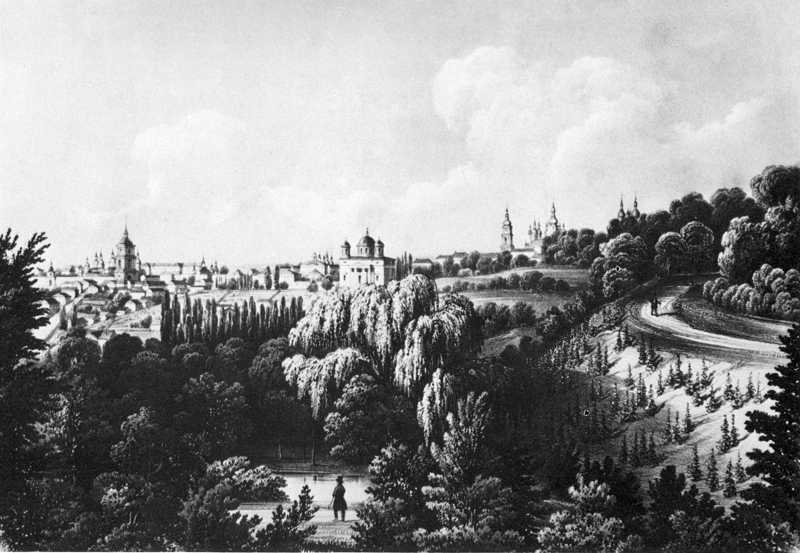
View of Kyiv from the imperial garden.

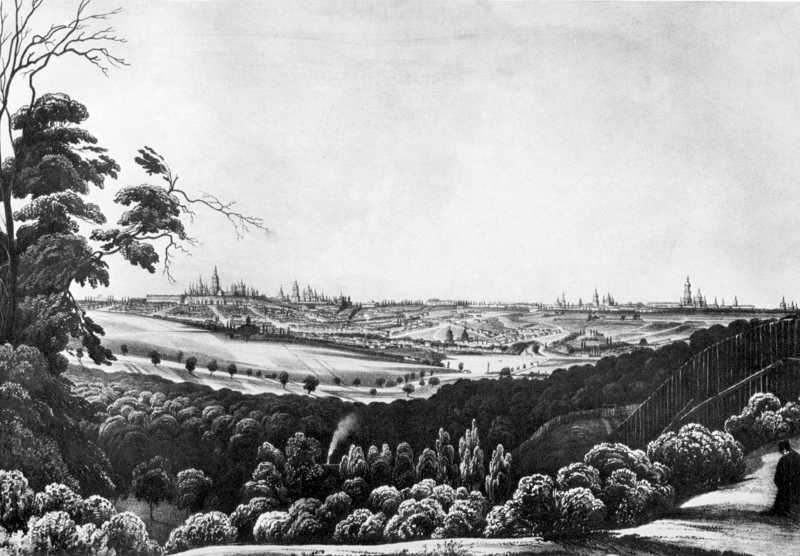
View of Kyiv.
