= Valeriia Kozlovska =

Ukrainian archaeologist and curator (1889–1956)

Valeriia Yevhenivna Kozlovska (Ukrainian: Валерія Євгенівна Козловська; 20 June 1889, Burimka, Chernigov Governorate – 6 May 1956, Utica, New York) was a Ukrainian and Soviet archaeologist and curator. Kozlovska was a member of the National Academy of Sciences of Ukraine and the Shevchenko Scientific Society.
