= Kurenivka mudslide =

Mass-casualty disaster in Kyiv, Ukrainian SSR

- Remediation works after the event
- Date: 13 March 1961; 65 years ago
- Time: 09:20 (UTC+02:00)
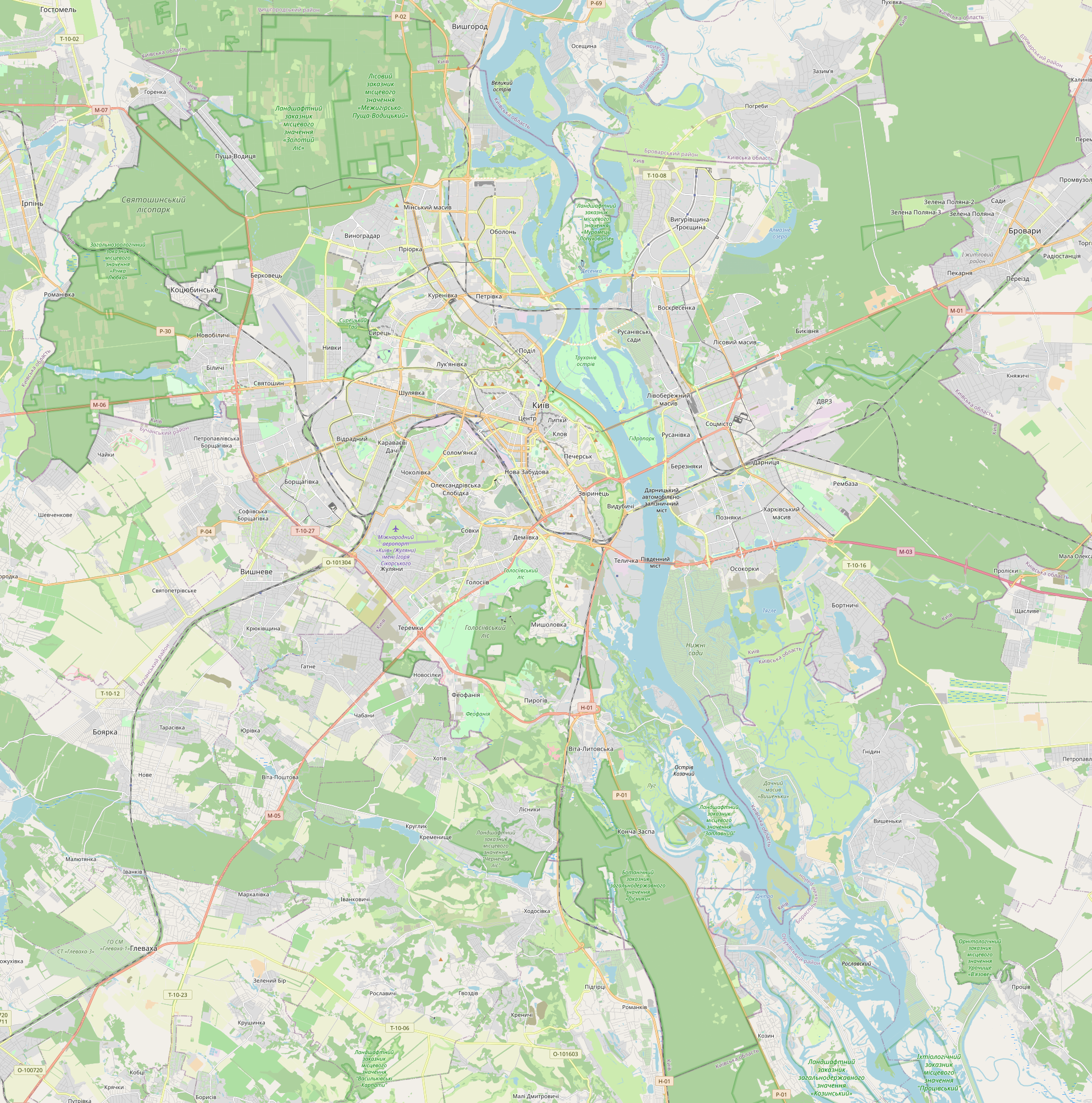
- Location: Babi Yar, Kyiv, Ukrainian SSR, Soviet Union Babi Yar (Ukraine Kyiv); 50°26′40″N 30°32′44″E
- Type: Mudflow
- Cause: Dam design flaws and poor maintenance
- Deaths: 145 (Soviet official sources), up to 1,500 (unofficial later investigations)

The Kurenivka mudslide occurred on 13 March 1961 in Kyiv, then a city in the Ukrainian SSR, Soviet Union. It took place near the historic Babi Yar ravine, which had been the site of the mass murder of more than 100,000 Jews and other civilians during World War II. The mudslide began at the edge of the ravine and dumped mud, water, and human remains into the streets of Kyiv. The Soviet authorities suppressed information about the disaster, and claimed 145 people were killed, while forbidding any memorial events for the victims. A 2012 study in Ukraine estimated that the number of victims was closer to 1,500.

== Disaster ==
The mudslide started when a dam securing the loam pulp dump of a brick factory near the Babi Yar ravine collapsed after rain, releasing large volumes of pulp sludge, mud, water, and human remains down the steep hill of the modern Olena Teliha Street and into the streets of Kyiv. The slide immediately hit the lower-lying Kurenivka neighbourhood, reaching a residential area, a tram depot, several industrial buildings and a cemetery, as well as traffic moving along the streets. The total volume of pulp in the vicinity of Kyrylivska-Novokostiantynivska streets was up to 600,000 cubic metres (21,000,000 cu ft) with a depth of up to 4 metres (13 ft). While the contemporaneous official report indicated only 145 fatalities, a more recent study estimated that about 1,500 people died in the tragedy.

== Recovery operations ==
Recovery operations continued for days, but no official notification of the disaster was published by the Soviet authorities.

Recovery operations were led by the 120 Detached Engineering Battalion and the Anti-gas Regiment of the Local Anti-Aircraft Defence troops of the Soviet Army in the Kyiv Military District, led by Ivan Kharchenko, a Hero of the Soviet Union. The events were censored by the Soviet Government. To cover up the scale of the disaster, people who died were buried in different cemeteries in the city and nearby towns, with different dates and reasons for their deaths written in government records. Any acts of public remembrance were prohibited, and Soviet troops were sent to Kyiv to clean up signs of the catastrophe.

== Aftermath ==
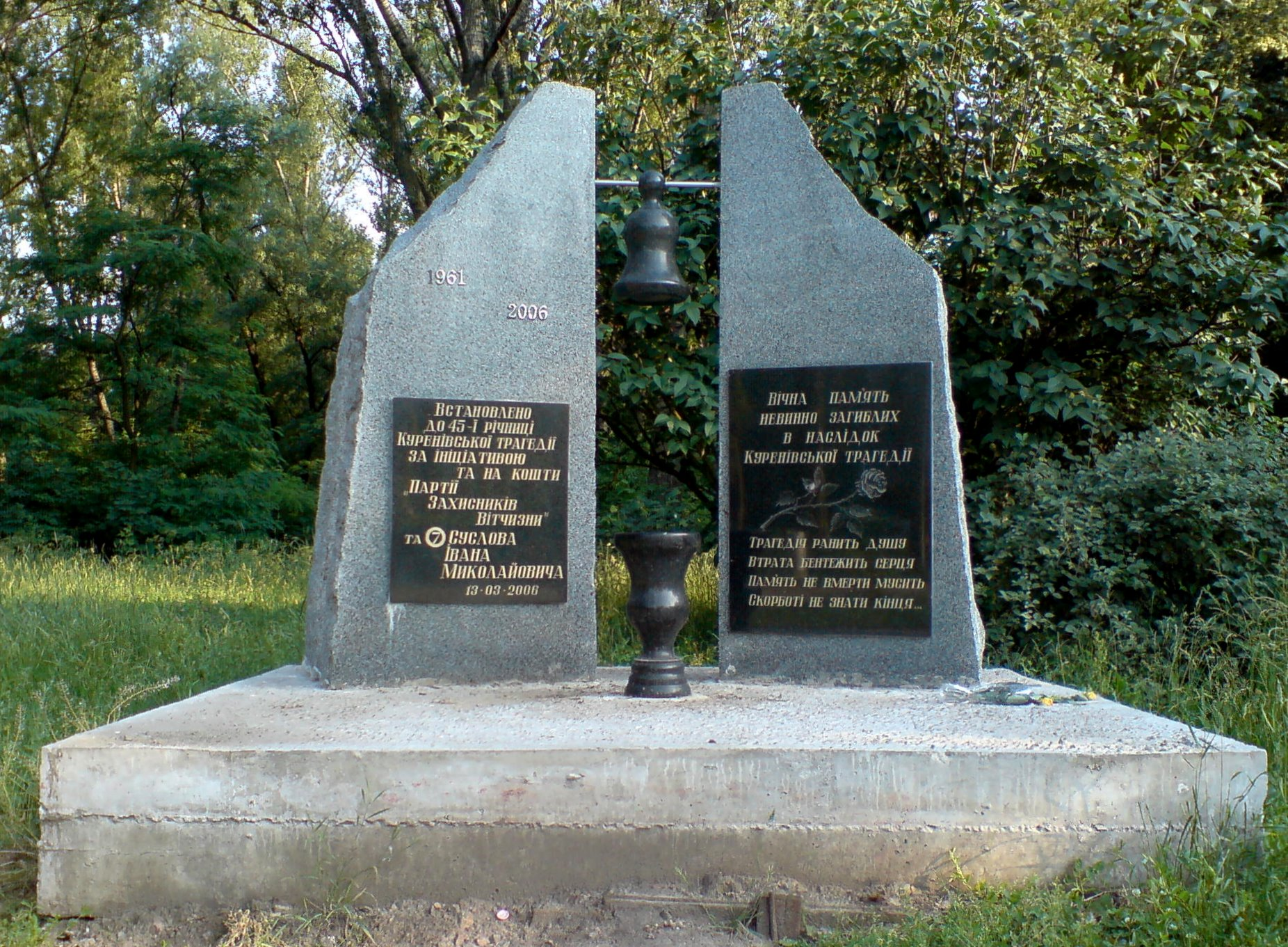
Kyiv Kurenivka Mudslide Monument

Construction engineers and managers responsible for the dam's design and maintenance were accused of negligence by the authorities, and subsequently convicted.

In 1962 Ukrainian Communist Party leaders ordered the leveling of the Babi Yar ravine and the establishment of a park on the site where at least 33,000 Jews from Kyiv and the surrounding area had been murdered in 1941 by the Einsatzgruppen.

== See also ==
- History of Kyiv

== Sources ==
- Harran, Marilyn, ed. (2000). "Epilogue: The Aftermath". The Holocaust Chronicle (1st ed.). Publications International. pp. 655–698. ISBN 978-0785329633.
- Smoliy, V. A.; Goryak, G. V.; Danilenko, V. M. (2012). Куренівська трагедія 13 березня 1961 р. у Києві: причини, обставини, наслідки. Документи і матеріали [Kurenivka Tragedy March 13, 1961 in Kiev: Causes, Circumstances, Consequences. Documents and materials] (in Ukrainian). Institute of Ukrainian History NAN Ukraine. p. 18. ISBN 978-966-02-6392-5.

=== Further reading ===
- Dzhulay, Dmytro (16 March 2021). "Babyn Yar's 'Revenge'? The Deadly Mudslide The KGB Tried To Cover Up". Radio Free Europe/Radio Liberty.
