= Pochaina railway station =

Railway station in Kyiv, Ukraine

Pochaina railway station Станция Почайна
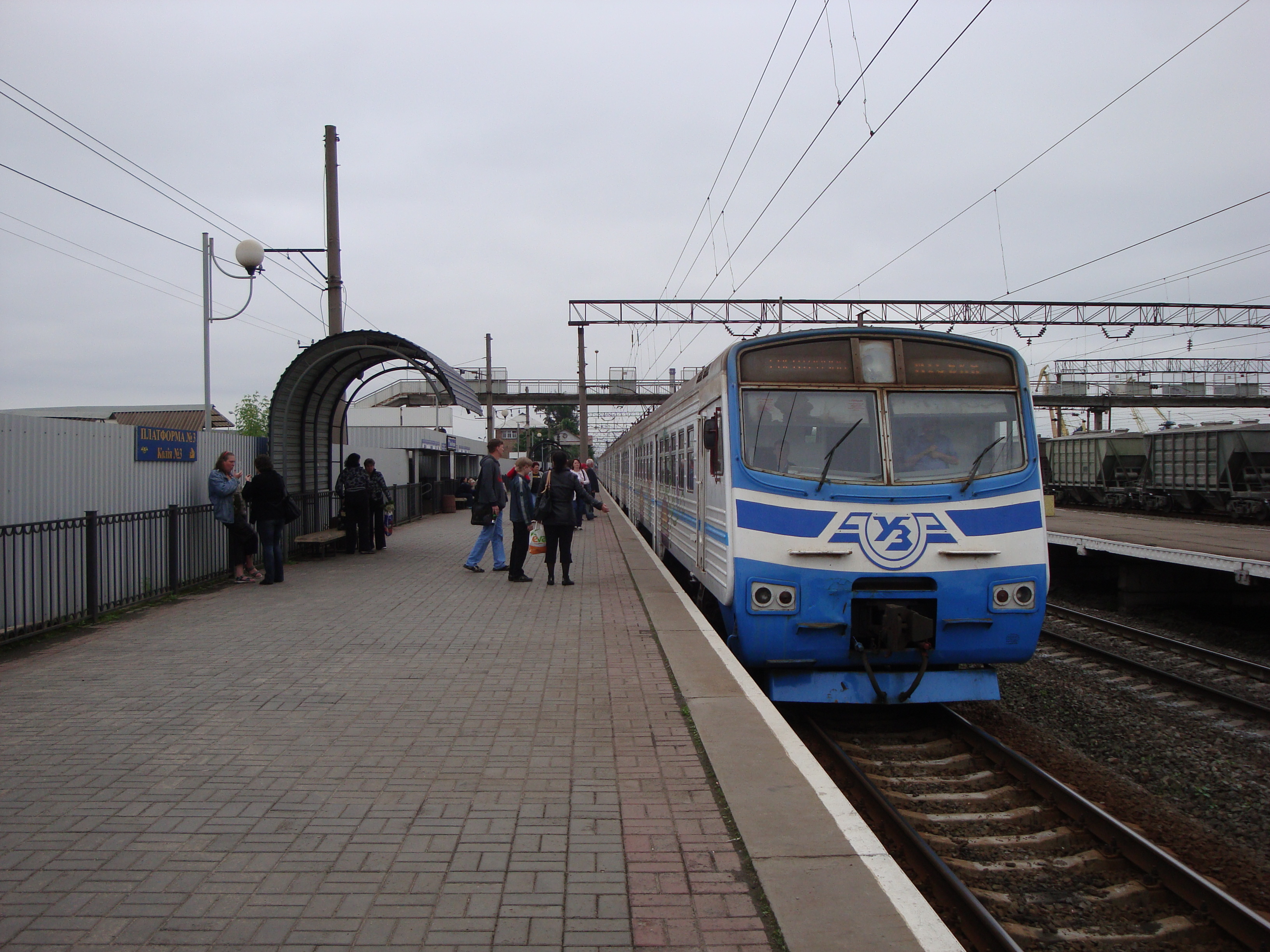

General information
- Location: Ukraine
- Coordinates: 50.484916701485304°N 30.499212441802573°E
- Train operators: Kyiv Urban Electric Train
- Bus routes: Kiev bus routes: 21, 50, 101 Kyiv Trolleybus routes: 25, 27, 29, 30, 31, 34 Kyiv fixed-route taxi routes: 150, 151, 157, 183, 192, 234, 242, 410, 421, 463, 525, 550, 598Д
- Connections: Pochaina (Kyiv Metro)

History
- Opened: November 5, 1927

Services
Preceding station	Ukrainian Railways	Following station
Kurenivka toward Darnytsia	Kyiv City Express	Obolon toward Darnytsia
- Media related to Pochaina Railway Station at Wikimedia Commons
Location

Pochaina railway station is a train station in the Petrivka neighborhood of Kyiv, next to the Dnieper River, on the Kyiv Urban Electric Train Line. The railway station is an aboveground train station and rail yard within walking distance of the underground Pochaina metro station for connecting services on the Obolonsko–Teremkivska line. Pochaina and its adjacent metro station are named after the ancient and almost-mythical Pochaina River, the location of the historical Baptism of Kyiv.

Pochaina was formerly called the Petrivka railway station, named after Grigory Petrovsky, a key figure in the Communist politics of the Ukrainian Soviet Socialist Republic. On March 27, 2018, the Kyiv City Council changed the name of Petrivka Station to Pochaina Station. The Council is currently engaged in a practice of renaming metro and train stations, city roads, and other forms of infrastructure that were previously named after Communist figures. The railway bridge from Pochaina station to Troyeshchyna station was also recently renamed "Rybalsky railway bridge."
