= Shevchenko Square (Lubny) =

Park in Lubny, Ukraine

Coordinates: 50°01′06.8″N 32°59′23.9″E

Taras Shevchenko Square (Ukrainian: Сквер імені Тараса Шевченка) is a Lubny city square park.

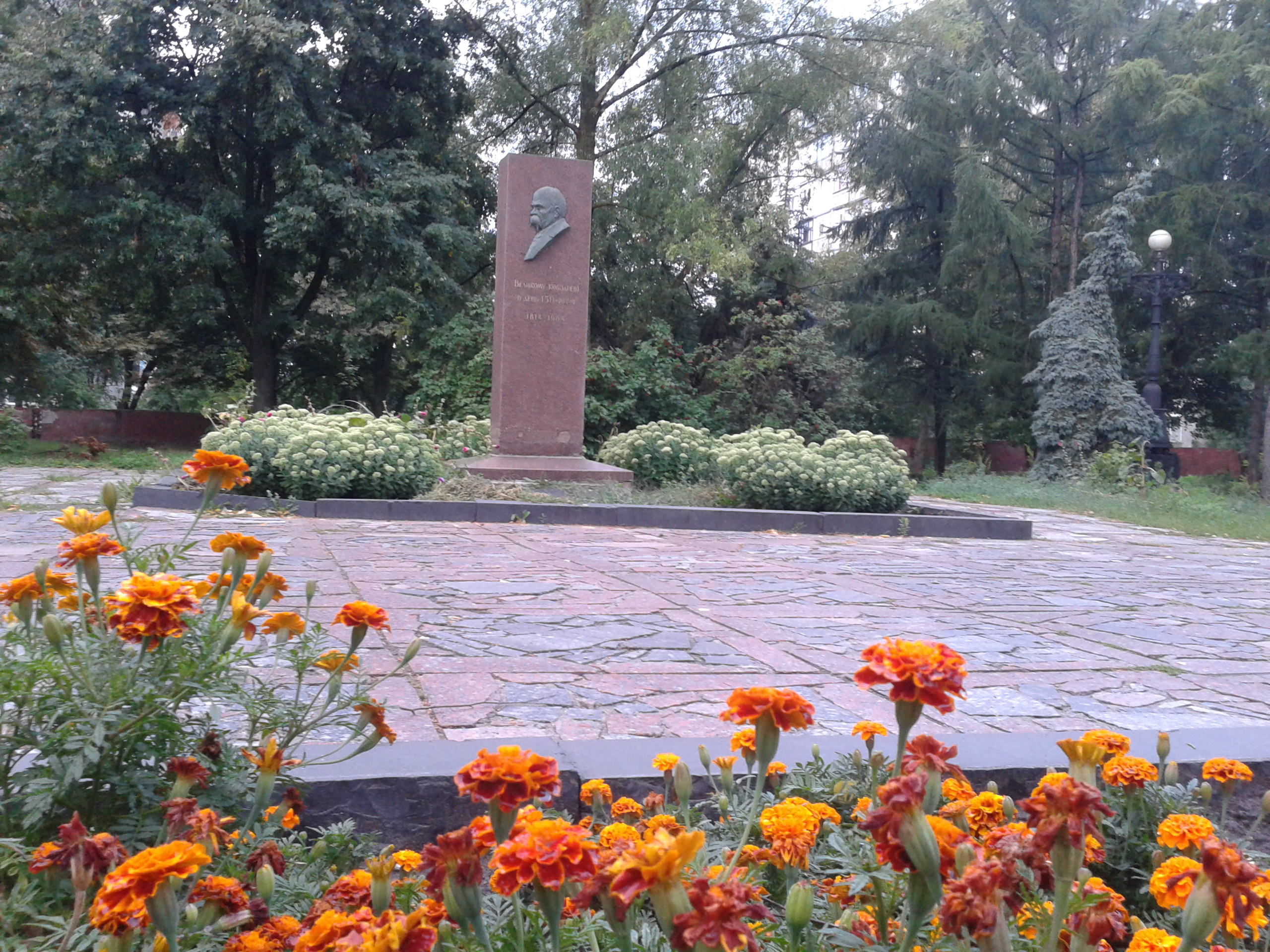
Monument

Note, in Ukraine as in the rest of the Eastern Europe a term "square" carries a meaning of small urban park (square park), rather than a fully paved urban square.
