= Kurenivka =

Historical neighbourhood in Kyiv

Coordinates: 50°29′35″N 30°26′41″E

Kurenivka (Ukrainian: Куренівка) is a historical neighbourhood in Kyiv, the capital of Ukraine. It is located between the neighbourhoods of Podil, Obolon, Priorka, and Syrets.

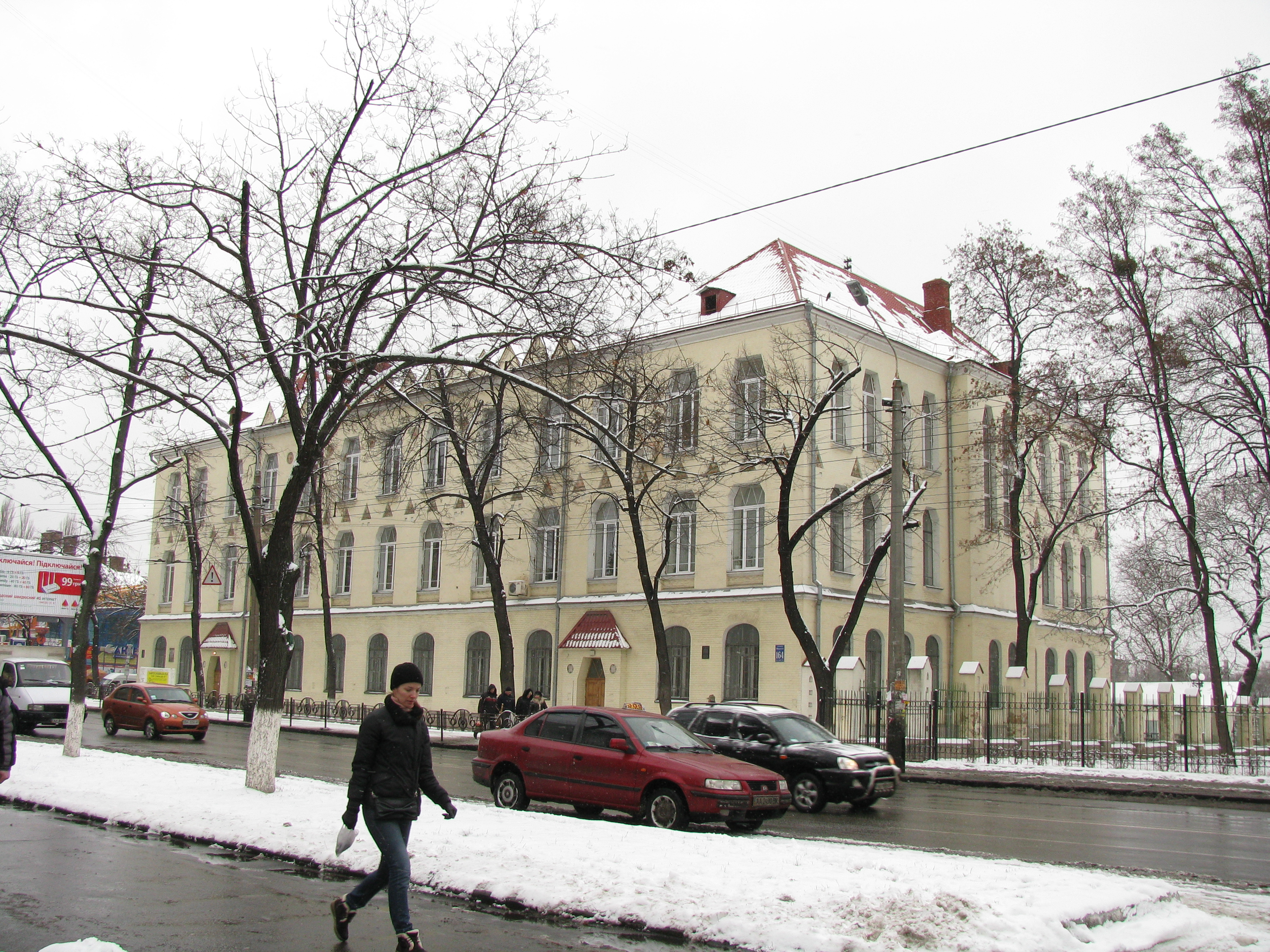
Hrushevskyi College in Kurenivka

== History ==
Kurenivka has been known since the 17th century as a suburb of the city of Kyiv. Here were located several kurins of the Kyiv Cossack Kosh. Some historians attribute the origin of the name with these Cossack camps, with kurin meaning Cossack caps. Later the suburb became a cottage settlement. With Kyiv's expansion through the centuries, Kurenivka was slowly populated. These inhabitants bought out land, and created their gardens. This had made the area more like a neighbourhood, serving Kyiv with various grocery products.

In 1961, the mudslide from upper-located neighborhood hit Kurenivka, resulting in 145 fatalities according to official government reports.

During the Battle of Kyiv of 2022 Russian invasion of Ukraine, Kurenivka was hit by a missile, killing one person, injuring 6 and damaging nearby buildings.
