= Mykola Porovskyi =

Ukrainian colonel and politician

- Микола Поровський
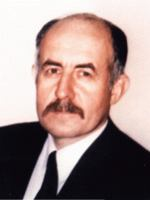
- Official portrait, 2005

People's Deputy of Ukraine
- In office August 2005 – 25 May 2006
- Constituency: Our Ukraine Bloc, No. 98
- In office 15 May 1990 – 29 March 1998
- Preceded by: Position established
- Succeeded by: Constituency abolished
- Constituency: Rivne Oblast, Rivne Raion

Personal details
- Born: 20 June 1956 (age 70) Zaritsk, Ukrainian SSR, Soviet Union (now Ukraine)
- Party: Republican Christian Party (since 1997)
- Other political affiliations: Communist Party of the Soviet Union (before 1989); People's Movement of Ukraine (1989–1993); Democratic Bloc (1990–1991); Congress of National-Democratic Forces; Ukrainian Republican Party (1994–1997); Our Ukraine Bloc (2002–2005); Revival (2005–2006)
- Education: National University of Water and Environmental Engineering; National Academy for Public Administration

Military service
- Allegiance: Ukraine
- Years of service: 1991–2016
- Rank: Colonel
- Unit: 44th Artillery Brigade; 3rd Separate Special Purpose Regiment
- Battles/wars: Russo-Ukrainian War; War in Donbas

Mykola Ivanovych Porovskyi (Ukrainian: Микола Іванович Поровський; born 20 June 1956) is a Ukrainian colonel and politician who served as a People's Deputy of Ukraine from Rivne Oblast between 1990 and 1998, and later from 2005 to 2006 on the proportional list of the Our Ukraine Bloc. Porovskyi was a founding member of the People's Movement of Ukraine, co-founded the Armed Forces of Ukraine and carried the flag of Ukraine into the Verkhovna Rada building following the adoption of the Declaration of Independence of Ukraine in 1991.

== Early life and career ==
Mykola Ivanovych Porovskyi was born 20 June 1956 in the village of Zaritsk in Ukraine's western Rivne Oblast, which was then part of the Soviet Union. His father, Ivan Yevhenovych Porovskyi, and his mother, Nadiia Ivanivna Porovska, were both ethnic Ukrainians. Mykola's great-great-grandfather, Leon Pokrovskyi, had joined the 1863 January Uprising against the Russian Empire, dying during the uprising. His grandfather, Yevhen, was a veteran of the Ukrainian People's Army and his father fought in the Ukrainian Insurgent Army. He studied at the National University of Water and Environmental Engineering, graduating in 1979 with a specialisation in water engineering. Throughout the 1980s, he worked at several state-owned construction companies throughout western Ukraine. He also joined the Komsomol in 1984.

== Political career ==
Porovskyi joined the People's Movement of Ukraine (Ukrainian: Народний рух України, romanized: Narodnyi rukh Ukrainy; abbreviated Rukh) upon its founding in 1989; he was chairman of the Rivne Regional Organisation of Rukh, as well as chairman of the organising committee for the organisation's First Convention. He had previously been a member of the Communist Party of the Soviet Union. He participated in the 1989–1991 Ukrainian revolution, raising the flag of Ukraine at the Battlefield of Berestechko National Historic Memorial Preserve. In the 1990 Ukrainian Supreme Soviet election, he was elected to the Supreme Soviet of the Ukrainian Soviet Socialist Republic (later the Verkhovna Rada) from the Democratic Bloc, representing Rivne Raion.

Following the January Events, in which the Soviet Army attempted to invade Lithuania to stop it from becoming independent, Porovskyi was among those placed in charge of creating an Armed Forces of Ukraine independent from the Soviet Union, alongside Viacheslav Chornovil, Ihor Derkach, Vitalii Lazorkin and Vilen Martyrosian. Porovskyi was tasked by Ihor Yukhnovskyi, leader of the Democratic Bloc, with negotiating with pro-sovereignty communists (known as the Group of 239) in order to bring them to support the Declaration of Independence of Ukraine. As a result of Porovskyi's negotiations, the Democratic Bloc agreed to prevent lustration of communist officials, persecution of communists or dismantlement of the in exchange for voting in favour of independence. Following this, Porovskyi exited the Verkhovna Rada building for Sophia Square, where alongside Dmytro Pavlychko he informed people that Ukraine had become independent. Porovskyi was one of the three People's Deputies that carried the flag of Ukraine into the Verkhovna Rada building, alongside Chornovil and Ivan Zaiets.

The Democratic Bloc dissolved after Ukraine became independent, and Porovskyi was first part of the faction of Rukh before later joining the Congress of National-Democratic Forces. He was re-elected in the 1994 Ukrainian parliamentary election from Rivne Raion as a member of the Ukrainian Republican Party. He remained a member of the Verkhovna Rada Defence and Security Committee from 1990 until 1998. During the funeral of Patriarch Volodymyr of Kyiv, Porovskyi, along with former president Leonid Kravchuk, led the Patriarch's funeral procession. According to Prime Minister Yevhen Marchuk, they made the decision to travel to Sophia Square rather than Baikove Cemetery for the burial, which sparked a violent response from the Berkut riot police and followers of the Ukrainian Orthodox Church (Moscow Patriarchate).

Porovskyi was a candidate for People's Deputy from Ukraine's 154th electoral district in the 1998 Ukrainian parliamentary election, when he was defeated by Vitalii Tsekhmistrenko. He was the 98th candidate on the proportional list of the Our Ukraine Bloc in the 2002 Ukrainian parliamentary election. Though he was not initially elected, he became a People's Deputy upon the resignation of other proportional-list deputies in August 2005. He left the Our Ukraine Bloc the same month, joining the Revival party in December of that year.

Since leaving office, Porovskyi has unsuccessfully attempted several campaigns to return to the Verkhovna Rada. He ran in the 2006 Ukrainian parliamentary election as a candidate for Revival, followed by a candidacy under the Election Bloc Liudmyla Suprun – Ukrainian Regional Asset in the 2007 Ukrainian parliamentary election. He attempted to run for the 152nd electoral district in the 2012 Ukrainian parliamentary election, but was again unsuccessful, losing to Oleh Osukhovskyi of Svoboda.

== Personal life ==
Porovskyi is married. He is a member of the Higher Church Council of the Ukrainian Greek Catholic Church.

Following the beginning of the War in Donbas in 2014, Porovskyi volunteered to leave the reserves for active duty. He served in the 44th Artillery Brigade and the 3rd Separate Special Purpose Regiment before being mandated to retire at the age of 60 in 2016. During his military service, he reached the rank of colonel.
