= Vilen Martyrosian =

Ukrainian lieutenant general and politician (1940–2023)

Merited Social Worker Vilen Martyrosian
- Вілен Мартиросян

People's Deputy of the Soviet Union
- In office 1989–1991
- Preceded by: Position established
- Succeeded by: Position abolished

Personal details
- Born: 22 September 1940 Kirovabad, Azerbaijani SSR, Soviet Union (now Ganja, Azerbaijan)
- Died: 19 July 2023 (aged 82) Kyiv, Ukraine
- Resting place: Baikove Cemetery, Kyiv
- Party: Independent (until 1989); People's Movement of Ukraine (1989–1991); Motherland (from 1996)
- Education: Kyiv Suvorov Military School

Military service
- Allegiance: Soviet Union; Ukraine
- Branch/service: Soviet Army; Ukrainian Ground Forces
- Rank: Colonel (Soviet Union); Lieutenant general (Ukraine)
- Commands: 55th Signal Regiment; 13th Army

Vilen Arutiunovych Martyrosian (Ukrainian: Вілен Арутюнович Мартиросян; Armenian: Վիլեն Հարությունի Մարտիրոսյան, romanized: Vilen Harutyuni Martirosyan; 22 September 1940 – 19 July 2023) was an Azerbaijani-born Ukrainian lieutenant general and politician who was a People's Deputy of the Soviet Union from 1989 to 1991. Martyrosian was a member of the People's Movement of Ukraine (Rukh) and its deputy chairman from 1989 to 1991. He was one of the founders of the Armed Forces of Ukraine.

== Early life and career ==
Vilen Harutyuni Martirosyan was born on 22 September 1940 in Ganja, Azerbaijan to an ethnically-Armenian family. He served in the Soviet Army from 1963, studying at Kyiv Suvorov Military School. He served in the Transcaucasian Military District from 1963 to 1968 before becoming a battalion commander in 1972. He steadily rose through the ranks in the Transbaikal Military District between 1972 and 1985. Martyrosian began serving in the Carpathian Military District in 1985, commanding a signal regiment based in Rivne.

== Political career ==
Martyrosian joined the Rivne city council in 1987, serving on the body for a year. He was elected as a People's Deputy of the Soviet Union in the 1989 Soviet Union legislative election, representing Rivne Oblast as an independent. Martyrosian's candidacy faced staunch opposition from the local communist government, which attempted to prevent him from registering and waged a disinformation campaign against him. Martyrosian was sympathetic to the People's Movement of Ukraine (Ukrainian: Народний рух України, romanized: Narodnyi rukh Ukrainy; abbreviated Rukh), and served as deputy chairman of the organisation from 1989 to 1991. Martyrosian was also closely connected with feminist groups, and during a feminist rally on 17 March 1991 he voiced his opposition to the 1991 Soviet Union referendum.

=== Foundation of the Armed Forces of Ukraine ===
Following the 1991 January Events, in which the Soviet Army attempted to invade Lithuania to prevent it from achieving independence. Though the effort was unsuccessful, and no Ukrainian soldiers were involved, it sparked alarm among Ukraine's opposition that Ukrainian soldiers could potentially be used in a future conflict. This led Viacheslav Chornovil, the de facto leader of the Ukrainian anti-Soviet movement, to establish the Military Collegium of Rukh, comprising himself, Martyrosian, Ihor Derkach, Vitalii Lazorkin and Mykola Porovskyi. As a military commander noted for his public statements defending democracy, Martyrosian was particularly important to this group. The Union of Officers of Ukraine (UOU) was established under Martyrosian's leadership as the Military Collegium prepared to establish the Armed Forces of Ukraine. This right was guaranteed under the Declaration of State Sovereignty of Ukraine, and a convention of 300 UOU members assembled in Kyiv from 27–28 July 1991 to demand that all military forces in Ukraine (including internal troops and militsiya) be de-politicised and placed under the jurisdiction of the Ukrainian government.

During the 1991 Soviet coup attempt, Martyrosian refused orders to enforce the coup and declared that the 55th Signal Regiment and the 13th Army were now loyal to Ukraine. Along with the soldiers of the 55th Regiment, he travelled to Kyiv with the intention of defending the Supreme Soviet (now the Verkhovna Rada) from two armed divisions that were believed to have expressed support for the putschist State Committee on the State of Emergency. Martyrosian's regiment received support from Russian president Boris Yeltsin and Konstantin Kobets, who supported him.

=== Later life and death ===
Martyrosian and the UOU became one of the largest non-government bodies in Ukraine by November 1991. At this time, 15% of all serving officers were UOU members, while an additional 40% sympathised with it. Martyrosian founded the Motherland party in 1996 as effectively a lobbying group for officers' interests in Ukrainian politics. It was one of several social organisations for Ukrainian military officers that came into existence during the mid-1990s.

Martyrosian continued to advise the Ukrainian government on military affairs from 1992 to April 2005. He was awarded the title of Merited Social Worker of Ukraine in 2004. He died on 19 July 2023 and was buried in Baikove Cemetery.
