= Vasyl Kozak =

Ukrainian soldier

- Василь Козак
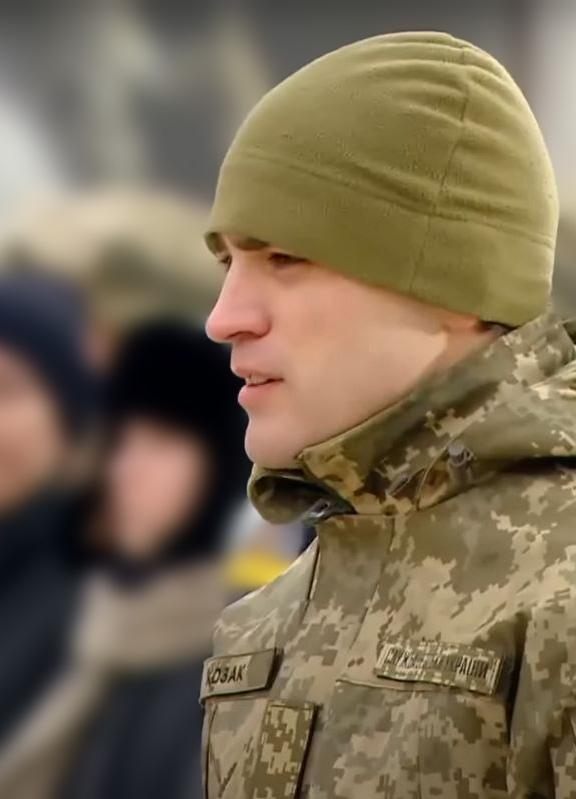

Personal details
- Born: 1993 (age 32–33) Yavoriv Raion, Lviv Oblast, Ukraine
- Awards: Hero of Ukraine

Military service
- Allegiance: Ukraine
- Rank: Colonel
- Commands: Security Service of Ukraine
- Battles/wars: Russian invasion of Ukraine

Vasyl Mykhailovych Kozak (Ukrainian: Василь Михайлович Козак; born 1993 in Lviv, Ukraine) is a Ukrainian national recognized as a Hero of Ukraine.

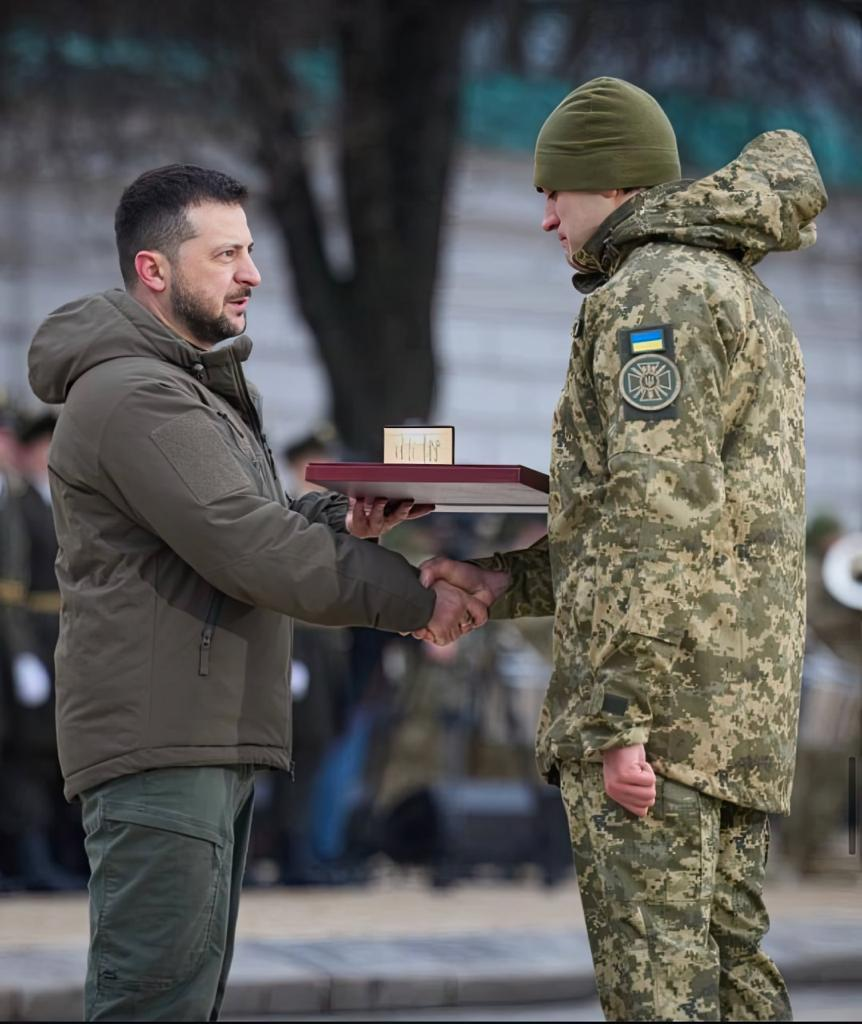
Kozak receiving the Hero of Ukraine award from President Volodymyr Zelenskyy at Sophia Square, Kyiv, on February 24, 2023.

== Early life and education ==
Kozak completed his secondary education at Lviv Gymnasium "Prestige". He is an accomplished karate practitioner, a member of the UNION sports karate club, and trained under the honored trainer of Ukraine, Anton Nikulin. Kozak has achieved significant success in karate, becoming the champion of Ukraine and a laureate of the European Cup.

Kozak pursued higher education at the Yaroslav Mudryi National Law University, where he graduated in 2015. In 2017, he became a postgraduate student in the Department of Criminal Law and defended his dissertation for the degree of Doctor of Philosophy in June 2021. His dissertation focused on "Criminal liability for illegal trafficking of vehicles".

== Career ==
Kozak worked at the Security Service of Ukraine (SSU) office in Uzhhorod, where he led the Department for Combating Corruption and Organized Crime. During his tenure, significant quantities of heroin smuggled into the European Union were intercepted in the Zakarpattia region. His efforts led to the conviction and imprisonment of numerous criminals involved in organized crime.

Kozak played a crucial role in combating underworld figures and criminal organizations, including a Russian criminal group operating in Zakarpattia. Following the Russian invasion of Ukraine in 2022, Kozak participated in multiple successful operations in territories occupied by Russian forces.

== Awards ==
- Hero of Ukraine with the "Golden Star" order, awarded for personal courage and heroism in defending the sovereignty and territorial integrity of Ukraine. President Volodymyr Zelenskyy presented the award on February 24, 2023.
- Awarded firearm.
