= Ihor Derkach =

Ukrainian politician and activist

- Ігор Деркач
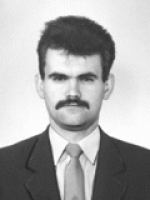
- Official portrait, 1990

People's Deputy of Ukraine
- In office 15 May 1990 – 10 May 1994
- Preceded by: Position established
- Succeeded by: Taras Protseviat
- Constituency: Lviv Oblast, Sambir

Personal details
- Born: 5 September 1963 (age 63) Solonka, Ukrainian SSR, Soviet Union (now Ukraine)
- Party: Christian-Democratic Party of Ukraine (1991–1995)
- Other political affiliations: Ukrainian Helsinki Union (1988–1990); Ukrainian Republican Party (1990–1993); Democratic Bloc
- Education: Lviv Polytechnic; Taras Shevchenko University of Kyiv

Ihor Stepanovych Derkach (Ukrainian: Ігор Степанович Деркач; born 5 September 1963) is a Ukrainian politician and activist who served as a People's Deputy of Ukraine from 1990 to 1994, representing the city of Sambir as a member of the Christian-Democratic Party of Ukraine. He was one of the founders of the Armed Forces of Ukraine, and was leader of the Ukrainian Youth Association in Ukraine during the 1989–1991 Ukrainian revolution.

== Early life and career ==
Ihor Stepanovych Derkach was born on 5 September 1963 in the village of Solonka, which was then under the Soviet Union, to an ethnically-Ukrainian family. He studied mechanical engineering at Lviv Polytechnic from 1980 to 1985 and at the legal faculty of the Taras Shevchenko University of Kyiv from 1993 to 1998. According to the Verkhovna Rada (Ukrainian parliament), he was an engineer employed at the Heorhii Karpenko Physical and Mechanical Institute from 1985.

== Political career ==
Derkach joined the Ukrainian Helsinki Union in August 1988, and was the first leader of the Ukrainian Youth Association within Ukraine, founding the group's Ukrainian chapter on 19 August 1989. Prior to and during the 1989–1991 Ukrainian revolution, Derkach organised several events, including a 29 October 1989 celebration of the West Ukrainian People's Republic's anniversary and a 10 December 1988 celebration of the Universal Declaration of Human Rights that led to his arrest by Soviet police. Derkach stood in the 1990 Ukrainian Supreme Soviet election as a candidate for the Democratic Bloc in the western Ukrainian city of Sambir. He was elected in the first round of voting on 4 March, with soldiers from the Carpathian Military District playing a significant role in his election (35% of soldiers voted for Derkach).

In the Supreme Soviet (later the Verkhovna Rada), Derkach was a member of the Defence and Security Committee. He was part of the Military Collegium of the People's Movement of Ukraine alongside Viacheslav Chornovil, Mykola Porovskyi, Vitalii Lazorkin and Vilen Martyrosian, which was responsible for creating an independent Armed Forces of Ukraine following the January Events, during which time the Soviet Army invaded Lithuania in an attempt to prevent it from becoming independent.

Derkach also investigated a series of bombings of monuments to Stepan Bandera, Yevhen Konovalets and the Galicia Division of the Schutzstaffel between December 1990 and June 1991. Derkach claimed that they had been orchestrated by the Soviet Alpha Group, which had previously been involved in the January 1991 Soviet invasion of Lithuania. He further revealed that a hand grenade had been thrown into the Ivano-Frankivsk city council building as retaliation for the demolition of the monument to Vladimir Lenin, with the organiser of the attack claiming to be a member of the Russian far-right group Pamyat.

Derkach joined the Christian-Democratic Party of Ukraine in December 1991, serving as chairman of its Kyiv Oblast and youth branches. He joined the Ukrainian Republican Party upon its foundation, serving as a member until 1993. He left the Christian-Democratic Party in March 1995. Derkach was an unsuccessful candidate in the 1994 Ukrainian parliamentary election for Sambir, placing third. After leaving office, he was an adviser to the Verkhovna Rada on administrative reform and integration with the law of the European Union from 1994 to 1997 and from 1997 to 1998, respectively. He currently works as a lawyer for PBN, a strategic communications firm.
