= Old Kyiv =

Neighbourhood of Kyiv

Coordinates: 50°27′30″N 30°30′58″E

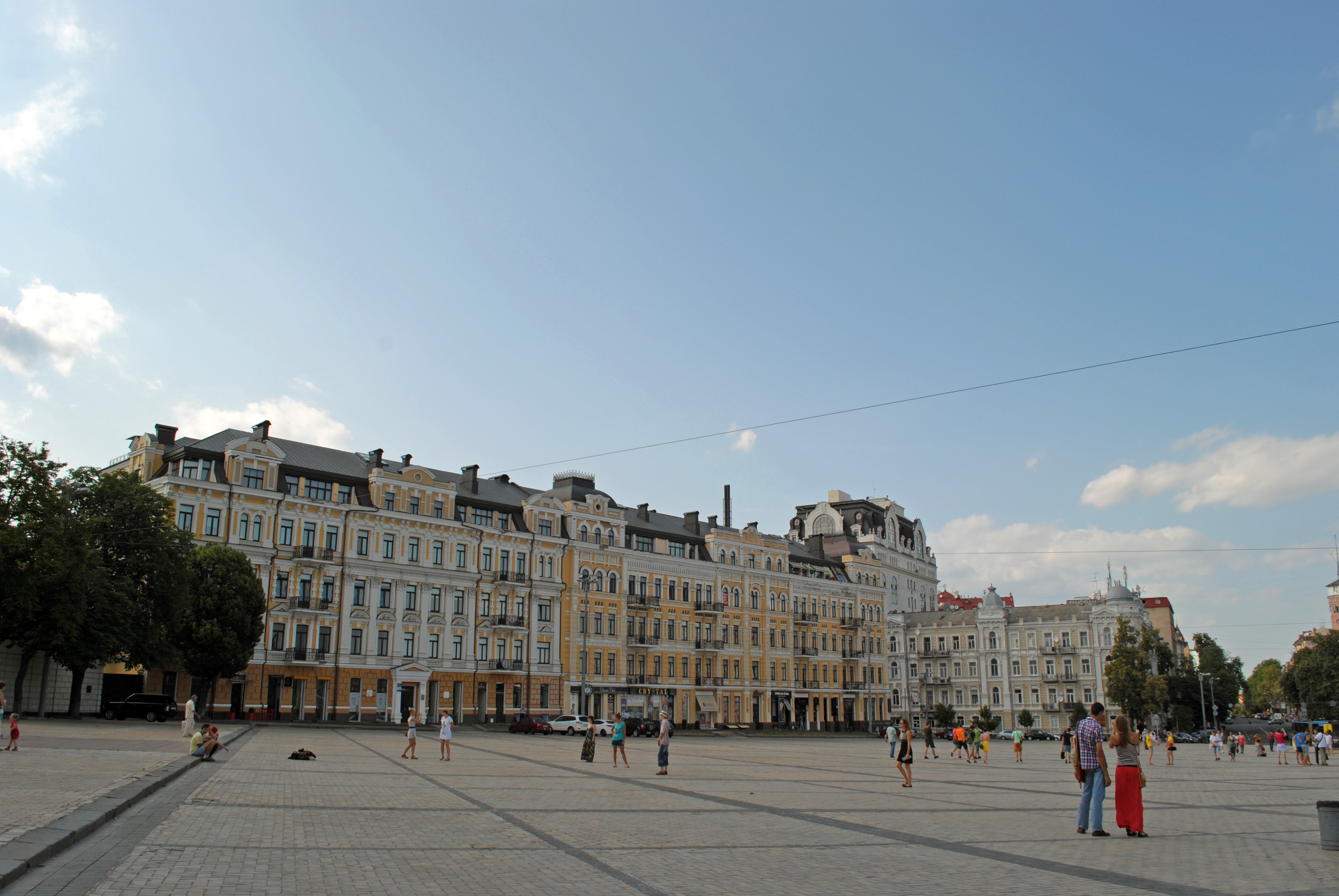
Sophia Square in Old Kyiv, 2013

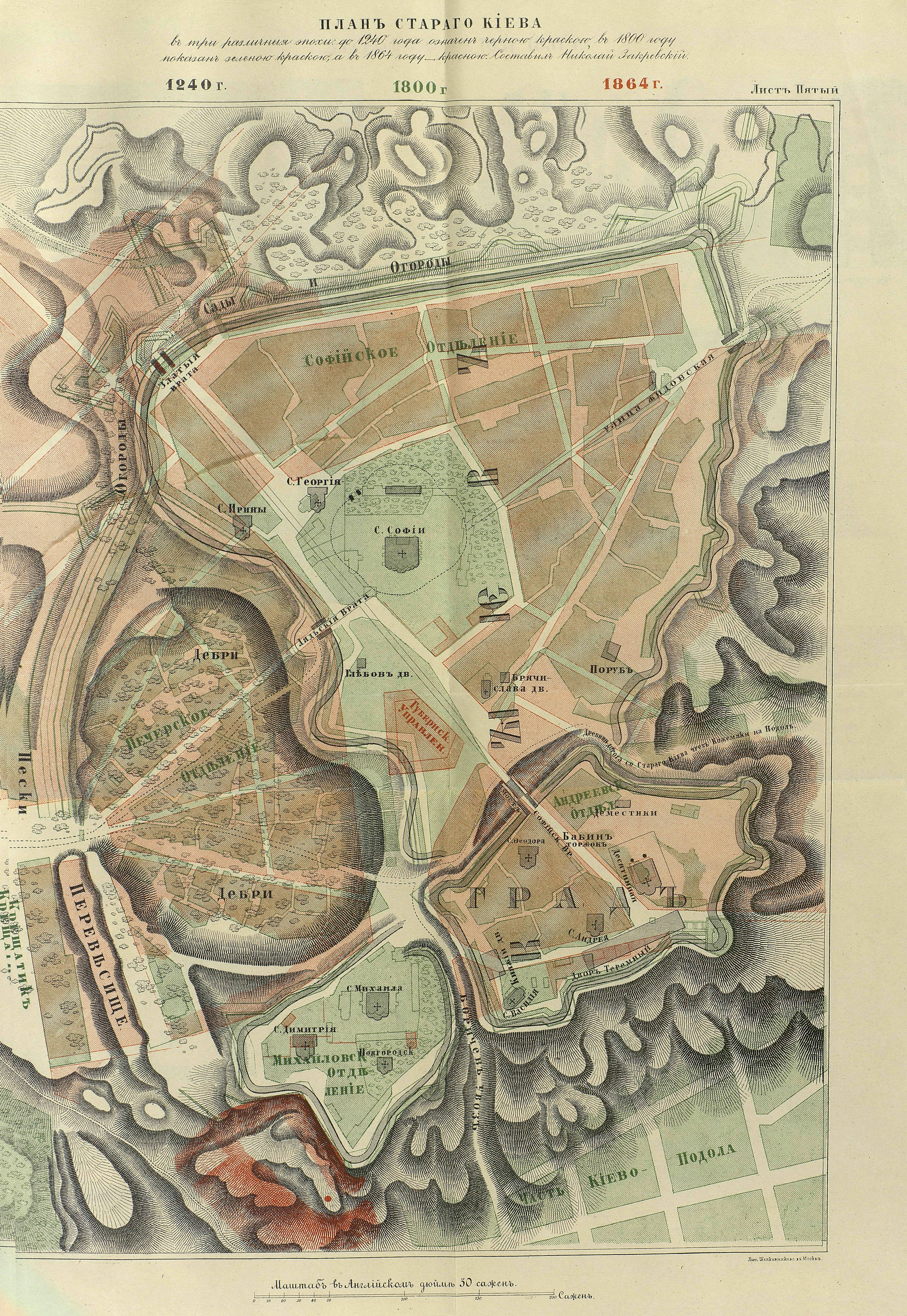
Scheme of the Old Kyiv. (Mykola Zakrevskyi. "Description of Kyiv." Moscow, 1868. Volume 2.)

Old Kyiv (Ukrainian: Старий Київ, romanized: Staryi Kyiv, IPA: [stɐˈrɪj ˈkɪjiu̯]) is a historical neighborhood of Kyiv. Other names include Upper City (Ukrainian: Верхнє місто, Ukrainian pronunciation: [ˈʋɛrxnʲe ˈmʲisto]; as opposed to Podil, the "Lower City"), Old Town, and others. It is located at the far eastern portion of the Shevchenkivskyi District. The approximate boundaries are St. Andrew's Church, Volodymyrska Hill, Independence Square, Golden Gate, Kyiv Velodrome (alias Kyiv Velotrack or Kyiv Bicycle Track), and Lvivska Square.

== Historical development ==
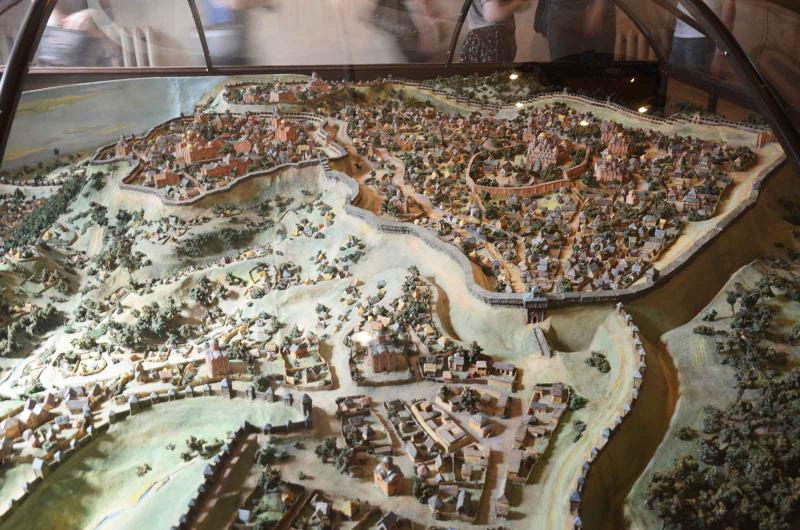
Model of the City of Volodymyr around the year 1000.

This part of the city originated at the Old Kyiv Hill (Starokyivska Hora), developing in contrast to the Lower City, Podil. According to the legend recorded in the Primary Chronicle, this was the place where the four siblings Kyi, Shchek, Khoryv and Lybid' founded the city at some unknown date. In the 9th–10th centuries it covered only 2 ha (4.9 acres), mostly at the western portion of the Old Kyiv Hill.

The first fortifications supposedly were built during the reign of Volodymyr the Great, creating what is known as the City of Volodymyr that covered already 12 ha (30 acres). However, during the times of Yaroslav the Wise in 1037 the area of the Upper City consisted of 80–98 ha (200–240 acres). The city of Yaroslav included monasteries such as the Sophia monastery and the monasteries of Saint George and Saint Iryna. It also included the city of Iziaslav around the Saint Michael's Golden Dome Monastery and the Kopyriv Kinets.

Old Kyiv historically represents the city of Yaroslav the Wise before it was presumably destroyed by the Mongol invasion of Batu Khan in 1240. After the Mongol devastation of the city in 1240, the Upper City lost its significance, and the Kyiv city centre was transferred to Podil. During the Polish–Russian War (1654–1667), the city was secured by Russia through financial compensation. During that time, the Upper City was reinforced with a number of fortifications when Kyiv started to quarter a Russian garrison. However, the garrison was soon transferred to Pechersk (Caves), and fortifications were decaying and getting ruined.

In the 19th century, the whole area came under complete reconstruction. It was then that the modern network of streets, squares, and parks was established. The National Historical Museum of Ukraine, under several names, has stood at the location since 1899.

== Attractions ==
- St. Michael's Golden-Domed Monastery
- Saint Sophia's Cathedral
- St Andrew's Church
- Volodymyrska Hill
- National University of Theatre, Film and TV
- Golden Gates
- Building of the Ministry of Foreign Affairs (location of former Saint Basil [Three-Saints] Church)
- Bohdan Khmelnytskyi Monument

== Gallery ==
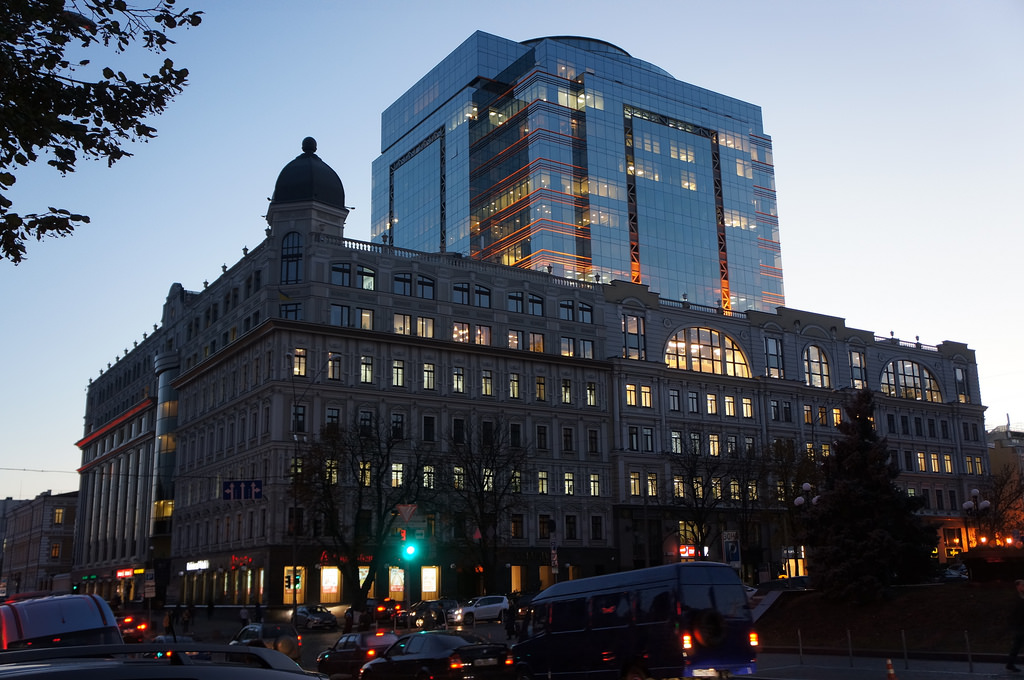
Old and new buildings on the intersection of Volodymyrska and Bohdan Khmelnytskyi Street

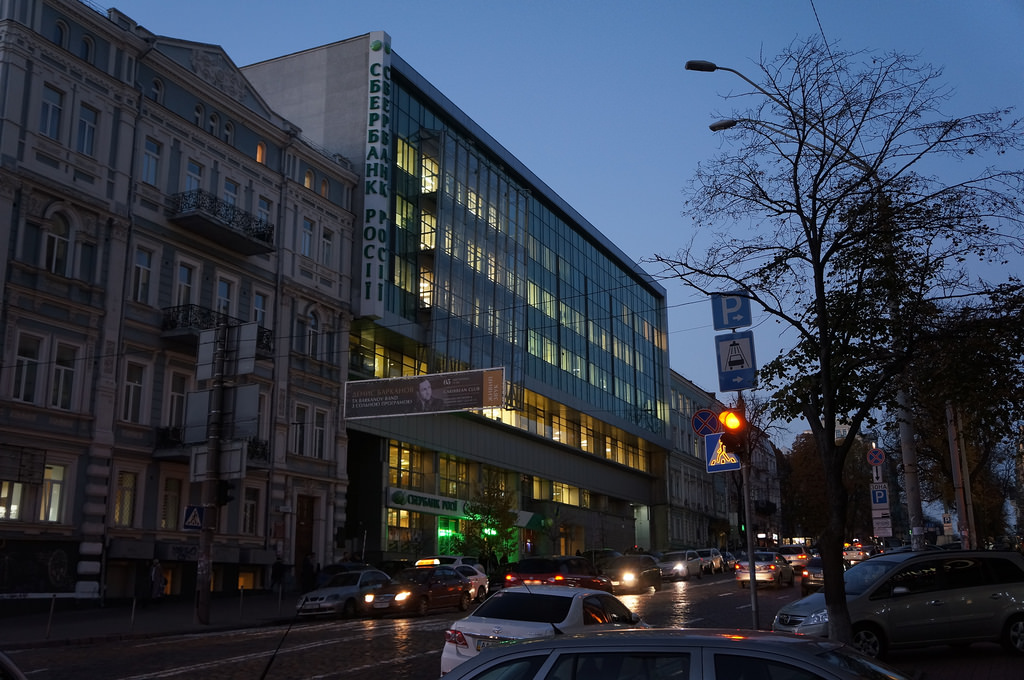
Volodymyrska Street, looking north

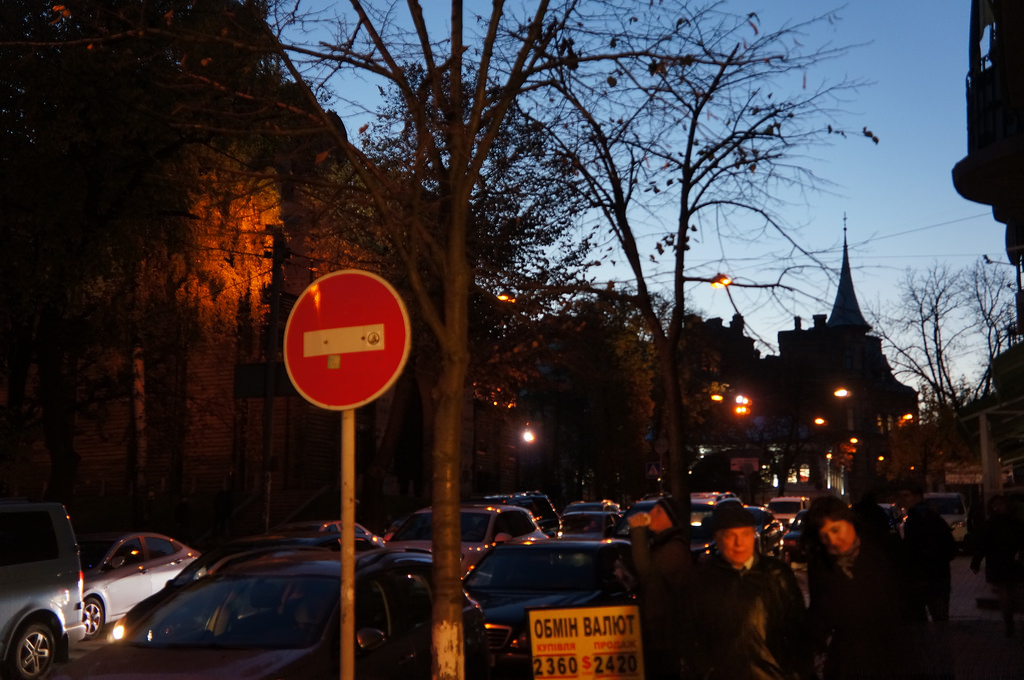
View of Yaroslaviv Val near the Golden Gate

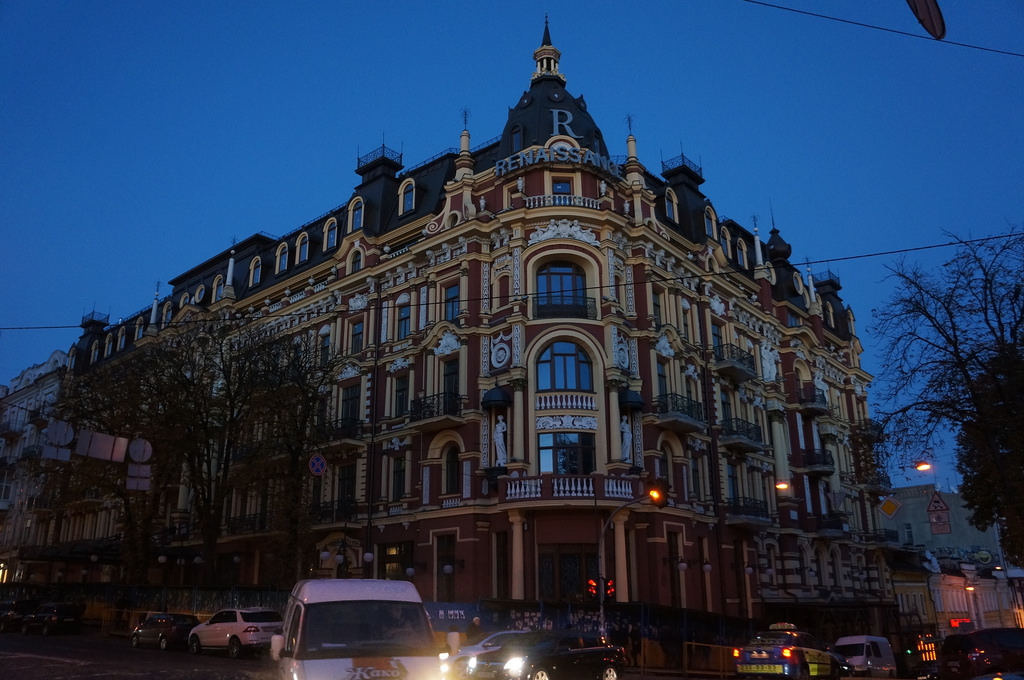
Historic building on Volodymyrska Street

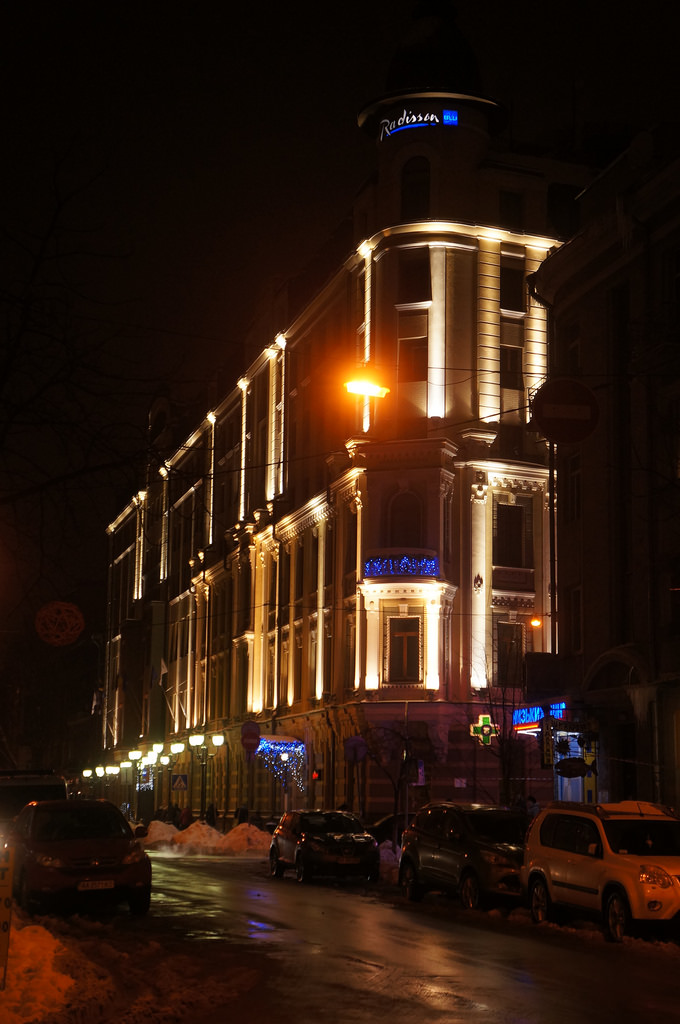
Radisson Blu Hotel, Yaroslaviv Val Street

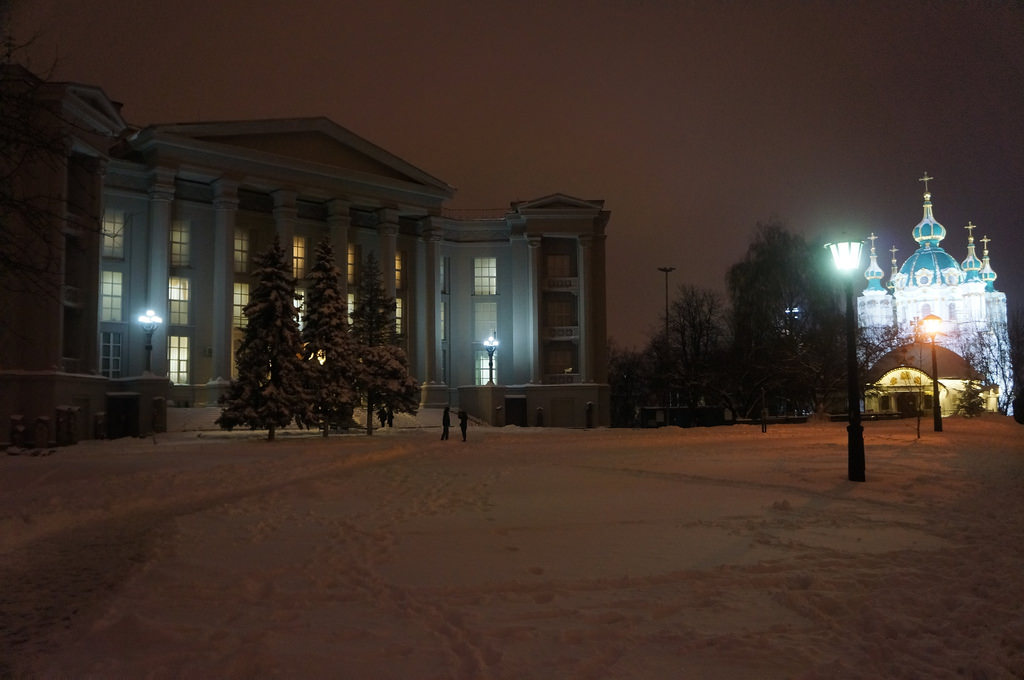
National History Museum of Ukraine and St. Andrew's Church

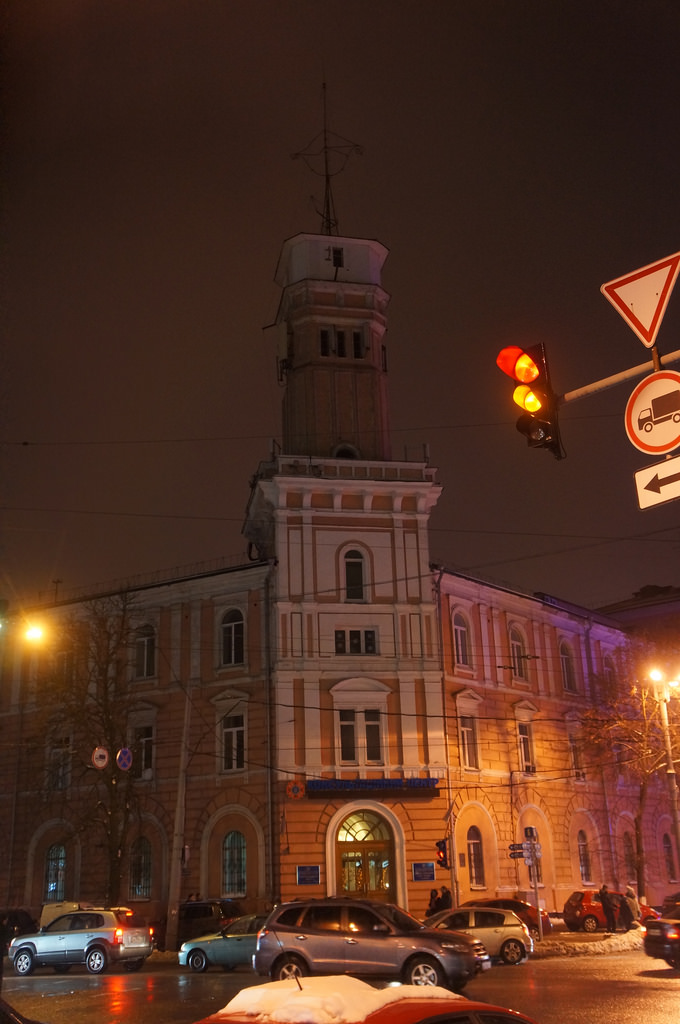
Old fire station on Velyka Zhytomyrska Street

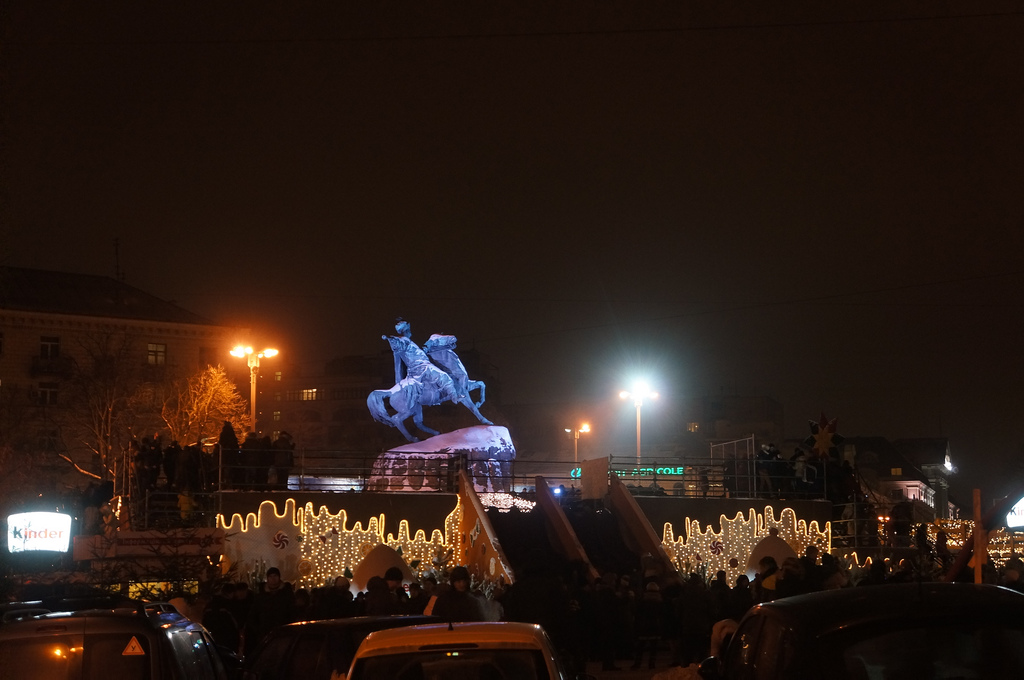
Bohdan Khmelnytskyi monument
