= Death and funeral of Patriarch Volodymyr of Kyiv =

1995 death and burial of a Ukrainian Eastern Orthodox patriarch

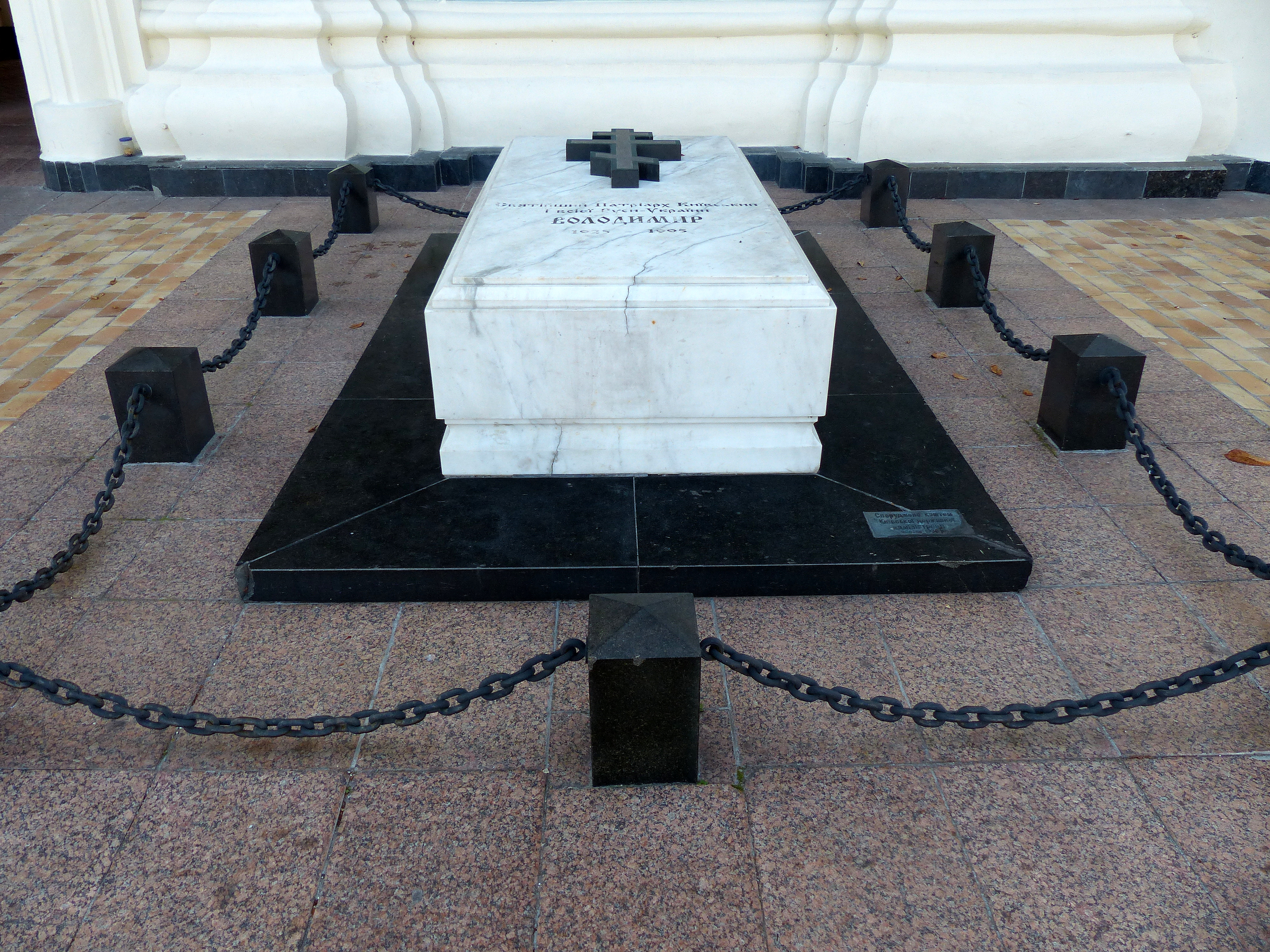
- Grave of the patriarch near the bell tower of St. Sophia Cathedral
- Date: 18 July 1995
- Location: Sophia Square, Kyiv, Ukraine; 50°27′10.8″N 30°30′55.39″E
- Goals: Burial of Volodymyr Romaniuk in Saint Sophia Cathedral
- Concessions: Romaniuk buried in Sophia Square

Parties
Ministry of Internal Affairs: Berkut; Internal Troops of Ukraine; Ukrainian Orthodox Church (Moscow Patriarchate)	Ukrainian Orthodox Church – Kyiv Patriarchate; Ukrainian People's Self-Defence

Lead figures
Yuriy Kravchenko	Filaret Denysenko; Dmytro Korchynsky

Casualties and losses
35 injured	25 injured; 2 dead (claimed by UNSO)

Patriarch Volodymyr Romaniuk of the Ukrainian Orthodox Church – Kyiv Patriarchate died on 14 July 1995. His funeral subsequently turned into a riot, popularly known as Black Tuesday (Ukrainian: чорний вівторок, romanized: chornyi vivtorok), after members of the Berkut special police force attempted to prevent mourners from accessing Kyiv's St. Sophia Cathedral, with members of the far-right Ukrainian People's Self-Defence attacking members of the security forces. It was the first incident of police attacking a peaceful gathering in Ukraine since 1991.

== Background ==
Volodymyr Romaniuk was patriarch of the Ukrainian Orthodox Church – Kyiv Patriarchate from its founding until his death on 14 July 1995. Prior to that, he had been a bishop of the Ukrainian Autocephalous Orthodox Church, and before that a political prisoner associated with the Ukrainian Helsinki Group. The establishment of the UOC–KP, an autocephalous (albeit unrecognised) Eastern Orthodox church in Ukraine, was a significant source of national pride for Ukrainians following independence, though it was significantly outnumbered by the Ukrainian Orthodox Church (Moscow Patriarchate) in terms of believers and parishes.

Following the former's establishment, the UOC–KP and UOC (MP) had been involved in a bitter struggle over control of Ukraine's dominant religious sites. The struggle soon came to involve the political scene; President Leonid Kravchuk was a supporter of the UOC–KP, while Prime Minister and later President Leonid Kuchma backed the UOC(MP). Kravchuk initially promised Kyiv's Saint Sophia Cathedral to the UOC–KP, but following Kuchma's 1994 election as president, these plans fell through.

The exact circumstances of Romaniuk's death are unclear and a matter of some dispute; officially ruled as a heart attack, several Ukrainian nationalists, among them politician Roman Zvarych, have claimed that the circumstances of Romaniuk's death were violent, contrary to autopsy reports.

== Funeral ==
=== Funeral procession ===
UOC–KP leadership initially intended for Romaniuk to be buried in Baikove Cemetery. However, they later changed their mind, determining that, as the first Patriarch of an independent Ukrainian Orthodox church, he would be buried at Saint Sophia Cathedral. The government rejected these plans, citing the last-minute nature and the need for technical studies of the cathedral before such an act could be allowed. After four days of negotiations (with which most high-ranking officials were uninvolved), and with summer heat causing the Patriarch's body to decay, the UOC–KP agreed not to bury him at Saint Sophia Cathedral.

On 18 July, 1995, the day of the funeral, a morning memorial service for Romaniuk took place in Kyiv's Saint Volodymyr Cathedral, which belonged to UOC-KP. The event was attended by 3,000 people, including 200 members of the Ukrainian People's Self-Defence (UNSO), a far-right paramilitary group, which had been previously affiliated with Romaniuk, and whose activists carried the late patriarch's casket. After the end of the service, at around 2 pm, the procession left the cathedral and started its march towards the city centre, allegedly in order to pray before the monument to Taras Shevchenko in front of Kyiv University's main building. However, upon reaching the Kyiv City Teacher's House, the column turned left along Volodymyrska Street, in the direction of Sophia Square. According to Prime Minister Yevhen Marchuk, the decision to travel to Sophia Square rather than Baikove Cemetery had been made spontaneously by former President Leonid Kravchuk and People's Deputy Mykola Porovskyi, who were leading the procession.

=== Riot ===
The approach to St. Sophia Cathedral was guarded by officers of the Berkut special police force, who were ordered to prevent Volodymyr's body from entering the building. Responding to the blockade, UNSO members began attacking Berkut, leading to a full-fledged riot. After a number of assaults, they could break the police cordon, and at approximately 5 pm the procession entered Sophia Square. UNSO and UOC–KP members, seeing the police presence at Saint Sophia Cathedral, were enraged by the effort to keep them from the church, and mourners began hammering the asphalt in Sophia Square, near the bell tower. As the gates of the church had been locked, it was decided to perform the burial right under its walls, as not to violate the religious rule, according to which the dead are to be buried before sundown. According to one of the participants, the patriarch's grave was dug by members of parliament, as they were the only participants of the march to possess legal immunity. Police forces, which were gathered inside of the cathedral complex, attempted to prevent the digging of the grave by releasing gas.

Finally, at 7:15 pm, the participants of the funeral started lowering the casket of patriarch Volodymyr into the grave. At the same moment, the gate of St. Sophia Cathedral was opened, and Berkut police officers rushed into the crowd, joined by regular policemen waiting for them outside. Berkut began attacking the mourners with tear gas and clubs in what police general Valery (according toother sources - Volodymyr) Budnikov later claimed was an effort to prevent sacrilege against the patriarch. UNSO activists attempted to fight off the assault with stones and spades used by them to dig the grave. According to witnesses, Berkut policemen indiscriminately attacked civilians who had gathered in the square, using force against elderly people, tearing the priests' robes and breaking their staffs. In some cases, they even assaulted fellow law enforcement personnel, beating up a number of internal troops and police cadets. Despite the brutal attack, participants of the ceremony managed to finish the burial, covering the grave with earth before being dispersed.

As a result of the clashes, 35 members of the Ukrainian security forces were injured, while 25 mourners were injured (alternative data puts the number of injured civilians at 33, although participants of the march claimed that number to be twice as high) and several were arrested. Several journalists and 18 bishops were among the wounded in the riot. According to the UNSO, two of their members were killed. 16 UNSO members were detained and questioned by the police The Berkut did not make any attempts to remove Romaniuk's coffin from the makeshift grave once it had already been dug.

== Aftermath ==
Pro-democracy leader Viacheslav Chornovil, who together with journalist Vitaliy Karpenko tried to prevent violence during the burial, blamed president Kuchma's entourage for provoking the riot, and demanded to put police officers who had issed commands to disperse the mourners on trial. The riot following Romaniuk's funeral quickly became a political headache for Kuchma, who was attending Belarus on a state visit during the incident. Kuchma waited for ten days before ultimately condemning police conduct during the burial in a low-key press conference, which ultimately cost him support. The government also accused the UNSO of being responsible for starting violence. Two criminal proceedings were initiated against the police and against participants of the march respectively, but none of them reached court. Volodymyr Budnikov, the deputy chief of Kyiv Police, was removed from his post in the aftermath of the riot, but eventually got appointed to head the police of Luhansk Oblast.

The funeral became a political issue during the 1999 Ukrainian presidential election, with candidate Yevhen Marchuk claiming the government had cooperated with foreign actors to orchestrate the event, thus decreasing support for the UOC–KP. More broadly, the funeral riots demonstrated competing visions of Ukraine's national identity between those who favoured and those who opposed closer ties with Russia. The conflict between the UOC–KP and UOC (MP) was questioned in news media, such as The Washington Post, following the incident.
