= Motherland (Ukraine) =

Motherland (Ukrainian: Вітчизна) is a political party in Ukraine established on 1 August 2001. The head of the party was general in reserves Vilen Martyrosian. Martyrosian is known as one of organizers of the Union of Officers of Ukraine (UOU).
