= Bohdan Khmelnytsky Monument, Kyiv =

Monument in Kyiv, Ukraine

Monument to Bohdan Khmelnytsky
- Пам'ятник Богданові Хмельницькому
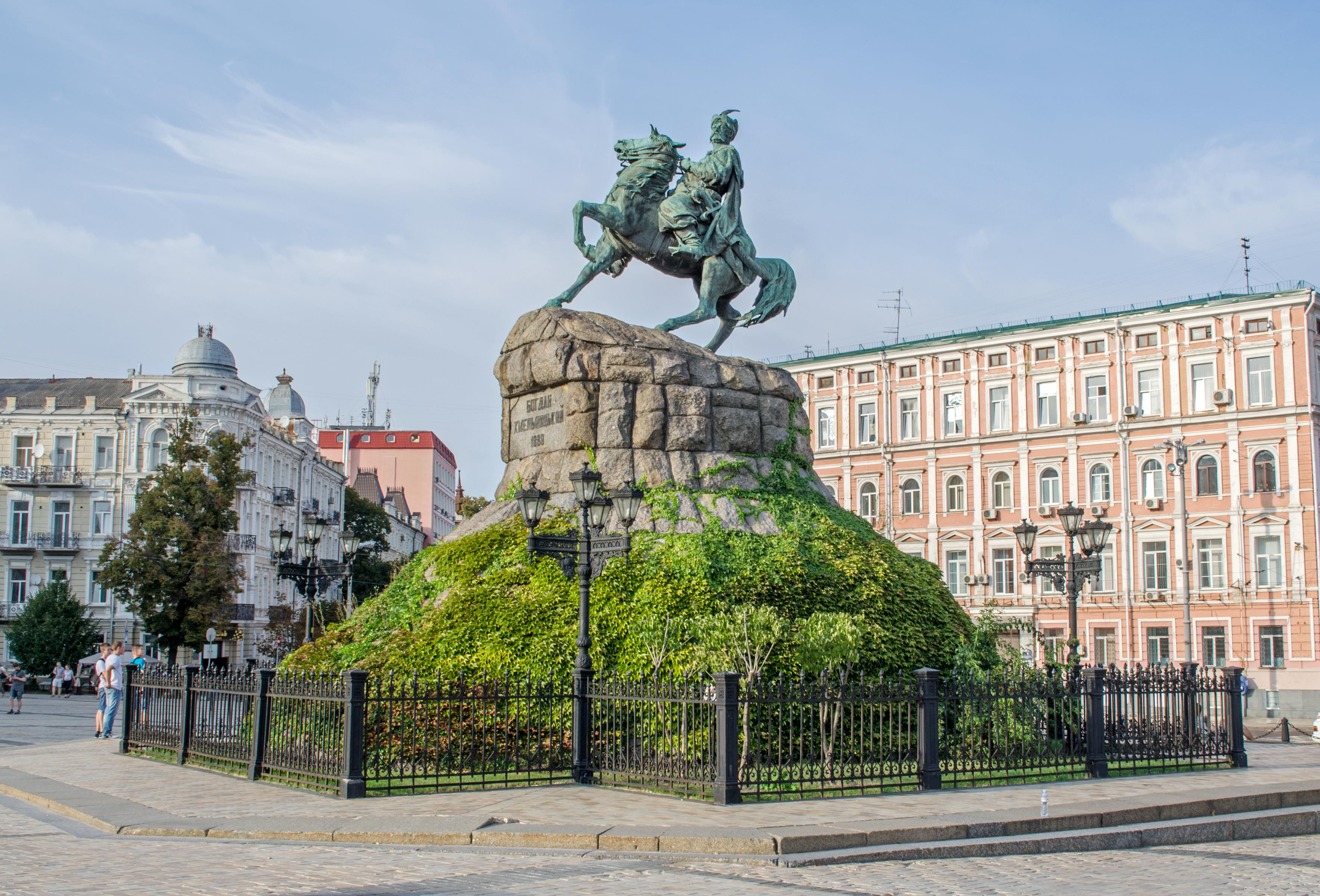
- The monument as it appears today, with the previous inscription covered up (Note: The original inscription read "For Bohdan Khmelnytsky, a Single Undivided Russia.")
- Interactive map of Monument to Bohdan Khmelnytsky
- Location: Sophia Square, Kyiv, Ukraine
- Coordinates: 50°27′13″N 30°30′59″E
- Designer: Mikhail Mikeshin (statue), Vladimir Nikolaev (pedestal)
- Type: Equestrian statue
- Material: bronze (statue), granite (pedestal)
- Completion date: 1888
- Dedicated to: Bohdan Khmelnytsky

Immovable Monument of National Significance of Ukraine
- Official name: Пам'ятник гетьману Богдану Хмельницькому (Monument to the Hetman Bohdan Khmelnytsky)
- Type: Monumental Art
- Reference no.: 260046-Н

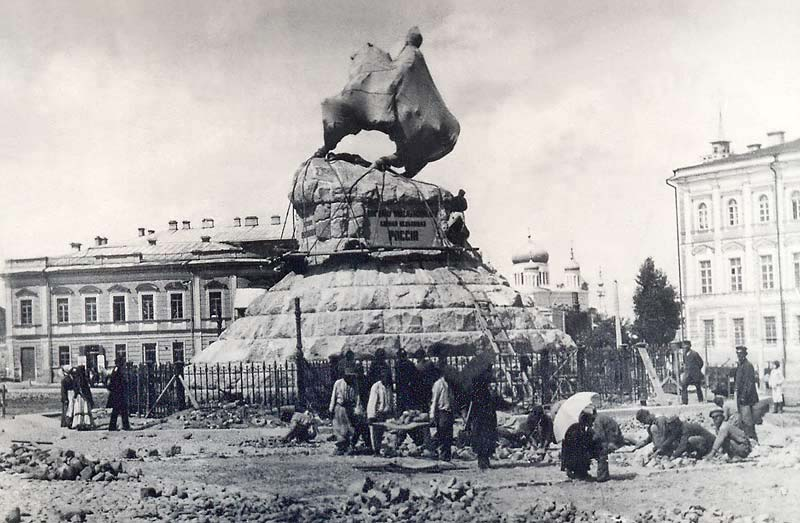
Installation of the monument in 1888 and the Church of the Tithes right behind the prospective view

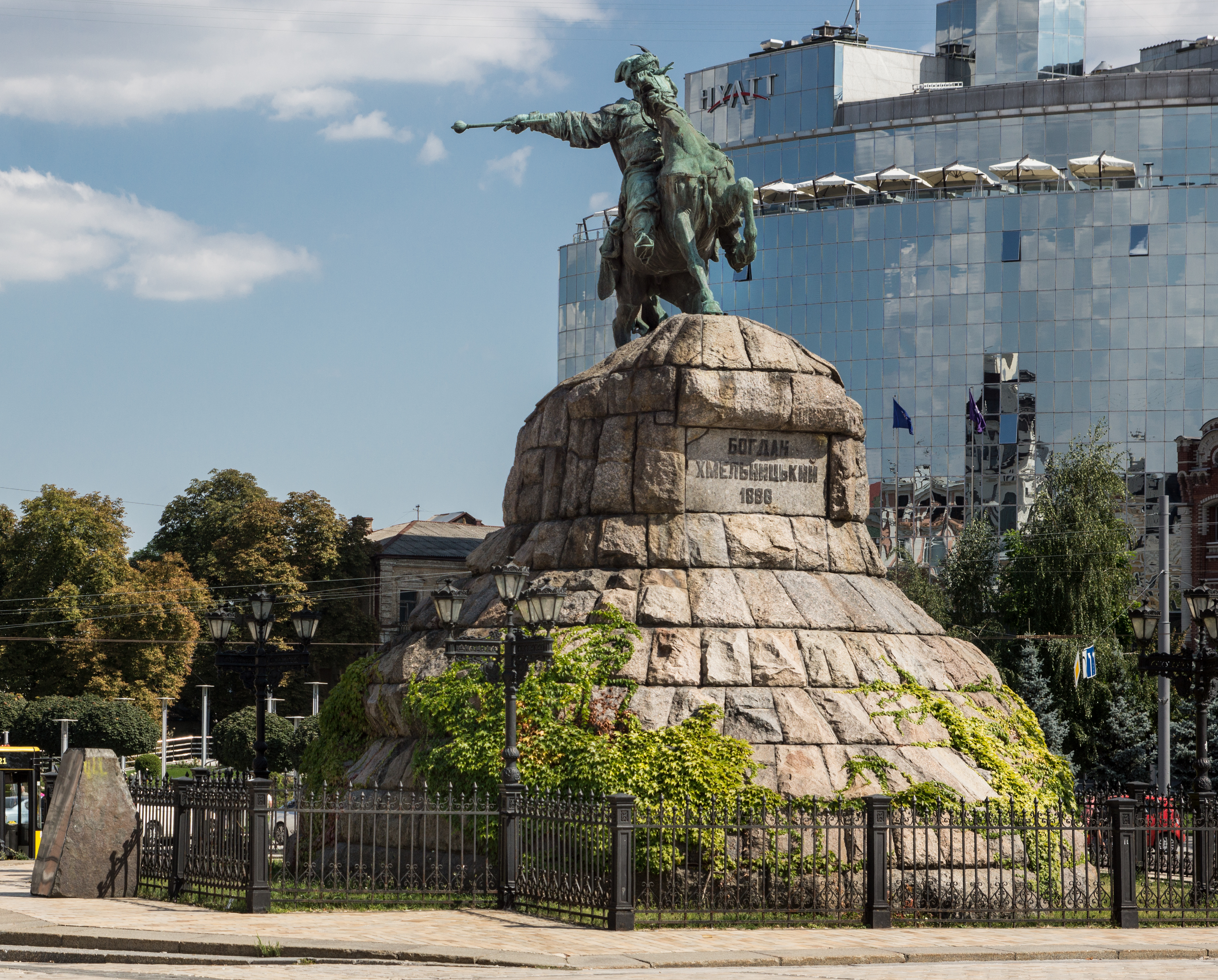
Side view with the right hand extended towards the "High City" center holding a bulawa

The Bohdan Khmelnytsky Monument (Ukrainian: Пам'ятник Богданові Хмельницькому, romanized: Pamiatnyk Bohdanovi Khmelnytskomu) is a monument in Kyiv dedicated to Bohdan Khmelnytsky, the first Hetman of the Zaporizhian Host. It was built in 1888 and is one of the oldest sculptural monuments in Kyiv. It is a dominating feature of Sophia Square and one of the city's symbols.

The monument is located almost in the middle of the Sophia Square (formerly the main city's square) on the axis that unites both belltowers of the Sophia Cathedral and the St. Michael's Monastery.

Here on 23 December 1648, residents of Kyiv met Khmelnytsky leading his Cossacks' regiments entering the city through the Golden Gates soon after the victory over Polish Army at the Battle of Pyliavtsi.

== History ==
The erection of the monument began on the initiative of Mykola Kostomarov, a historian and professor of the Saint Vladimir Imperial University of Kyiv in the 1840s. Mikhail Yuzefovich, the deputy commissioner of the Kyiv School District supported the idea and originally wanted to establish the monument for the 200th anniversary of the Council of Pereyaslav. The monument was supposed to be installed at Bessarabian Square, for which the square carried the name of Bohdan Khmelnytsky in 1869–1881. However, the construction was postponed due to the Crimean War. After receiving permission from the Imperial government in 1860 for the establishment of the monument, a committee was created and headed by Mikhail Yuzefovich.

The initial draft of the monument created by Mikhail Mikeshin was outright chauvinistic – Khmelnytsky's horse was dropping a Polish szlachcic, Jewish leaseholder, and Jesuit from a cliff, in front of which a Little Russian, Red Russian, White Russian, and Great Russian listened to a song of a blind kobzar. A basrelief of the pedestal was to show images of the Siege of Zbarazh, the Council of Pereyaslav, and a scene depicting the entrance of Khmelnytsky's Cossack Host into Kyiv.

In 1863, the erection of the monument was again postponed due to the 1863 January Uprising. In 1868 Mikeshin, who was already creating another Khmelnytsky monument for the Millennium of Russia in Novgorod, was offered a chance to create a draft for the monument in Kyiv. In 1869 the draft was approved and in 1870 fundraising began on Russian subscription. However, the committee decided to cut the budget due to the fact that the collected sum was relatively small (only 37,000 rubles), in addition to the fact that the Kyiv Governor-General Prince Aleksandr Dondukov-Korsakov perceived the original design of the monument to be anti-Polish and anti-Semitic in nature. As a result, the decision was made to leave only the central figure of the Hetman in the monument.

In 1877, a gypsum model of the monument was created. In 1879, a draft of the statue was cast at the Saint Petersburg Baird Works based on Mikeshin's draft by Pius Weloński and Artemiy Ober, and for which the Russian Imperial Naval department donated 1,600 poodi (25.6 t) of scrap metal. Portrait features and details of the Khmelnytsky's clothes were recreated based on the consultations of Volodymyr Antonovych.

In 1879, the statue was brought to Kyiv; however, due to a lack of funding for the construction of the pedestal, installation work ceased until the mid-1880s and the statue remained on holdover for several years in the courtyard of the Kyiv Government Office Building (Будинок присутніх місць). The city architect Vladimir Nikolayev designed a simpler pedestal and supervised its construction as well as the installation of the monument. The Kyiv Fortress administration donated granite blocks for the pedestal that had been left over from the construction of the Nicholas Chain Bridge over Dnieper. A grand opening and consecration of the monument took place on 23 June 1888.

Since 2001, the object has been included in the State Register of Immovable Monuments of Ukraine as a monument of national importance.

== Gallery ==
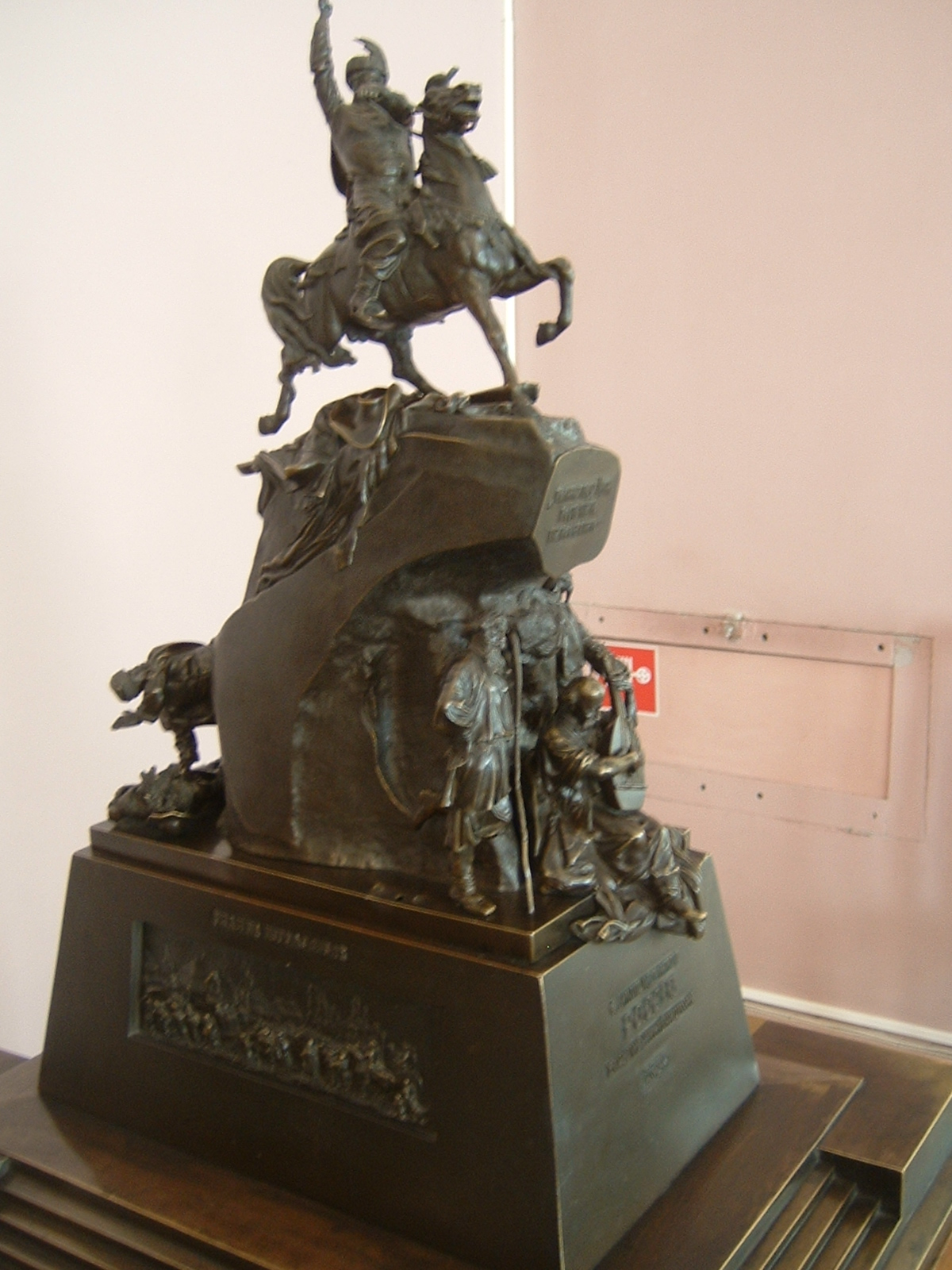
Initial draft, 1869

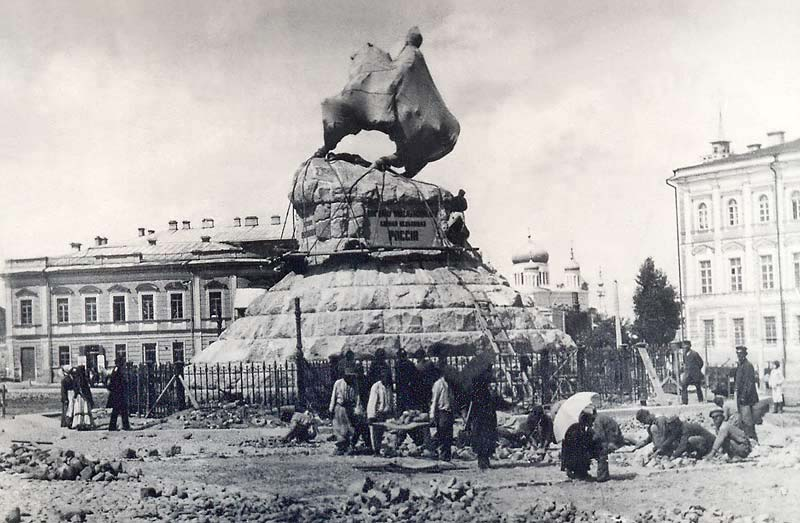
Installation of the monument in 1888

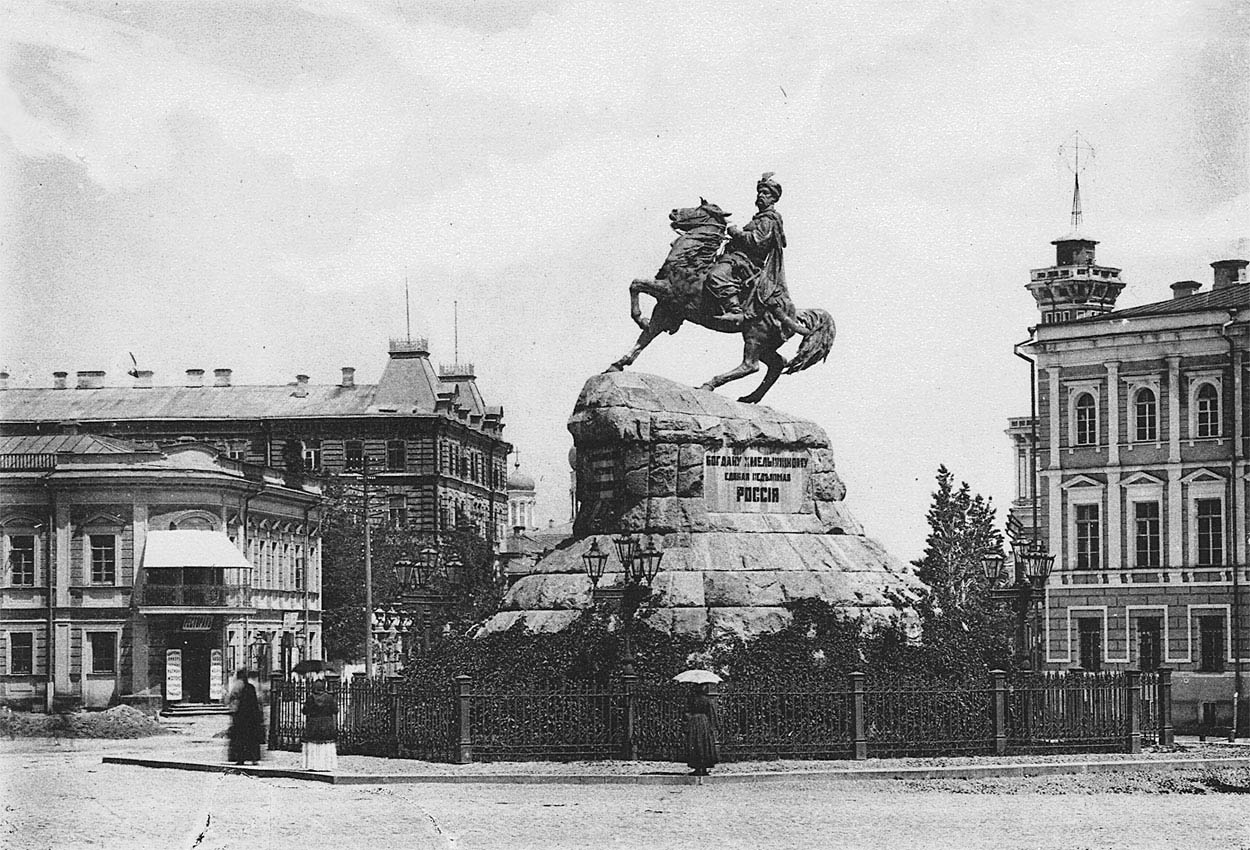
The monument at the turn of the 19th century

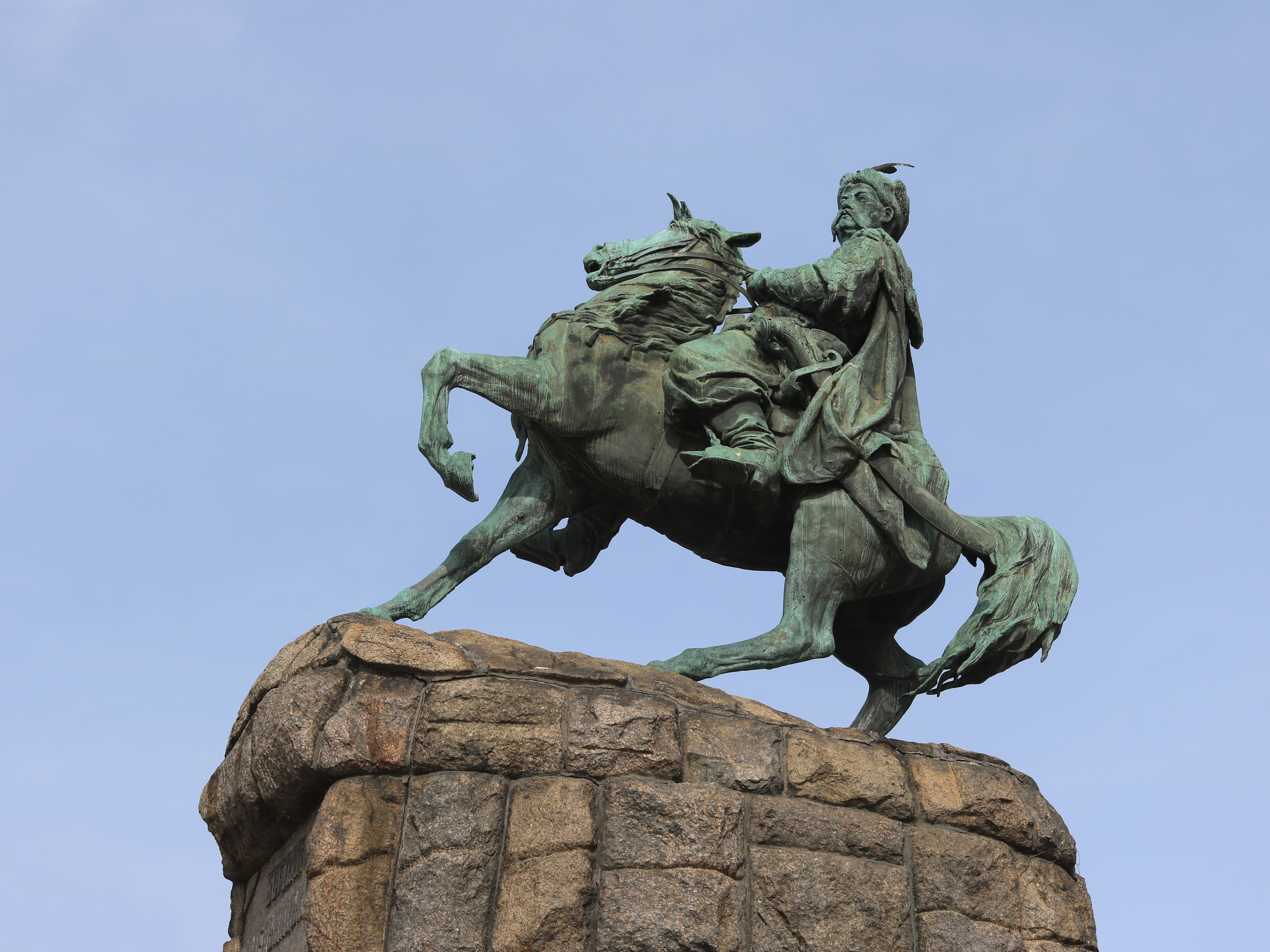
Up close, 2017

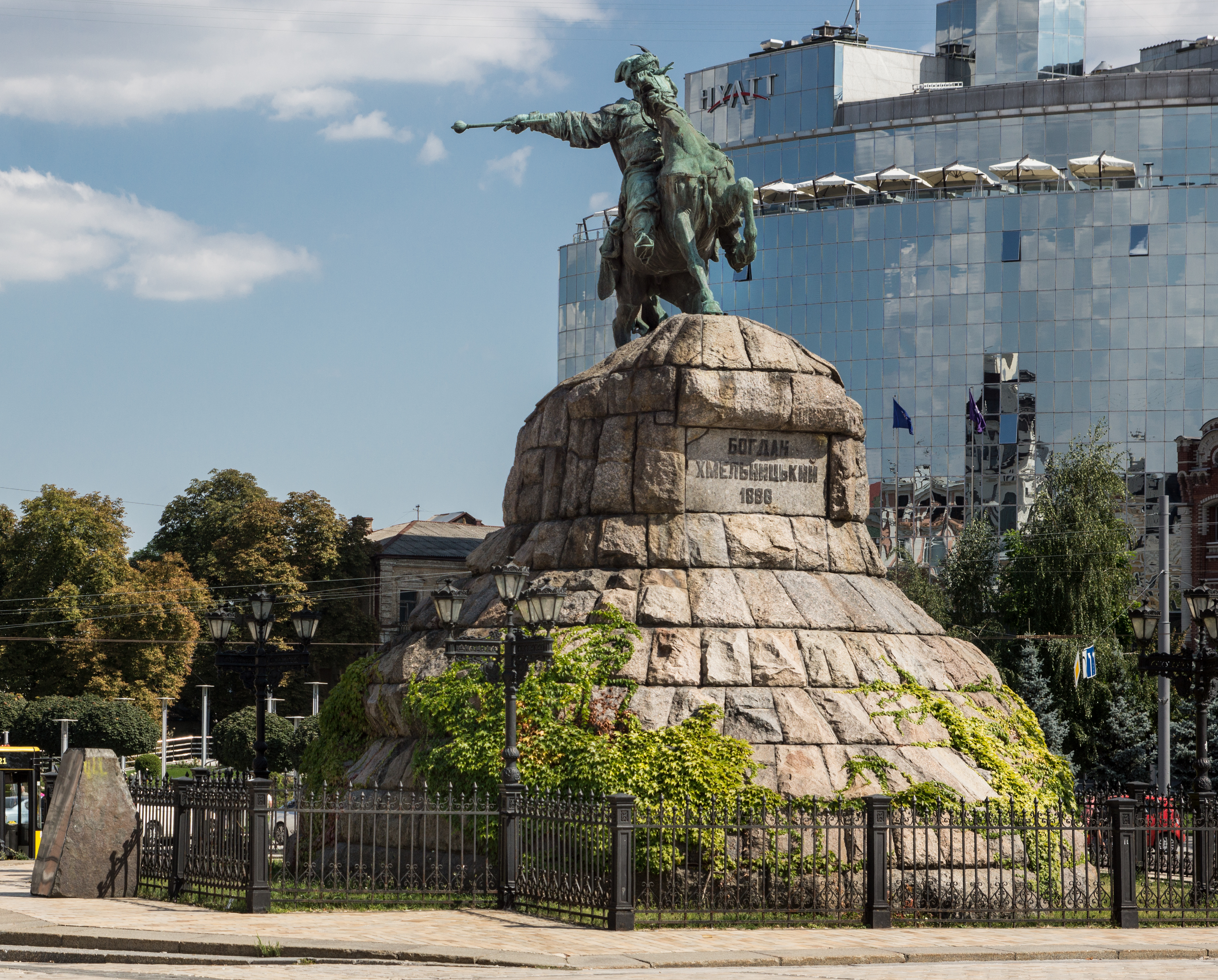
View of the monument in front of the Hyatt hotel

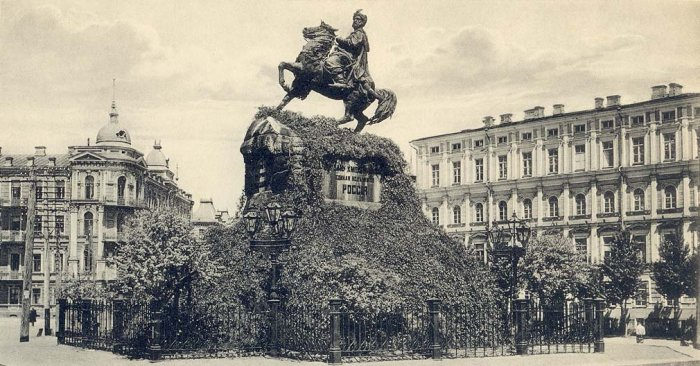
The monument at the beginning of the 20th century, with the original inscription, "Bohdan Khmelnitsky, a Single Undivided Russia" visible

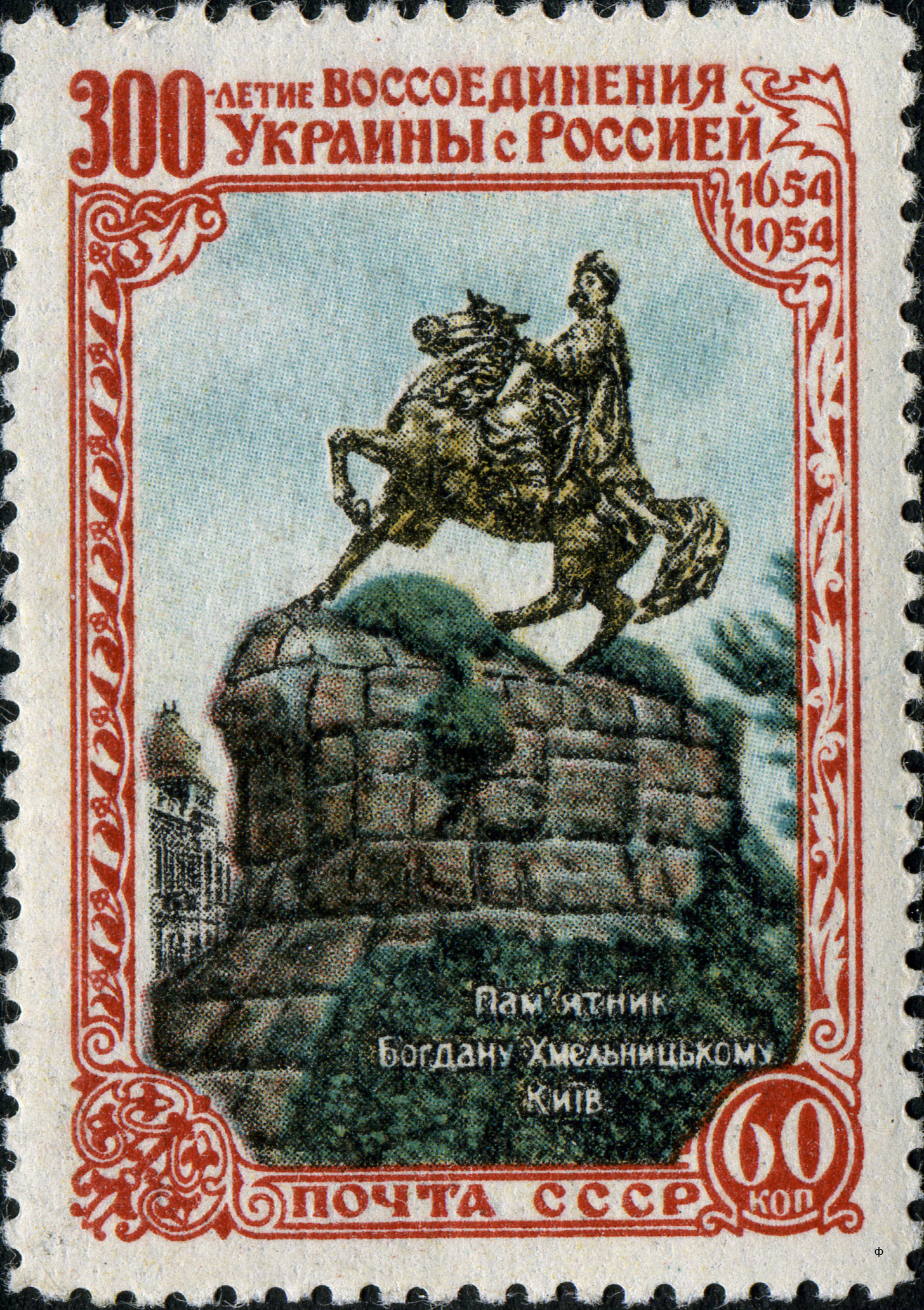
Depicted on a 1954 USSR stamp marking 300 years of Russian–Ukrainian union

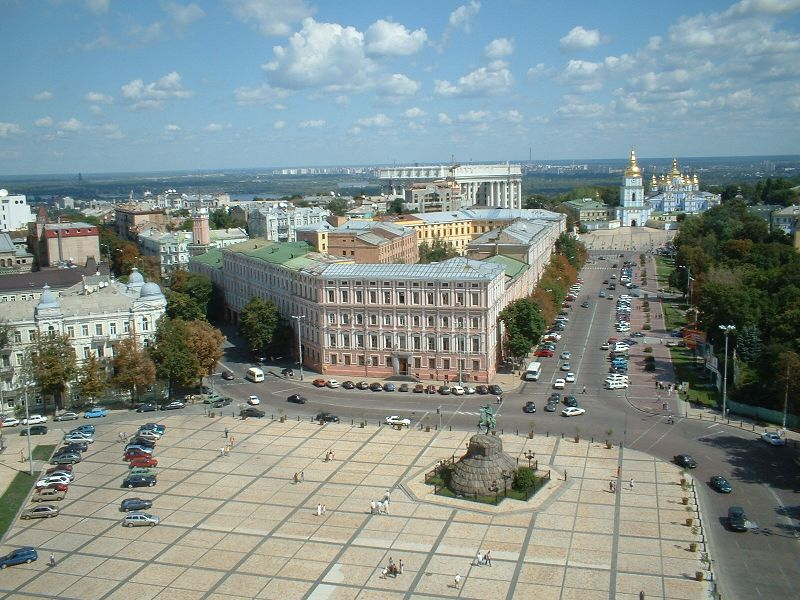
View of the monument on Sophia Square (Sofiiska Ploshcha), behind it stands the "Prisutstvinyie mesta" building

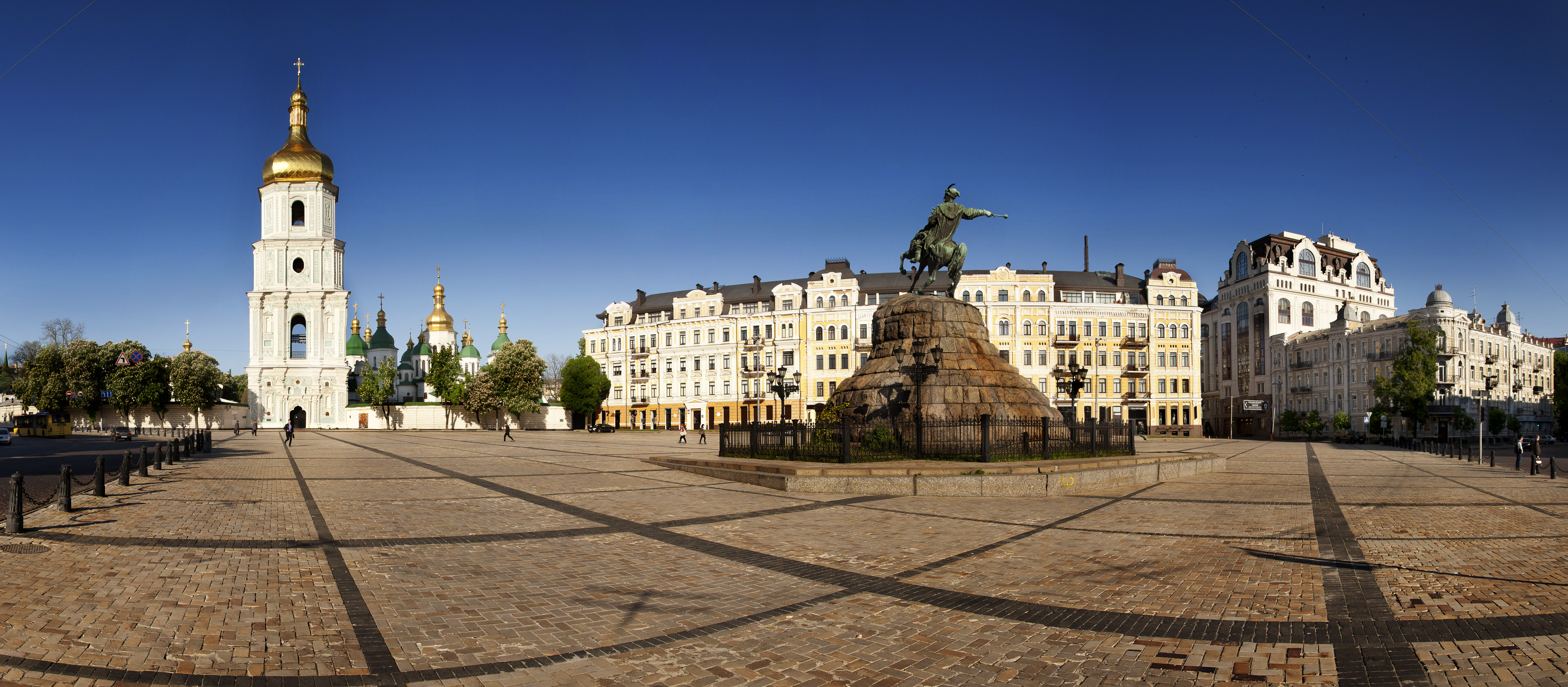
View of the monument amid Sophia Square

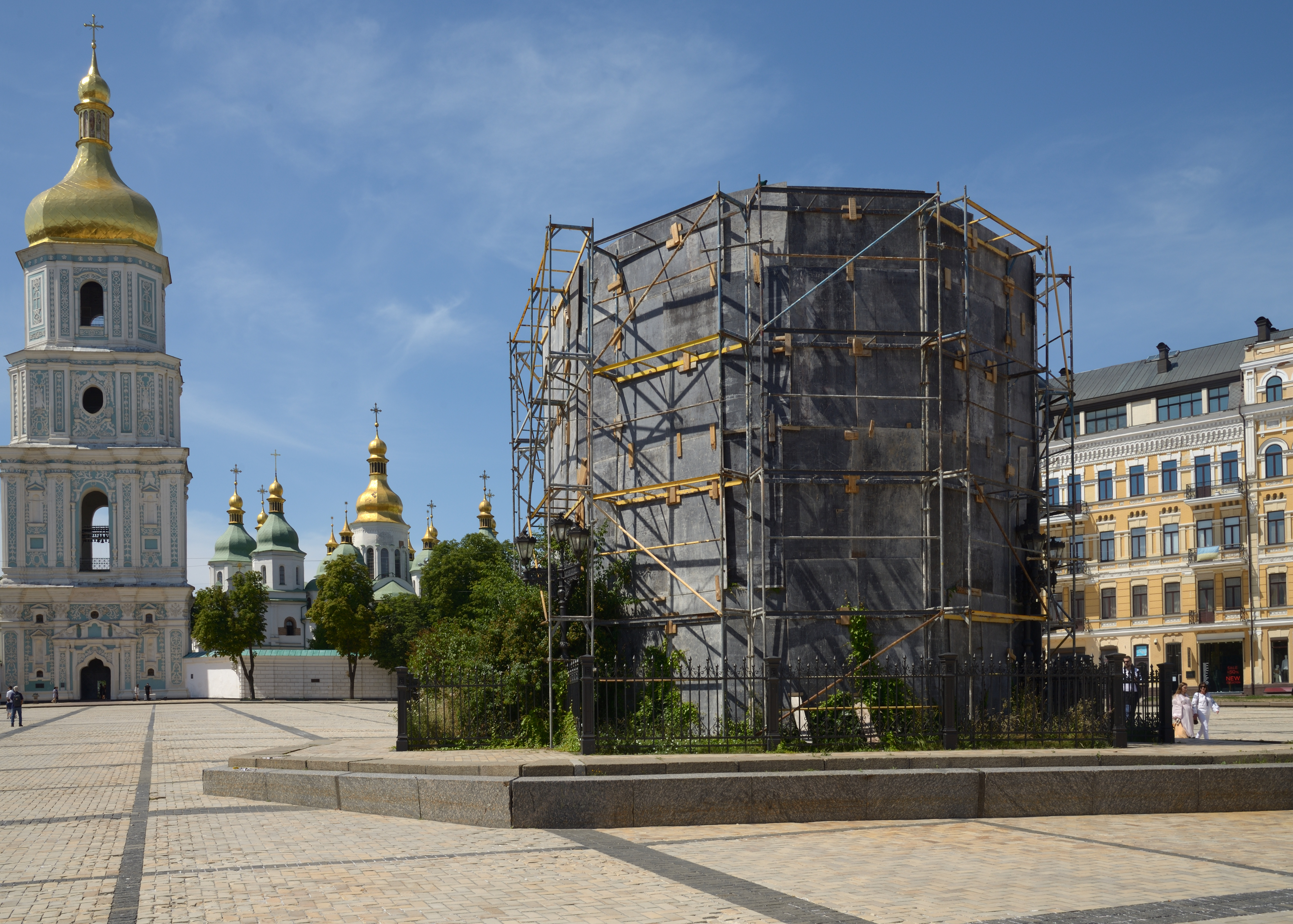
View of the monument during the Russian Invasion of Ukraine. Kyiv, July 2022

== See also ==
- Cossack Hetmanate
- Arch of Freedom of the Ukrainian people
