= Berkut (special police force) =

Former Ukrainian and current Russian paramilitary unit

Special Detachment of Public Security Militsiya "Berkut" (Ukrainian: Cпеціальний підрозділ міліції громадської безпеки «Беркут») (Russian: Подразделение милиции особого назначения «Беркут»)
- Emblem of the Berkut
- Active: 16 January 1992 – 25 February 2014 (Ukraine) 25 March 2014 – present (Russia)
- Country: Ukraine (1992–2014); Russia (2014–present)
- Allegiance: Militsiya (1992–2014)
- Type: Police tactical unit
- Size: 400 (Russia)
- Part of: Ukrainian Ministry of Internal Affairs (1992–2014); Russian Ministry of Internal Affairs (2014–2016); National Guard of Russia (2016–present)
- Engagements: Euromaidan; Revolution of Dignity; Annexation of Crimea by the Russian Federation; 2022 protests in Russian-occupied Ukraine; Ukrainian resistance during the Russian invasion of Ukraine

Insignia
- Former emblem (1992–2014, Ukraine)

Berkut (Ukrainian: Беркут; "golden eagle") was the Ukrainian system of special police (riot police) of the Ukrainian Militsiya within the Ministry of Internal Affairs. The agency was formed on 16 January 1992, shortly after the dissolution of the Soviet Union, as the successor to the Ukrainian SSR's OMON.

Initially specialized in fighting organized crime, Berkut transitioned into a gendarmerie used by the Ukrainian Militsiya for public security, operating semi-autonomously at the local or regional level. The term "Berkut" came to be used for any professional special police unit in Ukraine. Prior to the 2014 Ukrainian revolution, the Berkut had a history of illegal activities against Ukrainian citizens, such as racketeering, terrorism, physical violence, torture, anti-Ukrainian sentiment, voter intimidation and other secret police tactics against those who would elect non-Yanukovych candidates. It committed violence against protesters during Euromaidan and the Orange Revolution. After the revolution, the new government held the Berkut responsible for most of the Heavenly Hundred civilian deaths. Acting Ukrainian Interior Minister Arsen Avakov dissolved the agency on 25 February 2014, replacing it with the National Guard of Ukraine.

On 25 March 2014, Berkut units stationed in the Autonomous Republic of Crimea and Sevastopol defected to the Russian Ministry of Internal Affairs during the annexation of Crimea by Russia, after the territories were approved as federal subjects.^{A} There, the Berkut effectively became a Russian agency. Units were allowed to preserve their old name and now serve within the National Guard of Russia as the gendarmerie for Crimea.

== Etymology ==
Berkut means golden eagle (Aquila chrysaetos) in the Ukrainian language, referring to a raptor historically associated with falconry on larger mammals, particularly foxes. It is a Turkic loanword.

== Ukraine ==
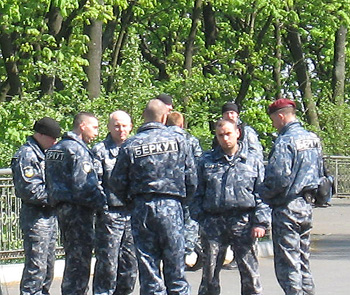
Berkut officers in 2007.

=== History ===
The Berkut was founded on 16 January 1992, three weeks after the dissolution of the Soviet Union, as the "Berkut" Separate Special Assignment Unit(s) of Militsiya to serve the newly independent Ukraine as the replacement of the Ukrainian SSR's branch of the Soviet OMON (Special Purpose Police Unit). The order to organize the OMON in the Ukrainian SSR had been issued on 28 December 1988, over a year after the establishment of the Soviet OMON back in 1987 and almost three months later after the issue of official order on 3 October 1988.

The first OMON units in Ukraine were formed in Kyiv, Dnipropetrovsk, Odesa, Lviv, and Donetsk and were based on selected units of Soviet Internal Troops of the Soviet Ministry of Internal Affairs. After Ukrainian independence, it was decided to organize OMON units in every oblast (province) center as part of the Ukrainian Ministry of Internal Affairs. The new agency was fully implemented by the start of 1993, and inherited Ukrainian OMON's functions, including responsibility for high-risk police operations including hostage crises and riot policing, but primarily as a quick reaction force with a focus on combating organized crime.

=== Organization ===
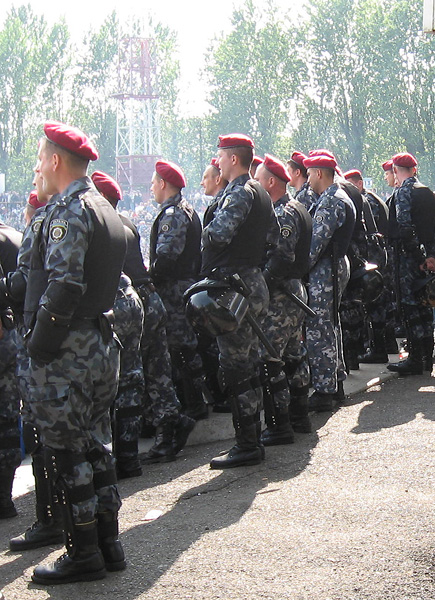
Berkut officers stand guard during a football match.

The Berkut was a reserve unit of the Ministry of Internal Affairs (MVS) and subordinates to the regional (oblast) departments of the MVS. Until 1997 it was under the direct supervision of HUBOZ (Chief Directorate in Fight against Organized Crime). Due to formation of another quick reaction force unit Sokil (Falcon) under HUBOZ, Berkut was later reassigned under the supervision of the Directorate of Public Security of the MVS.

The main duty of the unit was the security of the general public and enforcement of civil order, especially during mass public events (demonstrations, parades, sport or concert events, etc.), or in places of increased criminal activity as part of the fight against organized crime. The Berkut have also been assigned to provide protective custody of certain individuals, such as witnesses in criminal trials.

Berkut members were paid 1.5-2 times more than the average Ukrainian police officer. Depending on the region, the Berkut's units ranged in manpower from 50 to 600. Also depending on its dislocation, the unit could have been commissioned as a company or regiment. As of January 2008, the force consisted of two regiments, six separate battalions, and 19 companies totaling 3,250 members. One of the regiments was located in Kyiv, and the other one was stationed in Crimea. During the maidan protest movement Berkut members from Western Ukraine (a region leaning towards pro-Euromaidan) complained to the media that they were "mistrusted" by top commanders.

The Berkut militia were distinguished by their maroon berets (also known as "krapovy beret"), an honorary headgear. Standard Berkut equipment includes AKM assault rifles, PK machine guns, Dragunov SVD sniper rifles, UAZ-469 jeeps and the BTR-70 armoured personnel carriers. During the Euromaidan protests, the Berkut were also issued with Fort-500M pump-action shotguns loaded with slugs. Some units are issued with the SPG-9 recoilless rifle and RPG-7 on a need basis.

=== Criticism ===
==== Political violence ====
The Berkut has increasingly developed a reputation for engaging in political-related violence, including acts of police brutality and extrajudicial punishment against anti-government protesters, activists, and voters.

On 25 June 1995, during mass riots of Crimean Tatars who started so called "turf war" against the Crimean gang Bashmaki, Berkut policemen from Poltava on the highway near Sudak, (Autonomous Republic of Crimea) opened fire with the intention to kill from automatic weapons which resulted in seven people being wounded and two killed.

On 18 July 1995, Berkut was involved in a partially successful attempt to prevent the burial of Patriarch Volodymyr (Romaniuk) on the territory of St.Sophia monastery (surrounds the Saint Sophia's Cathedral). That day is known in Ukrainian history as Black Tuesday.

On 24 August (Independence Day of Ukraine) 1998, Berkut participated in dispersing the picketing of miners in front of the Luhansk "House of Soviets" (administration building of Luhansk regional government and legislation). The picketing of miners from Krasnodonvuhillia was caused by salary indebtedness for the last 2.5 years. At that time Luhansk Oblast was governed by Oleksandr Yefremov and Viktor Tikhonov.

In 2004 and 2005, Berkut teams participated in many actions of Leonid Kuchma's government against the opposition during the Orange Revolution. Former Ukrainian president Viktor Yanukovych has been accused, including by Amnesty International, of using Berkut to threaten, attack, and torture Ukrainian protesters. Upon coming to power, Yanukovych had reversed oversight measures established during the Yushchenko administration to curb Berkut abuse of citizens, whereupon the special force "upped its brutality."

==== Euromaidan ====
On 30 November 2013, Berkut units in Kyiv violently dispersed protesters during the Euromaidan protest movement, and were thereafter involved in numerous other instances of brutality attempting to suppress the movement. On 27 January 2014, the Ministry of Defense announced sharp pay raises for military personnel. The Cabinet of Ministers adopted a secret resolution to increase the size of the Berkut force sixfold to 30,000. They were given more power and a reserve fund was set aside for additional ammunition.

Former head of Security for the Ukrainian president, General Viktor Ivanovich Palivoda, stated in early February 2014 that those officers standing in the front lines against the protestors received pay bonuses. Further bonuses were awarded for capturing protesters including the recognition of the equivalent of additional years of service.

==== Citizen disenfranchisement ====
The Organization for Security and Cooperation in Europe confirmed witness accounts of voters being blocked from access to polls and being attacked along with local election officials who tried to frustrate the Berkut's practice of falsifying voters' ballots in favor of Yanukovych's Party of Regions candidates. Individual cases have been reported of citizens grouping together and fighting back against the Berkut in order to preserve election integrity and results.

==== Antisemitism ====
Bernard-Henri Lévy noted that in its last days before the end of the 2014 Ukrainian revolution and the Berkut's disbandment, on its website the group accused Euromaidan leaders of being Jewish; one such accused was Ihor Kolomoyskyi. Berkut had posted a picture with a superimposed Star of David and swastika in order to depict an alliance of Nazis and Jews against pro-Russians in Eastern Ukraine.

==== Specific incidents ====
Writing in Business Insider in February 2014, Harrison Jacobs noted: "The Berkut ... has had a long history of brutality, abuse, torture, and other measures in service of whatever political regime is in control of Ukraine." According to Ukraine political expert Taras Kuzio in November 2013, in recent years the force had been increasingly used to intimidate anti-government demonstrators and to influence the electoral process.

- 23–25 June 1995 – Assaulted Crimean Tatars near Sudak (Crimea) and helped criminals to escape angry crowd
- 18 July 1995, "Black Tuesday" – Prevented burial of Patriarch Volodymyr (Kyiv)
- 24 August 1998 (Independence Day) – Violently dispersed peaceful protest of coal miners (for a two-and-a-half-year lack of pay) in Luhansk (governor of Luhansk Oblast – Oleksandr Yefremov)
- November 2000 – March 2001, Ukraine without Kuchma – Protected government from angry crowd
- 19 August 2013 – Attacked Parliamentarians during the 2013 Kyiv political protests near city hall
- Beginning on 22 November 2013, attacked protesters of the Euromaidan
- 23 January 2014 – Kidnapped Alexandra Haylak, a 22-year-old volunteer of the Euromaidan medical service, stripped her of all identification, and left her in the woods near Vyshhorod.
- 23 January 2014 – Opposition member of Ukraine's parliament Andriy Parubiy reported that the Berkut was altering standard-issue stun grenades, making them killing devices by wrapping them with nails and other shrapnel and using them against Euromaidan protesters. Parubiy showed reporters samples of the altered weapons.
- On 23 January 2014, Berkut officers arrested Mykhailo Havryliuk, protester and Zaporozhian Cossack. In temperatures approaching −15 °C (5 °F), Berkut officers beat Havryliuk with blows to his head and torso, then stripped him naked and forced him to the ground. Whilst he was on the ground, Berkut officers put their feet on his head, as association football players would place their feet on a ball, and photographed themselves. A video was later uploaded to YouTube showed, in scenes reminiscent of the Abu Ghraib prisoner abuse scandal Berkut officers posing for photographs with the naked Havryliuk. In a further attempt to humiliate him, Berkut offices forced Havryliuk to hold an ice-axe and attempted to make him proclaim, "I love Berkut". The video went viral and, apart from making Havryliuk a symbol of Euromaidan, drew an apology from Interior Minister Vitaliy Zakharchenko. Havryliuk revealed at a press conference after the incident that the Berkut officers also cut a couple of strands of the traditional Cossack forelocks (oseledets) from his head.

=== Dissolution ===
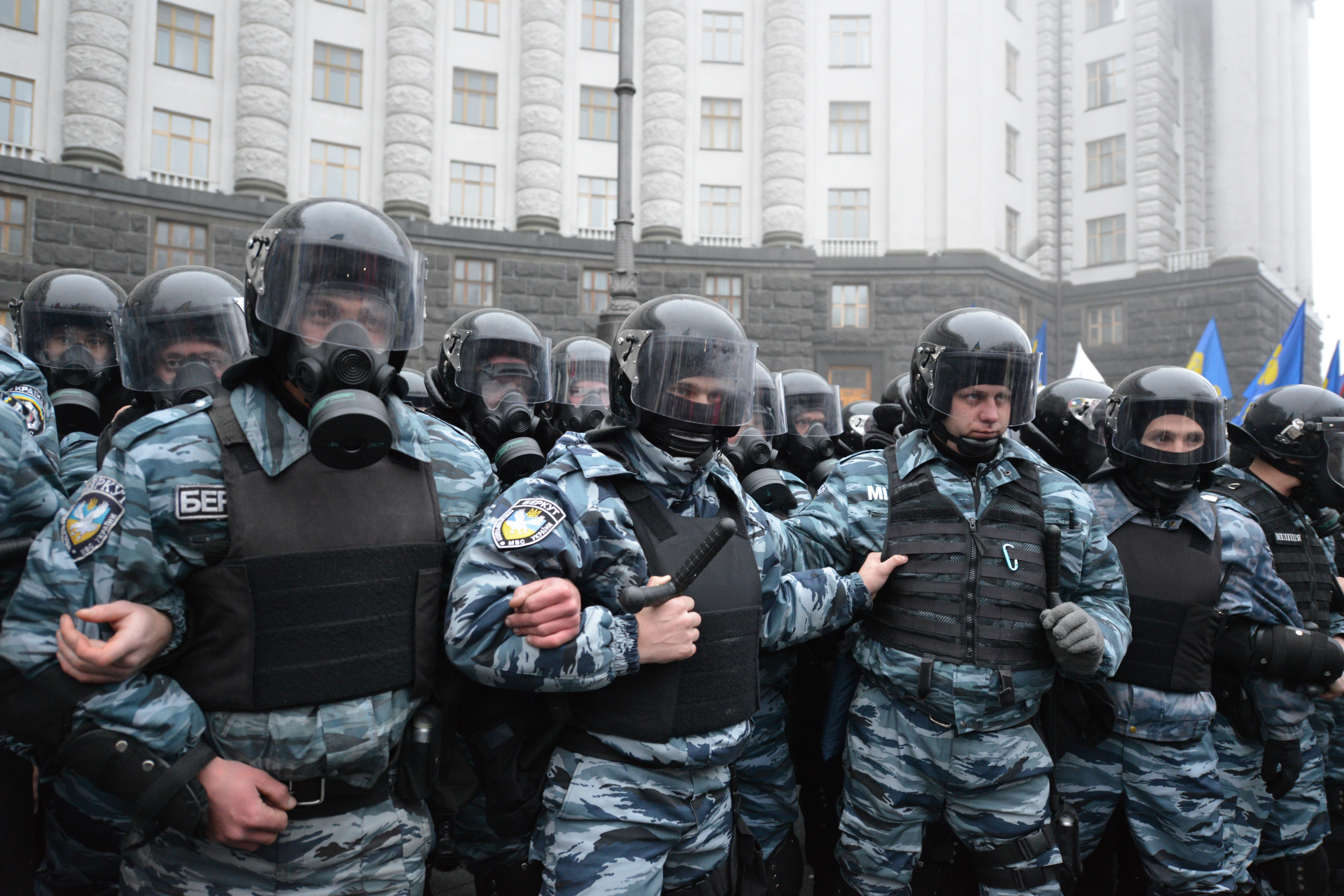
Berkut officers in riot gear forming a defensive line by the building of the Cabinet of Ministers in Kyiv during the 2013 Euromaidan protests.

On 25 February 2014, acting Ukrainian Interior Minister Arsen Avakov signed a decree on the dissolution of the Berkut, as by then the agency had become synonymous with police brutality for many pro-Euromaidan protesters and sympathizers. The Berkut was dissolved only four days after the opposition forces that had supported Euromaidan (including Avakov) had taken control of the Ukrainian government, and replaced with the restored National Guard of Ukraine on 13 March 2014. Many pro-Ukrainian Berkut servicemen opted to join the National Guard of Ukraine, which is partly composed of former Euromaidan activists, and began fighting alongside the regular Ukrainian Army against pro-Russian separatists in the concurrent War in Donbas.

== Crimean Berkut ==
=== History ===
Five days before the dissolution of Berkut by the Ukrainian government, Russia began annexation of the Crimean peninsula and seizing control of the Autonomous Republic of Crimea and Sevastopol. A sizeable Berkut unit had been stationed in Crimea, and took part in maintaining public order during the 2014 Ukrainian revolution and Euromaidan. Media and Euromaidan demonstrators had accused Berkut of being excessively violent during these events.

On 26 February 2014, the newly appointed Russian de facto mayor of Sevastopol, Aleksei Chaly, announced the formation of a new Berkut special police force "in order to maintain public order in Sevastopol, to prevent unlawful acts of provocation, riots and looting." Chaly then offered asylum to former Berkut troops in Ukraine, saying "These people adequately fulfilled their duty to the country, have shown themselves to be real men, and are now abandoned to the mercy of this rabid pack of Nazis. For faithful service, today criminal cases are brought against them. At this difficult time our city needs decent men who could form the basis of self-defense groups, and in the future the municipal police. We are ready to provide for them if they join us in our struggle, and to offer safety to their families.”

On 28 February Russia started to issue pro-Russian Berkut members Russian passports in the Crimean city of Simferopol. By 21 March 2014, the date the Republic of Crimea and Sevastopol were granted accession as federal subjects of Russia as a result of the referendum in Crimea, the Berkut units based in the territory were still active despite the agency being dissolved. Three days later, Russia announced that the Berkut units in the Republic of Crimea and Sevastopol would preserve their name and would be incorporated into the Russian Ministry of Internal Affairs.

In June 2014, an armed pro-Russian separatist group fighting in Donetsk and Luhansk in the war in Donbas called the Donbass Veterans' Union claimed to be composed of "more than 1000" former Berkut officers and other former servicemen and police officers.

On 5 April 2016, Berkut was transferred from the Russian Ministry of Internal Affairs to the newly created National Guard of Russia.

=== Organization ===
The Crimean Berkut unit has 400 members with subunits in Kerch and Yalta.

== Belarus ==
At the request of Radio Free Europe/Radio Liberty in 2014 after the publication on the website of the newspaper Salidarnasts about the fact that former employees of the Ukrainian Berkut are employed in the Belarusian OMON, the press secretary of the Ministry of Internal Affairs Konstantin Shalkevich responded negatively, since "the Ministry of Internal Affairs does not comment on low-quality essays on a free topic posted on the Internet." Nevertheless, in 2020, the ex-employees of the disbanded "Berkut" were identified in the ranks of OMON. In 2021 Novy Chas identified even more such personalities.

== See also ==
- Internal Troops of Ukraine
- Internal Troops of Russia
- National Guard of Russia
