= Vitalii Lazorkin =

Ukrainian serviceman, scientist, public figure (1945–2021)

- Віталій Лазоркін
- Born: Віталій Ілліч Лазоркін; 9 July 1945
- Died: 26 December 2021 (aged 76)
- Burial place: Yaniv Cemetery, Lviv, Ukraine
- Alma mater: Kolomyia College of Mechanical Wood Processing, Kyiv Higher Engineering Radio Technical School of Air Defense, Institute of International Relations of Taras Shevchenko National University of Kyiv
- Military career
- Allegiance: Ukraine
- Branch: Armed Forces of Ukraine
- Service years: 1969–1996
- Rank: Colonel

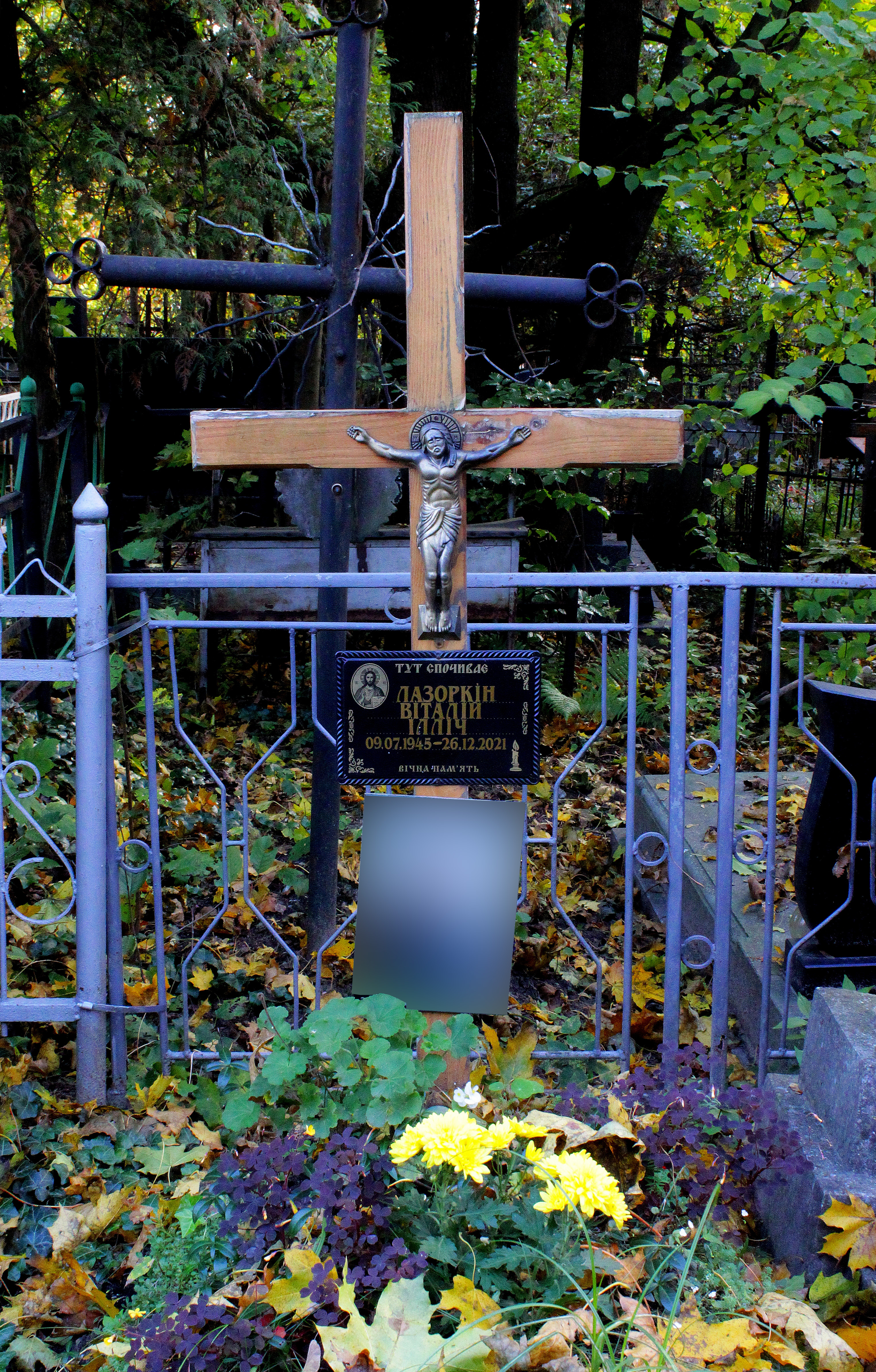
Vitalii Lazorkin's grave at the Yaniv cemetery

Vitalii Illich Lazorkin (Ukrainian: Віталій Ілліч Лазоркін; 9 July 1945, Uglich – 26 December 2021, Lviv) was a Ukrainian serviceman, scientist, public figure, colonel of the Armed Forces of Ukraine.

One of the founders and first officers of the Armed Forces of Ukraine, the Union of Officers of Ukraine, Deputy Chairman of the UOU. Member of the Lviv Oblast Council (1990). Collaborated with Viacheslav Chornovil and Stepan Khmara.

== Biography ==
Vitalii Lazorkin was born on 9 July 1945 in Uhlychi. His father was a political prisoner.

Lazorkin graduated from the Kolomyia College of Mechanical Wood Processing (1963, specialty – mechanical technician), the Kyiv Higher Engineering Radio Technical School of Air Defense (1969, specialty – radio electronics engineer) and the Diplomatic and Consular Service Course at the Institute of International Relations of Taras Shevchenko National University of Kyiv (1993, specialty – military attaché).

During the 1950s and 1960s, he worked as a turner, mechanic, and design technician at enterprises in Ivano-Frankivsk and Lviv.

Since 2020, the National Museum of the History of Ukraine has been keeping unique materials of Colonel Lazorkin.

Died on 26 December 2021 in Lviv. The funeral took place on 31 December 2021 at the Saints Peter and Paul Garrison Church. Buried at the Yaniv Cemetery.

=== Military service ===
==== USSR ====
Since 1969, he has been in the Soviet Army. He was on combat duty in the Missile Attack Warning System of the Missile and Space Defense Troops of the USSR Air Defense Forces in the Arctic and Latvia, in the 1st Radio Engineering Brigade of the 28th Air Defense Corps.

In 1977–1987 he was an officer, senior officer of the command and control of troops and weapons of the Air Defense of the Carpathian Military District (Lviv).

1987–1991 – Senior Lecturer, Head of the Radar Series of the Joint Military Department of the Lviv Polytechnic Institute. Member of the Academic Council of the Radio Engineering Faculty of Lviv Polytechnic.

In 1990, he became the author of the "Concept of Creation of the Armed Forces of Ukraine", which was published in the materials of the 1st session of the Grand Council of the People's Movement of Ukraine. He was elected head of the secretariat of the Lviv Public Committee for the Revival of the Ukrainian National Army.

In April 1991, he became a member of the military board of the People's Movement of Ukraine and the organizing committee for the preparation and holding of the First Congress of Ukrainian Officers, which founded the Union of Officers of Ukraine. At that time, Colonel Lazorkin was elected deputy chairman of the organization. He was repeatedly elected to the governing bodies of the UOU.

In July 1991, he was appointed to the Commission under the Presidium of the Supreme Soviet of the Ukrainian SSR to consider appeals from citizens of the republic on the death and injury of servicemen during military service.

Organizer of the working group on the creation of the Ministry of Defense of Ukraine.

==== Ukraine ====
On 6 September 1991, Colonel Lazorkin submitted to the Verkhovna Rada Commission on Security and Defense his own draft laws "On the Defense of Ukraine" and "On the Armed Forces of Ukraine", which were adopted by the Verkhovna Rada on 6 December 1991.

In September 1991, he was appointed as a representative of Ukraine in the interstate working group on military issues under the Committee on Security and Defense of the Supreme Soviet of the USSR. He helped to remove the issue of the military doctrine of the renewed USSR from the interstate level.

In October 1991, he was a member of the initiative group for the creation of the Naval Forces of the Armed Forces of Ukraine. In February–March 1992, in Sevastopol, he held meetings with the Commander of the Black Sea Fleet, Admiral Igor Kasatonov, on the transfer of the Black Sea Fleet to the Armed Forces of Ukraine. He was a member of the bilateral working group in the negotiations between Ukraine and the Russian Federation on the division of the Black Sea Fleet, where he defended the position of transferring all forces stationed in Ukraine to the Black Sea Fleet.

On 23 December 1991, he was appointed head of the group of consultants to the Minister of Defense of Ukraine Kostiantyn Morozov and was also appointed to the Higher Attestation Commission of the Ministry of Defense.

On 18 January 1992, on behalf of the executive committee of the Union of Officers of Ukraine, he administered the military oath of allegiance to the Ukrainian people to the reserve officers of the Kyiv garrison at the square near St. Sophia Cathedral. In the same year, he authored the Concept for the Development of Ukraine's Air Defense.

In 1993–1996, he served as Deputy Head of Research at the Central Research Institute of the Ministry of Defense of Ukraine.

=== Public activity ===
In 1996–1997, he headed the Department of International Informatization Support at the National Agency for Informatization under the President of Ukraine.

In 1998–1999, he was an active participant in the creation of the State Search and Rescue Service on water bodies. Until 2003, he was Deputy Head – Head of the Department for Emergency Response to Water Bodies.

In January 1991, on the recommendation of the head of the Lviv Oblast Council, Viacheslav Chornovil, the staff of the Radio Engineering Faculty of Lviv Polytechnic nominated Colonel Lazorkin as a candidate for deputy of the Lviv Regional Council. Student Georgiy Gongadze was his proxy. In March 1991, he was elected as a deputy of the said council.

He was an active participant in the Orange Revolution and the Revolution of Dignity.

In 2004, he founded the Public Institute for Strategic Research and Implementation of Perspective Programs "Perspective". Later he worked in the National Rescue Committee.

In 2018, he was re-elected Deputy Chairman of the National Security Council.

=== Scientific activity ===
Author of more than 50 published scientific papers, as well as many draft laws, the Military Doctrine of Ukraine, and the Concept of Military Reform.
