= Sofiiska Square =

Square in central Old Kyiv, Ukraine

- Public square
- {{{other_names}}}
- Софійська площа
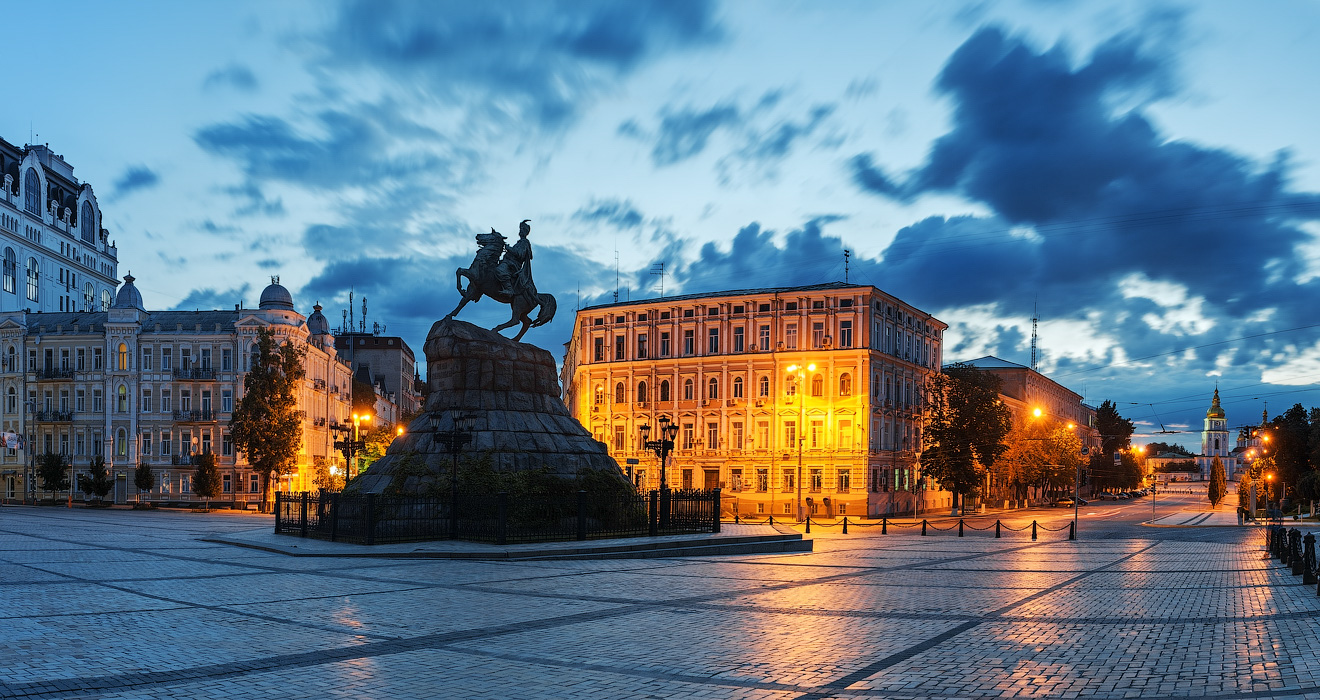
- Features: Saint Sophia Cathedral; Bohdan Khmelnytsky Monument
- Location: Old Kyiv, Shevchenkivskyi District, Kyiv, Ukraine
- Interactive map of Sofiiska Square
- Coordinates: 50.4534°N 30.5161°E

Sofiiska Square, also translated as Sophia Square, (Ukrainian: Софійська площа, romanized: Sofiiska ploshcha) is a square in central Old Kyiv, Ukraine. Located in the Shevchenkivskyi District of Kyiv, the square lies in front of Saint Sophia Cathedral. It is bordered by Volodymyrska Street, and features a monument of Bohdan Khmelnytsky.

The city's Christmas and New Year's festivities were held in Sofiiska Square from 2014 onwards, after they were moved from Maidan Nezalezhnosti due to the events of Euromaidan. Since the Russian invasion of Ukraine in 2022, many of the festivities have been indefinitely suspended.

== Description and location ==
Sofiiska Square is a square in central Old Kyiv, Ukraine, located in the Shevchenkivskyi District of Kyiv, the square is in front of Saint Sophia Cathedral. It is surrounded by Volodymyrska Street, Volodymyrska Proezd, Alla Tarasova Street, Sofia Street, and Rylsky Lane.

=== Bohdan Khmelnytsky Monument ===
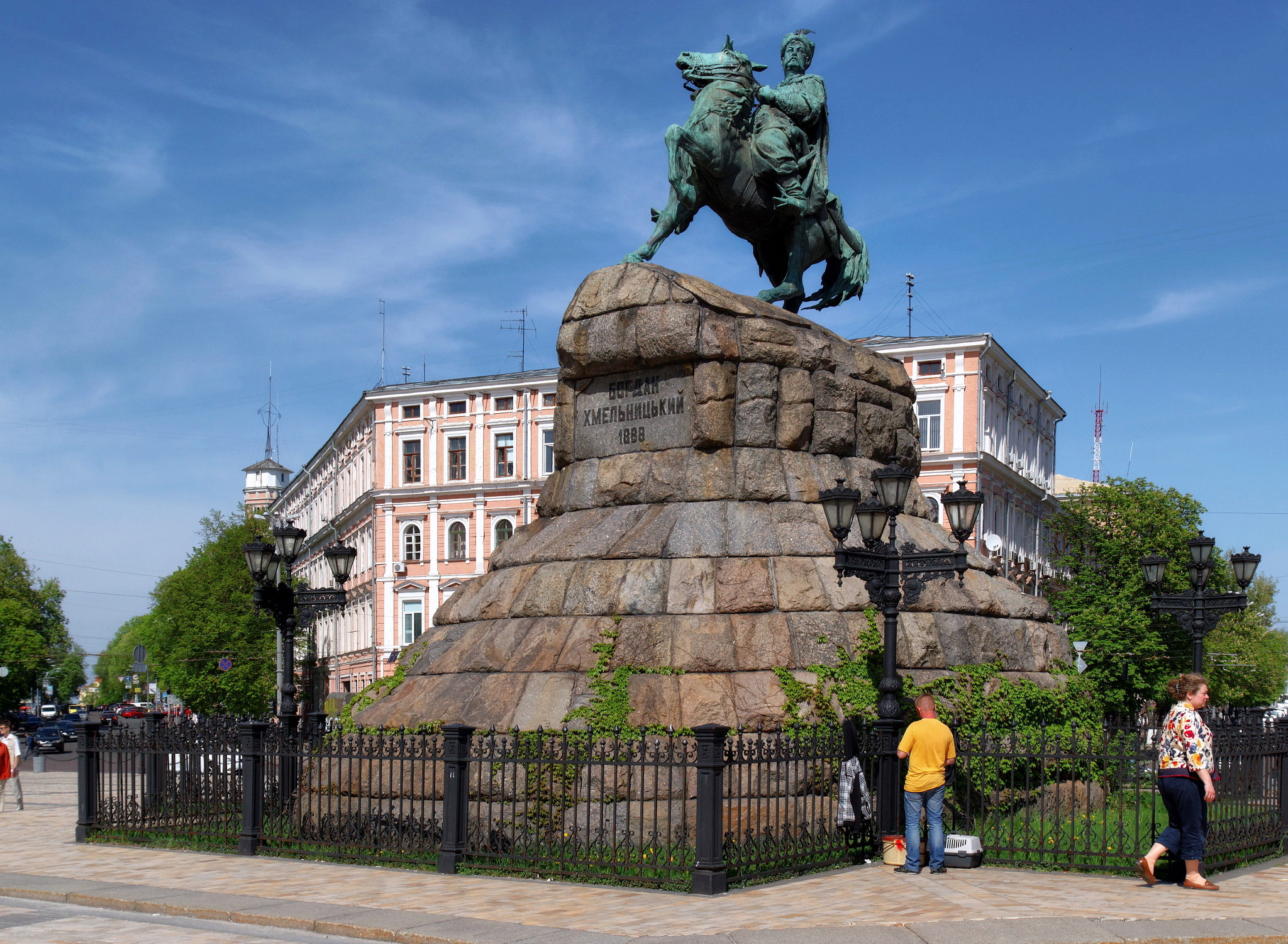
The Bohdan Khmelnytsky Monument in 2013

In the centre of Sofiiska Square is the monument of Bohdan Khmelnytsky, dedicated to Bohdan Khmelnytsky, the first Hetman of the Zaporizhian Host. Consecrated in 1888 as part of the celebration of the 900th anniversary of the Christianization of Kievan Rus', the monument is one of the oldest sculptural monuments in Kyiv. It is a dominating feature of Sofiiska Square and one of the city's symbols.

== History ==
In 1036, Yaroslav the Wise defeated the Pechenegs on the site of Sofiiska Square. The square was formed on the "field outside the city" after the construction of St Sophia Cathedral (1036), when it was known as Starokyivska Square.

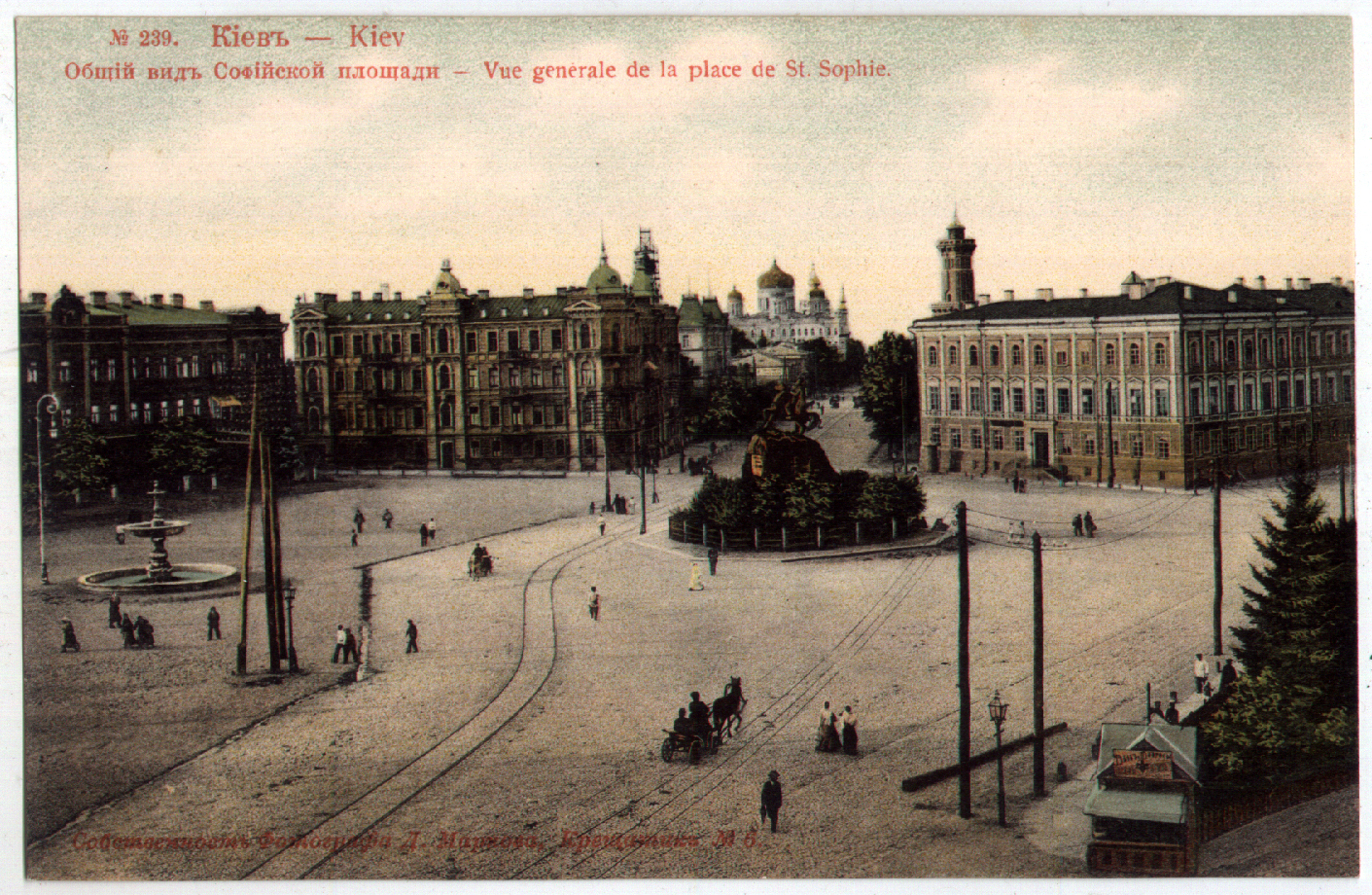
A 1910 postcard of the square

Over time the area in the vicinity of the square was built up, and at the beginning of the 19th century a monastery stable yard existed on the site. In around 1840, a square was established on the site of the former yard. After the construction of the Provincial Presence Building (1854–1857), the square was separated from the neighbouring Saint Michael's Square and given its current boundaries In 1869, the new official name of the square, Sofiyevskaya, was announced in the pro-Russification newspaper Kievlyanin.

In 1921, Sofiiska Square was renamed The Square of the Red Heroes of Perekop, in honour of the victory of the Red Army over the Army of Wrangel near Perekop in 1920. In 1926, the name was amended to Heroes of Perekop Square. During the German occupation (1941–1943), the official name was Sophia Square. In 1944, it was named Bohdan Khmelnytskyi Square. The name of the square was reverted to its current form in 1993.

=== Post-independence ===
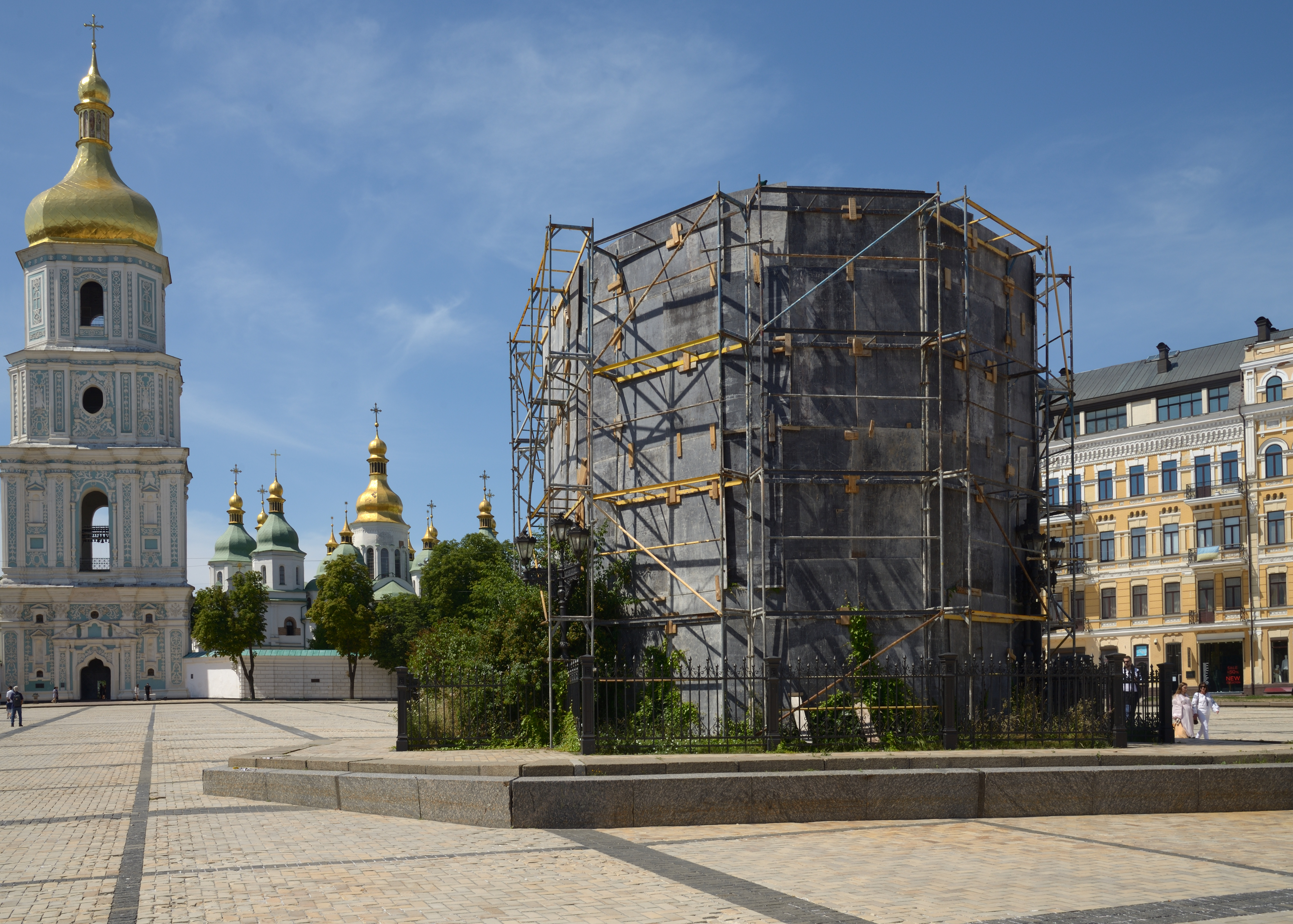
A view of the square in July 2022, showing measures taken to protect the Bohdan Khmelnytsky Monument from bomb or missile damage

In 2014, Kyiv's annual Christmas and New Year's festivities were moved from Maidan Nezalezhnosti to Sofiiska Square, following the events of the Euromaidan. Since the Russian invasion of Ukraine in 2022, many of these festivities have been indefinitely suspended.

== Sources ==
- Udovik, Sergeĭ Leonidovich (2004). Kyiv. Kyiv, Ukraine: Vakler. ISBN 9789665430896.
