= Alexander G. Obukhov =

Alexander G. Obukhov, Ph.D.
- Education: Bogomoletz Institute of Physiology (PhD)
- Known for: Cationic channels activated by extracellular ATP in rat sensory neurons Direct activation of human TRPC6 and TRPC3 channels by diacylglycerol Receptor-mediated Regulation of the Nonselective Cation Channels TRPC4 and TRPC5* Cloning and Functional Expression of a Human Ca2+-Permeable Cation Channel Activated by Calcium Store Depletion
- Scientific career
- Fields: Ion Channels, Neurophysiology, Voltage-gated calcium channels, Atherosclerosis, Vascular disease, TRPC channels
- Workplaces: Indiana University School of Medicine, Indianapolis, IN, USA (2006-present) New Jersey Medical School, University of Medicine and Dentistry of New Jersey, Newark, NJ, USA (1999-2006) The Institute of Pharmacology, Free University Berlin, Berlin, Germany (1993-1999) A.A. Bogomolets Institute of Physiology, Kyiv, Ukraine (1985-1992)
- Academic advisors: Alexander Krayevsky, Oleg Krishtal, Günter Schultz
- Website: https://medicine.iu.edu/faculty/17979/obukhov-alexander

Alexander G. Obukhov is an American researcher who specializes in ion channels, molecular physiology, neuroscience, neurophysiology, and vascular disease. His most notable research articles were published in Nature, Journal of Biological Chemistry, EMBO Journal, Journal of Cell Biology, Proceedings of the National Academy of Sciences of the United States of America, and Neuron.

== Education ==
Obukhov obtained a Degree of Chemist/Teacher from Samara State University (Samara, USSR) in 1983. He then studied Electrophysiology at the Bogomolets Institute of Physiology (Kyiv, Ukraine) and earned a Ph.D. Degree in 1988. Obukhov later pursued Fellowships in Electrophysiology and Molecular Biology, first at the Bogomolets Institute of Physiology and later at Institut für Pharmakologie, Freie Universität Berlin (Berlin, Germany).

== Career ==
Obukhov started his research career in 1983 in the laboratory of Dr. Alexander A. Krayevsky at the Institute of Molecular Biology of the Academy of Sciences of the Soviet Union (Moscow, USSR) where he was involved in the chemical synthesis of unnatural nucleoside triphosphates. In 1985, he joined the laboratory of Dr. Oleg A. Krishtal at the Bogomoletz Institute of Physiology, where he learned the advanced electrophysiological patch clamp technique and started investigating the physiological effects of adenosine triphosphate (ATP) analogs synthesized by him on the activity of sensory nodose ganglion (a vagus nerve ganglion) neurons, which express P2X receptor-channels activated by ATP. While working in the Krishtal's laboratory, Obukhov characterized the single-channel properties of an individual neuronal ATP-gated (P2X) receptor channel protein in sensory neurons and determined the pharmacological properties of the neuronal ATP-gated (P2X) receptor channel. After earning his PhD degree in 1988, he continued his work at the Bogomolets Institute of Physiology until 1992. In 1992, he was awarded the Humboldt Research Fellowship from the Alexander von Humboldt Foundation (Bonn, Germany) to conduct research at a German University, and this allowed him to join the laboratory of Dr. Günter Schultz at the Institut für Pharmakologie of Freien Universität Berlin (Berlin, Germany), where he studied the biophysical properties of just cloned Transient Receptor Potential (TRP) Channels. In the laboratory of Dr. Schultz, Obukhov continued mastering his skills as an Electrophysiologist and also started learning Pharmacology and Molecular Biology. After completing the Humboldt Fellowship at the end of 1994, Obukhov continued his research on TRP channels in the laboratory of Dr. Schultz until 1999. While working in the Schultz laboratory, Obukhov, with his colleagues, provided the first evidence that TRP proteins are ion channels by recording their single-channel activity. During this period, Obukhov published four of his most cited academic publications. In 1999, Dr. Obukhov moved to the USA, where he initially worked at New Jersey Medical School of the University of Medicine and Dentistry of NJ (Newark, NJ) as an Instructor and then as a Research Assistant Professor. In 2006, Obukhov moved to Indianapolis, Indiana, USA, to work for the Indiana University School of Medicine-Indianapolis as an Assistant Professor and then as an Associate Professor. The laboratory of Dr. Obukhov continues investigating the molecular physiology of TRP channels.He was awarded the Trustees Teaching Award there. And then later on in 2016 he was awarded AMerican Heart Association Research Adminstraion Voluntneer Recognition Award. Additionally, Dr. Obukhov's laboratory studies the molecular mechanisms of metabolic syndrome-associated atherosclerosis progression. Obukhov's research projects also concern multiple other fields, including traumatic brain injury, pain, uterine contraction physiology, endothelial dysfunction, and atherosclerosis.

== Teaching ==
Obukhov teaches Physiology and Electrophysiology-related topics at the Indiana University School of Medicine.

== Professional affiliations ==
Obukhov is a professional member of the American Heart Association. Obukhov is also on the editorial board of numerous scientific publications including Cells, Scientific Reports, PLOS One, and Frontiers in Physiology.
