= Akademika Bohomoltsia Street =

Street in Kyiv, Ukraine

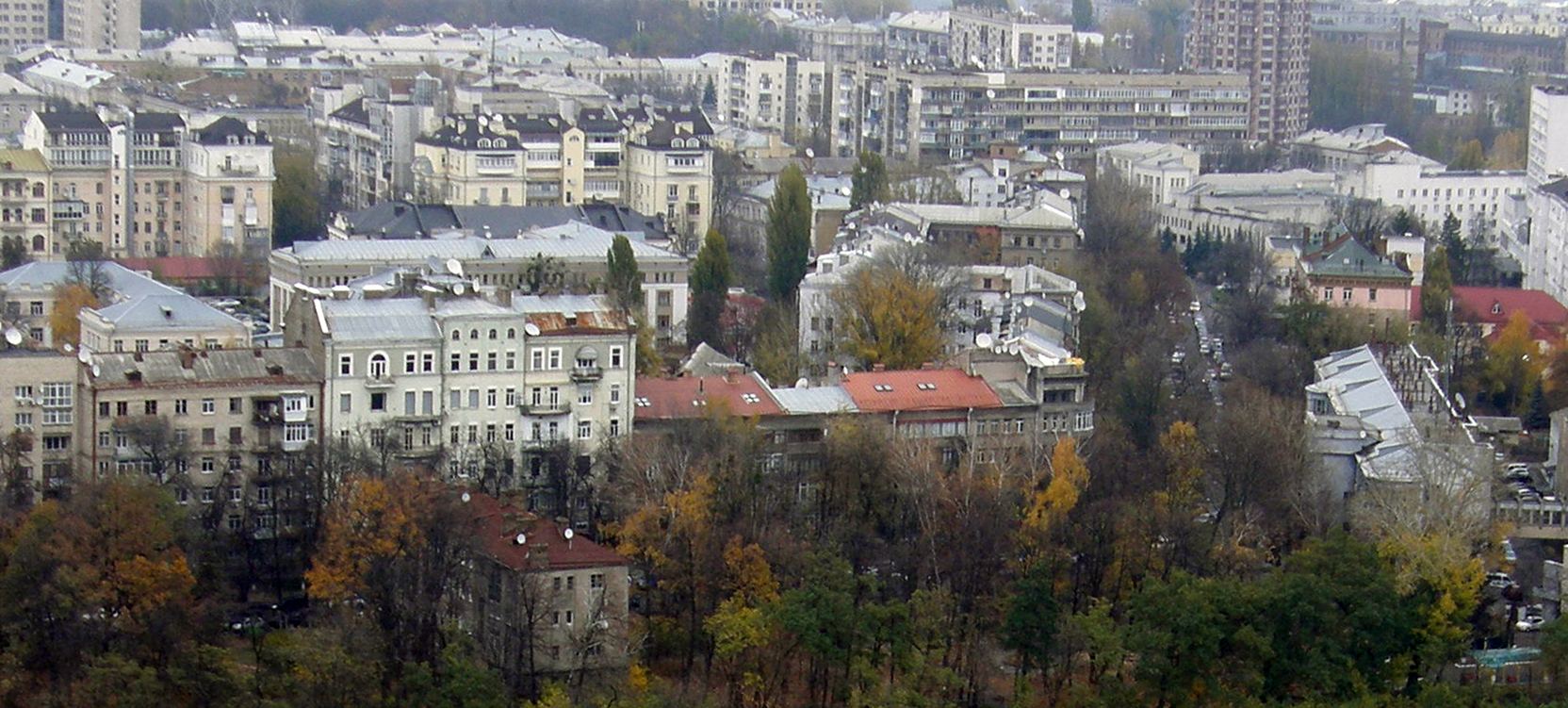
- Akademika Bohomoltsia Street highlighted in red
- Native name: Вулиця Академіка Богомольця (Ukrainian)
- Length: 0.5 km (0.31 mi)
- Location: Pecherskyi District, Lypky, Kyiv, Ukraine
- West end: Shovkovychna Street
- East end: Pylypa Orlyka Street

Akademika Bohomoltsia Street (Ukrainian: Вулиця Академіка Богомольця, romanized: Vulytsia Akademika Bohomoltsia, lit. 'Academician Bohomolets Street') is a street located in the Pecherskyi District, in the Lypky neighborhood of Kyiv. It runs from Shovkovychna Street to Pylyp Orlyk Street.

== History ==
Akademika Bohomoltsia Street originated in the 1830s and 1840s under the name Esplanadna Street (from the esplanade of the New Pechersk Fortress located next to it). In 1869, it was renamed Vynogradna (Russian: Выноградная) (from the vineyard planted here in the 18th century). At different times, the neighboring streets of Pylypa Orlyka and Lipskyi Lane had the same name. Nowadays, Vynohradnyi Lane exists next to Akademika Bogomoletsa Street. During the German occupation of the city in 1942–1943, the street was known as Waragerstrasse (German: Warager Street, Ukrainian: Varyazka) and Vynogradna.

The street received its modern name in 1946, in honor of the Ukrainian physiologist Aleksandr Bogomolets.

== Notable buildings ==
The Ministry of Internal Affairs is located in Akademika Bohomoltsia Street. The Bogomoletz Institute of Physiology is also located in this street and is named after Alexander Bogomolets.
