= Volodymyrska Street =

Street in Kyiv, Ukraine

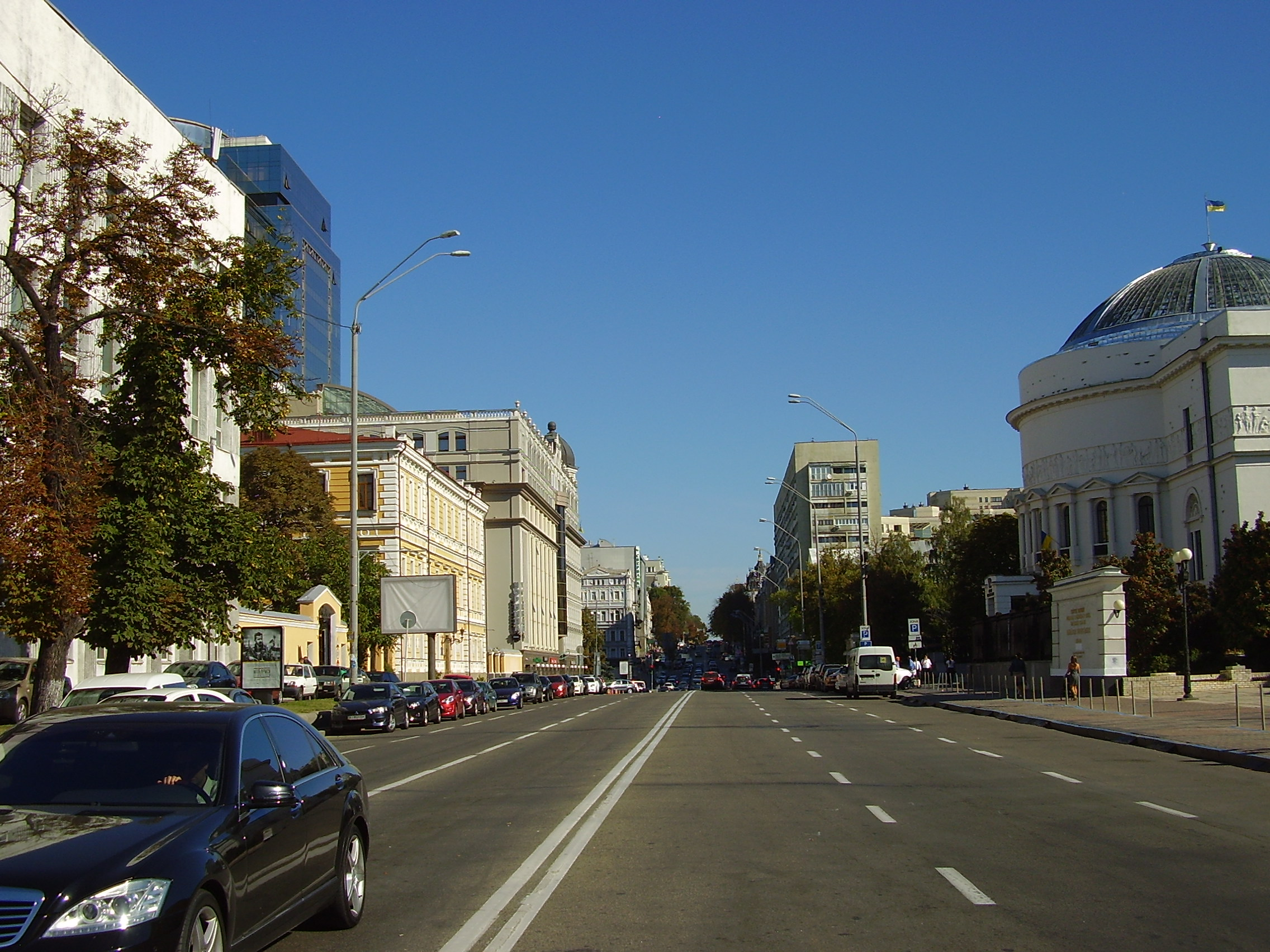
- View from Taras Shevchenko Boulevard towards Sophia Square, with Teacher's House on the right
- Native name: вулиця Володимирська (Ukrainian)
- Former names: Andriivska, Sofiivska, Zolota, Universytetska (till 1830s); Desiatynna, Nyznio-Volodymyrska (two streets, 1869–1901); Velyka Volodymyrska (1830s–1869, 1901–1922, 1942–1943); Korolenko (1922–1942)
- Namesake: Vladimir the Great
- Length: 2,900 m (9,500 ft)
- Location: Old Kyiv, Nova Zabudova neighborhoods, Shevchenkivskyi and Holosiivskyi districts, Kyiv, Ukraine
- Postal code: 01001, 01030, 01033, 01601
- Nearest metro station: Zoloti Vorota; Teatralna; Universytet; Ploshcha Lva Tolstoho; Olimpiiska
- Coordinates: 50°26′56.2″N 30°30′52.3″E
- North end: Andriivskyi Descent and Desiatynna Street
- Major junctions: Velyka Zhytomyrska Street; Sofiivska Square; Yaroslaviv Val Street and Prorizna Street; Bohdan Khmelnytsky Street; Taras Shevchenko Boulevard; Leo Tolstoy Street; Saksahansky Street; Zhylianska Street
- South end: Korolenkivska Street

Immovable Monument of Local Significance of Ukraine
- Official name: Вулиця Володимирська та вулиця Терещенківська (Volodymyrska Street and Tereshchenkivska Street)
- Type: Urban Planning
- Reference no.: 926-Кв

Volodymyrska Street (Ukrainian: вулиця Володимирська, romanized: vulytsia Volodymyrska) is a street in the center of Kyiv, the capital of Ukraine, which is named after the prince of Kievan Rus' Vladimir the Great. It is one of the oldest streets in the city, and arguably among the oldest constantly inhabited residential street in Europe. There are many educational, culture and government institutions, as well as historical monuments, on this street. Four buildings from Volodymyrska Street are depicted on reverses of Ukrainian hryvnia banknotes (Saint Sophia's Cathedral on 2 hryvnias, Tsentralna Rada building on 50 hryvnias, Red University Building on 100 hryvnias and building of the Presidium of the National Academy of Sciences of Ukraine on 1000 hryvnias).

== History ==
=== 10th to 18th centuries ===
Volodymyrska Street is one of the oldest in Kyiv. The part of the street between Church of the Tithes and Sofiyska Gate appeared not later than the end of the 10th century. After construction of Saint Sophia's Cathedral at the beginning of the 11th century and Golden Gate around 1037, the street was enlarged to reach both of them and became the main street of the city, which was going through the City of Volodymyr and the City of Yaroslav, which are the oldest parts of Kyiv. Also Irynynsky Church, Georgivsky Cathedral and St. Theodore Monastery were constructed on the street, as well as houses for both the nobility and usual people.

After Kyiv was ruined during Mongol invasion of Kyivan Rus', the street remained in ruins long after. In the 17th century, Saint Sophia's Cathedral was reconstructed and a chapel was built on the place, where Church of the Tithes was. The upper half of Volodymyrska Street became a part of Old Kyiv Fortress. After a long break, at the end of the 18th century, intensive construction started on the part of the street below the Golden Gate. The remains of Kievan Rus' defence walls and Old Kyiv Fortress were demolished.

=== 19th century ===
After expansion of Kyiv in the 1830s the street was expanded far south. In 1837–1842 Red University Building was constructed. From this moment the modern look of the street started to appear. Several 1–2 floor buildings were constructed, followed by 3–5 buildings. Many hotels and administrative, community and residential buildings were constructed. On the place where remains of Irynynsky Church were found, the St. Irene Column was erected from the ancient stone, which stood till the 1930s. At the end of the 19th century sett was put on the street, gas and later electric lighting appeared. In 1895 the tram line was constructed on the street.

=== 20th century ===
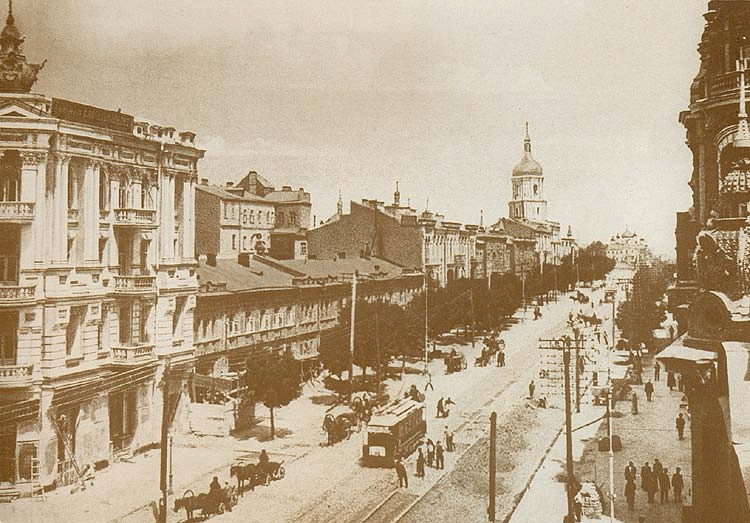
Volodymyrska Street at the beginning of the 20th century.

At the beginning of the 20th century, the new city theatre was constructed to replace the old one, which suffered from fire. A revenue house on the corner with Prorizna Street was also built, which is now a valuable place of interest in Kyiv; Pedagogical museum building, which will be the seat of the Central Council of Ukraine; Olgynska gymnasium building, which is now the seat of Presidium of the National Academy of Sciences of Ukraine; zemstvo building, which is now the seat of the Security Service of Ukraine.

There were no major constructions on the street during the rest of the century, apart from construction of the building for the National Museum of the History of Ukraine. Nowadays, Volodymyrska street is one of the most important streets in Kyiv. It is also a very important tourist site due to historical monuments of the 11th to 19th centuries, including an archaeological complex on Starokyivska Hill at the top of the street.

== Places of interest on the street ==
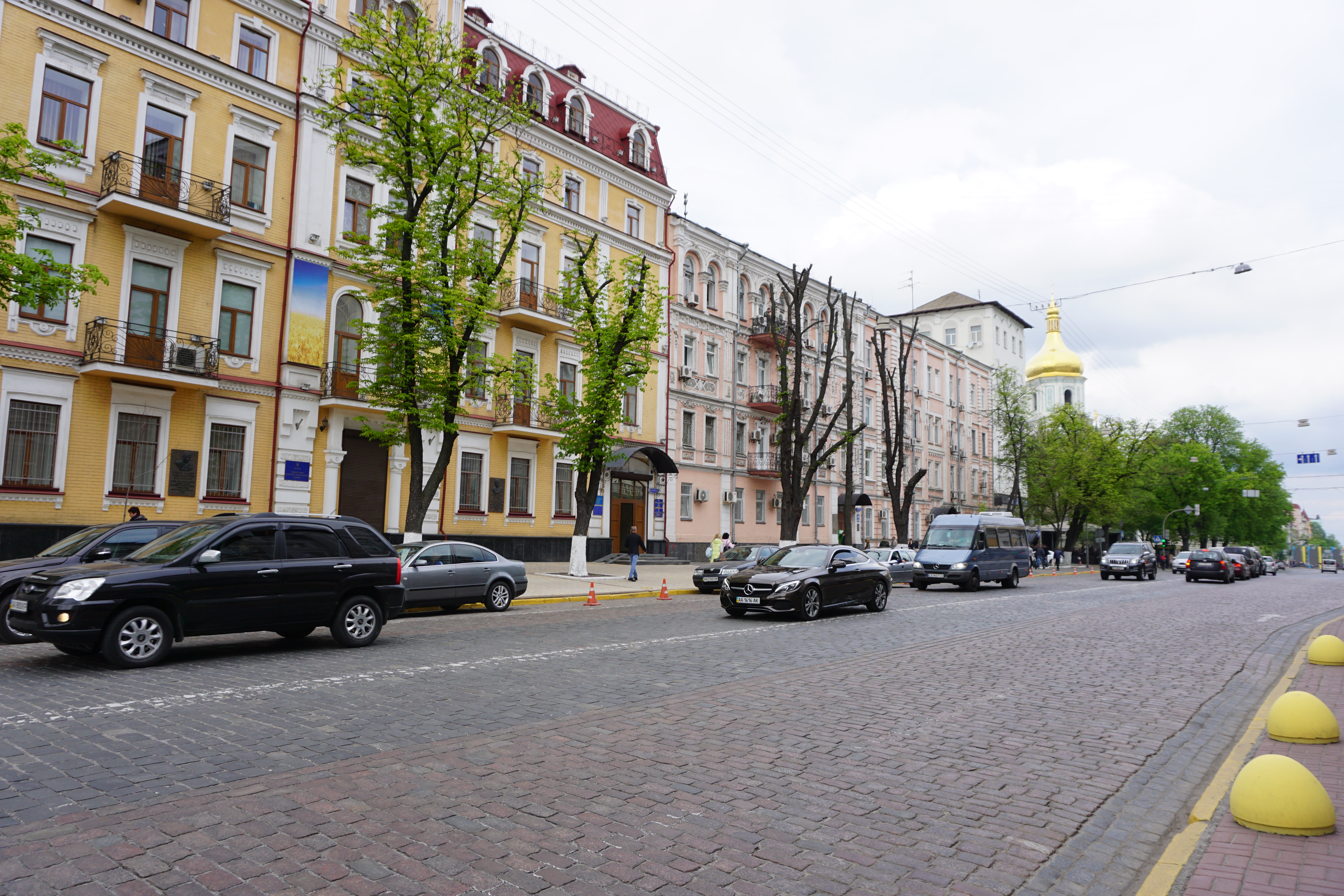
Same location as above in modern times

Notable cultural and historical monuments, institutions on the street from north to south:

- St Andrew's Church
- National Museum of the History of Ukraine
- Remains of the Church of the Tithes
- Embassy of Uzbekistan in Kyiv
- Kyiv department of the State Emergency Service of Ukraine
- Kyiv department of the National Police of Ukraine
- Court of Appeal of Kyiv Oblast
- Bohdan Khmelnytsky Monument
- Saint Sophia Cathedral
- Security Service of Ukraine
- State Border Guard Service of Ukraine
- Golden Gate
- Embassy of Armenia in Kyiv
- National Opera of Ukraine
- Leonardo Business Center
- Presidium of the National Academy of Sciences of Ukraine
- Teacher's House (former building of Central Council of Ukraine)
- Maksymovych Scientific Library
- Red University Building of the Taras Shevchenko National University of Kyiv
- Division of the Vernadsky National Library of Ukraine
- Taras Shevchenko Park
- Administration of the Taras Shevchenko National University of Kyiv
- National University of Food Technologies
- European Union delegation to Ukraine

== People ==
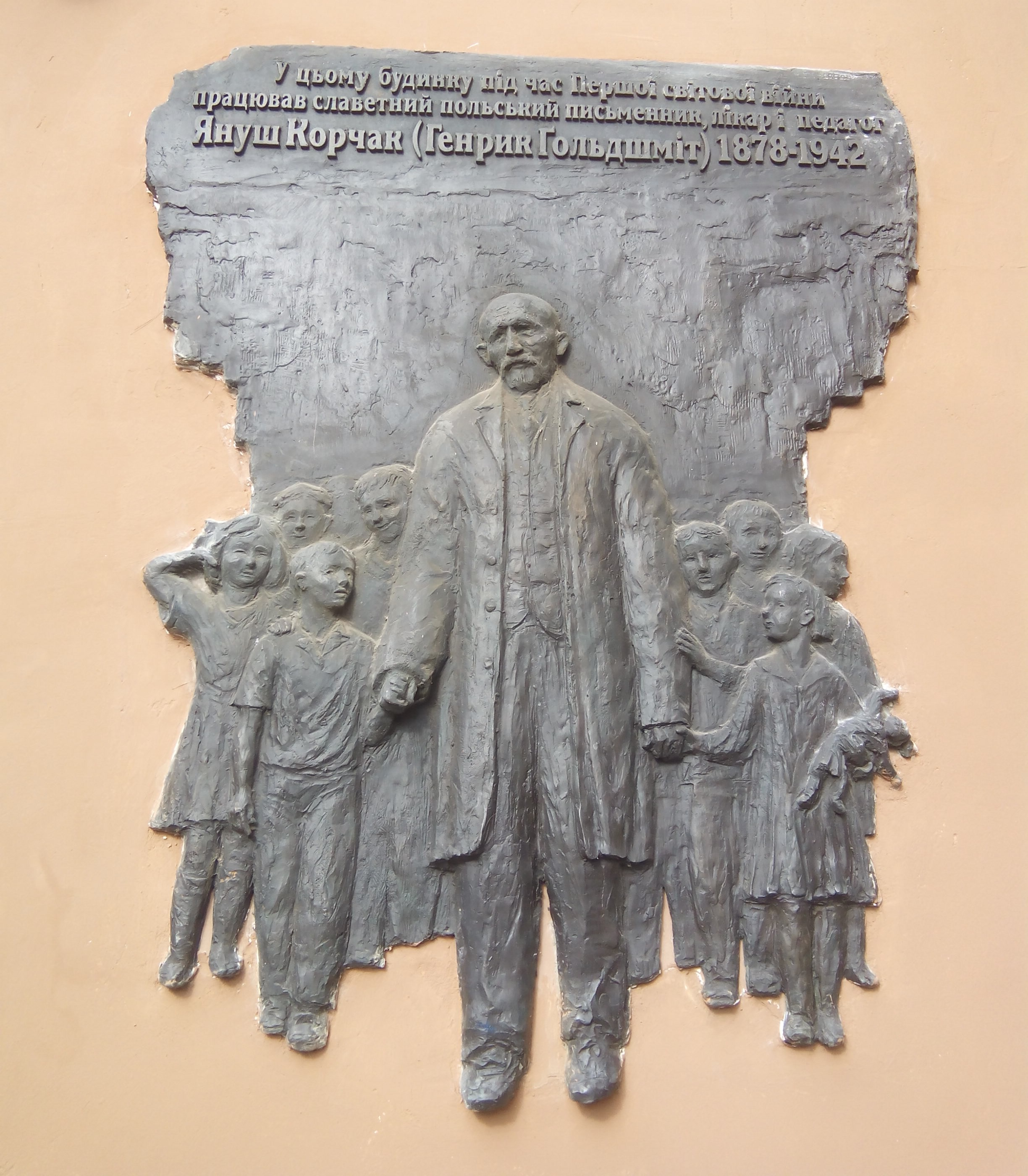
Memorial plaque to the Polish writer Janusz Korczak at Volodymyrska Street, 49a.

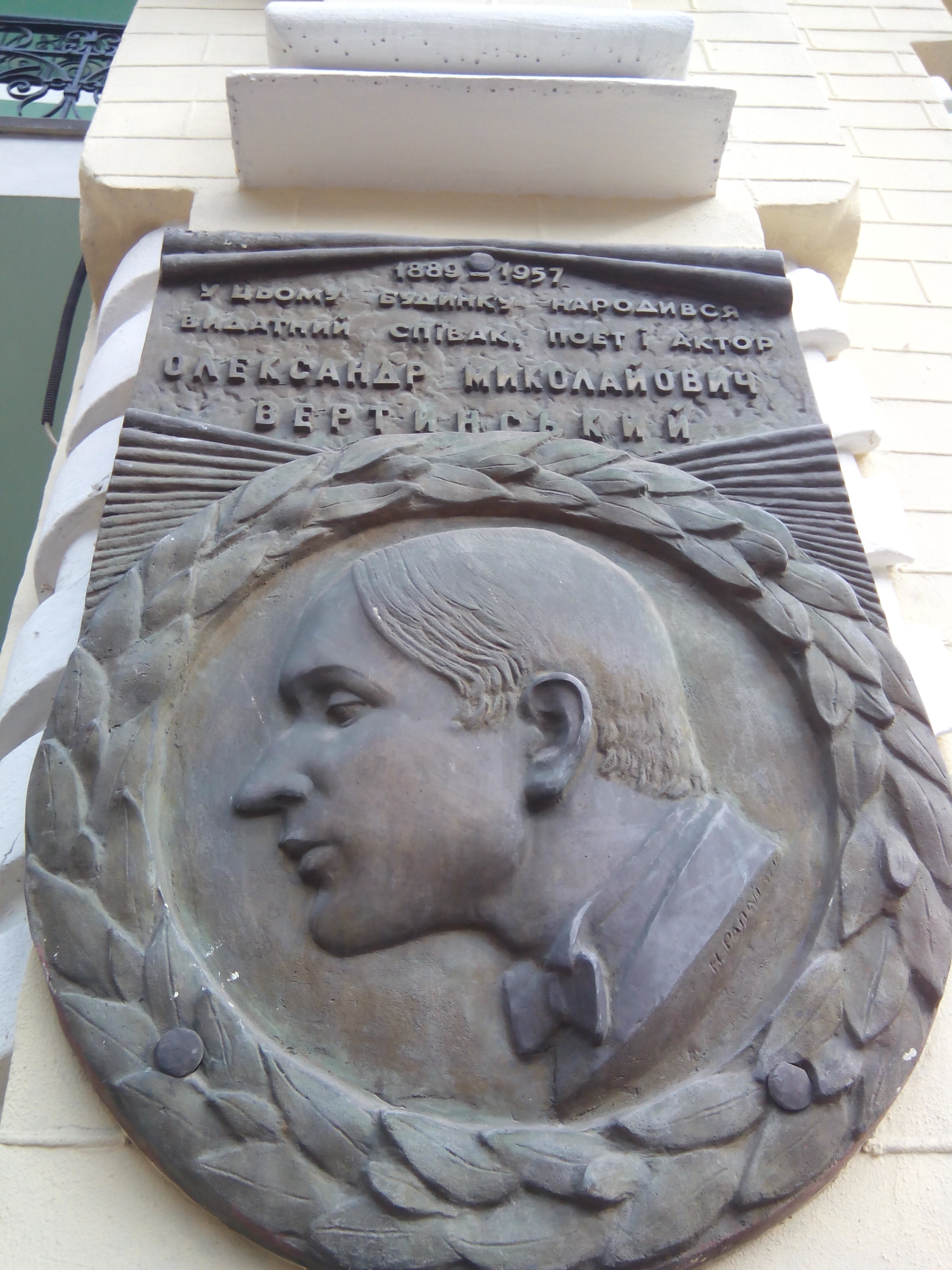
Memorial plaque to the actor Alexander Vertinsky at Volodymyrska Street, 43.

- Ivan Nechuy-Levytsky – writer (lived in house #7)
- Amvrosy Buchma – actor and director (lived in house #14)
- Vasyl Kasiyan – artist (lived in house #14)
- Nikolai Leskov – novelist, short-story writer, playwright, and journalist (worked in house #15)
- Mikhail Ikonnikov – architect (lived in house #18/2)
- Mykhailo Hrushevsky – academician, politician, historian, and statesman (gave speeches from balcony of house #21, worked in houses #35 and #57)
- Volodymyr Zabolotny – architect (lived in house #22)
- Vladimir Korolenko – short story writer, journalist, human rights activist and humanitarian (lived in house #24b)
- Mykhailo Kotsiubynsky – writer (lived in house #28)
- Viktor Vasnetsov – artist (lived in house #32)
- Boris Balinsky – biologist, embryologist and entomologist (lived in house #36)
- Alexander Vertinsky – artist, poet, singer, composer, cabaret artist and actor (born in house #43)
- Mykola Murashko – painter and art teacher (lived in houses #46 and 47)
- Mikhail Tereshchenko – landowner, owner of several sugar factories, and financier (lived in house #51a)
- Vladimir Vernadsky, Vladimir Lipsky, Danylo Zabolotny, Alexander Bogomolets, Aleksandr Palladin – scientists (worked in house #54)
- Volodymyr Vynnychenko – statesman, political activist, writer, playwright, artist (worked in house #57)
- Symon Petliura – publicist, writer, journalist, politician, statesman (worked in house #57)
- Alexander Blok – lyrical poet (born in house #79)

Also a lot of notable people studied or worked in Imperial University of St. Volodymyr (now Taras Shevchenko National University of Kyiv), which is situated on Volodymyrska street.

== Gallery ==
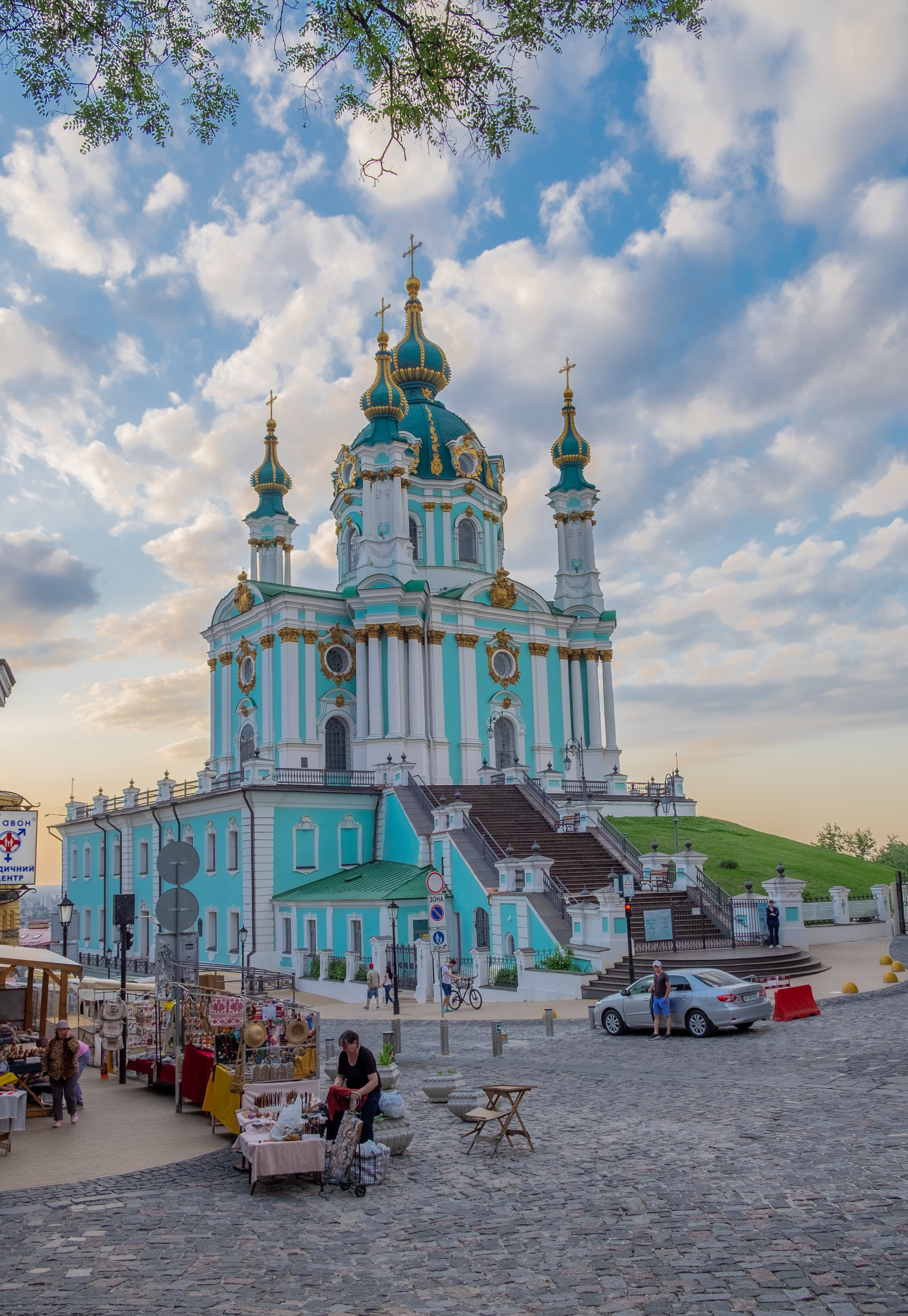
St Andrew's Church as seen from the corner of Volodymyrska and Andriivskyi Descent

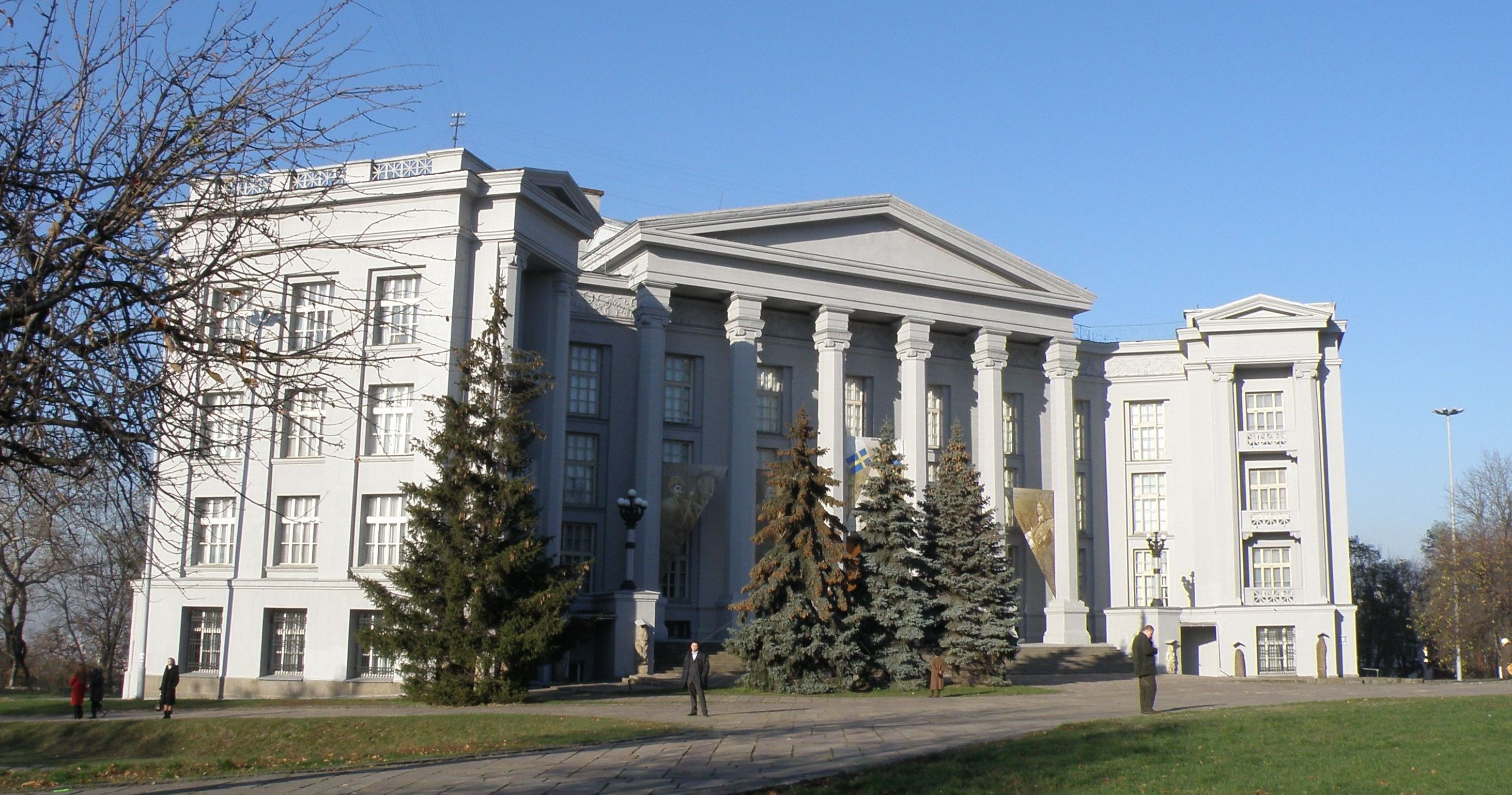
National Museum of the History of Ukraine

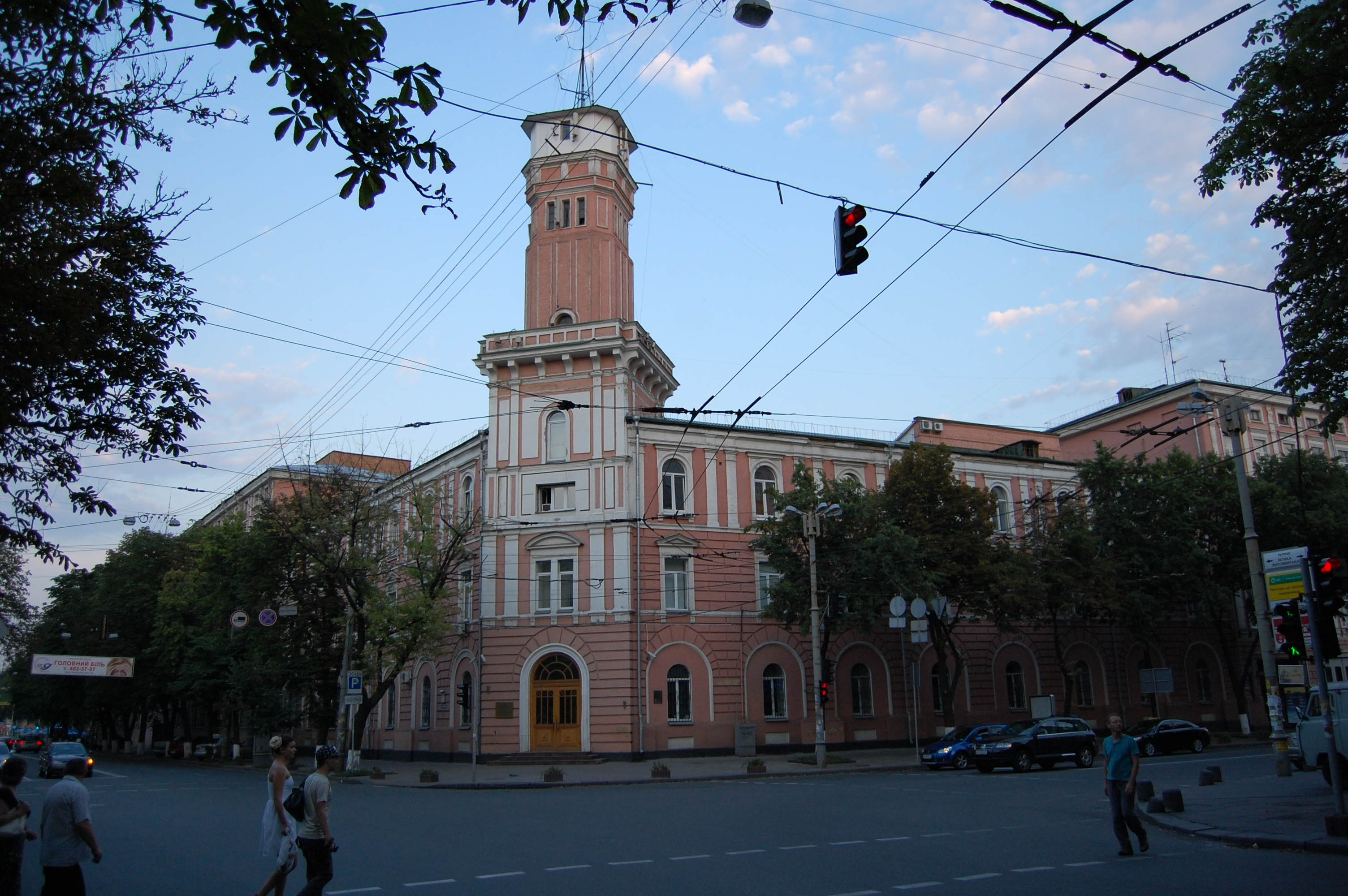
Kyiv department of the State Emergency Service of Ukraine

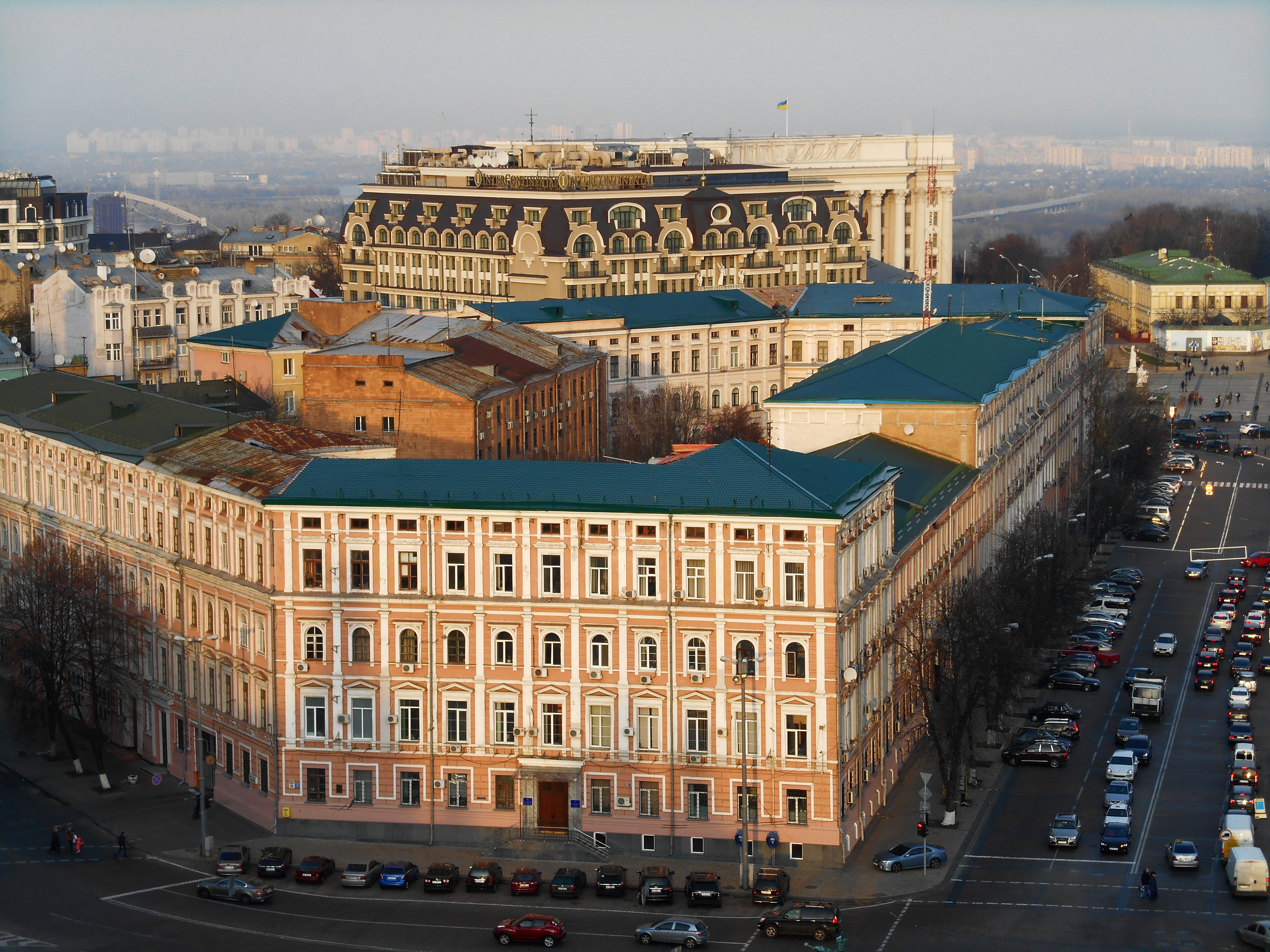
Kyiv department of the National Police of Ukraine

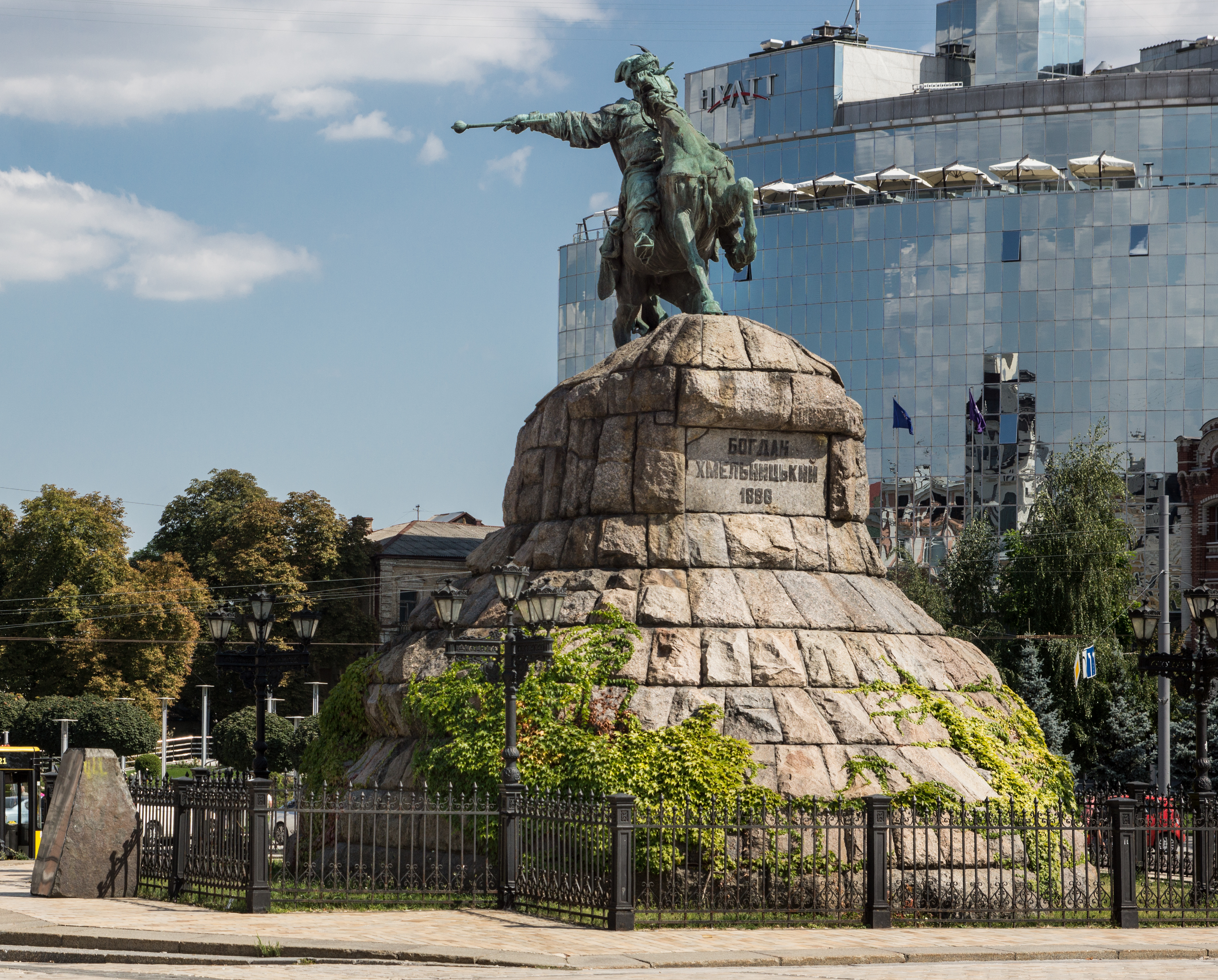
Bohdan Khmelnytsky Monument

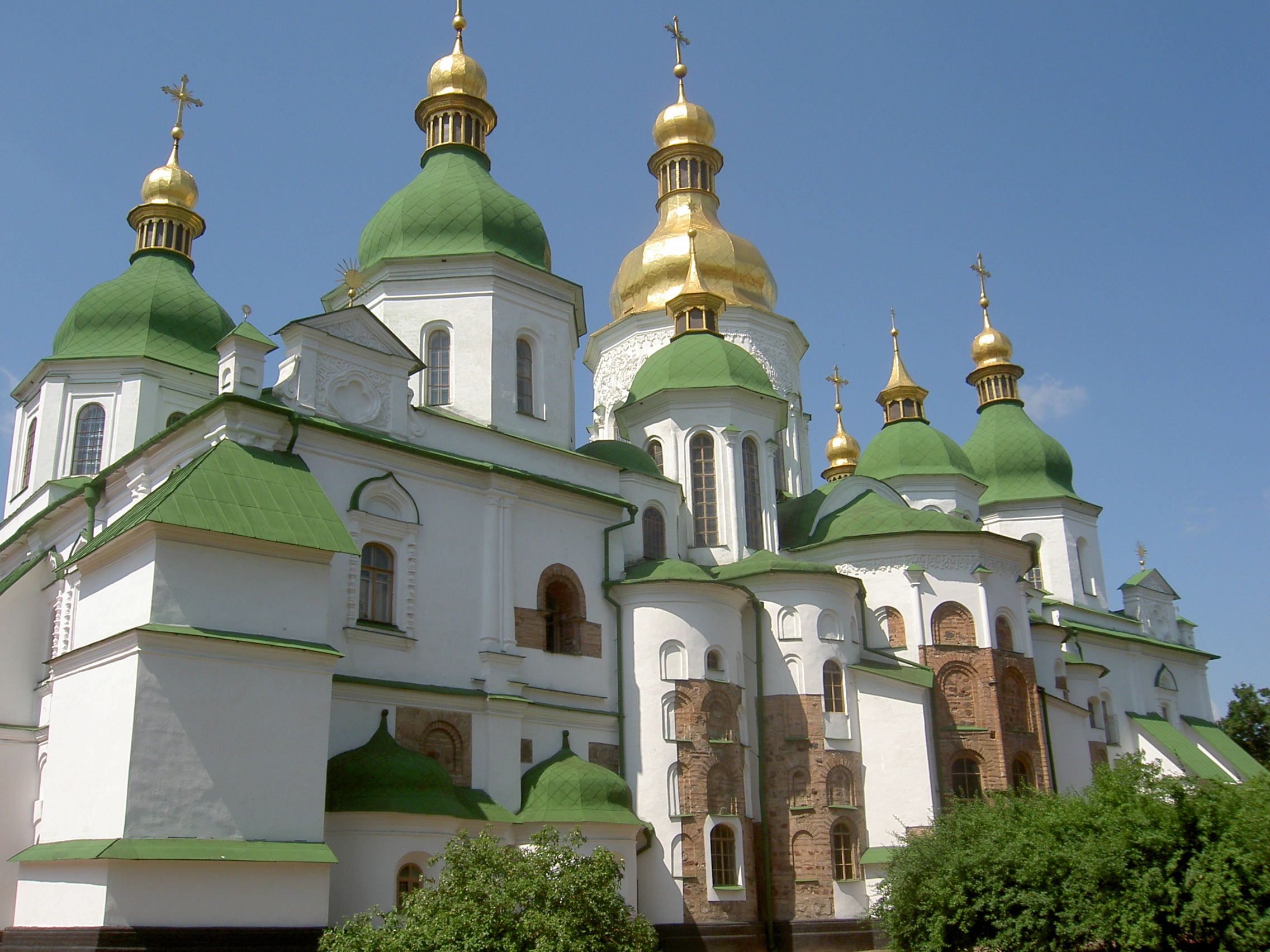
Saint Sophia's Cathedral

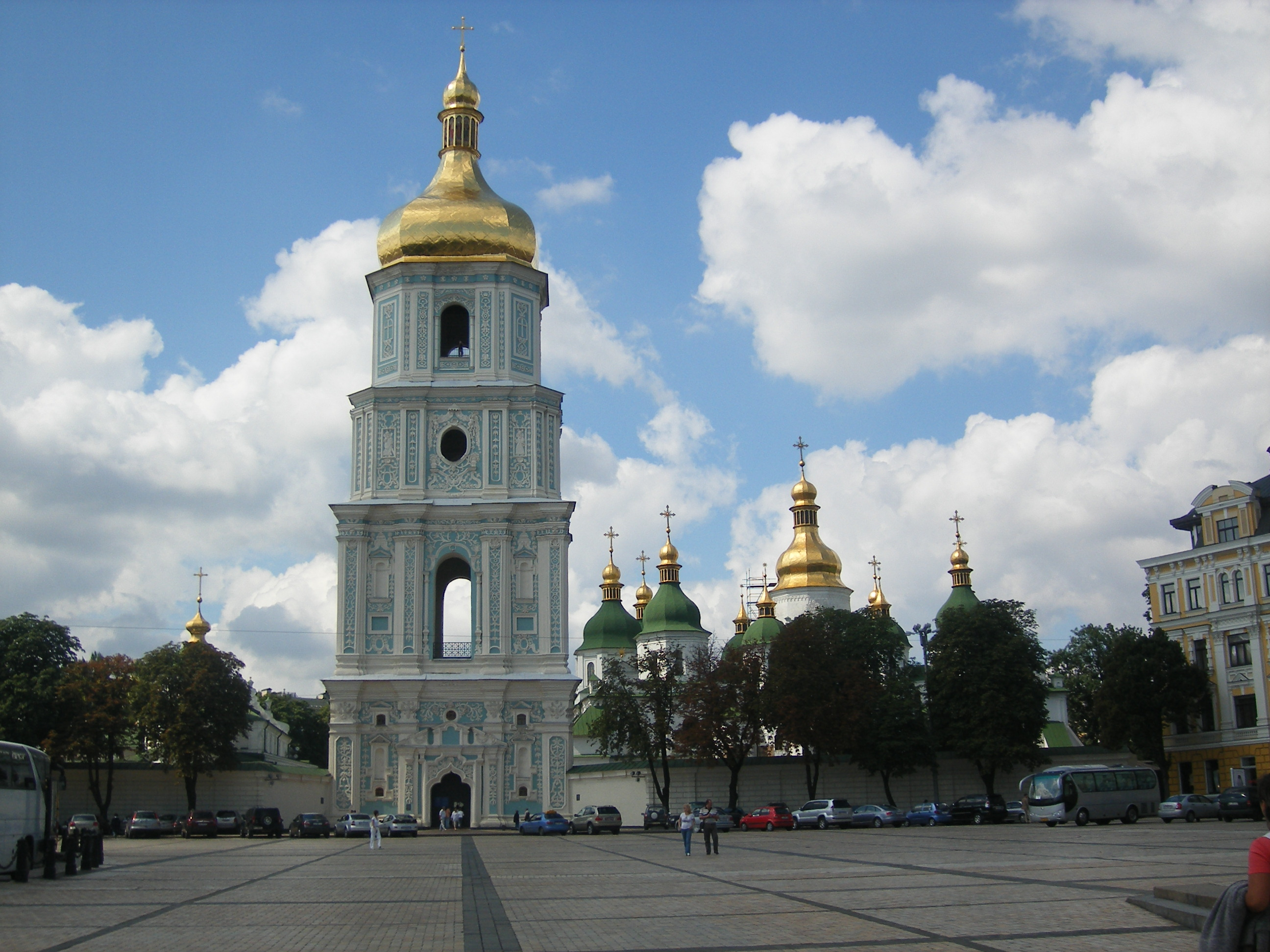
Bell Tower of Saint Sophia Cathedral

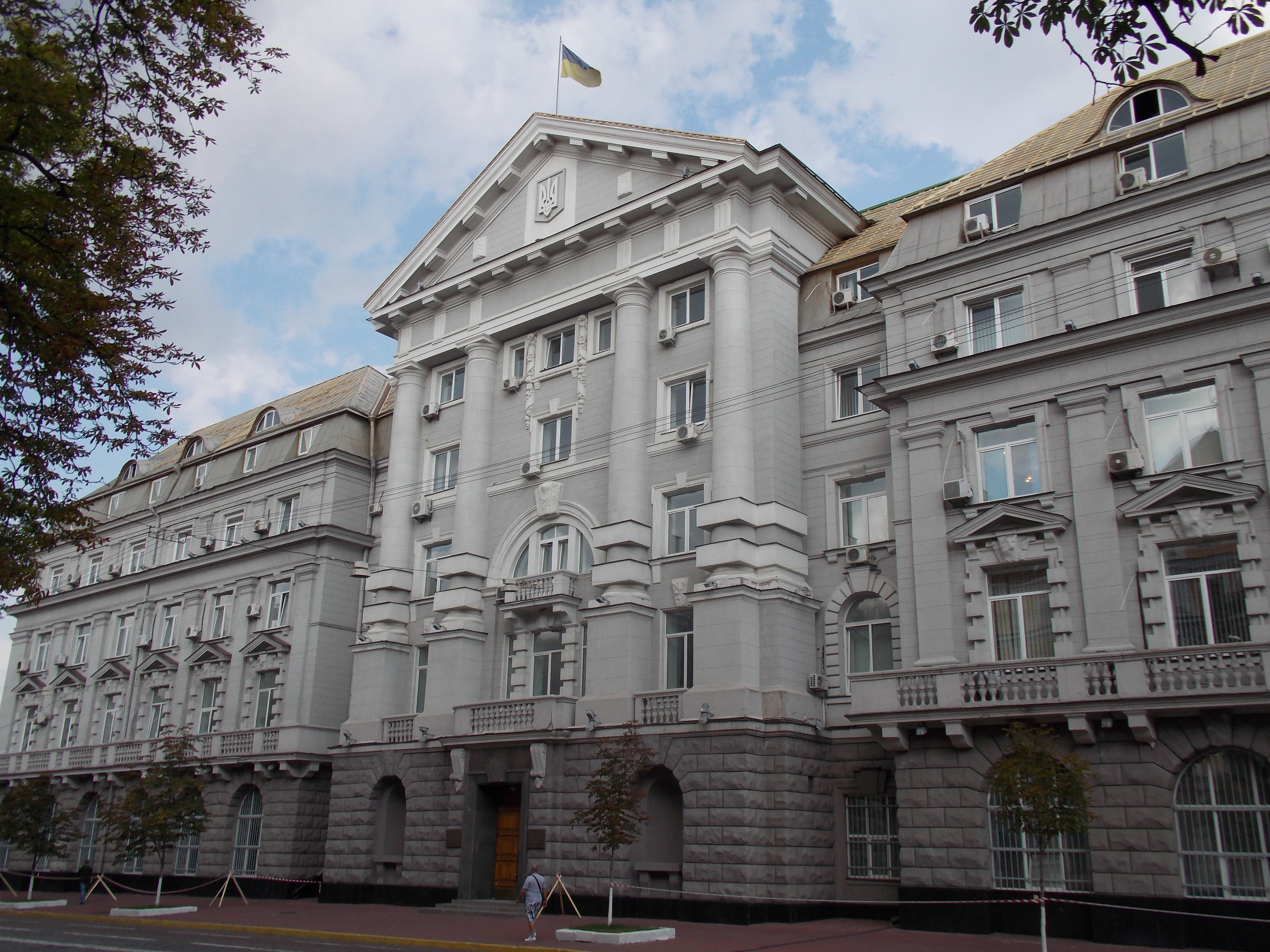
Security Service of Ukraine

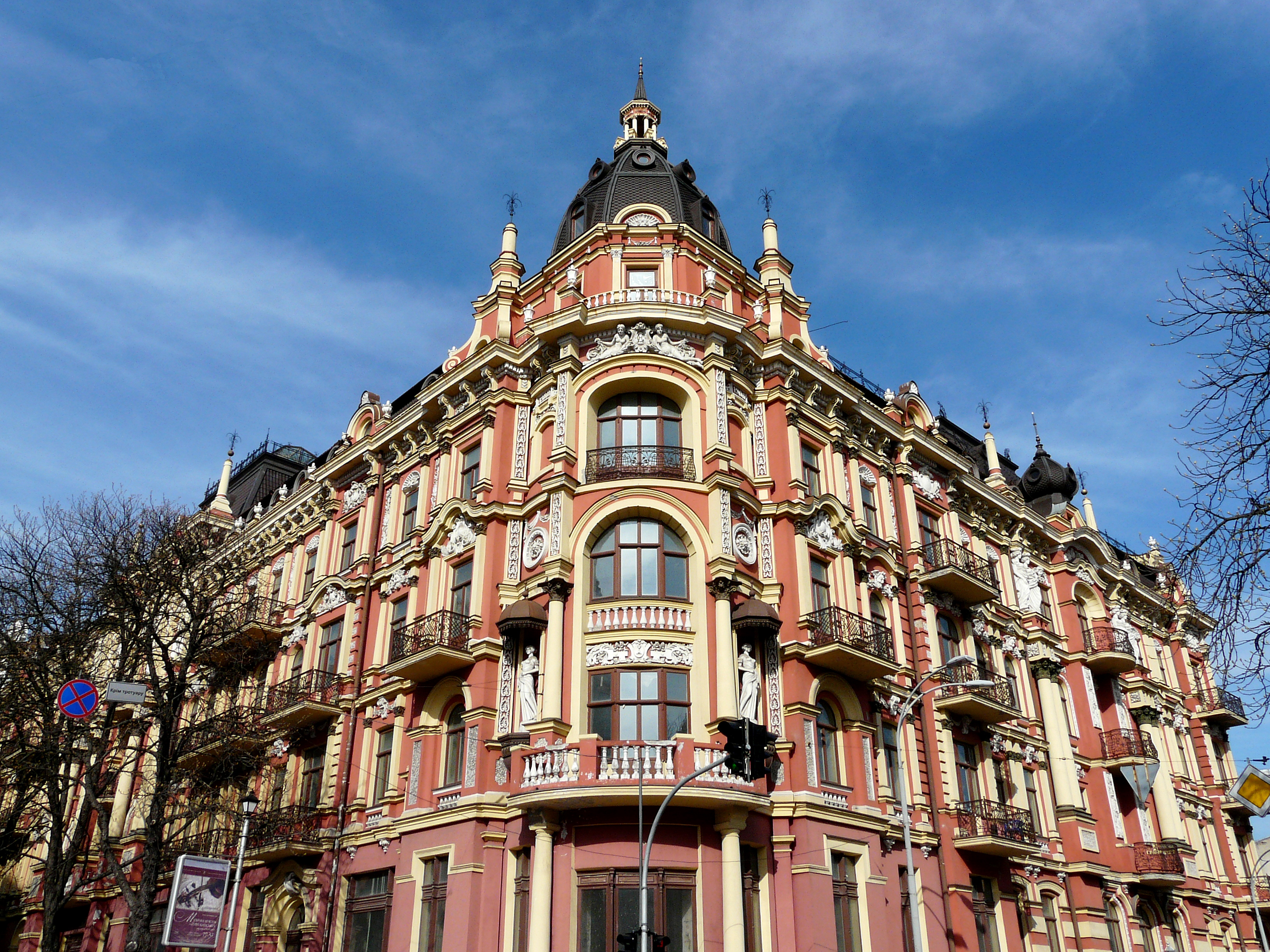
Revenue house on Volodymyrska Street, 39

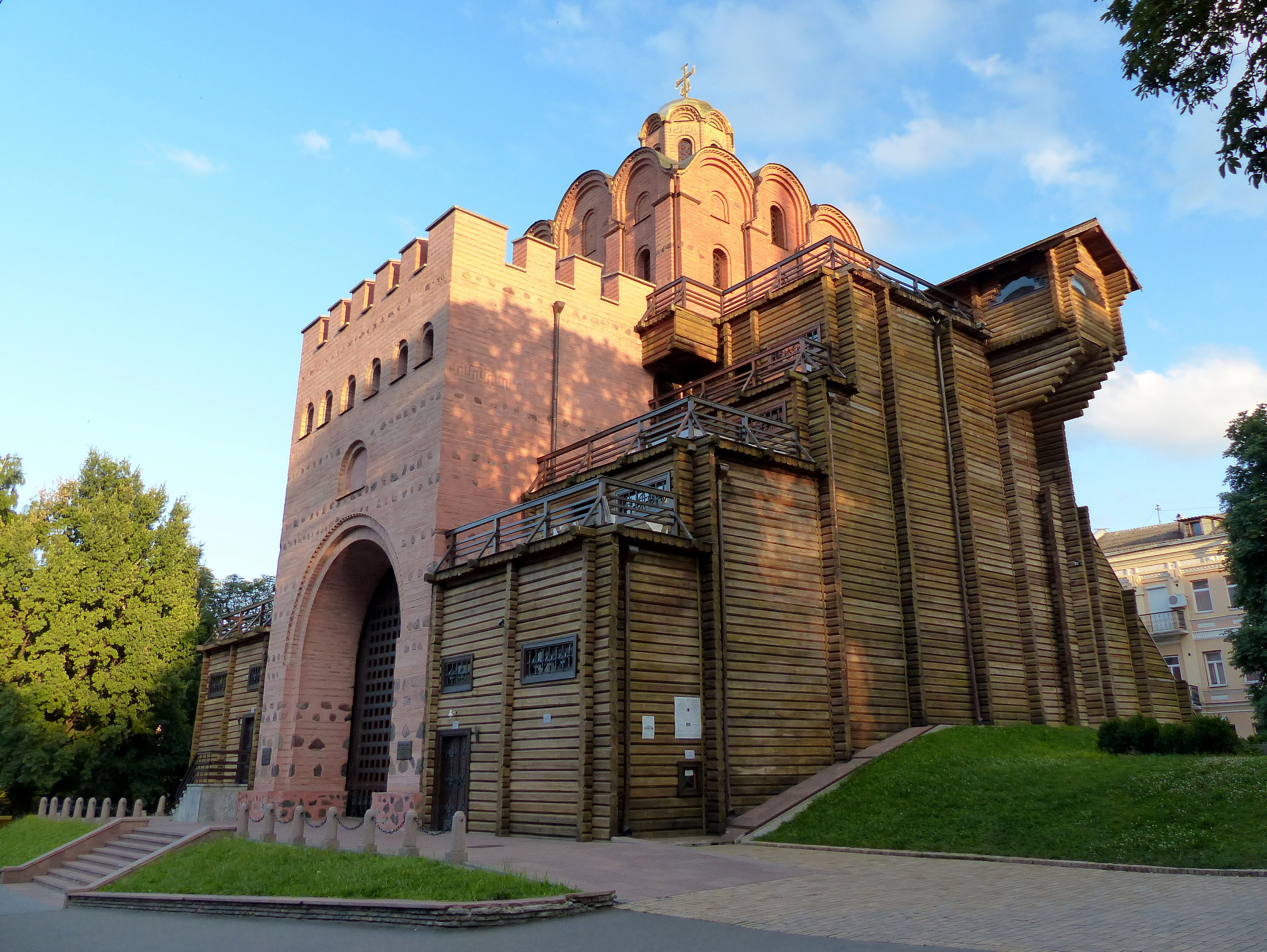
Golden Gate

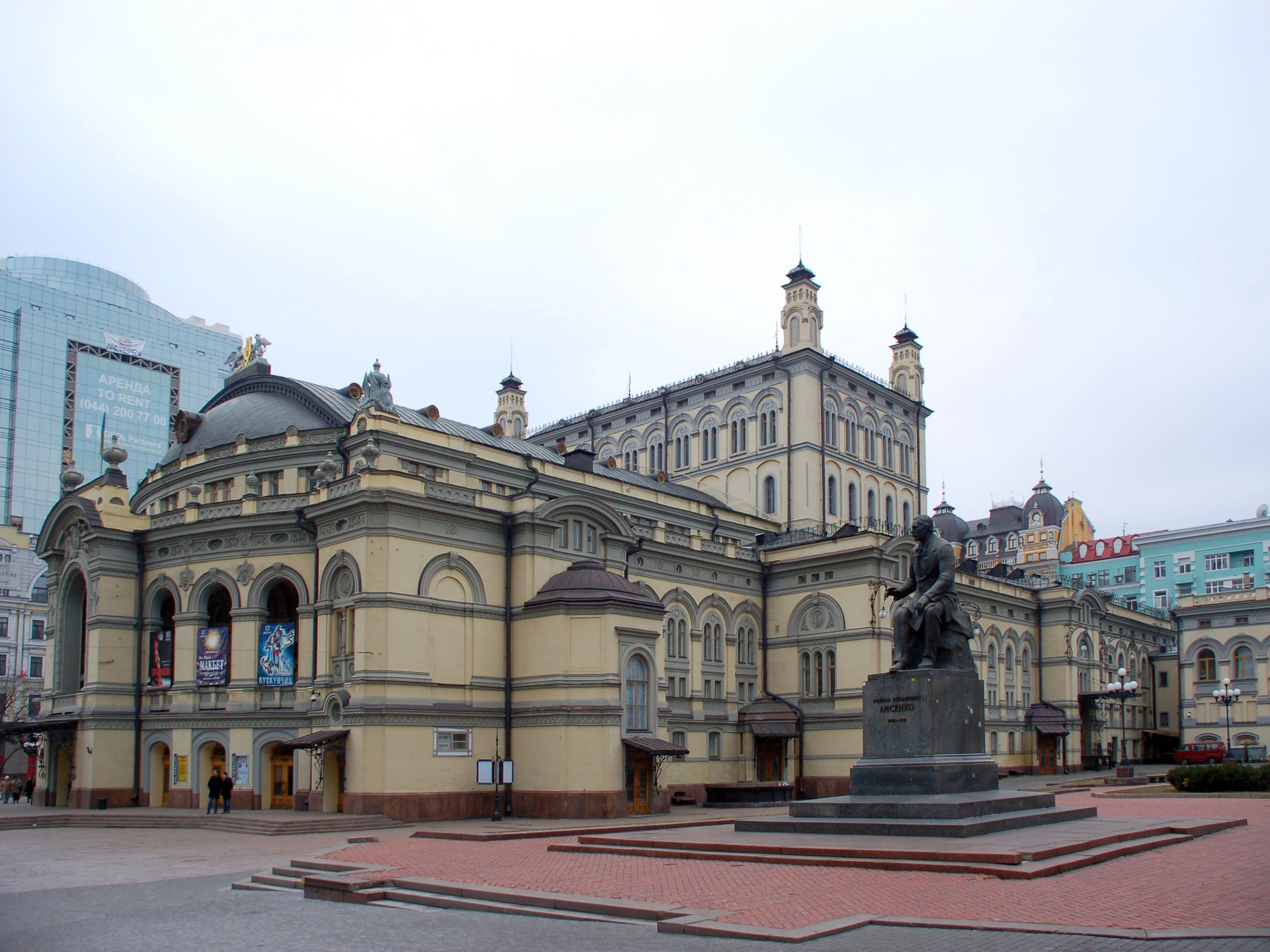
National Opera of Ukraine

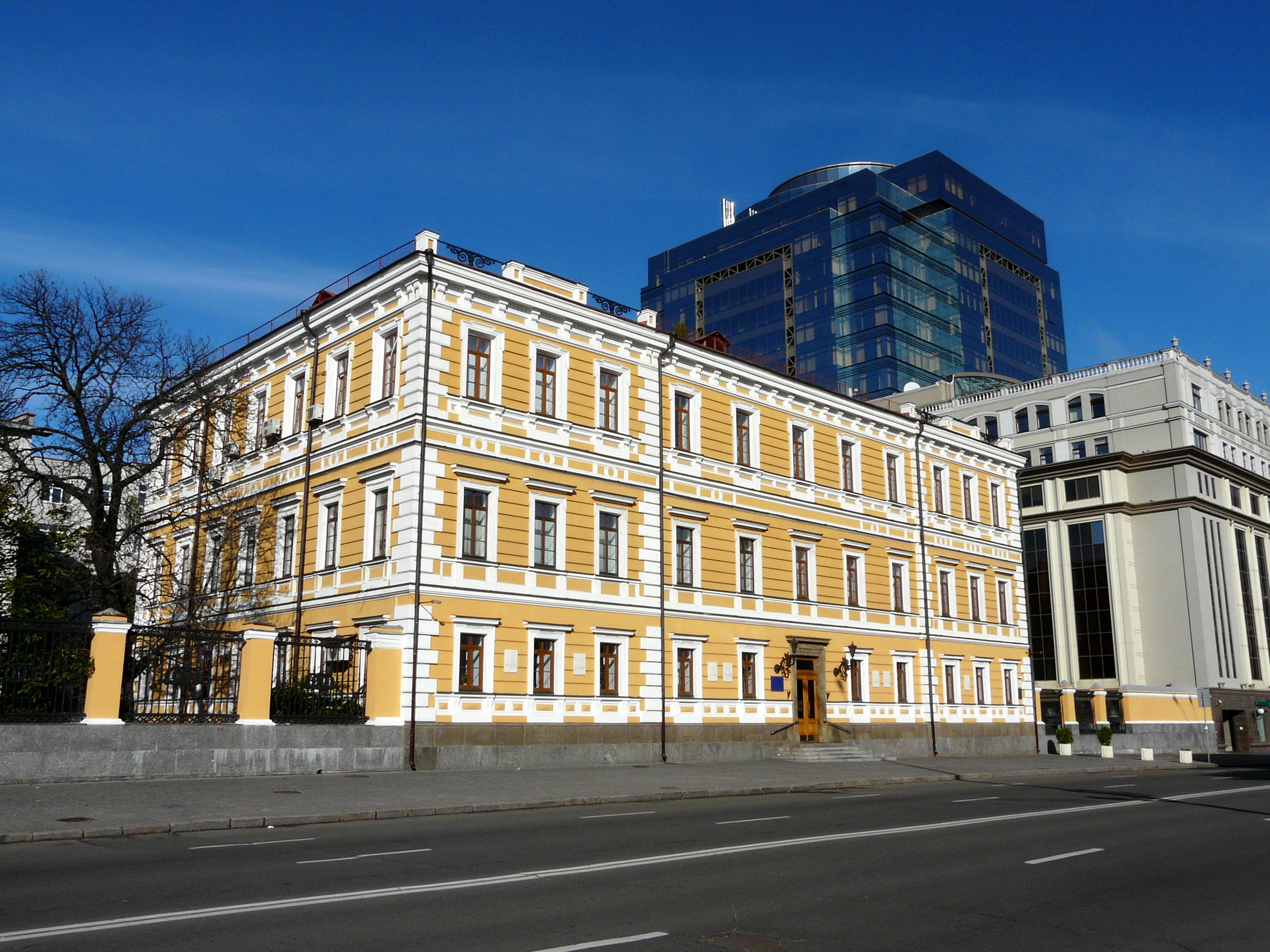
Presidium of the National Academy of Sciences of Ukraine

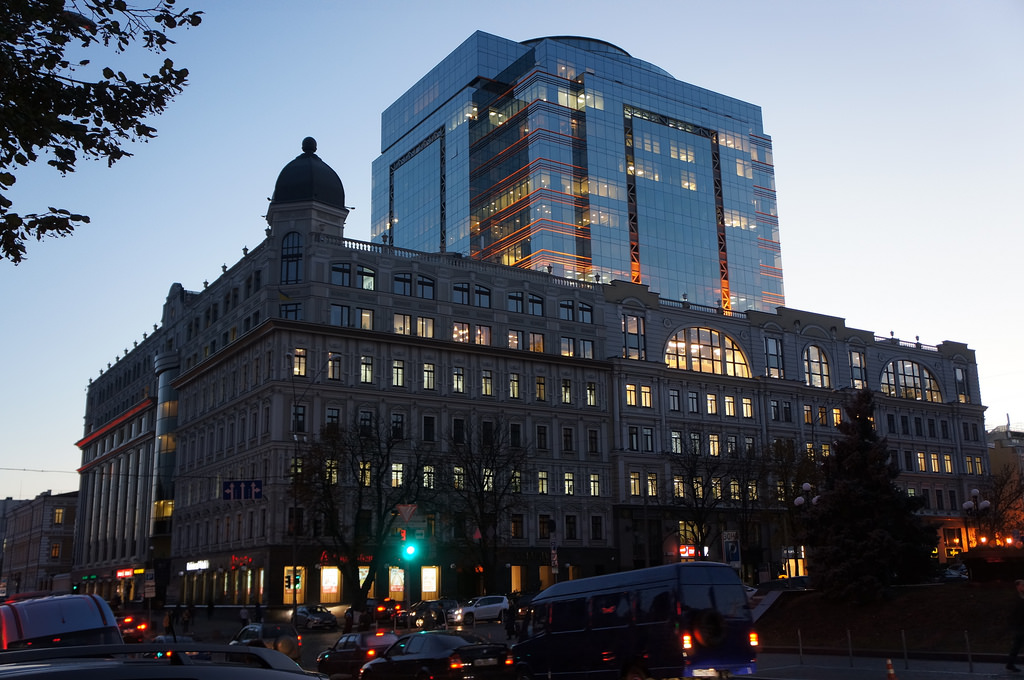
Leonardo Business Center

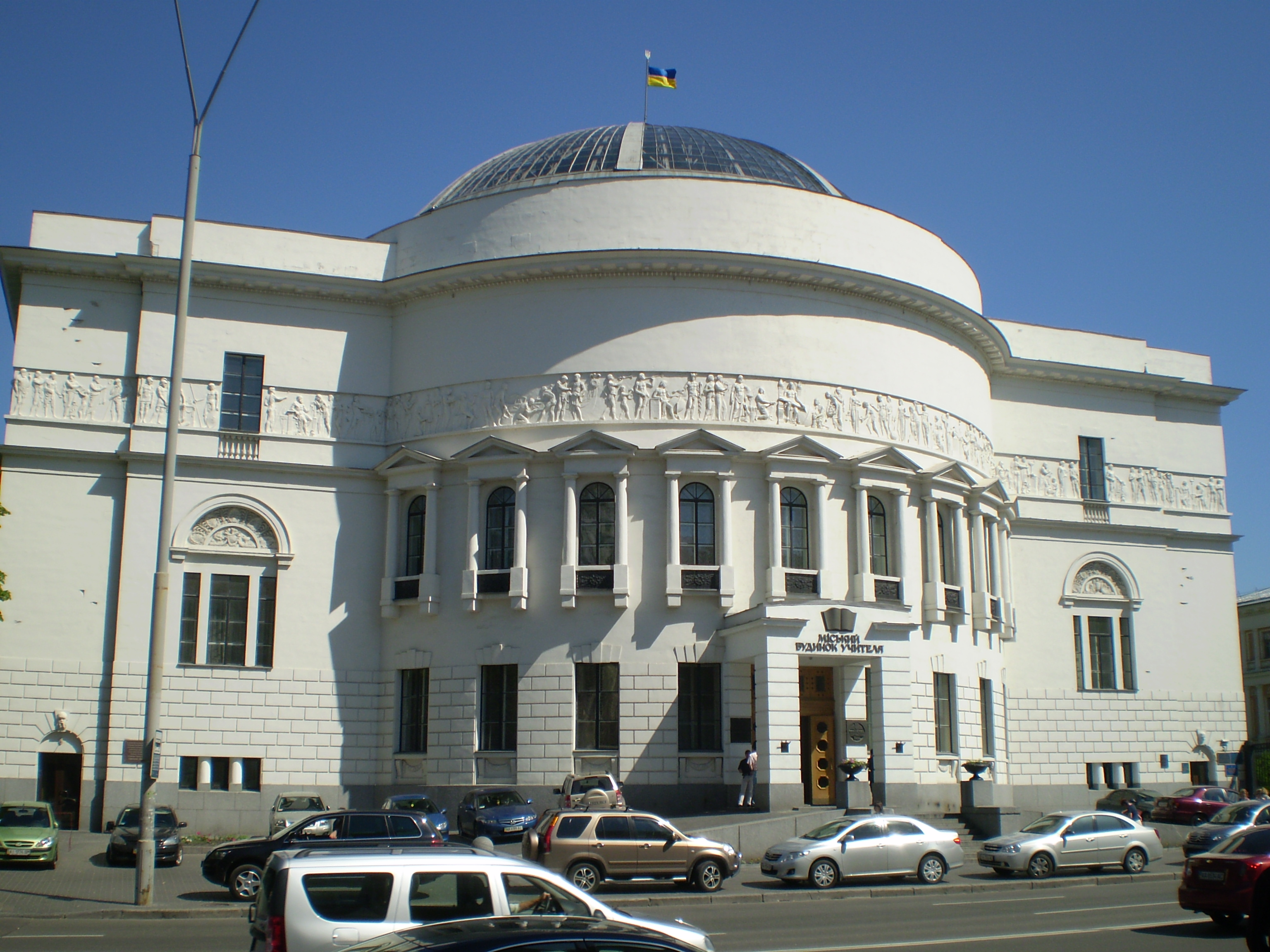
Teacher's House

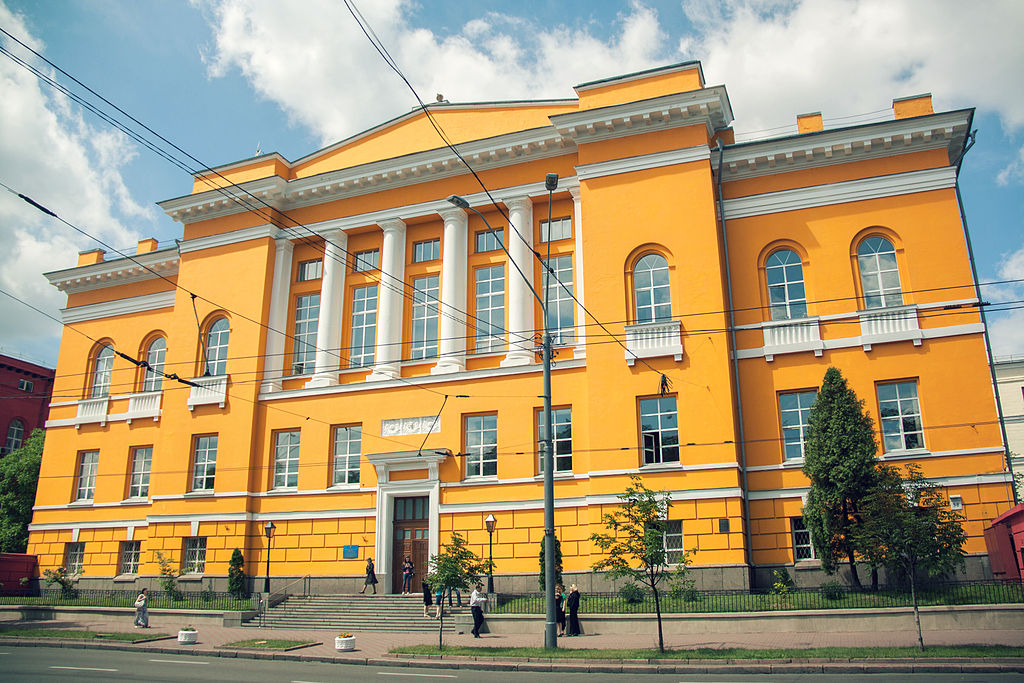
Maksymovych Scientific Library

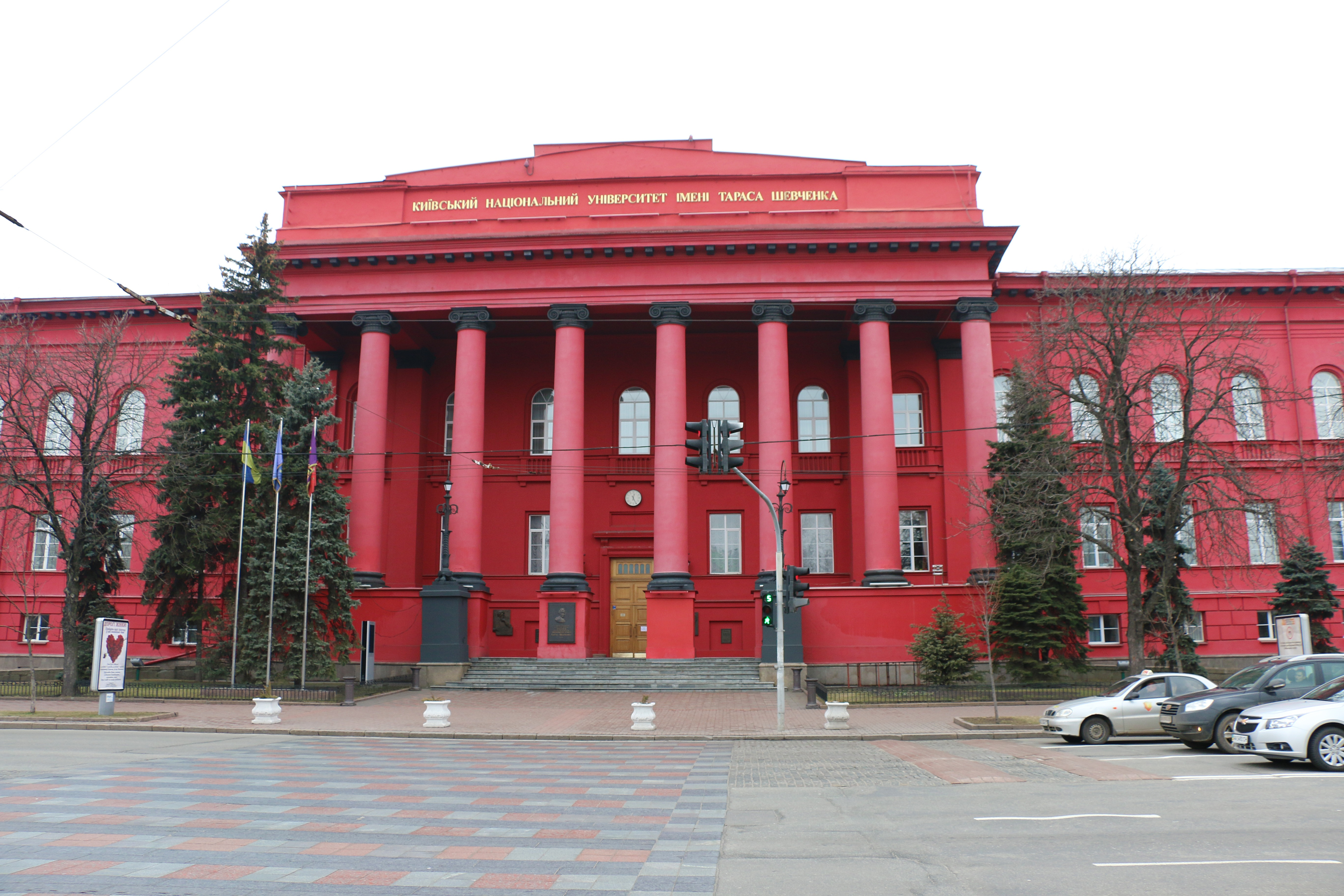
Red University Building of the Taras Shevchenko National University of Kyiv

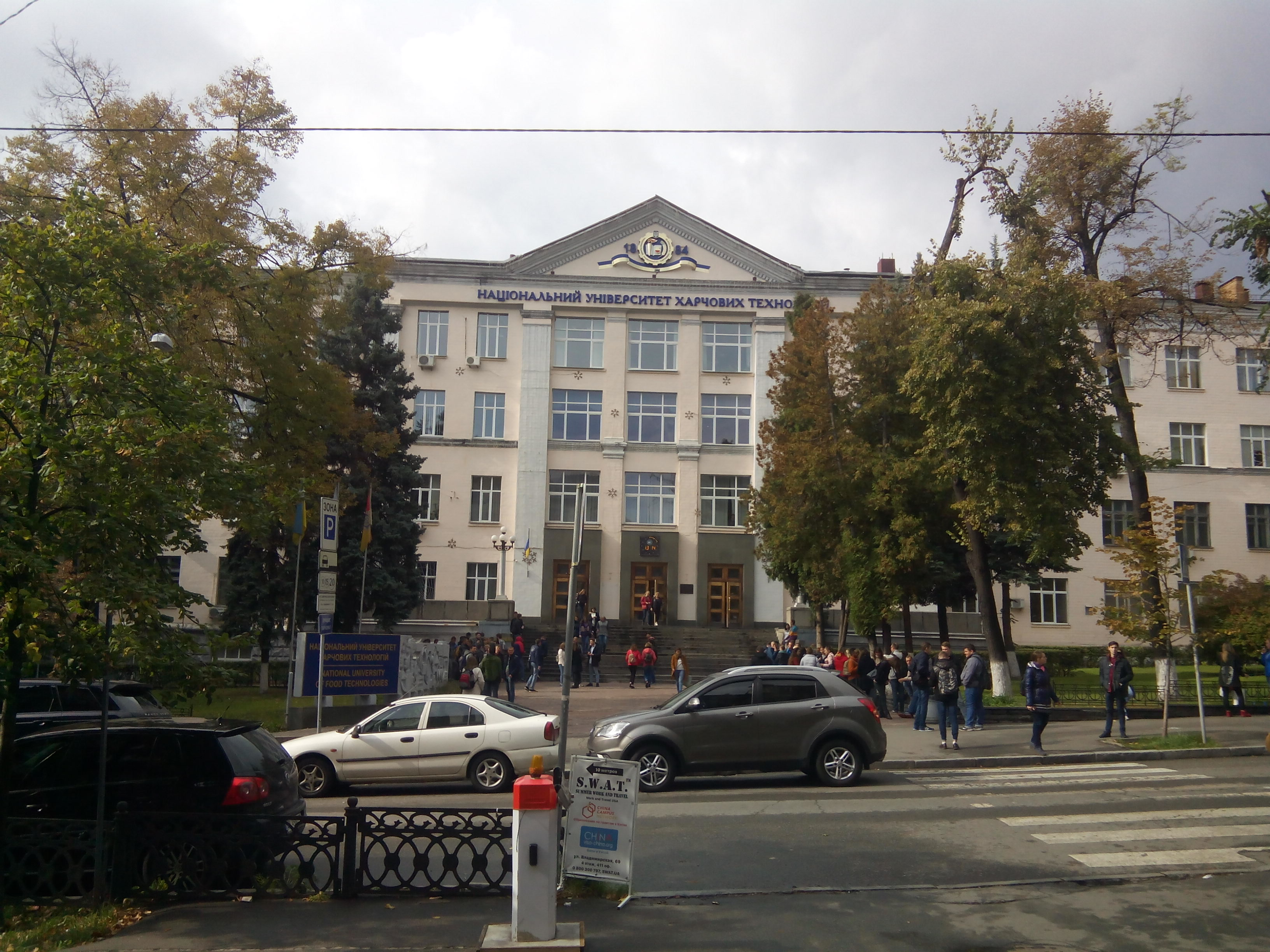
National University of Food Technologies

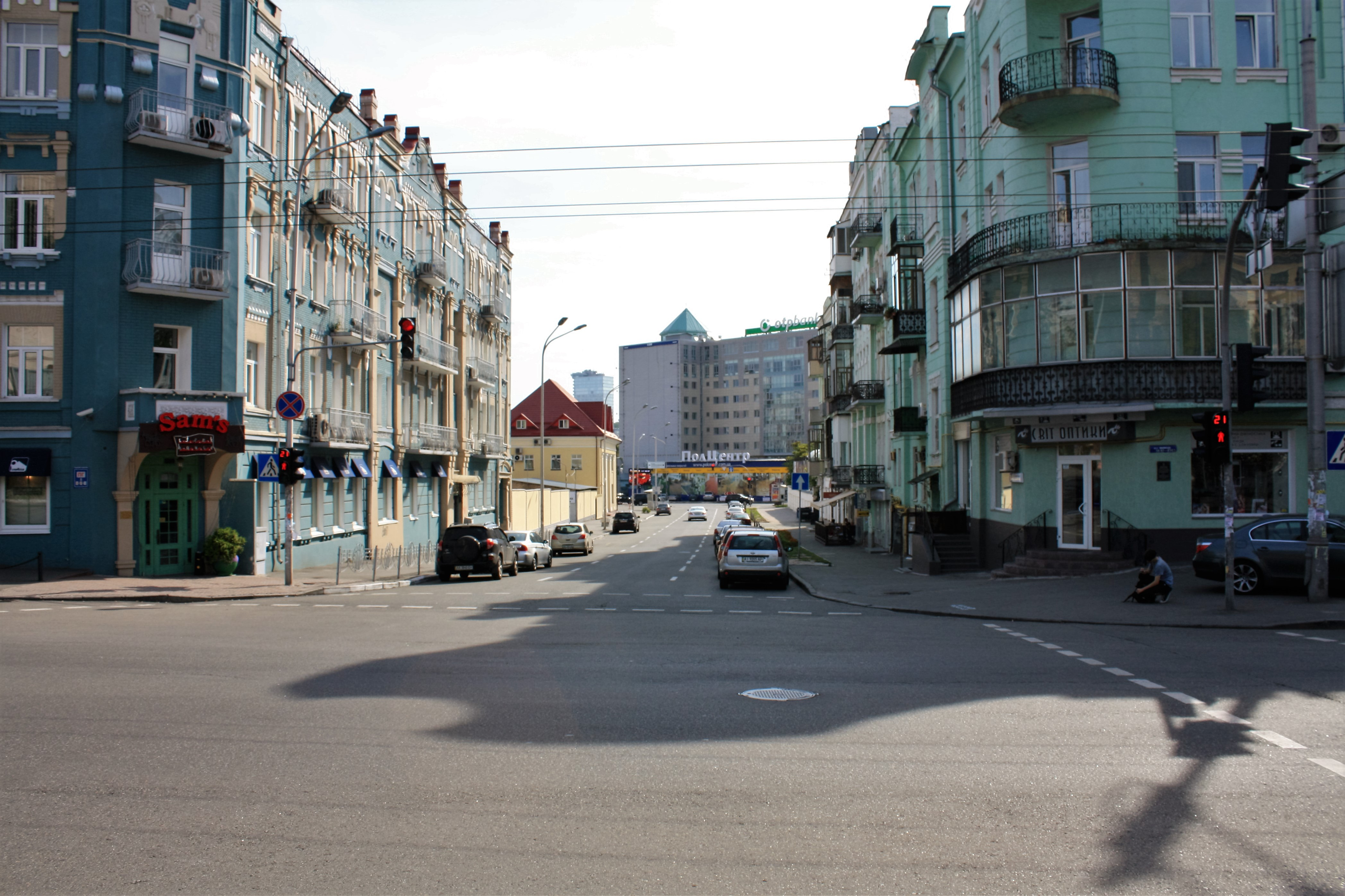
Lower part of the street in Nova Zabudova area

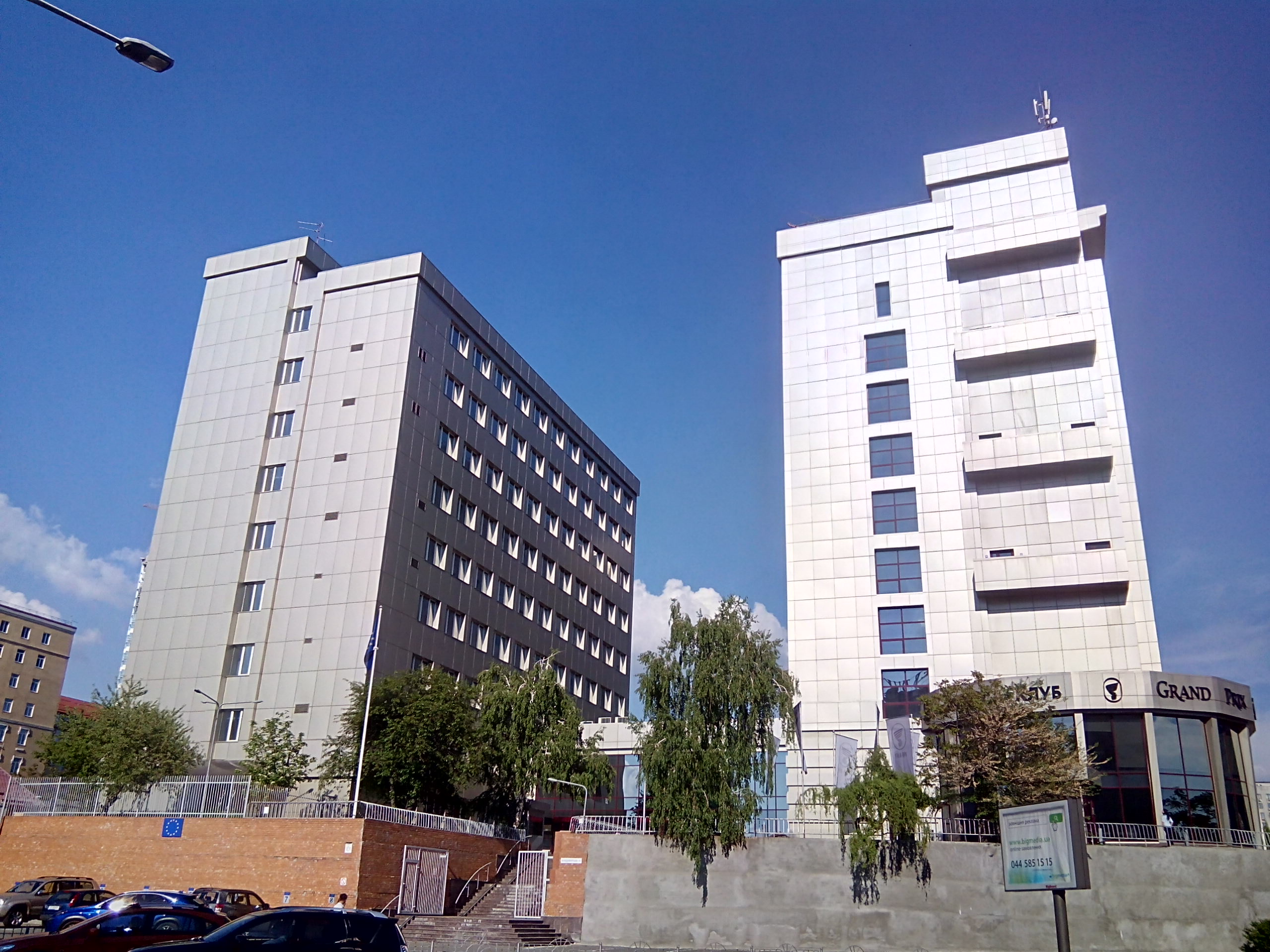
European Union delegation to Ukraine and Embassy of Ireland
