= Martine-Anstett Award =

Human rights award

Martine-Anstett Award, or Martine-Anstett Human Rights Prize, is awarded every year on 29 April in Paris to the person, man or woman, strongly committed to the defense of human rights. 29 April is the anniversary of the day Martine Anstett died. Martine Anstett Human Rights Award is also to protect the rights of migrants.

This annual prize is worth 1500 Euros.

== History ==
The award was created in June 2015 by journalist Frantz Vaillant in memory of Martine Anstett (1969–2015), a lawyer specialized in international law and who dedicated her life to Human Rights first at the United Nations (Geneva and New York City), then for Amnesty International, before joining the Organisation internationale de la Francophonie (OIF).

According to the website of the association, this international prize aims to distinguish a personality without distinction of age, sex or religion, "Because there are people in the world whose often unappreciated work, in favor of human rights, deserves to be encouraged.

== Members of the Jury ==
The jury is composed of six people (two of whom are the president and another member, two NGO members, and two journalists. It decides after a debate on the comparative merits of the selected candidates.

== Laureates ==
29 April 2016, in the presence of Michel Forst, UN Special Rapporteur on the situation of defenders of human rights and Michaëlle Jean, Secretary General of the International Organization of La Francophonie (OIF), the first Martine Anstett Award was presented to Cesar Estrada Chuquilin of Peru. spokesperson for the Indigenous peoples. César had repeatedly escaped assassination attempts. He exposed the environmental problems caused by mining project in Conga as well as several abuses concerning land conflicts in the Cajamarca region.

On 10 March 2017 in the opening ceremony of 15th film festival and forum on human Rights in Geneva Switzerland Martine Anstett prize was awarded to the photo reporter Teddy Mazina.

Teddy Mazina defines herself as a "memory activist". "Photographing is for me a political act. I am trying to build a visual memory of our history so that we do not forget what we have experienced "

On 9 March 2018, at the opening ceremony of the International Film Festival on Human Rights FIFDH in Geneva (Switzerland) the Martine Anstett prize was awarded to Egyptian lawyer Azza Soliman, human rights defender to honor her fight against violence against women in her country. In the year 2018 also Universal Declaration of Human Rights (UDHR) became 70 years old which was celebrated in the prize ceremony.

The 2019 prize was awarded to Evdokia Romanova from the city of Samara in Russia.

The winner of Martine Anstett Human Rights 2020 prize was Tahani Abass, from Sudan. Tahani Abass is a lawyer, a journalist and a women's rights advocate. Her activities included the case of Noura Hussein whose death sentence was reduced to five years' imprisonment.
