= Samara State University =

- Самарский государственный университет
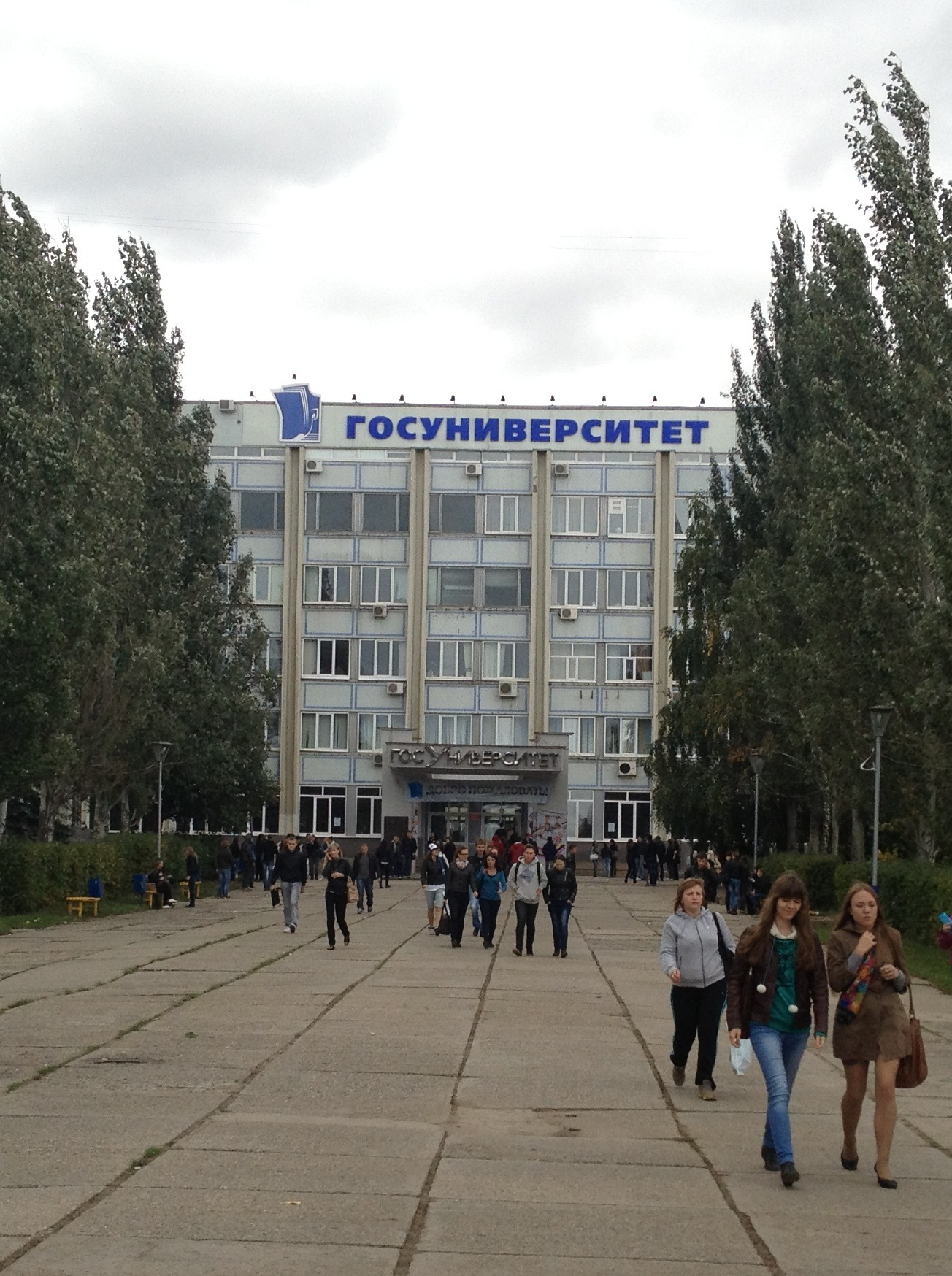
- Type: Public
- Location: Samara, Russia; Taganrog, Russia; 53°13′20″N 50°10′24″E
- Campus: Urban
- Website: www.samsu.ru

Samara State University (Russian: Самарский государственный университет) was a classical multi-faculty university and a leading educational institution of higher education in Samara Oblast, Russia. It consists of faculties of Mathematics and Mechanics, Physics, Biology, Chemistry, Philology, History, Sociology, Economy and Management, Psychology, and Law. It is considered to be the most prestigious graduate school in Samara and the area, especially with its highly competitive and demanding programmes in the English Language, Law, Sociology, Political Science, International Relations, and Psychology. SSU is also noted for its postgraduate research in the Sciences and the Humanities.

SSU had its own newspaper, a regularly printed academic journal, as well as journals for students publications. SSU is a centre of teaching and research in Samara Region with a strong reputation nationally and globally. SSU is one of the few Russian universities that issues the European Diploma Supplement to the State Diploma of Higher Education, which confirms educational standards according to international standards (ECTS). In 2015 it was merged with other institutions to form the Samara National Research University. The English language is taught here by high-qualified lecturers.

In 2014 Samara State University celebrated the 95th anniversary since its foundation and the 45th anniversary since its revival. It is a large scientific, educational and cultural centre of the Volga region with a constantly developing infrastructure. The university being of the classical type preserves the highest educational standards and education quality. The university has one regional branch in Togliatti. At present it comprises 10 basic faculties: Physics, Chemistry, Biology, Mechanics and Mathematics, History, Philology, Sociology, Psychology, Law, Economics and Management.

== Notable alumni ==
Notable alumni of Samara State University include:

- Violetta Khrapina Bida (born 1994), Olympic épée fencer
- Mark Feygin (born 1971), lawyer and human rights activist
- Nikolai Mashkin (1900–1950), scholar of Roman history
- Mikhail Matveyev (born 1968), member of the State Duma
- Dmitry Muratov (born 1961), joint recipient of the 2021 Nobel Peace Prize
- Pavel Romanov (1964–2014), sociologist
- Evdokia Romanova (born 1990), human rights activist
- Svetlana Vanyo (born 1977), Russian-American swimmer and coach
- Alexander G. Obukhov, biologist
