= Prorizna Street =

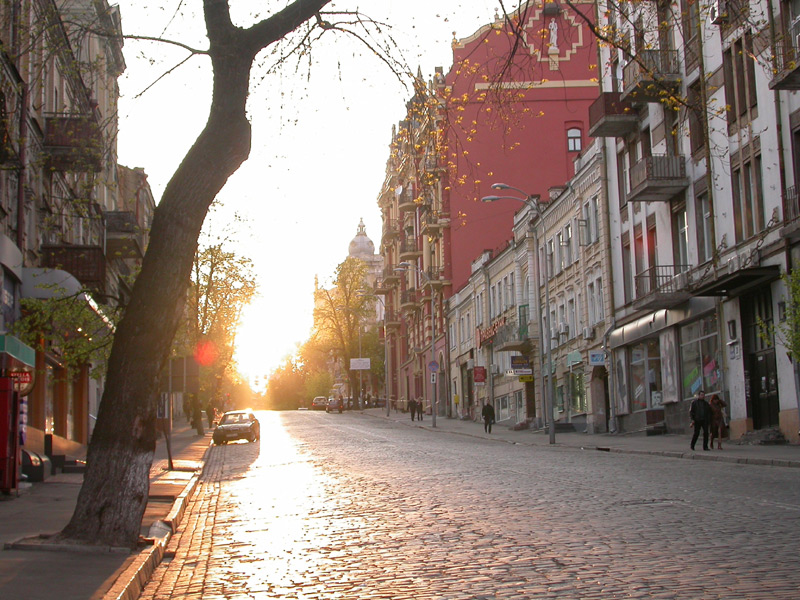
- Вулиця Прорізна
- Native name: Вулиця Прорізна (Ukrainian)
- Former names: Martynivska, Zolotokhreschatytska, Vasylchykovska, Sverdlova
- Length: 530 m (1,740 ft)
- Location: Central Kyiv, Ukraine
- Coordinates: 50°26′54.26″N 30°31′6.82″E

Prorizna Street (Ukrainian: Вулиця Прорізна) is a street located in central Kyiv, Ukraine. Prorizna Street is located between the Khreshchatyk and Volodymyrska Street. Adjoining streets are: Yevhen Chykalenko Street (until 2022 Pushkinska Street), Borysa Hrinchenka Street and Patorzhynskoho Street. There is also another Prorizna Street in Kyiv, located in Kyiv's Bilychi suburb.

== History ==
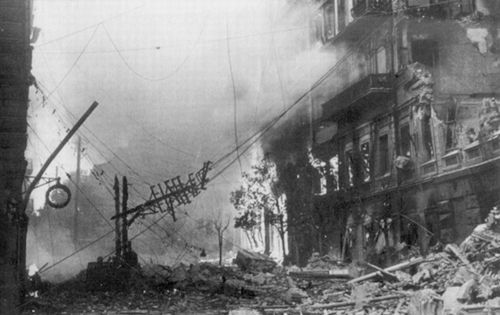
Prorizna street ruined by bombardment in 1941

The first reference to the street was found on an 1848 Kyiv city map. It was originally named "Martynivska Street." In the 1850s, the street was also known under two additional names: Zolotokhreschenska and Prorizna. From 1863 to 1919, the street was officially named Vasylchykovska, after Kyiv General-Governor I.I.Vasylchikov. However, its current name, Prorizna, was also widely used. From 1919 until 1990, the street was named after Bolshevik leader Yakov Sverdlov. It was damaged in 1941 and remained ruined during the German occupation of Kyiv, from 1941 to 1943, being eventually restored after World War II.

The street officially changed to its historical name, Prorizna, in 1990.

== Notable buildings ==
- Kyiv Academic Young Theatre is located in building number 17. It was constructed in 1902.

== Monuments ==
- Michael Panikovski Monument - dedicated to fictional character from "The Little Golden Calf" novel written by Ilf and Petrov.
- Les Kurbas monument. Installed in 2002.

== Transport ==
Metro stations located near Prorizna street are Khreshchatyk, Maidan Nezalezhnosti and Zoloti Vorota
