= Pavel Romanov =

Pavel V. Romanov
- Павел Васильевич Романов
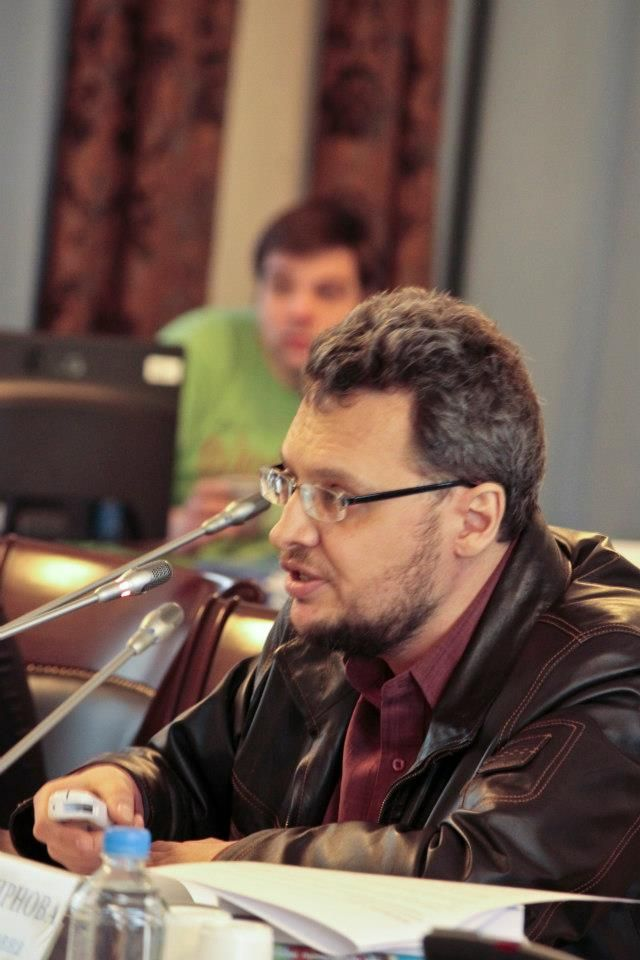
- Born: 22 May 1964; Kuybyshev, USSR
- Died: 9 June 2014 (aged 50)
- Education: Kuibyshev State University
- Scientific career
- Fields: Sociology, Ethnographic method in Sociology
- Workplaces: National Research University – Higher School of Economics
- Website: www.pavel-romanov.com

Pavel (Vasil'evich) Romanov (22 May 1964 – 9 June 2014) was a Russian sociologist, Doctor of Social Sciences, the professor of the HSE (National Research University - Higher School of Economics) department of socio-economic systems and social politics; the editor-in-chief of the Journal of Social Policy Studies; the director of the Center for Social Policy and Gender Studies. He was one of the most authoritative Russian researchers whose topics include Sociology of organizations, social politics, sociology of professions and Ethnographic method in Sociology.

== Biography ==
Pavel Romanov was born in Kuybyshev (Samara now) in the family of engineers. After graduating the school he was working during a year on the metallurgical plant "Metallurg". He avowed that later on this work determined the sphere of his scientific interests as sociologist-researcher. In 1984 he labored on the summer permanent establishment of Limnological Institute (Siberian Branch of the Russian Academy of Sciences) in Irkutsk in the capacity of "workman in science".

Although, his interest in Sociology and Psychology appeared quite early, the choice of speciality was made in favor of biological faculty of Kuibyshev state University. During the studying in university he took part in debating-societies, constructive groups in Psychology and Sociology. In that way, his personal interest to Social disciplines grew stronger.

From 1985 to 1987 he participated in the School of Young Sociologist where he met Budimir G. Tukumtsev, Olga K. Samartseva and Anna S. Gotlib. He started to conduct his first empirical studies. In 1989, after graduating the university he began to work as a research assistant under the direction of Irina M. Kozina in sociological laboratory of Samara State Academy of Social Sciences and Humanities.

From 1993 to 1998 he worked in projects "Trade Unions and Industrial Relations in Post-Communist Russia" under the direction of Simon Clarke, a professor of University of Warwick, Great Britain. He also was included in the interregional Institute for Comparative Labour Relations Research, participated in field surveys, probations, scientific seminars and preparations of project's publications.

From 1993 to 1996 in the context of the project Tempus under the direction of professor Simon Clarke and Sergei E. Kukhterin Pavel Romanov developed and then read fundamentally new courses "Sociology of Management" and "Qualitative Studies" in the Center of Sociological Education of the Institute of Sociology of the Russian Academy of Sciences (from 1995 to 2011), "Anthropology of organizations" in Yuri Gagarin State Technical University of Saratov (from 2000 to 2011), "Management of projects" in the Moscow School of Social and Economic Sciences (from 2003 to 2007), "Theory of organizations" in the State University "Higher School of Economics" (from 2008 to 2010) and "Corporate Social Politics" in the National Research University - Higher School of Economics (from 2010 to 2014).

During two years since 1995 he was studied in postgraduate course of the Institute of Sociology of the Russian Academy of Sciences under the scientific direction of professor Gennady Batygin. In 1997 Pavel received the PhD in Sociology, the speciality was "Theory, Methodology and the History of Sociology" (Institute of Sociology of the Russian Academy of Sciences, Moscow, the topic of the dissertation was "Ethnographic method in Sociology").

In 1996 in common with Elena R. Iarskaia-Smirnova he established a Center for Gender Studies as network interregional organization in the capacity of the temporary creative group.

In 1998 he became a scholarship holder of the Fulbright Program, next he trained in the University of North Carolina at Chapel Hill.

In 2000 he researched his doctoral thesis in Sociology on the topic "Management as a form of Social Practice" (Saratov, Yuri Gagarin State Technical University.

From 2000 to 2007 he was a professor of the Social Anthropology and Social Work Department in the Yuri Gagarin State Technical University of Saratov. In common with Elena R. Iarskaia-Smirnova, Valentina N. Iarskaya, Tatiana I. Chernyaeva he opened the educational program "Social Anthropology", developed the concept of the program as interpretative theoretical prospect of the social anthropology and qualitative studies.

From 2003 to 2007 he was a professor of the Moscow School for the Social and Economic Sciences.

Since 2003 he was a director of Independent non-profit-making scientific-research organization the Center for Social Policy and Gender Studies, joint editor of the Journal of Social Policy Studies.

From 2007 to 2009 he worked as a professor of the faculty of Management in the National Research University - Higher School of Economics.

From 2010 to 2014 he was a professor of Socio-economic systems and Social Politics Department, the editor-in-chief of the Journal of Social Policy Studies, the member of the Russian Society of Sociologists, International Sociological Association, European Sociological Association and EspaNET.

He died on 9 June 2014.

== Professional interests ==
Social Politics, Social History, Labour Relations, Sociology and Anthropology of Professions, Organizations and Management, Visual Studies, Methods of Sociological Researches, Economic Anthropology, Gender Studies.

== Work ==
=== Educational work ===
He was a professor in the following courses:

- Organizational anthropology (SSTU)
- Economic anthropology (SSTU)
- Social management (SSTU)
- Qualitative Methods of Sociological Research (Institute of Sociology of the Russian Academy of Sciences, SSTU)
- Sociology of management (IS of the RAS)
- Sociology of health (IS of the RAS)
- Social project management (MSSES)
- Comparative social policy (MSSES)
- Theory of organization (HSE)
- Corporate social policy (HSE)
- Scientific seminar "Sociology of public sphere and social communication" (HSE)
- Social policy (SSTU, HSE)

Taught at several international summer schools, did open lectures in several universities.

=== Scientific work ===
Created the concept of Industrial Paternalism, which is a management practice based upon a system of mutual expectations and actions from both the workers and the manager. He also studied the specifics of the basic organization of industry and social services.

He developed anthropological theory and the theory of sociology of profession. By adapting the neoweberian model to the real social situation in Russia, he studied the ideology of professionalism, implementation of social policy by social service structures, structures of the welfare state, problems of gender, social inclusion, disability, human rights, poverty and social inequality.

He was one of the first Russian sociologists to use the phenomenological approach, visual and qualitative methods in social policy research.

He also implemented a lot of projects (both individual and collective), by being the chief researcher with financial support from the Higher School of Economics, European Commission, CAF, The Russian Humanitarian Research Foundation, The Russian Foundation for Basic Research, Independent Institute for Social Policy, Moscow Public Scientific Foundation, The Khamovniki Foundation for social research, civil society support program "Dialog", The Ford Foundation, The John D. and Catherine T. MacArthur Foundation and others. Conducted research on behalf of local governments and the Ministry of Labour and Social Affairs.
