= Red University Building =

Building of the Taras Shevchenko National University of Kyiv

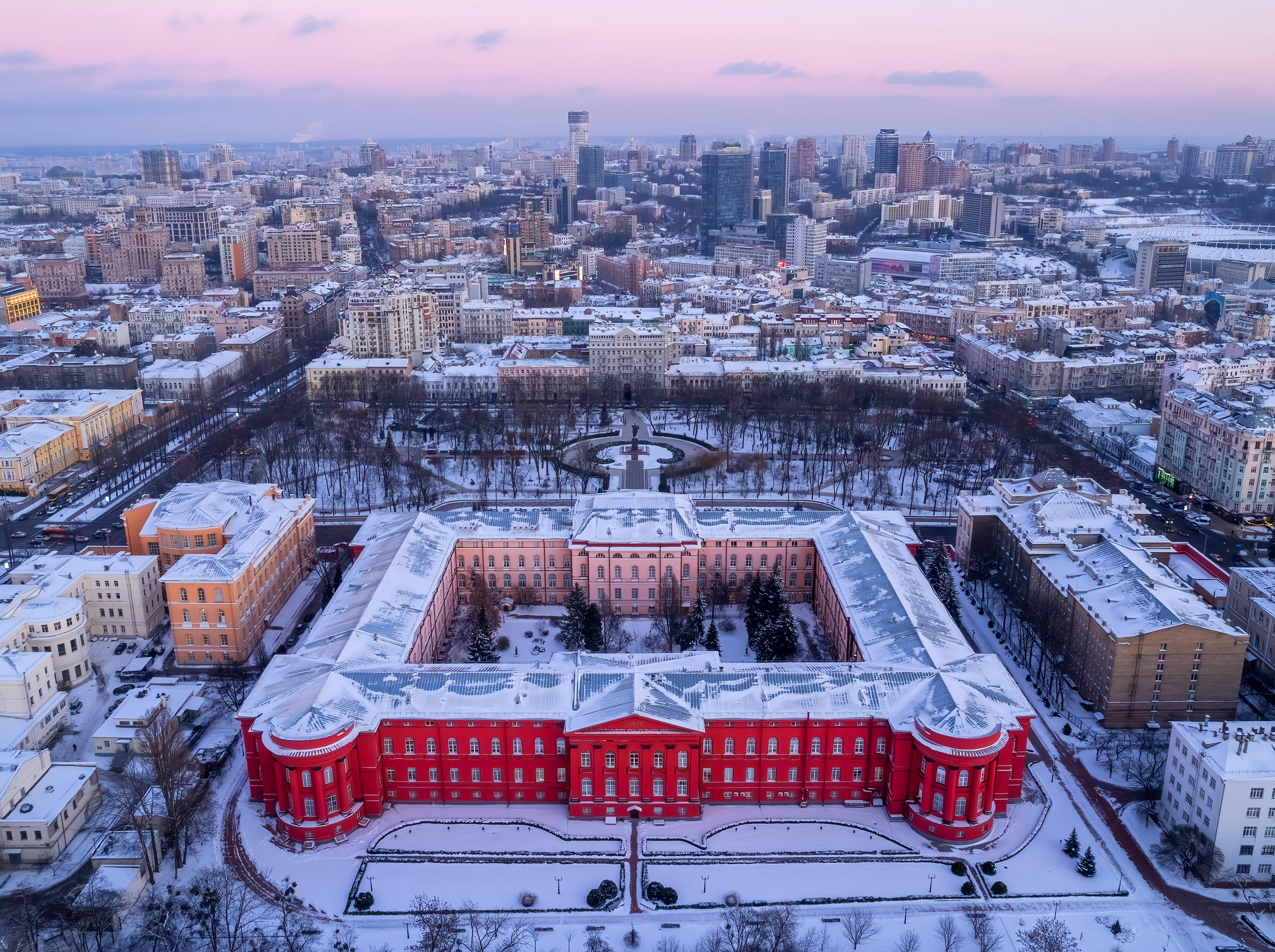
- Aerial view, January 2022.

General information
- Architectural style: late Classicism
- Location: Kyiv, Ukraine
- Coordinates: 50°26′30.99″N 30°30′40.53″E
- Construction started: 1837
- Completed: 1843

Design and construction
- Architect: Vincent I. Beretti

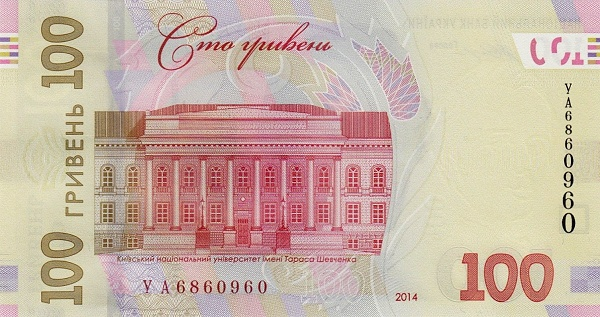
Red University Building on the reverse of 100 hryvnias banknote

The Red University Building (Ukrainian: Червоний корпус Київського університету, romanized: Chervonyi korpus Kyivskoho universytetu) is the principal and oldest 4-story building of the Kyiv University located at 60 Volodymyrska Street in Kyiv, the capital of Ukraine. This building is a famous symbol of the Kyiv University and the Ukrainian fundamental higher educational system.

== History ==
It was constructed from 1837 to 1843 and was built in a late Russian Classicism style by Vincent I. Beretti, a Russian architect of Italian origin, from 1837 to 1843. The building forms an enormous figure enclosing a courtyard, and the length of the facade is 145.68 metres (478.0 ft). The walls of the building are painted red and the heads and bases of the columns are painted black, corresponding to the colors of the stripes on the Order of St. Vladimir (founded in 1782), as Kyiv University used to bear the name of this Order. The motto of the Order, "Benefit, honor and glory" became the motto of Kyiv University. Local tour guides sometime state that Tsar Nicholas II ordered the entire main building painted red in response to student conscription protests during World War I to remind students of blood spilled by Ukrainian soldiers. The legend does not reflect the historical fact, however, as the building was painted red long before WWI, in 1842. Built on the top of a hill, the building significantly influenced Kyiv’s architectural layout in the 19th century.

Colloquially referred to as the Red Corps, the building was nearly hit by a rocket during the 2022 Russian Invasion of Ukraine, an event captured close-up by smartphone video.
