= Antireticular cytotoxic serum =

Anti-reticular Cytotoxic Serum (ACS), also called Bogomolets serum, was an antiserum developed in the Soviet Union by Alexander A. Bogomolets in the 1930s for the purpose of disease treatment and lifespan extension. ACS consists of horse, rabbit or goat antiserum raised against human spleen and bone marrow tissue. Although scientists in the United States were initially interested in the antiserum, interest diminished after several studies in the 1940s showed no convincing evidence of benefit.

== Sources ==
- World Book Encyclopedia, 1967 edition, p. 28
