= Oleg Krishtal =

Ukrainian neurophysiologist (born 1945)

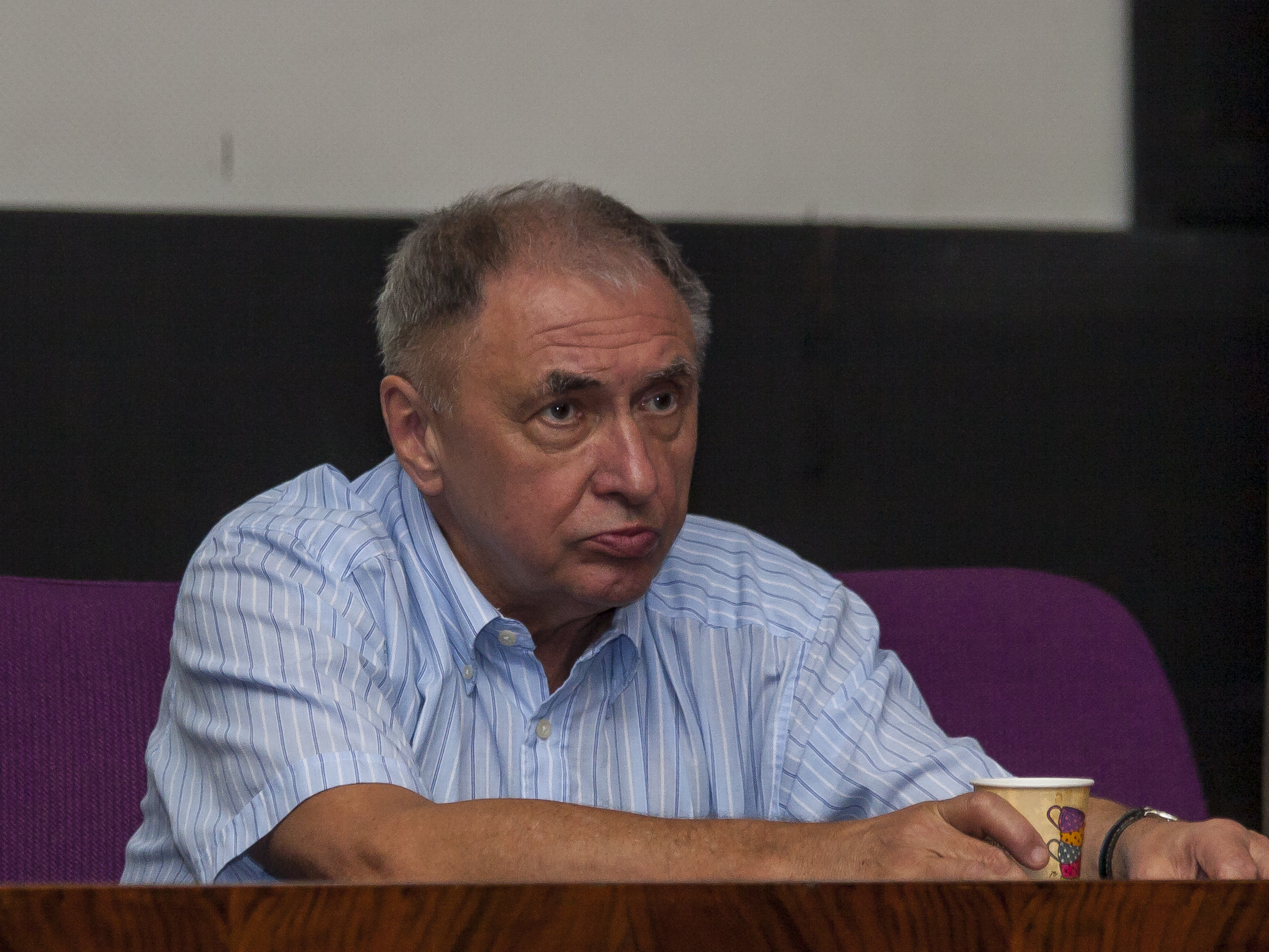
- Born: July 5, 1945 (age 81); Kyiv
- Citizenship: Ukraine
- Education: Taras Shevchenko National University of Kyiv
- Organization: Bogomoletz Institute of Physiology
- Known for: discovery of acid-sensing ion channels, P2X purinoreceptors, one of the most cited Ukrainian scientists
- Scientific career
- Doctoral advisor: Platon Kostiuk

Oleg Oleksandrovych Krishtal (born in 1945, Kyiv) is a scientist in the field of biophysics, a full member of the National Academy of Sciences of Ukraine (1997), a member of Academia Europaea (1990), Doctor of Biological Sciences (1981), and professor (1983). He is a laureate of the State Prize of the USSR and Ukraine in science and technology and one of the most cited Ukrainian scientists.

== Biography ==
Oleg Krishtal was born on July 5, 1945, in Kyiv, into the family of biologist-scientist Oleksandr Pylypovych Krishtal, a professor and head of the Department of Invertebrate Physiology at Taras Shevchenko National University of Kyiv.

In 1968, he graduated from the Faculty of Physics at Taras Shevchenko National University of Kyiv, majoring in "Molecular Physics".

Since 1970, he has been working at Bogomoletz Institute of Physiology, starting as a junior research fellow and later becoming a senior research fellow. Since 1982, he has been heading the Department of Cellular Membranology. From 2003 to 2010, he served as the deputy director of the O.O. Bogomoletz Institute of Physiology, NAS of Ukraine. From 2010 to 2021, he was the director of the institute. Also, from 2010 to 2016, he headed the International Center for Molecular Physiology.

At different times, he has worked as a visiting professor at Kyushu University (Japan), Harvard University (USA), Complutense University of Madrid (Spain), and the University of Pennsylvania (USA).

== Scientific activity ==
Krishtal is a co-author of the development of the method of intracellular dialysis of nerve cells, which made it possible to study their electrophysiological properties. He also discovered two fundamentally new receptors in nerve cells: acid-sensing ion channels and ionotropic receptors for ATP.

He is a member of the editorial board of the journals "Fiziologichnyi Zhurnal" (Bogomoletz Institute of Physiology), "Neurophysiology" (Bogomoletz Institute of Physiology and Springer-Nature), and "Membranes: Membranes in Life Sciences" (MDPI).

For many years, research of Oleg Krishtal has focused on the role of membrane proteins, mainly ion channels and metabotropic receptors, in the functioning of single neurons, neural networks, and whole organs. The current research topics of his department are:

- biophysical and pharmacological properties of ion channels and receptors of cellular membranes (plasmalemma and nuclear envelope);
- molecular mechanisms of epilepsy and epileptogenesis and pharmacological agents with antiseizure properties;
- the role of membrane receptors and ion channels in synaptic plasticity, learning, and integral activity of the nervous system and behavior;
- peripheral and central mechanisms of pain and possible ways of its correction;
- the use of stem cells for the treatment of neurological disorders (Alzheimer's, Parkinson's disease, epilepsy, and ischemic stroke), and traumatic injuries of the spinal cord.

== Writer ==
Kryshtal is also the author of several books:

- "Homunculus" ("Moi et mon double")
- "To the Singing of Birds"
- "I and WE: An Optimistic Scenario"
- Essay "Mozart's Window"

== Public activity ==
Krishtal serves as the president of the Ukrainian Scientific Club, the Ukrainian Physiological Society named after P.G. Kostiuk, and the Ukrainian Society for Neuroscience. He gives many popular science lectures and appears as a guest on radio and television programs.
