= Evdokia Romanova =

Russian human rights activist (born 1990)

Evdokia Romanova (born 30 April 1990) is a human rights activist, who has campaigned on sexual and reproductive health and rights (SRHR) and LGBTQI issues in Russia. She was prosecuted under Russia's “homosexual propaganda law” in 2017.

== Early life and education ==
Evdokia Romanova (Dunia) was born in Kuibishev (Samara since 1991), USSR. She studied at Samara State University (BA in sociology) and the University of Texas at El Paso (MA in sociology). She works as a social worker and community activist.

== Work and activism ==
Dunia's human rights activism focuses on people with disability rights, women's rights, refugee rights, sexual and reproductive health and rights. Dunia is a member of the LGBT-rights movement Avers, which provides legal and psychological assistance to the LGBT community and defends the rights of other LGBT groups. She also works with Youth Coalition for Sexual and Reproductive Rights (YCSRR) and the young feminists’ foundation. Dunia has used theatre as a tool for social change, based on the Theatre of the Oppressed methodology of popular community-based education.

Evdokia spoke at the Commission on the Status of Women in March 2018.

== Prosecution ==
On 26 July 2017 Evdokia was called into her local police station on the pretext of having to act as a witness in a case she had never heard of. On arrival, she was instead informed that she was facing legal proceedings for “homosexual propaganda” but denied disclosure of any details of the case against her. Dunia and her lawyer were refused any details about her case for weeks. They were granted access to her case file on 5 September 2017, only days before the trial.

On 18 October 2017, Evdokia was prosecuted with the administrative offence of “propaganda of non-traditional sexual relationships among minors using the Internet”. This was on the basis of posts she shared on her private Facebook page in 2015 and 2016, including a Guardian story on Ireland's same sex marriage referendum and a Buzzfeed article about an LGBTI exhibition in St Petersburg. She was fined 50,000 roubles (US$870).

Following her arrest, Dunia struggled with a loss of confidence and self-esteem as she shut down her social media accounts. She paid the fine, but is now appealing the decision.
