= Aleksandr Bogomolets =

Soviet-Ukrainian pathophysiologist (1881–1946)

Oleksandr Bogomolets
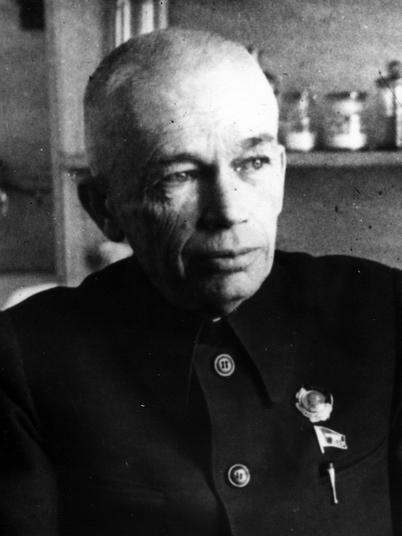
- Born: Oleksandr Oleksandrovych Bogomolets; 24 May 1881; Kiev, Russian Empire
- Died: 19 July 1946 (aged 65); Kiev, Ukrainian SSR, Soviet Union
- Citizenship: Soviet Union
- Education: Novorossiysky University
- Known for: President of the National Academy of Sciences of Ukraine (1930–1946)
- Scientific career
- Fields: pathophysiology

Oleksandr Oleksandrovych Bogomolets (Ukrainian: Олександр Олександрович Богомолець; Russian: Александр Александрович Богомолец, romanized: Aleksandr Aleksandrovich Bogomolets; 24 May 1881 – 19 July 1946) was a Soviet and Ukrainian pathophysiologist.

His father was the physician and revolutionary Oleksandr Mykhailovych Bogomolets (1850–1935).

He was president of the National Academy of Sciences of Ukraine and director of the Institute of clinical Physiology in Kyiv. In 1911-1925 he work in Saratov University, 1925–1931 in Moscow University. His laboratories were located in Georgia, where he had a permanent research unit attached to the Academy of Sciences (1937). According to Zhores Medvedev, this was made possible by Stalin, who wanted members of the Experimental Institute to study the extension of life expectancy. He developed antireticular cytotoxic serum. In 1938, in Kyiv, Oleksandr Bogomolets convened the world's first scientific conference on aging and longevity.

== Awards ==
- Hero of Socialist Labour (4 February 1944) – for outstanding achievements in science, to create valuable products for the treatment of wounds and bone fractures
- Two Orders of Lenin
- Order of the Patriotic War, 1st class
- Order of the Red Banner of Labour
- Medal "For Valiant Labour in the Great Patriotic War 1941–1945"
- Stalin Prize, 1st class (1941)

== Legacy ==
- Bogomolets National Medical University (NMU) is a medical school founded in 1841 in Kyiv, Russian Empire by the Russian Tsar Nicolas I. The university is named after Bogomolets.
- Akademika Bohomoltsia Street (lit. 'Academician Bohomolets Street') is a street in Kyiv named after him

== Books ==
- The Prolongation of Life, by Oleksandr O. Bogomolets. Translated by Peter V. Karpovich, M.D., and Sonia Bleeker, Bogomolets, O. O. (Oleksandr Oleksandrovych), 1881–1946, New York, Essential Books, Duell, Sloan & Pearce, Inc. [1946] ASIN B0006DJ43K

== Articles ==
- "Alexander Alexandrovich Bogomolets: biography, scientific works, the basics of the theory". en.sodiummedia.com.

Preceded by Danylo Zabolotny	President of NANU; 1930–1946	Succeeded by Oleksandr Palladin
