= Cells (journal) =

- Discipline: Cytology
- Language: English
- Edited by: Cord Brakebusch; Alexander E. Kalyuzhny

Publication details
- History: 2012–present
- Publisher: MDPI
- Frequency: Monthly
- Open access: Yes
- License: CC BY
- Impact factor: 5.1 (2023)

Standard abbreviations
- ISO 4: Cells

Indexing
- ISSN: 2073-4409
- OCLC no.: 823191591

Links
- Journal homepage

Cells is a monthly peer-reviewed open-access scientific journal that covers all aspects of cell and molecular biology, and biophysics. It was established in 2012 and is published by MDPI. The founding editor-in-chief is Alexander E. Kalyuzhny (University of Minnesota) who was joined by Cord Brakebusch (University of Copenhagen) in 2020.

== Abstracting and indexing ==
The journal is abstracted and indexed in:

- Biological Abstracts
- BIOSIS Previews
- EBSCO databases
- Embase
- Index Medicus/MEDLINE/PubMed
- Science Citation Index Expanded
- Scopus

According to the Journal Citation Reports, the journal has a 2023 impact factor of 5.1.
