= Bogomolets Institute of Physiology =

Research institute in Kyiv, Ukraine

Coordinates: 50.4405°N 30.5309°E

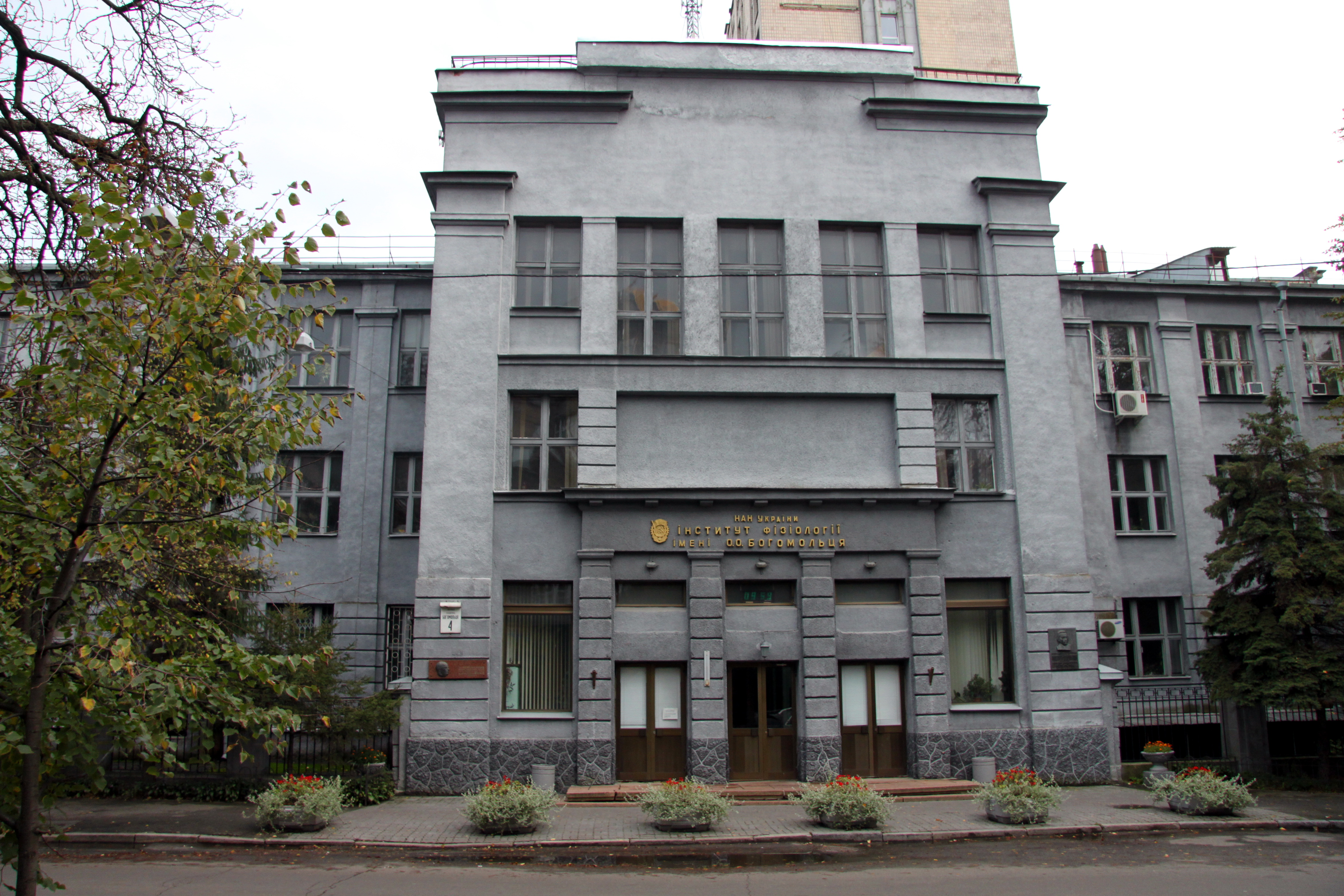
- Administrative building of the Bogomolets Institute
- Founder: Alexander A. Bogomolets
- Established: 1934
- director: Nickolai Veselovsky
- Owner: National Academy of Science of Ukraine
- Location: Kyiv, Ukraine
- Website: biph.kiev.ua/en/Main_Page

Immovable Monument of National Significance of Ukraine
- Official name: Комплекс садиби Інституту фізіології імені О. О. Богомольця НАН України (Complex of the grounds of the Bohomolets Institute of Physiology of NAS of Ukraine)
- Type: History
- Reference no.: 260005-Н

The A. A. Bogomolets Institute of Physiology (Ukrainian: Інститут фізіології імені О. О. Богомольця, romanized: Instytut fiziolohii imeni O. O. Bohomoltsia) is a scientific institution of the National Academy of Sciences of Ukraine dedicated to biomedical research in the fields of physiology, biophysics, pathophysiology, neuroscience. It is a leading research center in Ukraine for neuroscience, electrophysiology and cardiovascular diseases.

== History ==
Predecessors of BIPH were the Institute of clinical physiology of the Academy of Sciences of Ukrainian SSR (established 9 May 1934) and the Institute of experimental biology and pathology of Ministry of Health of Ukrainian SSR (established 1930). Both institutions were led by Ukrainian and Soviet physiologist Alexander A. Bogomolets, who was also president of Academy of Sciences of Ukrainian SSR.

Institutions were united in 1953 and named after Bogomolets.

BIPH became a prominent center for cellular physiology under its long-standing director Platon Kostiuk who was in charge in 1966–2010. Kostiuk and his students were first to measure calcium currents through neuron soma, distinguish between low-voltage activated calcium channels and high-voltage ones, discover ATP-receptors and ASIC-mediated currents.

== Journals ==
There are several peer-reviewed journals published by the Institute.

Since 1955 "Fiziologychnyi Zhurnal" (for Ukrainian "Physiological Journal") has been published. Its first editor was Ivan Pavlov's student Georgiy Volbort. Abstracts of articles are present in PubMed and MEDLINE databases.

Since 2010 Begell House publisher started to publish "International Journal of Physiology and Pathophysiology" containing the best articles from "Fiziologychnyi Zhurnal".

Since 1969 "Neurophysiology" journal was established by Platon Kostiuk, which was the first scientific journal dedicated to neuroscience in Soviet Union (ISSN 0028-2561). It was translated into English by Plenum Publishing Corp. (ISSN 0090-2977)

== Notable alumni ==
- Alexander G. Obukhov, biologist

== Sources ==
- Н. С. Веселовский; Ю. П. Лиманский; А. Н. Шевкр (2009). "Институт физиологии им. А. А. Богомольца НАН Украины - флагман исследований молекулярной и клеточной физиологии мозга (к 75-летию основания института)" (PDF). Нейрофизиология/NEUROPHYSIOLOGY. 41 (2): 99–112.

Media related to Bogomoletz Institute of Physiology at Wikimedia Commons
