= Platon Kostiuk =

Ukrainian biologist (1924–2010)

Hero of Ukraine Platon Kostiuk
- Платон Костюк
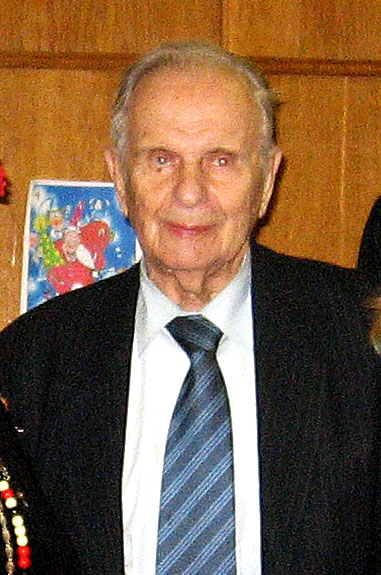
- Kostiuk in 2007
- Born: Platon Hryhorovych Kostiuk; 20 August 1924; Kyiv, Ukrainian SSR, Soviet Union
- Died: 10 May 2010 (aged 85); Kyiv, Ukraine
- Citizenship: USSR (1924–1991); Ukraine (1991–2010)
- Education: Taras Shevchenko National University of Kyiv; Bohomolets National Medical University
- Spouse: Lyudmyla Kostyuk (1929–2011)
- Children: Olena (1957–2011); Olga (1966)
- Awards: Hero of Ukraine
- Scientific career
- Fields: Physiology
- Workplaces: Taras Shevchenko National University of Kyiv; Bogomoletz Institute of Physiology; John Curtin School of Medical Research, Australian National University; Moscow Institute of Physics and Technology, Kyiv branch
- Thesis: Nerve adaptation to expanding current (1949)
- Doctoral advisor: Danylo Vorontsov
- Notable students: Galyna Skibo, Alexei Verkhratsky

Chairman of the Supreme Soviet of the Ukrainian SSR
- In office 1985–1990
- Preceded by: Kostiantyn Sytnyk
- Succeeded by: Vladimir Ivashko

Platon Hryhorovych Kostiuk (Ukrainian: Платон Григорович Костюк; 20 August 1924 – 10 May 2010) was a Soviet and Ukrainian physiologist, neurobiologist, electrophysiologist, and biophysicist. He was a member (academician) of the National Academy of Sciences (NAS) of Ukraine and the Russian Academy of Sciences. He was also a director of the Bogomoletz Institute of Physiology and the International Center of Molecular Physiology NAS of Ukraine; chair of the Moscow Institute of Physics and Technology, Kyiv branch, vice-president of the NAS of Ukraine, and chairman of the Verkhovna Rada of the Ukrainian SSR.

== Biography ==
Platon Kostiuk was born in Kyiv to the family of the Ukrainian psychologist Hryhoriy Kostiuk. A native speaker of both Ukrainian and Russian, Kostiuk studied English and German, and graduated from high school when the German–Russian War began in 1941. Kostiuk entered Stalingrad University to study biology and Roman philology. He was later evacuated to Siberia, where he studied medicine till 1945. After half a year of military medical service, he was demobilized for entry into the Department of Biology at Kyiv University. In parallel, he studied psychiatry at Kyiv Medical Institute. Kostiuk worked on his doctoral thesis in Danylo Vorontsov's laboratory of physiology. In his research, he developed microelectrode equipment independently of Judith Graham Pool and Ralph W. Gerard (1949). He completed his doctoral thesis in 1957. In 1958, Kostiuk became Head of the Department of General Nervous System Physiology at the Bogomoletz Institute of Physiology. From 1969 to 2010, he served as the director of the institute.

In 1960–61, Kostiuk was invited to John Eccles' Laboratory in Canberra, Australia to study the mechanisms of synaptic inhibition in the spinal cord. In 1974, he was elected a member (academician) of the Soviet Academy of Science. In 1975–1988, he was the academician-secretary of the Section of Physiology of the academy. In 1975–1990, he was also a deputy in the Verkhovna Rada of the Ukrainian SSR and in 1985–90 was its chairman.

== Research ==
Platon Kostiuk was the first to introduce microelectrode studies of the nervous system in the USSR. He was the first to prove directly the presence of calcium channels in neuronal cell membranes. Under his supervision, two types of calcium currents were discovered: high-voltage activated and low-voltage activated. He also proposed an original hypothesis on calcium channels' selectivity mechanism.

== Awards and chairs ==
Kostiuk was a vice-president of the International Union for Physiologycal Sciences from 1989 to 1993.

In 1966, he was elected a Member of the German National Academy of Sciences Leopoldina.

== In memoriam ==
Kostiuk students established Kostiuk Foundation to support young scientists and promote physiological research in Ukraine. Once a year, the Foundation presents Kostiuk Award to outstanding young researchers in the field of biomedical sciences.

== Publications ==
He published more than 1000 scientific papers in Ukrainian, Russian, and English. Some of the most important include:

- Kostyuk, P. G.; Eccles, J.С.; Schmidt, R. F. (1962). "Central pathways responsible for depolarization of primary afferent fibres". The Journal of Physiology. 65 (2): 237–257. doi:10.1113/jphysiol.1962.sp006884. PMC 1359621. PMID 13889054.
- Kostyuk, P. G.; Araki, T.; Ito, M.; Oscarsson, O. (1962). "Injection of alcaline cations into cat spinal motoneurones". Nature. 196 (4861): 1319–1320. Bibcode:1962Natur.196.1319A. doi:10.1038/1961319a0. PMID 14013543. S2CID 4257533.
- Kostyuk, P. G.; Krishtal, O.A.; Pidoplichko, V.I. (1975). "Effect of internal fluoride and phosphate on membrane currents during intracellular dialysis of nerve cells". Nature. 257 (2): 691–693. Bibcode:1975Natur.257..691K. doi:10.1038/257691a0. PMID 1186845. S2CID 1354301.
- Kostyuk, PG; Molokanova, EA; Pronchuk, NF; Savchenko, AN; Verkhratsky, AN (December 1992). "Different action of ethosuximide on low- and high-threshold calcium currents in rat sensory neurons". Neuroscience. 51 (4): 755–8. doi:10.1016/0306-4522(92)90515-4. PMID 1336826. S2CID 41451332.

| Preceded by Kostiantyn Sytnyk | Chairman of the Verkhovna Rada of the Ukrainian SSR; 1985 - 1990 | Succeeded by Vladimir Ivashko (acting) |
