= Oleksandr Korniychuk =

Soviet playwright and public servant (1905–1972)

- Олександр Корнійчук
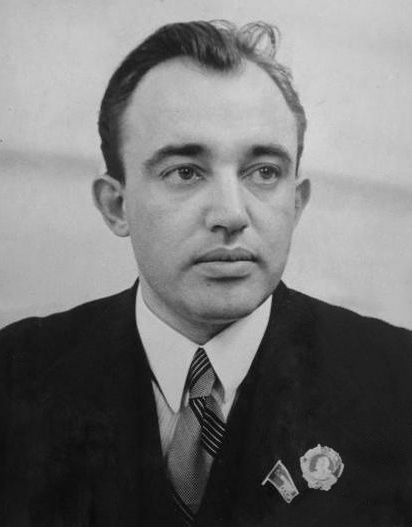
- Korniychuk in 1940

Chairman of the Supreme Soviet of the Ukrainian SSR
- In office 1947–1953
- Preceded by: Mykhailo Burmystenko (1941)
- Succeeded by: Pavlo Tychyna
- In office 1959–1972
- Preceded by: Pavlo Tychyna
- Succeeded by: Mykhailo Bilyi

Minister of Foreign Affairs of the Ukrainian SSR
- In office 1944–1944
- Premier: Nikita Khrushchev
- Preceded by: Christian Rakovsky (1923)
- Succeeded by: Dmytro Manuilsky

Personal details
- Born: 25 May 1905 Khrystynivka, Kiev Governorate, Russian Empire
- Died: 14 May 1972 (aged 66) Kiev, Ukrainian SSR, Soviet Union
- Spouse: Wanda Wasilewska
- Occupation: Playwright; state official
- Awards: Stalin Prize (1941, 1942, 1943, 1949, 1951); Shevchenko National Prize (1971)

Oleksandr Yevdokymovych Korniychuk (Ukrainian: Олександр Євдокимович Корнійчук; Russian: Александр Евдокимович Корнейчук; 25 May [O.S. 12 May] 1905 – 14 May 1972) was a Soviet and Ukrainian playwright, literary critic and state official.

His plays include The Death of the Squadron (1933), Platon Krechet (1934), Bohdan Khmelnytsky (1938), his pro-collectivization comedy In the Steppes of Ukraine (1940), and The Front (1942). Korniychuk was a five-time Stalin Prize laureate (1941; 1942; 1943; 1949; 1951) and is regarded as a major proponent of Socialist Realism in Soviet drama.

Korniychuk served as the head of the People's Commissariat for Foreign Affairs of the Ukrainian SSR from 1943 to 1945. He was also a member of the Central Committee of the Communist Party of the Soviet Union (1952–1972), and the chairman of the Supreme Soviet of the Ukrainian Soviet Socialist Republic (1947–1953; 1959–1972).

== Biography ==
=== Early life ===
Oleksandr Yevdokymovych Korniychuk was born in Khrystynivka, Kiev Governorate, into a family of a railroad workers. At the age of 15, he started working at a railroad carriage repair works. In 1924 Korniychuk enrolled into the Kiev University (then known as the Kiev Institute of People's Education). After the graduation in 1929, he went to work in the Odessa and Kiev film studios, mainly as a script-writer. His debut play On the Edge (1929) examined the role of a man of arts in the new Socialist society. From the late 1920s to early 1930s, Korniychuk was an active propagator of internationalism, strictly opposing the local National Communist movement in the Ukrainian literature, led by Mykola Khvylovy.

=== Literary career ===
In 1933, the first significant play by Korniychuk, Death of the Squadron, came out, endorsing the heroic tale of a Bolshevik Black Sea Fleet unit who chose to sink their ships so as not to be taken by the Germans (later revealed to be nothing more than a romantic revolutionary myth). The play impressed Pavel Postyshev, who became the 'local prodigy''s mentor. Platon Krechet followed in 1934, its central character representing the 'new Soviet intelligentsia', driven by "humanism and justice-seeking". The 1937 play Pravda is credited for being the first one to introduce the character of Lenin to the Soviet theatre stage.

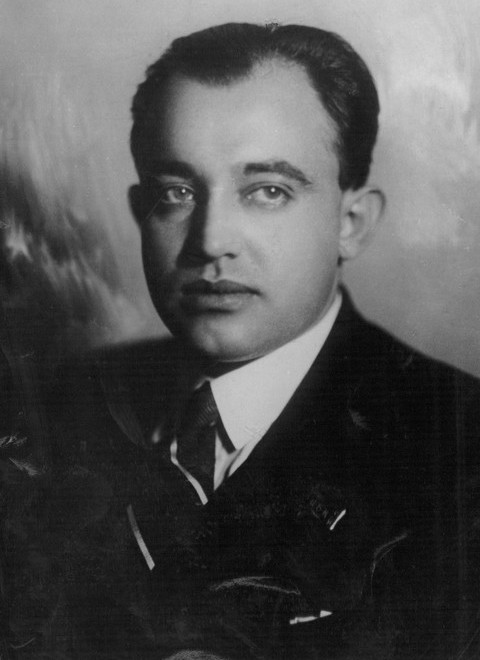
Korniychuk in 1938

Both Nikita Khrushchev and Lazar Kaganovich recommended the young author to Stalin and in 1938, the Soviet leader met the playwright at the Kremlin. Soon Korniychuk's plays were translated into most of the Soviet republics' languages and started to be produced by theatres all over the country. In 1939 came out what in retrospect is regarded by Russian critics as Korniychuk's strongest work, the 5-act drama Bogdan Khmelnitsky, telling the story of the 17th-century national movement in Ukraine which resulted in the country's unification with Russia. His 1941 pro-collectivisation farcical comedy In the Steppes of Ukraine became popular with both the general public and Stalin himself, who in a personal letter informed the author: "Comrade Korneychuk. Just read your play In the Steppes of Ukraine. Laughed heartily. I.Stalin". Korniychuk continued in the same vein with Please Come to Zvonkovoye (1946), The Kalinov Grove (1950) and Over Dnieper (1960).

In 1934, at the First Congress of the Soviet Union of Writers Korniychuk was elected a member of its chairmanship board. The same year, he became the leader of the Ukrainian SSR Union of Writers (1934–1941, 1946–1953).

=== Second World War ===
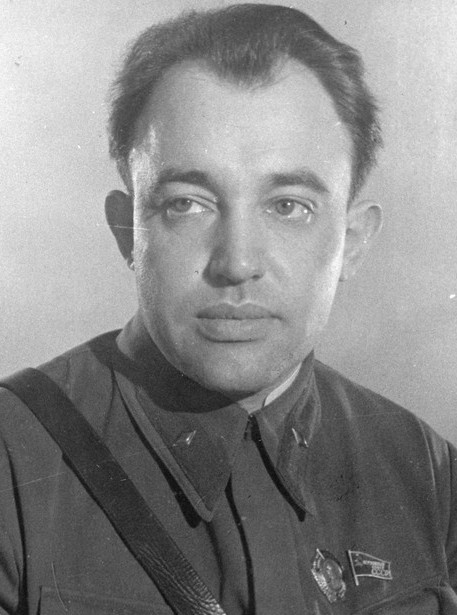
Korniychuk in military uniform during WW2, 1942

As World War II broke out in 1941, Korniychuk went to the frontline, first as a war correspondent, then a politruk. His 1942 play Frontline, criticizing the 'old style' army generals caused outrage among the latter but was supported by Stalin ("Conduct the war in better ways and there won't be such plays," he reportedly told some of the disgruntled senior rank military men). For it the author received his third Stalin Prize, promptly donating the money to the needs of national defense.

On 19 February 1943, the Ukrainian government newspaper Radyans'ka Ukraina in (briefly) liberated Kharkov published an article written by Korniychuk making it clear Stalin had no intention of giving up most of the territory gained by the Molotov–Ribbentrop pact after the war: it was promptly reprinted in Russian by Pravda the following day. In 1944, Korniychuk became the first head (People's Comissar) of the Ukrainian SSR's newly formed Foreign Ministry (Narodny Comissariat, as it was then known). From 1943 to 1945, he was the first deputy of the Foreign Minister of the USSR.

=== Later life and career ===
In the late 1940s, Korniychuk joined the higher ranks of the Ukrainian and Soviet political nomenclature. He was a member of the Communist Party's Central committees (USSR - 1949–1972, UkrSSR - 1952–1972), a Supreme Soviet of the Soviet Union deputy (1937–1972), the first deputy of the UkrSSR Prime Minister (1953–1954), the Chairman of the Ukrainian parliament (in 1947–1953, 1959–1972).

Korniychuk received his share of ideological chastising too. In 1951 the libretto for Konstantyn Dankevych's opera Bogdan Khmelnitsky he'd written with his wife Wanda Wasilewska met with harsh disapproval from Stalin, who demanded for a lot more of the Ukrainian people's fight against the "Polish oppression" to be shown. The pair added several scenes, making a point to emphasize the "historical roots of the Russian-Ukrainian friendship," and the opera was premiered in 1953. In 1954 Korniychuk's play Wings, satirizing the style of local party officials' leadership, outraged some members of the USSR CP Central Committee. Khrushchev had to intervene, allegedly saying: "The Tsar hadn't banned Gogol's Revizor, how can we then ban Korneychuk's Wings?"

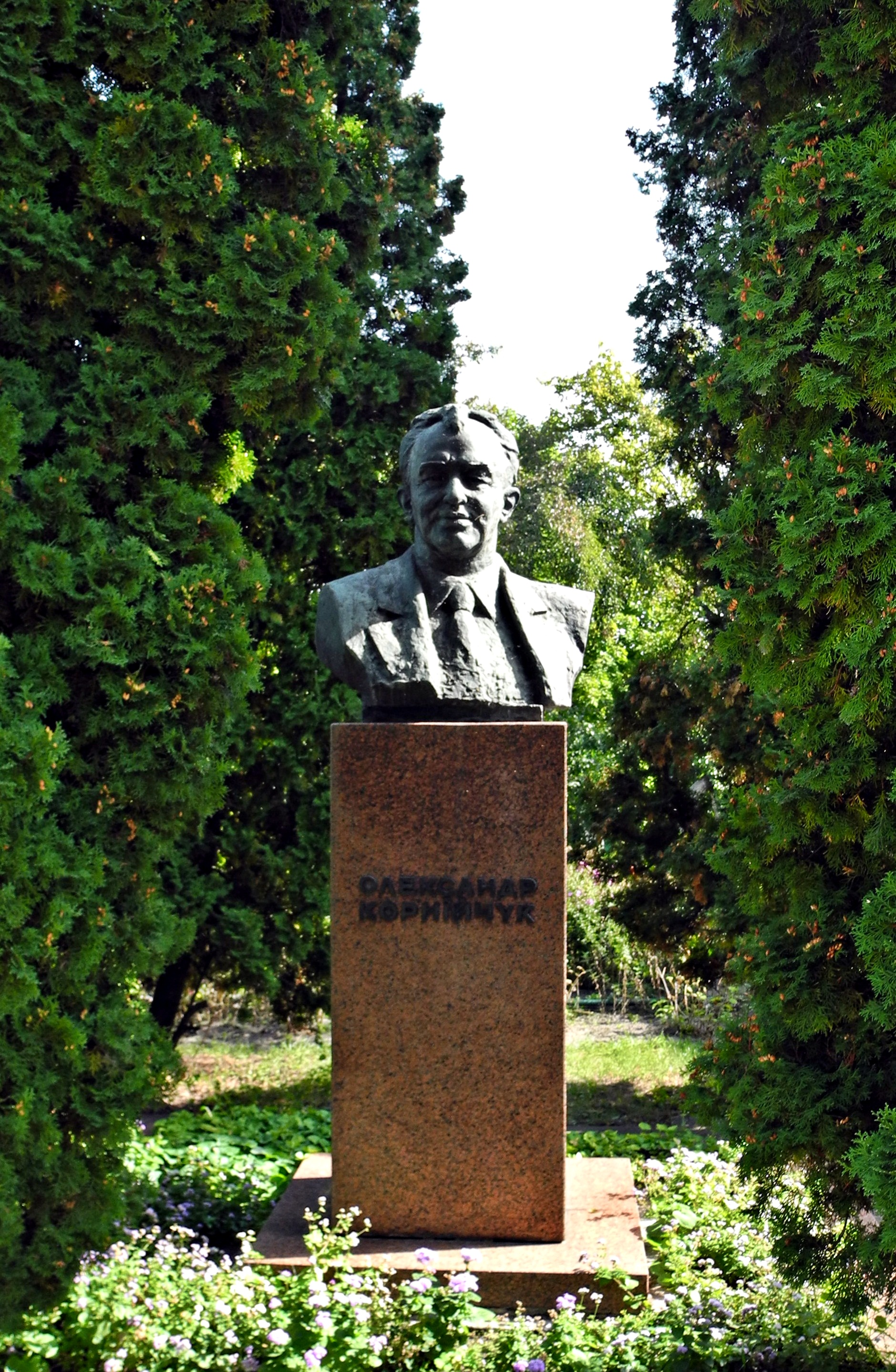
Monument to Oleksandr Korniychuk in Pliuty

Korniychuk's works of the 1960s showed less ideological fervour and more psychological depth, dealing with the Soviet people's moral dilemmas in the post-War Soviet Russia.

Olexandr Korniychuk died on 14 May 1972 in Kiev. He was buried at the Baikove Cemetery.

There is a street in Moscow named after Korniychuk (1976).

== Plays ==
- On the Edge (Na Grani, 1926)
- The Stone Island (Kamyannyi ostriv, 1930)
- The Assault (Shturm, 1930)
- Violet Pike (Fioletova shchuka, 1932)
- The Death of the Squadron (Zahybel eskadry, 1933)
- Platon Kretchet (1934) – Stalin Prize first degree (1941)
- The Banker (Bankir, 1936)
- Pravda (1937)
- Bogdan Khmelnytsky (1939 )– Stalin Prize first degree (1941)
- In the Steppes of Ukraine (V stepakh Ukrayiny, 1941) – Stalin Prize first degree (1942)
- Partisans in the Steppes of Ukraine (Partyzany v stepakh Ukrayiny, 1942)
- Frontline (Front, 1942) – Stalin Prize first degree (1943)
- Mister Perkins’ Mission in the Bolshevik State (Missiya mistera Perkinsa v krayinu bilshovykiv, 1944)
- Please Come to Dzvinkove (Pryizhdzhayte v Dzvinkove, 1946)
- Makar Dibrova (1948) – Stalin Prize second degree (1949)
- Kalynovyi Hai (1950) – Stalin Prize third degree (1951)
- Wings (Kryla, 1954)
- Why Did Stars Smile (Chomu posmikhalysya zori, 1957)
- Over Dnieper (Nad Dniprom, 1960)
- The Diary Page (Storinka shchodennyka, 1964)
- The Cost to Pay (Rozplata, 1965)
- My Friends (Moyi druzi, 1967)
- Memory of the Heart (Pamyat serdtsya, 1969) – Shevchenko National Prize (1971)

Political offices
Preceded by Mykola Kompaniets	Chairman of Art Affair Committee; 1944 – 1946	Succeeded by Mykola Kompaniets
Vacant joined Soviet Union Title last held by Christian Rakovsky	Minister of Foreign Affairs; 1944 – 1944	Succeeded by Dmytro Manuilsky
Preceded by Mykhailo Burmystenko	Chairman of the Verkhovna Rada; 1947 – 1953	Succeeded by Pavlo Tychyna
Preceded by Pavlo Tychyna	Chairman of the Verkhovna Rada; 1959 – 1972	Succeeded by Mykhailo Bilyi
Cultural offices
Preceded by position created	Shevchenko National Prize Committee Chair; 1961 – 1972	Succeeded by Mykola Shamota
