= Kostiantyn Sytnyk =

Ukrainian scientist and academician (1926–2017)

- Костянтин Ситник
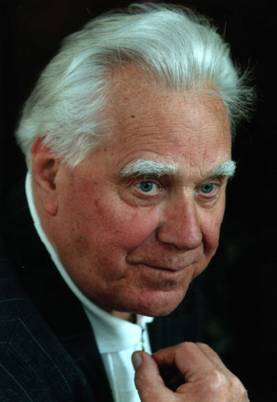
- Sytnyk in 2012

Chairman of the Supreme Soviet of the Ukrainian SSR
- In office 1980–1985
- Preceded by: Mykhailo Bilyi
- Succeeded by: Platon Kostiuk

Director of the Botanic Institute (NANU)
- In office 1970–2003
- Preceded by: Alfred Oksner
- Succeeded by: Yakiv Didukh

Personal details
- Born: Kostiantyn Merkuriyovych Sytnyk; 3 June 1926 Luhanske, Luhansk Okruha, Ukrainian SSR, USSR
- Died: 22 July 2017 (aged 91) Kyiv, Ukraine
- Party: Ukrainian Platform "Sobor"
- Other political affiliations: All-Union Communist Party (bolsheviks) (1982–90); People's Democratic Party (1996–99)

Kostiantyn Merkuriyovych Sytnyk (Ukrainian: Костянтин Меркурійович Ситник; 3 June 1926 – 22 July 2017) was a Ukrainian and Soviet scientist and academician, a member of the National Academy of Sciences of Ukraine who in 1970-2003 was director of the Botanic Institute of the National Academy of Sciences of Ukraine. Sytnyk also worked as a politician, and served as the Chairman of the Verkhovna Rada of the Ukrainian Soviet Socialist Republic from 1980 to 1985.

== Early life and scientific career ==
Sytnyk was born on 3 June 1926 in the city of Luhansk, which was then part of the Ukrainian SSR in the Soviet Union. In 1949, he graduated from the Luhansk Pedagogigcal Institute, and afterwords he began working as an assistant at the institute before in 1950 beginning to work at the National Academy of Sciences of Ukraine. In 1962, he was promoted to Head of the Scientific-Organizational Department and in 1966 to Chief Scientific Secretary, before in 1970 being appointed Director of the Botanic Institute. Simultaneously, he was an Academician-Secretary of General Biology from 1972 to 1984 and Vice-President and later First Vice-President of NASU from 1974 to 1988.

During his time at the institute, he primarily worrked on genetic and cellular engineering of plants in Ukraine, phythormonal regulations, and he co-discovered the biparental inheritance of plasmogens. He also helped author the experiment that sent Leonid Kadenyuk to space, and studied the genus Achillea. For these activities, he was awarded the USSR State Prize and the Ukrainian SSR State Prize.

Political offices
Preceded by Mykhailo Bilyi	Chairman of the Verkhovna Rada; 1980-1985	Succeeded by Platon Kostiuk
