= Mykhailo Bilyi =

Ukrainian and Soviet physicist and politician

- Михайло Білий

Chairman of the Supreme Soviet of the Ukrainian SSR
- In office 1972–1980
- Preceded by: Oleksandr Korniychuk
- Succeeded by: Kostiantyn Sytnyk

Rector of the Kyiv University
- In office 1970–1985
- Preceded by: Ivan Shvets
- Succeeded by: Viktor Skopenko

Personal details
- Born: 12 November 1922 Moskali, Chernihiv Governorate, Ukrainian SSR
- Died: 5 August 2001 (aged 78) Kyiv, Ukraine
- Party: All-Union Communist Party (bolsheviks)

Mykhailo Ulyanovych Bilyi (Ukrainian: Михайло Улянович Білий; 12 November 1922 – 5 August 2001) was a Ukrainian and Soviet physicist and politician, who served as the Chairman of the Verkhovna Rada of the Ukrainian Soviet Socialist Republic from 1972 to 1980. Since 1969 he was a Corresponding Member of the National Academy of Sciences of Ukraine (then the Academy of Sciences of Ukrainian SSR).

== Biography ==
Mykhailo Bilyi was born on 12 November 1922 in the village of Moskali that today is located in Chernihiv Raion, Northern Ukraine into a peasant family. After graduating from primary school, he served in the Red Army, and served during World War II within the Transcaucasian Military District. However, he was wounded and had to be treated in Baku in May 1943, and thereafter did not return to military service. Starting in 1944, he entered the Faculty of Physics and Mathematics at Azerbaijan University, but transferred in the following year to the Faculty of Physics and Mathematics from Kyiv University.

In 1951, after defendeed his dissertation on the spectra of absorportion of solutions of lead salts to receive his degree of Candidate of Physical and Mathematical Sciences, he began working as a professor at Kyiv University. In 1962 he was promoted to the Dean of the Faculty of Physics at Kyiv University, which he served as until 1970. During this time, he became a Corresponding Member of the National Academy of Sciences of Ukraine. He then became Rector of Kyiv University, a position he held for 15 years until 1985.

Political offices
Preceded by Oleksandr Korniychuk	Chairman of the Verkhovna Rada; 1972-1980	Succeeded by Kostiantyn Sytnyk
Educational offices
Preceded by Ivan Shvets	Rector of St.Vladimir Kyiv University; 1970–1985	Succeeded by Viktor Skopenko
