= Bibirevo ethnographic village =

Park in Moscow, Russia

- Russian: Этнографи́ческая дере́вня Би́бирево
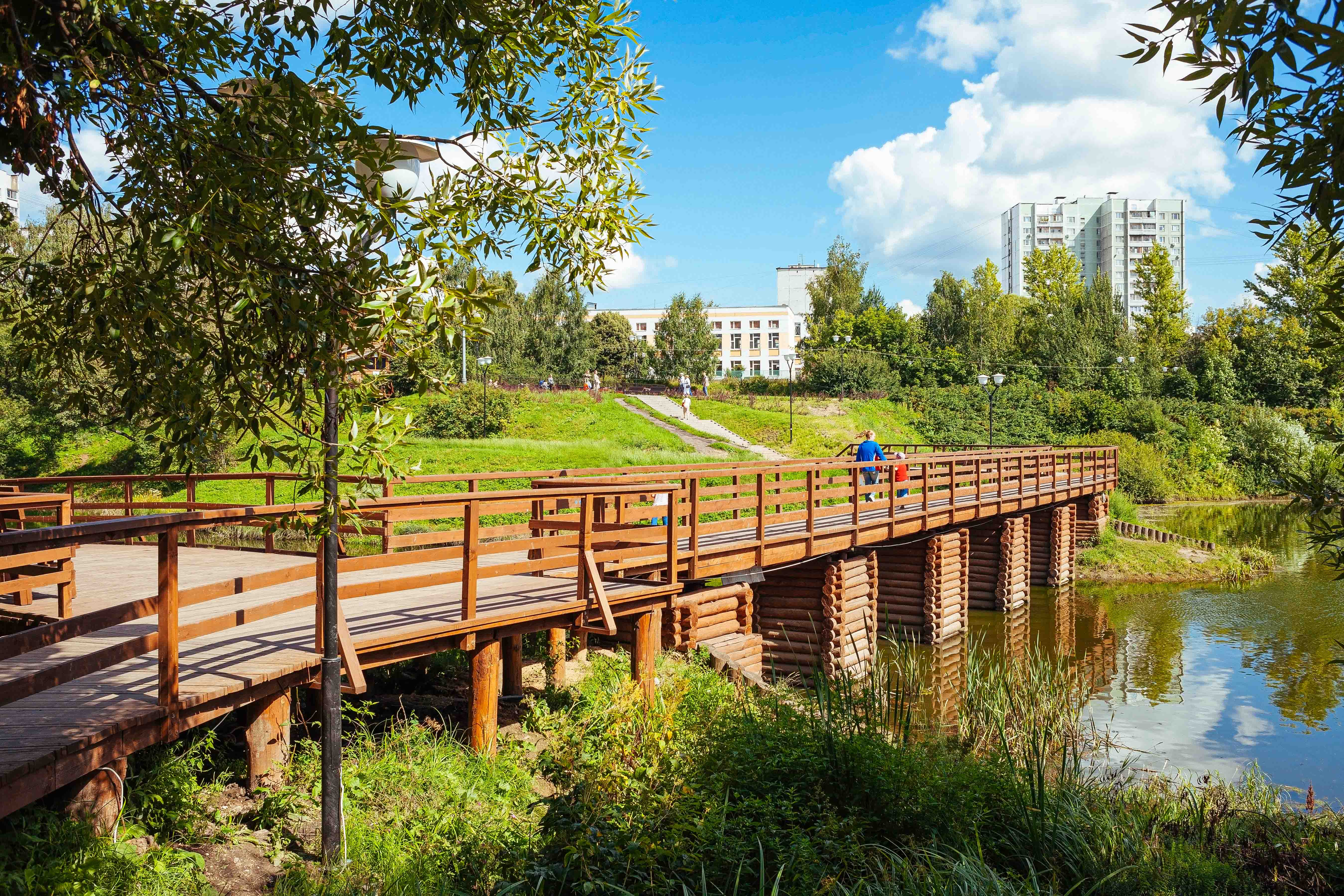
- Interactive map of Bibirevo ethnographic village
- Location: Bibirevo District
- Nearest city: Moscow
- Coordinates: 55.8953°N 37.6217°E
- Area: 9.58 ha (23.7 acres)
- Open: 2004
- Status: Open

External image
- Ethnographic village Bibirevo at beginning of 2000s

Bibirevo ethnographic village (Russian: Этнографическая деревня Бибирево) is a park in the "Green zone of the Chermyanka river" in Moscow, stylized as an ethnographic village. The area of the park (green area) is 9.58 ha (23.7 acres), the total area is 12 ha (30 acres). It is located between Belozerskaya, Leskov and Korneychuka Streets in Bibirevo District.

== History ==
In the 19th century, this territory was home to the village of Podushkino with 27 yards, where 91 people lived.

In 1983, one of the episodes of the children's newsreel Yeralash was filmed here (37th issue, 1st plot entitled "Ladies and Gentlemen").

Work on the creation of the park began in 2003.

The park was opened on 24 July 2004 in place of an abandoned and swampy territory along the Chermyanka River.

The next stage of the park's reconstruction took place in the summer and autumn of 2012. The slopes were strengthened, paths were paved, stairs, playgrounds for children, a summer amphitheater were built.

== Modernity ==
In the floodplain of the Chermyanka River there is a dam, flower beds, playgrounds and sports grounds, a summer stage, picnic areas. Also, during the reconstruction in 2012, new wooden pedestrian bridges were built across the river, a wooden embankment (footpaths with wooden flooring) along the river.

On the territory of the recreational zone there is a chapel-church in honor of Saints Anthony and Theodosius of Kiev-Pechersk.
