= Supreme Soviet of the Ukrainian Soviet Socialist Republic =

Highest organ of state power of Soviet Ukraine

Supreme Soviet of the Ukrainian SSR Верховна Рада Української РСР (Ukrainian) Верховный Совет Украинской ССР (Russian) Verkhovna Rada Ukrains'koi RSR Verkhovnyy Sovet Ukrainskoy SSR
- (Ukrainian Soviet Socialist Republic) Ukrainian SSR (1937–1941; 1944–1991)
- Emblem of the Ukrainian Soviet Socialist Republic

Type
- Type: Supreme Soviet

History
- Established: 1937; 1947 (re-establishment)
- Disbanded: 1941 (German occupation); 1991
- Preceded by: All-Ukrainian Congress of Soviets
- Succeeded by: Verkhovna Rada

Leadership
- Chairman: Mykhailo Burmystenko (first); Leonid Kravchuk (last)

Elections
- First election: 1938
- Last election: 1990

Meeting place
- Verkhovna Rada building, Soviet Square, Kyiv, Ukrainian SSR, Soviet Union

The Supreme Soviet of the Ukrainian SSR (Ukrainian: Верховна Рада Української РСР, romanized: Verkhovna Rada Ukrainskoi RSR; Russian: Верховный Совет Украинской ССР, romanized: Verkhovny Sovet Ukrainskoy SSR) was the highest organ of state power of Ukraine when it was known as the Ukrainian Soviet Socialist Republic (Ukrainian SSR), one of the union republics of the Soviet Union. The Supreme Soviet was Ukraine's sole branch of government and, per the principle of unified power, all state organs were subservient to it. It was established in 1937 replacing the All-Ukrainian Congress of Soviets.

Before demokratizatsiya, the Supreme Soviet had been characterized as a rubber stamp for the Soviet Ukrainian regime or as only being able to affect issues of low sensitivity and salience to the regime by the Ukrainian Communist Party, similar to all other supreme soviets in the union republics. The 1990 election in Ukraine was the first in the Ukrainian SSR where opposition parties were permitted to run.

== History ==
The first elections for the Supreme Soviet of the Ukrainian SSR were held on 25–28 July 1938. A total of 304 deputies were elected and Mykhailo Burmystenko was elected Chairman of the Supreme Soviet of the Ukrainian SSR.

== List of chairmen ==
After Burmystenko's death in 1941, the position of Chairman of the Supreme Soviet of the Ukrainian SSR was vacant until 1947. The longest-serving Chairman of the Supreme Soviet of the Ukrainian SSR was Oleksandr Korniychuk.

| Portrait | Chairman | From | To |
|---|---|---|---|
| | Mykhailo Burmystenko | 25 July 1938 | 9 September 1941 |
| | Oleksandr Korniychuk | 1947 | 1953 |
| | Pavlo Tychyna | 1953 | 1959 |
| | Oleksandr Korniychuk | 1959 | 1972 |
| | Mykhailo Bilyi | 1972 | 1980 |
| | Kostiantyn Sytnyk | 1980 | 1985 |
| | Platon Kostiuk | 1985 | 4 June 1990 |
| | Vladimir Ivashko | 4 June 1990 | 9 July 1990 |
| | Leonid Kravchuk | 23 July 1990 | 5 December 1991 |

== See also ==
- Declaration of Independence of Ukraine
- Verkhovna Rada
