= Battle of Kiev (1941) =

Battle on the Eastern Front of World War II

Coordinates: 50.4536°N 30.5164°E

- Part of Operation Barbarossa on the Eastern Front of World War II
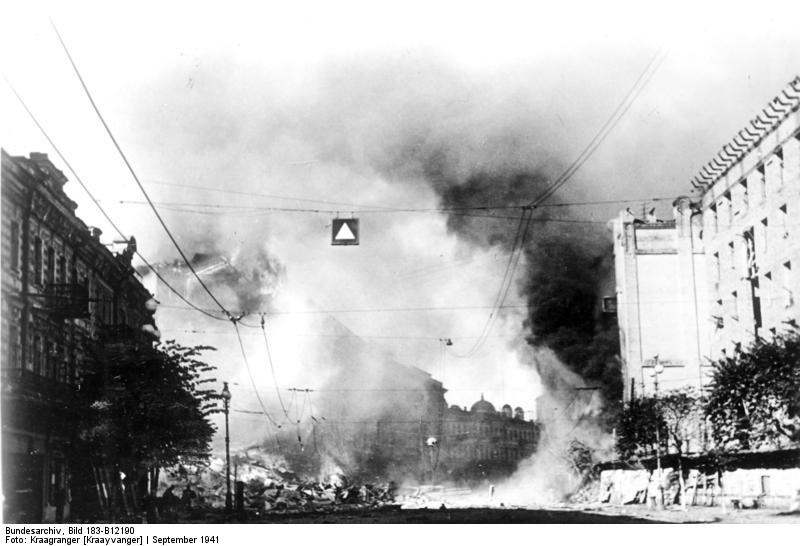
- Explosion of a Soviet radio-mine in Kiev (September 1941)
Date	23 August – 26 September 1941 (1 month and 3 days)
Location	East and south of Kiev, Ukrainian SSR, Soviet Union
Result	German victory; Encirclement and destruction of Soviet Southwestern Front; Beginning of Battle of Moscow
Territorial changes	German occupation of Kiev

Belligerents
Germany	Soviet Union

Commanders and leaders
(Nazi Germany) Gerd von Rundstedt; (Nazi Germany) Walther v. Reichenau; (Nazi Germany) Heinz Guderian; (Nazi Germany) Ewald von Kleist; (Nazi Germany) Eberhard v. Mackensen	(Soviet Union) Semyon Budyonny (Note: Until 13 September); (Soviet Union) Semyon Timoshenko; (Soviet Union) Mikhail Kirponos †; (Soviet Union) Mykhailo Burmystenko †

Strength
25 infantry divisions 9 armoured divisions 544,000	Initial 627,000

Casualties and losses
Total: 128,670 26,856 killed 96,796 wounded 5,018 missing	700,544 men 616,304 killed or missing, including 480,000 prisoners 84,240 wounded and sick 411 tanks and SPGs destroyed 343 aircraft destroyed 28,419 guns and mortars lost

The First Battle of Kiev or Kiev operation, known as the Battle of Kiev on the German side (German: Schlacht bei Kiew), was a major battle that resulted in an encirclement of Soviet troops in the vicinity of Kiev during World War II, the capital and most populous city of the Ukrainian Soviet Socialist Republic. This encirclement is the largest in the history of warfare by number of troops. The battle lasted from 7 July to 26 September 1941 as part of Operation Barbarossa, the Axis invasion of the Soviet Union. Although it is known as the "Battle of Kiev", the city played only a peripheral role in the overall battle; for the Soviets, a strategic defensive operation. The battle took place over a large area in eastern Ukraine, with Kiev being the focal point of Soviet defenses and of the German encirclement.

Much of the Southwestern Front of the Red Army, commanded by Mikhail Kirponos, was encircled, but small groups of Red Army troops managed to escape the pocket in the days after the German panzers attacked east of the city, including the forces of Marshal Semyon Budyonny, Marshal Semyon Timoshenko and Commissar Nikita Khrushchev. Kirponos was trapped behind German lines and was killed while trying to break out.

The battle was an unprecedented defeat for the Red Army, and was more damaging than the Battle of Białystok–Minsk of June–July 1941. The encirclement trapped 452,700 Soviet soldiers, 2,642 guns and mortars, and 64 tanks of which only 15,000 soldiers escaped from the encirclement by 2 October. The Southwestern Front suffered 700,544 casualties, including 616,304 killed, captured, or missing during the battle. The 5th, 37th, 26th, 21st, and 38th armies, consisting of 43 divisions, were almost annihilated and the 40th Army suffered many losses. Like the Western Front before it, the Southwestern Front had to be recreated almost from scratch.

Adolf Hitler, the leader of the Third Reich, described the Battle of Kiev as "the biggest battle in the history of the world", and Joseph Goebbels, the German minister of propaganda, called it "the greatest battle of annihilation of all time". The historian Evan Mawdsley described the battle as the Ostheer's "greatest triumph of the war in the East and the Red Army’s greatest single disaster", and the historian Michael Jones dubbed the battle to be "the Wehrmacht’s greatest victory of the war".

== Prelude ==
=== Plans and preparations ===
According to Barbarossa's operational plan, the Wehrmacht's Army Group South, under the command of Field Marshal Gerd von Rundstedt, was supposed to dominate the strategic area of Ukraine. This force planned to reach the Dnieper river in an enveloping movement by breaking the Soviet border defense and penetrating 650 kilometers deep into Soviet territory, and encircling the main forces of the Red Army in Ukraine west of the river.

Soviet High Command knew that the main focus of German forces in their invasion would be north of the Pripyat marshes, but Soviet leader Joseph Stalin insisted that the Soviet emphasis should be on the south. The Soviet Southwestern Front under the command of General Mikhail Kirponos in Ukraine was the most powerful front in the western border region of the Soviet Union, possessing a total of four field armies, with the support of three mechanized corps in the front line, one mechanized corps in reserve and two mechanized corps in strategic reserve position.

The Pripyat marshes separated the southern part of the operational area of the German forces from the northern part, and eliminated the possibility of receiving help from other German units until after the Kiev area had been secured. The operational area in Ukraine had a greater depth and width than those of the Wehrmacht's other two army groups, and as Kiev was 600 km away from the border, it was considered a farther objective. These issues complicated the manoeuvres of the southern Wehrmacht group.

=== Soviet tank quality ===
When Germany invaded the USSR in 1941, Soviet armored forces included both older tank models and the newer T-34 medium tank. The T-34 was designed to counter the Panzer IV by improving firepower, mobility, and armor. Its development was influenced by flaws in older Soviet tanks, including limitations in armor and firepower.

One of the T-34's main features was its sloped armor, which improved its protection. The tank used a modern suspension system to increase mobility. These features made the T-34 difficult for some German tanks to defeat during the early stages of Operation Barbarossa.

However, the T-34 also had limitations. Its early turret was small, which limited the space available to the crew. Soviet armored forces also experienced difficulties with crew training. These problems reduced the effectiveness of newer Soviet tanks during the German invasion.

=== German and Soviet tank quantities ===
When the invasion of the Soviet Union first began, the Germans advanced 300 miles into Soviet territory within the next few days. Germany deployed approximately 3,400 tanks during the invasion of the Soviet Union. Germany then deployed roughly 500 armored units to Kiev to encircle the city.

According to 19FortyFive, the Soviet Union possessed approximately 900 T-34 tanks when the German invasion began. The Soviet Army had 200 T-34s present at the Battle of Kiev in 1941. Although the T-34 had advantages over some German tanks, the Soviet Union did not produce enough to equip all of its armored battalions. Older Soviet tanks continued to serve alongside the T-34.

The Soviet Union also had more tanks and aircraft during the wider invasion. However, during the Battle of Kiev, Soviet forces had only 400 planes and 500 tanks. The Soviet Army's numerical strength therefore did not mean that every tank had the same capabilities or level of battlefield effectiveness.

=== Consequences ===
The effectiveness of armored forces depended on more than the number of tanks available. German tanks suffered damage during combat, but Soviet forces suffered more casualties than German forces. The Washington Examiner reports that the Soviet Southwestern Front lost approximately 616,000 personnel who were killed, captured, or missing. German advances also complicated the delivery of fuel, ammunition, and replacement equipment.

Soviet forces suffered more casualties than the Germans. These losses included personnel from different military units, not just tank crews. The Soviet Union suffered approximately 450 tank losses, while Germany suffered between 50 and 100 tank losses.

German forces also faced problems transporting supplies during Operation Barbarossa. Many roads in Soviet territory were unpaved, making it difficult for vehicles to travel. The Soviet railway system also used a different track width than Germany, which meant that railway lines needed to be converted. As German forces advanced farther into Soviet territory, they moved farther away from their supply lines. This created difficulties transporting fuel, ammunition, and replacement parts. These supply problems continued as the invasion lasted longer than German commanders had originally expected.

The Battle of Kiev demonstrated the relationship between military equipment, industrial production, and operational conditions. Although Soviet forces had newer tanks, they still suffered more casualties than German forces. German armored forces advanced into Soviet territory while experiencing increasing logistical and equipment difficulties.

=== June and July ===
After the start of Operation Barbarossa on 22 June 1941, Army Group South attacked Ukraine. The Red Army forces in this area put up a strong defense and despite a shortage of fuel and ammunition, they were ordered by the high command to carry out immediate counter-attacks. The 13th and 14th Panzer Divisions overcame this defense, and captured Lutsk on 26 June. Panzer Group 1 was the armored spearhead of Army Group South, and was thought to be in an ideal position to advance towards Kiev via Rivne. Meanwhile, Kirponos was trying to mount a concentrated counterattack. Commencement of his counter-attack on 26 June led to an armored battle of unprecedented scale between more than 2,000 tanks on a 70-kilometer front line. The inexperience of the Red Army officers in controlling the mass of armored forces contributed to the failure of this counter-attack, and resulted in destruction of many Soviet reserves in the region. German forces also sustained heavy casualties however, and Army Group South thus lagged behind the rest of the advancing German forces.

On 30 June, Lvov was captured by the German 17th Army. On the same day, the ineffectiveness of earlier counter-attacks caused Stavka to order Kirponos to withdraw his forces to new defensive positions by 9 July, in the fortified areas of Korosten, Novgorod-Volynski and Letychiv near the 1939 Soviet-Polish border, known as the Stalin Line. Despite the delay in the advance of the German III Motorized Corps from the Kirponos counterattack, by the arrival of the 11th Panzer Division at Berdichev on 7 July, the Stalin line was also broken and a gap was created between the Soviet 5th and 6th Armies south of Novgorod-Volynski.

With Kiev under threat and the risk of the Southwestern Front splitting in half between the Soviet 5th Army in Kiev and 6th Army south of Berdychiv, Stavka ordered a new series of counter-attacks on the same day to destroy the enemy spearhead, stop the advance of the Germans towards Kiev and maintain communication between these two armies. However, before these counterattacks began between 11 and 14 July, the capture of Zhitomir by German forces on 8 July created a weakness in Soviet defenses, and the German III Motorized Corps managed to break through the line and open the road to Kiev on 10 July. On the same day, the 13th Panzer Division of the III Motorized Corps created a defensive gap known as the "Zhitomir Corridor" that reached the Irpen River, just 15 kilometers west of Kiev. Red Army counterattacks again caused such significant damage to the mobile forces of the Soviet Southwestern Front that only 7 BT and 25 T-26 tanks of the 9th Mechanized Corps, 4 KV-1, 7 T-34 and 22 T-26 tanks of the 19th Mechanized Corps and 2 BT and 28 T-26 tanks of the 22nd Mechanized Corps remained out of their initial strength.

Some parts of the German forces lagged 100 km behind, which caused the decision of whether to attack Kiev immediately to be left to the higher levels of the German command. Nikita Khrushchev, the political commissar of the Southwestern Front, was then in charge of the Kiev garrison, which included three rifle divisions, an airborne brigade, a tank regiment, some NKVD motorized forces, students of the 1st Artillery College of Kiev, two anti-tank battalions, and about 29,000 militiamen.

== Debates over the attack on Kiev ==
On 9 July, Army Group South command and the German Army High Command (OKH) re-emphasized the encirclement and destruction of the Soviet forces west of the Dnieper as the main objective of the operation. Seeing as the Soviet South-West Front was close to collapsing, capturing Kiev was considered to be a secondary goal. At this time Hitler did not want to assault Kiev, and prioritised the capture of a bridgehead on the Dnieper, subject to the destruction of large formations of Soviet forces west of the river. However, German Army senior commanders were still interested in capturing Kiev. Repeated attacks by the forces of the Soviet 5th Army from the Pripyat region kept the German 6th Army occupied and unable to be used for this purpose. Rundstedt was confident that Kiev would be captured by the III Motorized Corps in its rapid advance, but Hitler, after consulting with Field Marshal Walter von Brauchitsch, commander in chief of the German army, felt that such a move would "unnecessarily sacrifice" panzer forces. Finally, at 1am on 10 July, Generaloberst Franz Halder, chief of the German army general staff, called the headquarters of the Army Group South and prohibited the use of panzer forces in the direction of Kiev, except for reconnaissance and security purposes. By approving this order, Hitler made the III Motorized Corps responsible only for protection against attacks from the direction of Kiev, and he ordered them to avoid assaulting the city. He further pointed out that if the encirclement of the Soviet forces up to the southern Bug River was not achieved, the whole of the 1st Armored Group would advance towards Kiev and the Dnieper River in the southeast.

Meanwhile, Rundstedt believed that with the retreat of many units of the Red Army to the east, it was no longer practical to encircle them up to the southern Bug River, and together with Halder, he wanted to encircle them around Bila Tserkva, west of the Dnieper River. Hitler expressed his consent to this, provided that the northern flank of Panzer Group 1 would be protected. Brauchitsch took advantage of the ambiguity of this order, and concluded that the capture of Kiev would secure the Panzer Group's northern flank, but left the final decision to the commander of the Army Group South. Meanwhile, Rundstedt and Field Marshal Walter von Reichenau, commander of the German 6th Army, who had previously supported the assault on Kiev, now doubted it. Finally, Generaloberst Ewald von Kleist, commander of Panzer Group 1, was advised that if his offensive in coordination with the 6th Army provided a suitable opportunity to capture this city without the risk of being pushed back, then he was free to do so. Finally, the reconnaissance forces of the Wehrmacht determined on 13 July that the fortifications and concentration of the Soviet forces in Kiev left no chance for a surprise attack.

== Change in German strategy ==
In early July, after the end of the battle of Smolensk, German Army Group Center planned to attack Moscow from three axes, commencing in the beginning of September. The Soviet 5th Army held its previous positions in the Pripyat Marshes until mid-July, and this caused the creation of an additional front line of more than 250 kilometers in the open southern and northern flanks of the German army groups Center and South. In the face of this situation and following the strong resistance of the Soviet forces around Smolensk, German army High Command changed its strategy for the continuation of the operation from mid-July. Hitler's directive No. 33 on 19 July, while criticizing the performance of the northern flank of the Army Group South against the Soviet 5th Army, mandated the German forces to "prevent escape of large amounts of enemy forces by crossing the Dnieper River deep into the Russian territories and destroy them". On this basis, the left wing of the Army Group South, in cooperation with the right wing of the Army Group Center, moved to destroy the Soviet 5th Army. Army Group Center continued its advance towards Moscow only with its infantry. Joint command was not established for the parts of both army groups that were to cooperate in the new operation.

== Initial Soviet strategy ==
On 23 July, Stavka formed the Central Front under the command of General Fyodor Kuznetsov, consisting of the severely weakened 13th and 21st Armies, to protect the Sozh River and Gomel region on the southern flank of the German Army Group Center.

General Georgy Zhukov, the Chief of the General Staff of the Red Army, upon receiving information from the front line, concluded that the movement of the Army Group Center to the east had stopped and that the biggest strategic threat to the Soviet forces was to the Central Front, where the movement of German mechanized forces to the south could cause the Soviet Southwestern Front to become in danger of being encircled. Zhukov told Stalin on 29 July that the success of any German advance toward Leningrad and Moscow seemed unlikely, but that the Gomel region was the Red Army's key strategic weakness. Therefore, Zhukov recommended that three armies, including one army from the strategic reserve and two armies from the Western and Southwestern Fronts, and larger amounts of artillery, be assigned to the Central Front. He also recommended that Lieutenant General Nikolai Vatutin be appointed as its commander. Stalin stated that the transfer of those forces would weaken the defenses of Moscow. In response, Zhukov stated that it was possible to transfer nine fully equipped divisions from the Far East within two weeks to strengthen these defenses, but Stalin expressed concern that the Far East would then be vulnerable to Japanese attack. Zhukov suggested that the Soviet Southwestern Front be pulled back behind the Dnieper River. When Stalin asked about the fate of Kiev in this case, Zhukov stated that it could be abandoned. Stalin became upset and rebuked Zhukov in a harsh tone and called his words "worthless". He stated his intention was to preserve Kiev at all costs, like Leningrad. Zhukov told Stalin that if he thought the Chief of the General Staff was talking "nonsense", he should be dismissed and sent to the front line. Stalin agreed to this request and appointed Marshal Boris Shaposhnikov to replace Zhukov as the chief of the Red Army General Staff, and for Zhukov to command the Soviet reserve front.

== Continuation of Army Group South's advance ==
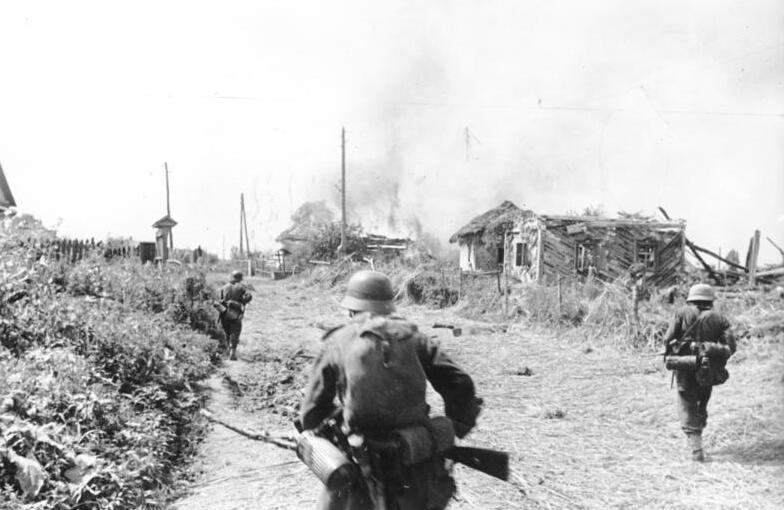
Men from a German forward detachment attack the village of Hatne west of Kiev, August 1941

Despite the stubborn resistance of the Red Army forces and unexpectedly heavy rain, the German 17th Army managed to break through in the Vinnytsia region, and the 11th Army advanced to the Dniester River. Panzer Group 1 was able to reach the Dnieper River and create a bridgehead on it south of Kiev. On 28 July, Stavka ordered the Southwestern and Southern Fronts to disrupt the German offensive, and prevent more of them from reaching the Dnieper River. In response, the Southwestern Front had to re-organize its forces and prepare to attack towards Radomyshl and Zhitomir to connect with the Southern Front. However, Germans completed their encirclement of Soviet forces in Uman region on 4 August, trapping the Soviet 6th and 12th Armies in it. Stavka reorganised troops; the Soviet 5th Army received the 1st Airborne Corps, the 15th and 31st Rifle Corps, and the 9th and 22nd Mechanized Corps, and was ordered to attack the same day. The 5th Army's counterattack was stopped on 8 August with little gain and heavy casualties. On the same day, Korosten, 150 kilometers northwest of Kiev, was captured by the German XVII Army Corps, forcing the Soviet 5th Army to retreat towards Kiev.

On 4 August, Stavka placed the 38th Soviet Army and the 8th Mechanized Corps under the command of Lieutenant General Dmitry Ryabyshev, and ordered all available units in the Cherkasy region to cover the gap created as a result of the loss of the Uman region armies. This army had a total strength of 40,000 men in five rifle and four cavalry divisions, which had mostly recently arrived in the region, and were tasked to defend a 200 km front line. Stavka also formed the Soviet 37th Army under Major General Andrey Vlasov six days later, after the Soviet 6th and 12th Armies were officially disbanded, and stationed it on the line of the Dnieper River between Kiev and Kremenchuk.

The most advanced elements of the German 6th Army reached the outskirts of Kiev on 6 August, but were stopped by the Soviet 37th Army. Two days later, the 6th Army was forced to take a defensive position and was pushed back from some positions by the 37th Army's counterattack from 12 August. On the same day, Hitler ordered Rundstedt to stop the assault on Kiev.

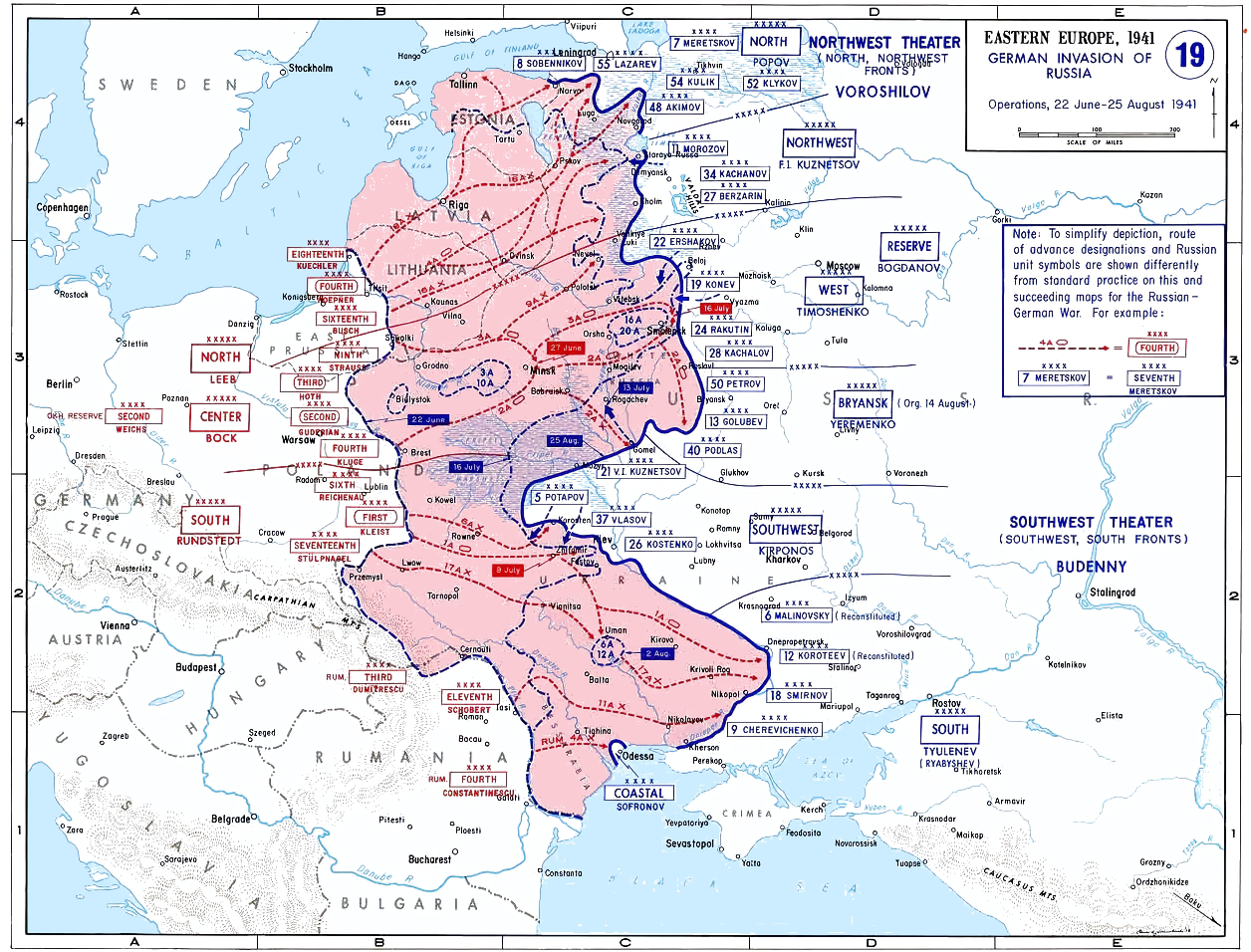
Operation Barbarossa, 22 June to 25 August 1941

Rundstedt issued his Order No. 5 on 10 August, ordering his forces to capture the west bank of the Dnieper River. As part of this operation, Nikolaev was captured by Germans on 16 August, and the SS division Leibstandarte SS Adolf Hitler reached Kherson on 19 August. Meanwhile, the German 22nd Infantry Division of the III Army Corps captured a 650-metre bridge over the Dnieper in Berislav for the 11th Army, the 9th Panzer Division secured a crossing over the Dnieper in Zaporozhye, and the 13th Panzer Division captured a 900-meter bridge in Dnipropetrovsk on 25 August. On the next day, the German 60th Motorized Infantry Division reinforced this bridgehead, and was joined within a week by the 198th Infantry Division and SS Viking Division. The heavy counterattacks of the Red Army on this position targeted the Germans from three sides, but the Wehrmacht forces, with the support of the Luftwaffe aircraft, including the 22nd Italian fighter group, repelled them. Rundstedt tried to create another bridgehead in Cherkasy to reduce the pressure on the bridgeheads. When this succeeded, Marshal Semyon Budyonny, commander of the Soviet Southwestern Front, counter-attacked against Cherkasy.

== Army Group Center's advance to the south ==
According to the 29 July report, out of the initial 953 tanks of the Army Group Center's Panzer Group 2 at the beginning of the operation, only 263 tanks remained serviceable as of 25 July. This unit also lost about 20,000 men out of its initial strength of 113,000 troops up to this time, while receiving only 10,000 soldiers as replacements. Therefore, Generaloberst Heinz Guderian, commander of the Panzer Group 2 in the right (southern) flank of the Army Group Center, informed the Army Group commander that his units would not be ready to undertake any new operations before 5 August. Facing a high number of enemy forces and logistical problems, on 30 July, Hitler issued directive No. 34, ordering Army Group Center to pull its two panzer groups out of the front line to rebuild and refit to transfer them to the flanks, while also taking a defensive posture in the best positions along with limited offensive operations. The purpose was to focus the German advance on Leningrad in the north and Kiev and Ukraine in the south. The movement of Army Group Center to the south created the possibility that, considering the battlefield conditions and the bulge on the front line, a very large encirclement would be created if the Red Army forces did not evacuate the bulge in time.

The German Army High Command's emphasis on Moscow initially limited the number of units that were initially assigned to Panzer Group 2 for the new operation to preserve the necessary resources for the future advance to the east. By Halder's order, despite Guderian's opposition and protest, only units of the Panzer Group 2 were to be used, which "are not needed in other missions of the Army Group Center and have enough readiness and mobility for combat". To counter the Soviet 5th Army, Halder ordered the capture of the parts of Gomel and Chernigov that could be reached.

By the beginning of the execution of Hitler's directive No. 34 on 6 August by the Central Army Group, the German Second Army and the XXIV Motorized Corps of the Panzer Group 2 attacked in the direction of Gomel in the south by crossing the Suzh River. Guderian's forces, along with air support of the 3rd and 53rd bomber, 210th heavy fighter and 51st fighters wings, pushed back the 21st Army of the Soviet Central Front to the south, threatening Red Army front line by creating a gap between its Southern Front around Kiev and the units of the Western and Reserve Fronts east of Smolensk. On 14 August, Stavka tried to block the Germans advance by filling the gap between the Western and Reserve Fronts and the weak Soviet Central Front by forming the Bryansk Front, under the command of Lieutenant General Andrey Yeryomenko, with the 3rd and 13th Armies and the newly formed 50th Army. This front, with a total of 15 rifle divisions, three cavalry divisions, one tank division and one airborne corps, was tasked with covering a front line of 230 kilometers from south of Roslavl in the north to Novgorod-Seversky in the south.

Colonel General Fyodor Kuznetsov, the commander of the Central Front, decided to abandon Gomel on 15 August. The Soviet rearguard left behind to protect the retreat of the rest of the Central Front forces defended Gomel against the Germans. On 16 August, Bock ordered the German Second Army to leave only the necessary forces in the Zhlobin area and with the rest of its forces to attack Gomel in the south. However, the resistance and attacks of the Red Army in the Gomel region on the same day stopped the advance of the XLIII and XIII Army Corps of the German 2nd Army to the south. To prevent the escape of Soviet forces from the Gomel area, Guderian ordered the XXIV Motorized Corps to Starodub, 120 km east of Gomel. The road junction in Meglin, 60 kilometers north of Starodub, was captured by the 3rd Panzer Division of this corps on 16 August. The next day, despite enduring heavy pressure from the west, the German 10th Motorized Infantry and 3rd Panzer Divisions captured and destroyed a section of the Gomel-Bryansk railway.

Guderian's panzer forces and the infantry of the Second Army occupied Pochep, 60 km northeast of Starodub, and reached the outskirts of Gomel and Starodub by 18 August to sever the connection between the Soviet 13th and 21st Armies and to cause a break between the Soviet Central and Reserve Fronts. On the same day, Stavka formed the 40th Army, under the command of Major General Kuzma Podlas, as part of the Southwestern Front, specifically to block Guderian's advance. The force was weak, however, and consisted only of two rifle divisions and an airborne corps, which had been severely weakened by previous battles in the Dnieper River area. On 19 August, some units of the 3rd Panzer Division were surrounded by Red Army forces near Oncha, 30 kilometers north of Starodub. As the situation became serious, some forward forces of the 3rd Panzer Division returned to Oncha, disengaging from Starodub. Despite the settlement of the situation in Oncha, the infantry of the German 2nd Army was still far away from that place because of the clashes in the Zhlobin area, and the Red Army still blocked the Meglin-Oncha road.

The Wehrmacht's supply lines were unable to keep up with the advance of its panzer forces on the bad roads of the region. The poor mechanical condition of the panzer divisions and the proneness of their tanks to break down further hampered Guderian's advance. Thus, during this period, despite the order of the German Army High Command to the XXIV Motorized Corps to advance towards Gomel from the east, this unit was unable to do so. The lack of coordination between the German divisions created a difficult situation in the Gomel region. The diaries of the logistics officer of 3rd Panzer Division on 18 August stated: "The advance of the division is so rapid that the [supply] columns are unable to keep themselves coordinated." The supply columns of the XXIV Motorized Corps were moving at an average speed of only 12 kilometres per hour during that advance. The next day, the lack of fuel forced General der Panzertruppen Leo Geyr von Schweppenburg, the commander of the XXIV Motorized Corps, to inform Guderian's headquarters that the capture of Novozybkov, 70 kilometers east of Gomel, was not feasible. Guderian, in turn, reported this issue to Bock. In addition to the fuel issue, the lack of spare parts brought the number of operational tanks of the 4th Panzer Division to only 44 and on 22 August in 3rd Panzer Division to only 60 tanks. Finally, on 21 August, the XXIV Motorized Corps was resupplied with fuel by air, and Starodub was captured on 22 August.

The final German attack on Gomel began on 19 August, with XIII Army Corps attacking it from the northwest and northeast. The 17th Infantry Division penetrated into the city from the west and north, leading to intense house-to-house clashes. By evening, the Red Army troops were pushed to the southern part of the city, where they attempted to destroy all the bridges over the Sozh River in the city. The fighting continued for another day in Gomel. Despite the strong resistance of the Soviet 21st Army, Panzer Group 2 and the 2nd Army completely captured Gomel by 21 August. The clearing of the city of remaining Red Army elements was done by the German 131st Infantry Division. A third of the Soviet defenders of Gomel were encircled and defeated. About 50,000 soldiers were captured by the Germans in this position. After the capture of Gomel, the Soviet 5th Army, enduring heavy pressure in its northern flank from the German 2nd Army, began to retreat eastward from the area north of Mozyr, southwest of the Pripyat Marshes.

== Guderian's entry into Ukraine ==
On 21 August, Hitler ordered the German 2nd Army and Panzer Group 2 to advance to the south, deeper into Ukraine. However, on 23 August, the German Army High Command, in planning to pursue a simultaneous offensive towards the south and Moscow, split the Panzer Group 2 and ordered XLVIII Motorized Corps to remain in the Smolensk region as a mobile reserve. On the same day, Guderian, without knowing about the order, in his meeting with Hitler in Wolfschanze, was promised that his panzer group would remain united reaffirmed. The next day, Guderian learned about the order from High Command and immediately requested the return of the corps, which was scheduled to join the 4th Army. However, he was turned down by Bock. Panzer Group 2 resumed its advance to the south on 25 August, attacking the Soviet central front through Gomel and Starodub, driving it back in disarray towards the Desna River.

The Desna River was considered a major natural obstacle in front of Guderian's forces on their way to Ukraine. On 25 August, the 3rd Panzer Division reached Novgorod-Seversky on the bank of the river. Panzer Group 2 initially received reports about the destruction of a vital bridge across the Desna. However, it was revealed that the 800-meter bridge had been captured intact by the 3rd Panzer Division on the morning of 26 August. Guderian called this news "surprising and the most pleasant". After this success, the 3rd Panzer Division expanded its front eight kilometers beyond the river to protect the bridgehead. The next day, Soviet forces attempted to take back the eastern bank of the river and destroy the bridge. The German front was pushed back, but the Germans eventually repulsed the attacks. The German 10th Motorized Infantry Division also captured another crossing on the Desna River near Korop, 50 km southwest of Novgorod-Seversky. On 30 August, this division tried to continue advancing south alone, but directly contacted Yeryomenko's offensive front line and was repulsed. According to diaries of Bock and Guderian, this division was unable to protect its bridgehead south of the Desna river against the attack of four enemy divisions. This assault weakened the 3rd Panzer Division and the 10th Motorized Infantry Division of the XXIV Motorized Corps to such an extent that these divisions took a defensive position for a while.

== German Army Group South crosses the Dnieper ==
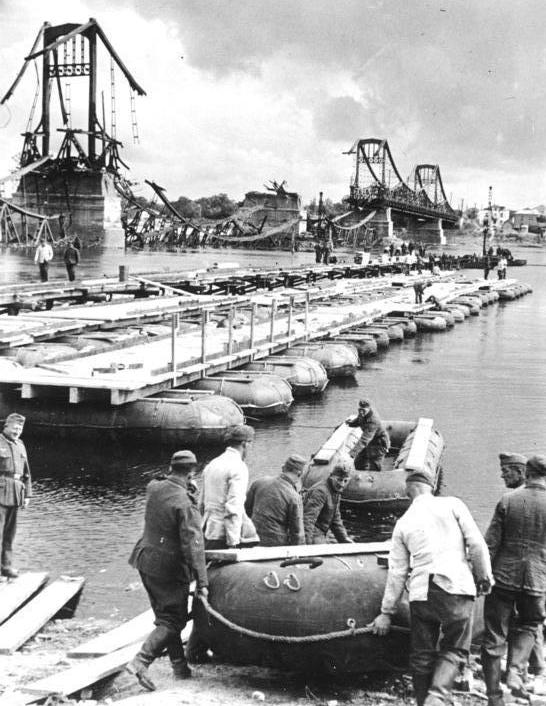
German troops constructing a pontoon bridge across the Dnieper in the vicinity of Kiev, 1941

By the end of August, the Soviet Southwestern Front, consisting of more than 50 divisions in 6 armies, was in a triangular formation with its apex west of Kiev at a depth of 500 km. The long flanks of this front were attacked from the north by the German Panzer Armored Group 2 and the 2nd Army, from the west by the German 6th Army, and from the south by the German Panzer Group 1 and the 17th Army. Even before the start of the new German operation, the Soviet Southwestern front was in a precarious position and already semi-encircled. The most powerful formations of Kirponos, being deployed in the western areas, were not facing the danger of the German Panzer forces on the outer flanks. Kirponos was aware of these conditions, but the approach of the Soviet High Command did not allow him to take effective action.

After Budyonny and Kirponos's repeated requests to Stavka to withdraw the Soviet 5th Army to shorter lines, and the Soviet High Command's agreement to that on 19 August, German forces crossed the Dnieper to the east on 23 August. The command of the German 6th Army did not expect the withdrawal of the Soviet 5th Army until 18 August. Halder and the command of the Army Group South ordered to quickly pursue these Soviet forces. Bad roads in the area delayed the German 6th Army. The Soviet 5th Army was not able to destroy the wooden bridge over the Dnieper behind itself, and the bridge was assaulted by LI Army Corps of the German 6th Army and 11th Panzer Division forces, leading to its capture. Kirponos ordered all air assets at his disposal to destroy the bridge, and Soviet Il-2 aircraft destroyed the bridge with incendiary bombs, cutting off the German troops who had crossed the Dnieper River from behind. These forces were isolated from other German units in the marshes between the Dnieper and Desna for ten days until the German engineers repaired the bridge by 2 September.

On 26 August, the XVII Army Corps of the German 6th Army in the northern flank of the Army Group South captured Chernobyl, 110 km north of Kiev. On 1 September, Generalleutnant Georg von Sudenstern, the Chief of Staff of Army Group South, communicated with the Army Group Center's 2nd Army to coordinate his left wing. He stated that the lack of equipment that was required to cross the river made the 6th Army of the Army Group South dependent on help from the German 2nd Army to do so.

A lack of supplies made the motorized corps of Panzer Group 1 rest and rebuild for several days from 27 to 28 August. Meanwhile, the XXIV Motorized Corps, as Guderian's armored spearhead in the northern part of the Wehrmacht operation in the Kiev region, began a new operation on 25 August. However, the difficult geographical conditions east of the Dnieper River and north of Kiev caused Rundstedt to worry about the escape of the Soviet forces to the east. The strong resistance of the Soviet 5th Army and the logistical problems of the German 2nd and 6th Armies intensified this concern. On 28 and 29 August, he ordered Panzer Group 1 and the 6th and 17th armies to cross the Dnieper River in as many places as possible. On 1 September, Panzer Group 1 received an order to end their period of rebuilding and return to the front line. This meant that the command of Army Group South decided to use its worn-out forces with "the last of their remaining strength" and without rest.

The LII Army Corps of the German 17th Army seized a crossing on the Dnieper in Derievka, south of Kremenchuk, 280 kilometers southeast of Kiev, on 31 August. The Panzer forces of Army Group South expanded this bridgehead by reinforcing it on 4 September. Facing this danger, Marshal Budyonny immediately ordered the Soviet 38th Army under the command of Major General Feklenko to destroy the German forces that had crossed the river. However, this army was too weak to do so, and its planned counterattack for 8 September was not executed.

The intensification of the Soviet resistance, and the knowledge that the Red Army was redistributing its best troops, caused the Germans to change their assessment of the situation after the end of August, and made it clear that Stalin had ordered Soviet forces to preserve the Dnieper river line. Initially, Rundstedt planned to send the 17th Army towards Guderian to the north through the Kremenchuk bridgehead, so the 1st Panzer Group would attack through the Dnipropetrovsk bridgehead to the east. Accordingly, on 4 September, Army Group South ordered the 17th Army to attack the Mirgorod-Lubny general line to encircle the enemy forces in the Middle Dnieper region and Kiev. Panzer Group 1 was to cover the right flank of this movement by advancing towards Poltava via Krasnograd in a northerly direction. After a meeting on 8 September at the headquarters of Army Group South in presence of Brauchitsch and Halder, it was decided to reverse the roles of the 17th Army and the Panzer Group 1. The purpose of this change was to complete the encirclement of the enemy as quickly as possible.

In addition, it was decided that the Panzer Group 1 would advance to Romny, 200 km to the north, and hold a 100 km line from Lubny in the south to block the path of possible strong enemy attacks from this area to open an escape route. Four infantry divisions of the 17th Army were also ordered to hold the rest of the encirclement ring from Lubny to the south, while its other six infantry divisions were to move towards Kharkov in the east. The start date of the new operation was set on 11 September. Before Halder left the meeting, Rundstedt had asked him to put Panzer Group 2 and the 2nd Army under his command to create unity in the command of operations in the Kiev area, which was rejected.

The V Air Corps Luftwaffe was deployed to new bases in Kirovograd and Uman to provide air support to Army Group South. The LII, LV and parts of the XI Army Corps of the German 17th Army crossed the Dnieper in the center of the front line of the Southern Army Group on 10 September. Panzer Group 1, led by the forces of Major-General Hans-Valentin Hube in the 16th Panzer Division of XLVIII Motorized Corps, began crossing the Dnieper on 11 September. By 12 September, Army Group South concentrated 20 divisions in this area against 5 rifle and 4 cavalry divisions of the 38th Army in the southern flank of the Soviet southwestern front. Rain, muddy roads, logistical problems and local counter-attacks of the Red Army delayed the advance of the Army Group South to some extent. 16th Panzer Division was used as the armored spearhead of the XLVIII Motorized Corps and initially achieved success, but after running out of fuel, stopped to resupply. At this time, Panzer Group 1 had a total of 331 tanks, which was equivalent to 53% of its initial strength on 22 June. After collecting the necessary supplies and building a suitable bridge, XLVIII Motorized Corps, under the command of Lieutenant General Werner Kempf, resumed the attack.

== Soviet counter-attacks on the Bryansk front ==
Beyond the losses inflicted to the Red Army as a result of the Army Group Center actions in the northern (Velikiye Luki area) and southern (Roslavl, Krychev, Zhlobin, and then Gomel) flanks, Soviet command believed these attacks were merely tactical measures to divert attention or resources from the vital Smolensk-Moscow axis. Until this time, the Soviet senior commanders thought that the objective of Guderian's movement to the south was to attack towards Bryansk and then Moscow. Therefore, the Bryansk Front was generally responsible for defending the Moscow axis from the southwest and was not responsible for preventing the penetration of the Panzer Group 2 in the northern flank of the Soviet Southwestern Front. Moreover, by keeping troops in the Kiev area, the Soviet High Command hoped to use them against the southern flank of Army Group Center as it advanced towards Moscow.

Contrary to the expectations of the Red Army, Guderian continued to attack to the south with little resistance, taking the Soviets by surprise. However, Stalin still insisted that Kirponos should continue to defend Kiev at any cost and believed that the Bryansk front, in addition to protecting the Bryansk axis, was also capable of defeating the enemy forces that were threatening the northern and southwestern fronts, and destroying them as well. Stalin refused to order an all-out attack by the Bryansk front against Guderian's eastern flank to preserve the forces of the front to stop the future advance of Army Group Center towards Moscow.

The Western Front was under the command of General Semyon Timoshenko, the Reserve Front under the command of General Zhukov, and the Bryansk Front under the command of General Yeryomenko. On 25 August, Stavka ordered them to carry out concentrated counter-attacks in the Smolensk-Yelnia-Novozybkov axis to repel Guderian's invasion, and in the process to confront the entirety of Army Group Center. Accordingly, after the dissolution of the Soviet Central Front and addition of the Soviet 21st Army under its command, the Bryansk Front was ordered to defeat the Panzer Group 2 by conducting a direct attack and to bolster the strong defense of the north of Kiev. This operation was to take place on a very wide front line from Zhukovka in the north to Yampol in the south. On 26 August, Stavka asked the Bryansk front to encircle and destroy Guderian's forces in Starodub, and bring the flanks of the Soviet 13th and 21st armies closer to each other. This order was issued while the assembly of the Bryansk Front was not yet completed, and its implementation would cause the use of the Red Army forces piecemeal. There was also a large gap between the main part of the Bryansk Front and the reinforcements from the former Central Front, and only the Soviet 50th Army was fresh and capable of sustained offensive operations. Stavka insisted on continuing these counterattacks despite these problems. False information led the Red Army to believe that the Germans were planning to inflict a heavy blow on the right (north) flank of the Bryansk front. Therefore, Shaposhnikov ordered Yeryomenko to reinforce this part with the 50th Army. That action caused the army to move from the threatened area to an area where there was no danger, and the counterattack of the Bryansk front was greatly weakened at a vital point.

After the failure of the first counterattack of the Bryansk Front, on 28 August, Stavka ordered a massive air attack by 450 aircraft of the Bryansk Front with at least 100 DB-3 bombers against the German tanks. Between 29 August and 4 September, Soviet aircraft made more than 4,000 sorties against Panzer Group 2. Despite Yeryomenko's post-war claims that this massive air offensive was "very effective", these Soviet air attacks had little effect on Guderian's advance. During these attacks, 55 Soviet aircraft were shot down, and 57 other aircraft were destroyed by German attacks on eight Soviet air bases. Following this inconclusive air operation, two days later Stavka again ordered the whole Bryansk Front to launch another counterattack towards Roslavl and Starodub, and destroy Guderian's forces at Pochep, Novgorod-Seversky and Novozybkov, and subsequently further advance to reach the Petrovichi-Klimovichi-Shchors line by 15 September. Yeryomenko ordered the counteroffensive to begin on 2 September. The two shock groups of the Bryansk front operated in two axes with a distance of 140 kilometers between them.

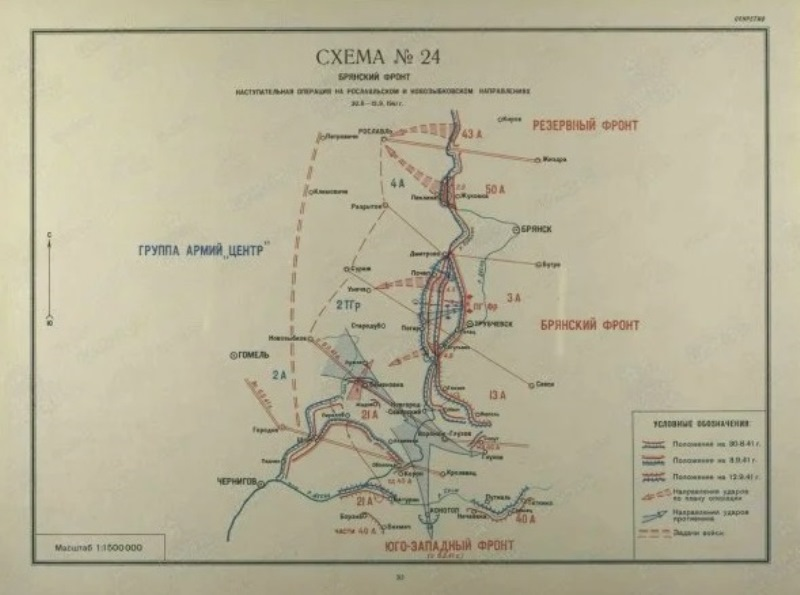
Soviet Bryansk Front counterattack against the eastern flank of the Panzer Group, known as the Roslavl-Novozybkov Offensive operation, did not gain much.

Elsewhere, the Soviet 108th Tank Division attacked on 30 August with more than 90 tanks, including a large number of KV-1 heavy tanks on which the usual German anti-tank weapons did not work, against the 17th Panzer Division of XLVII Motorized Corps on Guderian's eastern flank. This attack created a 2-kilometer breach in the German lines and raised the concern of splitting this German corps in half. The 17th Panzer Division's counterattack next day was ineffective because of the superiority of the Red Army tanks, and resulted in the loss of 11 German tanks. On 1 September, the counterattack of the 18th Panzer Division, another division of XLVII Motorized Corps, also collided with the Soviet 4th Cavalry Division, which was in the area in support of its tank division. Finally, with the fire concentration from two Panzer divisions and the air support of the II Air Corps of the Luftwaffe, the attack of Yeryomenko's tanks was repelled after causing great damage to both sides.

The confusing operational conditions made the reorganization of the Bryansk front face many supply problems. which were not resolved until the beginning of the operation. Therefore, Yeryomenko asked for the postponement of the counterattack until 3 September, which was agreed to by Soviet command. However, under pressure from Stavka, Yeryomenko was again forced to launch the counterattack on 2 September. After two hours of artillery shelling, both shock groups directly attacked Guderian's advance forces. Inadequate air support, uncoordinated attacks and other factors caused this counterattack of the Bryansk front to fail, with the XLVII Motorized Corps repelling these counterattacks. During those clashes, the armored forces of the Soviet Bryansk Front were destroyed, and Guderian's tanks continued to move south.

== Discussion about continuation of the Wehrmacht operation ==
On 26 August, Guderian asked again the German Army High Command to release the XLVI Motorized Corps, but was once again rejected. On 27 August, during a visit of Major General Friedrich Paulus, Quartermeister of OKH, to the headquarters of the Panzer Group 2, Guderian again requested to receive more reinforcements. Guderian stated that the German 2nd Army, advancing towards the southwest, was in an operationally diverging course from Panzer Group 2, and was now separated from the right wing of the XXIV Motorized Corps, which created a 75 km gap between them. He considered the left (eastern) wing of the XXIV Motorized Corps to be similarly insecure. Guderian proposed a solution; transferring the XIII and XLIII Corps as well as the 1st Cavalry Division from the 2nd Army to his command. Guderian also repeated his request for the return of the XLVI motorized corps, and Paulus agreed to support these requests. On the same day, Guderian contacted General-Major Hans von Greifenberg, the Chief of Staff of Army Group Center, and made a similar request for reinforcements. Considering the pressure exerted on the long defensive line of the Army Group Center and its need to have a mobile reserve, Bock, in consultation with Halder, initially agreed only to move the 1st Cavalry Division closer to the right flank of the XXIV Motorized Corps. When Guderian insisted on his demands again on 29 August, Bock rejected Guderian's request, stating that the XXIV Motorized Corps had informed the 2nd Army that it did not consider there to be a threat on its right flank. However, Bock agreed for the Grossdeutschland infantry regiment to be transferred to Guderian on the next day.

On 30 August, the Operations department of the German Army General staff ordered Army Group Center to prepare to place the divisions of the 2nd Army under the command of Panzer Group 2 after the 2nd Army crossed the Desna river, "in order to continue operations with the Army Group South". The headquarters and "parts of the 2nd Army that are not needed in the continuation of operations south of the Desna River" remained at the disposal of the Army Group Center. The number of these "required divisions" depended on the demands of Army Group South, placing them at the forefront of decision-making.

In the meantime, the issue of continuing the advance to the east towards Moscow was intensively discussed by German high command. A plan was formed that Panzer Group 2 and the 2nd Army would stop at the Nezhin-Konotop railway, before completing the encirclement of the Soviet Southwestern Front, and then rush eastward with the rest of Army Group Center. In this regard, after being informed about the Army General staff directive, Hitler informed Brauchitsch on 30 August that the strength of the Army Group Center around Desna River should not be used for operations in Ukraine, but must be prepared to be used to advance towards Moscow. Bock, who had initially wanted to continue advance towards Moscow, now saw operational opportunities in the south, and so was opposed to this plan. He considered Guderian's movement as irreversible, and strongly desired to complete the offensive to the south, to avoid a time-consuming and costly redeployment of forces. Hitler decided to allow Guderian to continue south and connect to Panzer Group 1.

== Continuation of Guderian's advance ==
At this time, while the XLVII Motorized Corps was solely responsible for protecting the long left (eastern) flank of the Panzer Group 2, only 86 operational tanks were left for XXIV Motorized Corps as Guderian's armored spearhead. That was equivalent to fewer than half of the tanks of the 3rd Panzer Division at the beginning of the Barbarossa operation. Only the 4th Panzer division of this corps was capable of offensive operations at the time. Therefore, that same evening, Bock reluctantly agreed to send the SS Panzer Division Das Reich to Guderian. According to Bock, in a report on 2 September, Guderian described the situation of the Panzer Group 2 so pessimistic that the commander of the army group proposed to get permission for the tactical withdrawal of Guderian's forces from OKH, so that these forces could support the German 2nd army on their left flank. Guderian immediately rejected this proposal and used the opportunity to insist on his previous request for reinforcements. Finally, under the influence of Guderian's report, Bock agreed to release the XLVI Motorized Corps on 2 September.

After four days of halting their armored spearhead at the Desna river crossing and receiving sufficient supplies, the advance of the Panzer Group 2 to the south was resumed on 31 August. Guderian's offensive pushed aside the Bryansk front and put the Soviet 180th tank division in a semi-encirclement situation at the end of 2 September, while also dealing a heavy blow to its 4th cavalry division. Until 6 September, the mobile forces of the Bryansk front were surrounded and fighting for their survival. Guderian's forces had captured around 30,000 Soviet forces prior to the tenth day of their advance in Ukraine.

Following this, Stalin severely criticized Yeryomenko, and ordered him to pull his troops out of the encirclement if possible, and to use any available air forces even in bad weather. At this time, only 16 tanks and 5 armored vehicles were available for the Soviet 108th tank division, and only 38 tanks were left in the 141st tank brigade. Yeryomenko tried desperate measures to free his troops, including the use of roadblocking units that opened fire on his own forces that were retreating without permission, but was unsuccessful.

In a report to Stalin on 4 September, Budyonny described the threat to his flanks and requested immediate reinforcements. In the absence of this possibility, Budyonny requested permission to create a reserve force for himself by transferring four divisions from the 37th and 26th armies of the Western Front. At Stalin's behest, Shaposhnikov rejected both of Budyonny's requests. On 6 September, when the Soviet 21st Army was placed under the command of the Southwest Front, Kirponos ordered this army to attack the rear of the 3rd and 4th Panzer Divisions of the XXIV Motorized Corps from the west. The actions of Kirponos did not affect the movement of Guderian's armored forces and they crossed the Seym River the next day. Faced with a dangerous situation, on 7 September, Kirponos asked for permission to withdraw his forces north of Kiev to the eastern side of the Desna River. After the fall of Chernigov (Note: Before the nighttime retreat, the Red Army set fire to Chernigov in accordance to Soviet scorched earth policy.) on 8 September to the German 2nd Army, Shaposhnikov informed the Southwestern Front on 9 September that the High Command had decided to withdraw the Fifth Army and the right wing of the Soviet 37th Army to the east of the Desna River to take a distance from the German Sixth Army and to rotate its front line to the north, facing the advance of the Panzer Group 2.

== Sacrifice of the Soviet Southwestern Front ==
The Soviet Southwestern Front was defending a front line of more than 800 kilometers. On 11 September, Budyonny sent a telegram to Stalin stating that only powerful forces would be able to prevent the encirclement of this front, which the southwestern front currently lacked. He stated that if the Soviet high command did not provide the necessary reserve forces in this area, it would be necessary to pull back the southwestern front and that any delay in that matter would cause only the loss of its forces and the destruction of a large number of supply units. Budyonny also requested permission to withdraw 250 kilometers eastward from the Dnieper River to the Psyol River. However, Stalin again ordered Kirponos not to abandon Kiev without Stavka's permission and not to destroy the bridges. Stalin believed that if the Southwestern Front retreated from the Dnieper River line, the Germans would quickly gain a foothold on its eastern bank. As a result, the southwest front would be under enemy pressure from three directions instead of two when retreating. In addition, if the Germans moved in a coordinated fashion, the Soviets would be surrounded, as it would not be possible to withdraw all 667,000 troops behind the Psyol River. He considered the encirclement of the 6th and 12th Soviet armies in Uman as the consequence of attempting such a retreat, and that it should not be repeated. Stalin also did not consider the defenses on the Psyol River ready to use.

On 13 September, at the suggestion of Zhukov and by order of Stalin, Stavka replaced Budyonny with Marshal Semyon Timoshenko in command of the Soviet Southwestern direction without issuing a withdrawal authorization. Timoshenko, believing that reinforcements were on the way and the Bryansk Front's counteroffensive would have good results, agreed for the Southwestern Front not to retreat. However, only one rifle division and two tank brigades with 100 tanks were provided to him, and it became clear that the Bryansk front lacked vital strength, with only 20 operational tanks in all its tank brigades.

== Completion of the encirclement ==
On 12 September, by transferring tank units from the 55th Army to the 13th Army, Stavka changed the attack plan of the Bryansk Front, and ordered Yeryomenko to stop his offensive along the Roslavl axis. Reorganizing his forces, he ordered for Guderian's left wing to be targeted again to cover the created gap by the 18 September offensive, and to connect with the units of the southwestern front. To encourage Yeryomenko, Stavka promoted him to the rank of Colonel General and assigned some reinforcements to the disorganized Bryansk Front. After being delayed by rain, the 16th Panzer Division of Army Group Center moved 20 kilometers from the Dnieper River bridgehead to the north, defeating the Soviet 297th Rifle Division. They reached Khorol, 230 kilometers southeast of Kiev, by evening. The division captured the headquarters of the Soviet 38th Army, but Feklenko, the commander of this army, managed to escape. The next day, 14th Panzer Division of Army Group Center reached Lubny, 30 kilometers north of Khorol. By attacking the supply lines of the Soviet Southwest Front, this division captured 1,500 soldiers, 600 trucks, 70 cannons, and 3 aircraft. The 9th Panzer Division was close behind the 16th and 14th divisions. The attacks by Kleist's forces in the Panzer Group 1 created a gap of 20 kilometres between the Soviet 38th and 6th Armies and placed them only 40 kilometres away from Generalmajor Walther Model's forces in the 3rd Panzer Division of the Army Group Center in the north. Meanwhile, the resistance of the Red Army forces was increasing and a fierce air battle was underway. The 16th Panzer Division met the stubborn resistance of the NKVD elements in Lubny, and the advance of 3rd Panzer Division from Romny lasted two days. Those problems caused the German Army High Command plan to connect two Panzer groups to one another on 13 September not to be realized.

A small battle group from the 3rd Panzer Division, consisting of three tanks, eight armored reconnaissance vehicles, six artillery pieces, and an anti-tank company, advanced southward and captured the city of Lokhvytsia and its bridge over the Sula River. The lack of strength in that location made Guderian request that infantry take place of the 18th Panzer Division, which was currently was holding a 90-kilometer line in the northern part of his eastern flank, so that the Panzer division could move towards Romny. The command of the army group opposed that request because of the distance of this division from the intended target. and it also wanted to suffer minimum attrition before the upcoming attack against Moscow.

In the early morning of 14 September, Major General Vasily Tupikov, the Chief of Staff of the Soviet Southwestern Front, sent a personal telegram to Shaposhnikov that stated: "The disaster has begun and will show itself to you in a few days". In a sharp response, Shaposhnikov described Tupikov as "panicky" and called for "calmness and not to yield to panic" at all levels of command and to stop the retreat of the Soviet 21st and 5th Armies. He asked the forces of the Soviet Southwestern Front "not look backwards" and to "fulfil comrade Stalin's order of September ll". On 15 September, under pressure, Timoshenko completely reversed his previous opinion and told Shaposhnikov in Moscow that he wanted the immediate withdrawal of the Soviet Southwestern Front. Meanwhile, with the pressure of the German 6th and 2nd armies, the northern wing of the Soviet southwestern front was gradually collapsing. The German 17th army also slowly began to advance from the Kremenchuk bridgehead to the north. The XI Army Corps of the German 17th Army with three infantry divisions was placed under the command of the Panzer Group 1 on 13 September, to ensure the protection of the eastern flank of the encirclement that was being completed.

At 18:00 on 14 September, a small battle group of the 18th Panzer Division reached an engineer company of the 16th Panzer Division north of Lubny. However, this meeting between the first vanguard elements of the northern and southern pincers was symbolic, and there was still a relatively large space between the body of the two pincers. The next day, more units of the 9th Panzer Division continued moving north to establish a stronger connection. On 16 September, with the complete connection of the 3rd and 16th Panzer Divisions, the armored spearheads of the Panzer Groups 1 and 2, south of Lokhvytsia, the encirclement ring was completed 120 kilometers southeast of Kiev, such that all the Soviet Southwestern Front, including the five Armies, 5th, 21st, 26th, 37th and 38th, were trapped inside it. The encirclement ring was formed on the eastern side by Panzer groups 1 and 2, and on the western side by the German 2nd and 6th armies. The encirclement included a large region with an area of approximately 20,000 square kilometers, 200 kilometers from the connection point of the Wehrmacht's Panzer forces to the city of Kiev, east to west.

== Attempted Soviet retreat ==
On 16 September in Poltava, in a meeting with General Bagramian, the chief of operations of the Southwestern Front, Timoshenko stated that while the encirclement ring of the Germans was not yet tight, a decision should be made without delay to allow the Southwestern Front to retreat. Timoshenko stated that the High Command would eventually make this decision, but there was no time to waste to receive confirmation from Moscow. According to Bagramian's memoirs, taking into account the tone of Shaposhnikov's previous telegram, Timoshenko himself deeply doubted the truth of this opinion. Timoshenko ordered Bagramian to fly to Piryatin and verbally order Kirponos to "abandon the Kiev fortification area and, leaving the covering forces on the Dnieper River, immediately begin withdrawing the main body of forces to the defensive rear line (the Psel River)." (Note: In any case, German 17th army already had crossed this defensive line by attacking from the Kremenchug bridgehead to the east.) Kirponos was also ordered to carry out counter-attacks in Lubny and Romny areas to slow down the Panzers as much as possible. Timoshenko, who did not have the authority to issue such an order contrary to Stalin's wishes, refused to give Bagramian a written document in this regard, under the pretext that this flight could be too dangerous and such important orders should not fall into the hands of the enemy. In addition, leaving a written record of such disobedience to Stalin could have cost both their lives. However, after Bagramian delivered Timoshenko's verbal order to the commander of the Soviet Southwestern Front on September 17, Kirponos avoided implementing it until reception of written confirmation. Ignoring Bagramian's protests, he had decided to send a telegram to Moscow to receive confirmation.

On the same day, Shaposhnikov and Vasilevsky "in a difficult conversation" were once again trying to convince Stalin to withdraw Kirponos' forces. Stalin accused the commanders of the Red Army of "weak resistance against the enemy" and agreed only to the withdrawal of the 5th and 37th armies to better defensive positions. Despite the breakdown in communications, Kirponos finally received a withdrawal confirmation from Shaposhnikov on the night of 17 September, but he was allowed only to leave Kiev, not to retreat all the way to the Psel river. However, a few hours before the arrival of this order, Kirponos, on his own initiative, ordered the Soviet 5th, 21st and 37th armies to attack to the east to break the Germans armored wall. The 38th and 40th armies, from outside the encircled area, were also tasked to protect the flanks by attacking Romny and Lubny in the north and south, respectively. However, they were under attack from all directions and so it was not possible to carry out a coordinated retreat.

Many of the Red Army forces' efforts to break out of encirclement were made in a chaotic and unplanned manner. Most of these efforts had no organization and were accompanied with heavy casualties. The attempts to break the encirclement were generally made by a mass of infantry with little artillery support. However, the numerical superiority was often high enough that their efforts were not always fruitless. The attack of the Red Army forces from the east on 18 September partially split the German defense and penetrated to one kilometer from Romny. At this time, Romny was the headquarters of Panzer Group 2. Against the attack of two tank brigades, two rifle divisions and one or two cavalry divisions of the Red Army, Guderian had only two battalions of the 10th Motorized Infantry Division and a few anti-aircraft guns. The Soviet Air Force was able to gain local superiority, and targeted Romny with its heavy bombers. Guderian requested help from the 14th Division of the Panzer Group 1 and ordered the transfer of a part of the SS Das Reich and 4th Panzer divisions from the inner ring to this location. The arrival of the SS division on 19 September and the 4th Panzer Division launching a counterattack from the south prevented the loss of Romny to the Soviets. Despite holding Romny, Guderian moved his headquarters to Konotop.

Elsewhere, the encircled forces east of Priyatin launched a powerful attack against the positions of the German 35th Infantry Regiment of the 25th Infantry Division and by defeating them, temporarily broke the German line. The Panzer regiment of the 9th Panzer Division covered this breach with a successful counterattack. On the morning of 21 September, the attacks of the Red Army against the center of the 239th Infantry Division of the German XI Army Corps front line not only caused a deep breach but also surrounded the German 372nd Infantry Regiment. Lieutenant General Joachim von Kurtzfleisch, commander of the XI Army Corps, ordered a small force to be sent to this point from three other directions. At the same time, another breakthrough was achieved, this time on the left flank of the German 125th division of this Corps. These breaches caused the front line of the units to be mixed up and created a confused situation for the forces of both armies; noting that, a German soldier wrote in his memoirs: "Often one does not understand who is surrounded; Bolsheviks or us!"

== Destruction of the pocket ==
On 1 September, the Soviet Southwestern Front had 850,000 troops (including 90,000 reserves and rearguard units), 3,923 cannons and mortars, 114 tanks and 167 combat aircraft. The area included 452,700 troops, 2,642 cannons and mortars, and 64 tanks. The Luftwaffe had absolute air superiority over the region by employing the II and V Air Corps. Despite supply problems, the Luftwaffe's air attacks caused significant damage to the encircled Soviet forces and disrupted their movements. The Luftwaffe 5th Air Corps carried out more than 1,400 sorties and dropped around 570,000 kilograms of bombs on the enemy between 12 and 21 September, causing the destruction of nearly 2,200 motor vehicles and 100 Soviet aircraft. The Luftwaffe suffered only 27 casualties and 17 aircraft shot down.

The Germans divided the encircled forces of the Soviet Southwestern Front into small isolated parts and destroyed them one by one by tightening the ring. The advance of the German 17th army to the east increased the distance between the besieged forces of the Soviet Southwestern Front and the rest of the Red army. The XLVIII Motorized Corps and 11th Panzer Group had not only kept the southern part of the eastern wall of the pocket but also made the area more compact by attacking from the west. Simultaneously, the LI Army Corps of the German 6th army made a significant advance to the south against the scattered resistance of the northern flank of Kirponos. This corps linked up with elements of the XXXIV Army Corps, which had gained a new frontline at Rzhishchev, south of Kiev, to cut the encircled area in half. The actions of the Germans caused great confusion among the forces of the Soviet Southwestern Front. The disconnect between the Red Army units deprived it of the ability to coordinate and send orders. On 18 September, the Soviet 21st Army headquarters personnel, including three generals, were captured by the 4th Panzer Division.

The next day, the pocket was divided into three parts. The largest part was around Borispol, south-east of Kiev, and consisted mainly of troops of the Soviet 37th Army. The other two major areas were a circular area west of Orzhitsa with the forces of the Soviet 26th Army, and the area between Piryatin and Lokhvitsa with the remnants of the Soviet 5th and 26th Armies, commanded by Kirponos. The Soviet 5th and 21st armies was defeated by 23 September, and the Soviet 26th Army in the Orzhitsa region was defeated by 26 September. Small groups of Red Army soldiers were still scattered over a wide area, and some of these troops tried to escape in different ways, including in civilian clothes. Only about 15,000 managed to get out of the pocket by 2 October, including Vlasov, the commander of the 37th Army, Kostenko, the commander of the 26th Army, and Kuznetsov, the commander of the 21st Army, and Bagramian.

In addition to tactical and operational issues, the security of the forces inside the city made the command of the German 6th Army decide that until the surrounding area of the Kiev was completely cleared of any form of resistance, the German troops were allowed to stay in it only with the written permission of its headquarters. At the same time, a decree was issued in connection with the control of depots and maintaining order in Kiev.

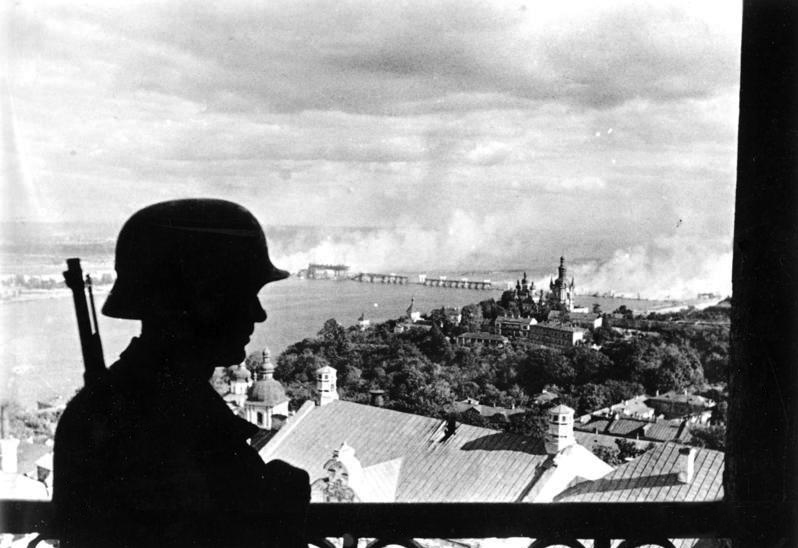
A German guard in the Pecherska Lavra bell tower, 20 September 1941

The battle for Kiev itself began on 16 September with the assault of the General-Lieutenant Hans von Obstfelder XXIX Army Corps of the German 6th Army. The 71st and 296th infantry divisions were at the front of this offensive, breaking through the Soviet defensive positions. They were assisted by the 95th Infantry Division and the 3rd Battalion of the 77th Sturmgeschütz Regiment. Inside the city, the Soviet government tried to encourage the defenders to continue their resistance by broadcasting Stalin's speeches through loudspeakers. Kiev was captured by German forces on 19 September but the clashes over this city continued until 24 September. Before its capture, important materials were evacuated from Kiev and the railway lines were destroyed by the retreating Soviets.

On 19 September, the German 99th Light Division discovered explosive traps that had been placed in large buildings suitable for deploying troops and headquarters. Attempts were made to find and disarm these traps, but on 24 September, an explosion next to the main post office in a captured weapons and ammunition depot started a large fire that quickly spread. The firefighters of the Sachsen regiment were not able to extinguish the fire. To contain the fire, the 99th sapping Battalion and the demolition squads of the 71st and 99th Infantry Divisions cleared a large area as a fire break. The fire was finally extinguished on 29 September with the help of German soldiers, emergency units and other local and German firefighters. About 200 Germans died in the initial explosions or subsequent fires, and 10,000 to 25,000 civilians were left homeless. "Partisans and Jews" were accused to be responsible of these events. The headquarters of the 195th military administration was removed from Kiev and the responsibility of city administration was entrusted to the commander of the 113th infantry division. After those events, a two-day massacre of 33,000 Jews in Babi Yar took place.

As a result of the battle in the Kiev region, four Soviet field armies including the 5th, 21st, 26th, and 37th armies with 43 divisions were completely destroyed. As a result of the fighting during September, according to official German reports, about 665,000 Red Army troops were captured, and 824 tanks, 418 anti-tank guns, and 3,000 artillery pieces were destroyed. However, the official history of the Soviet Union admits that the southwestern front had suffered heavy losses before the battle of Kiev, and claims that it is unlikely that the number of prisoners was more than 222,000. On the other hand, there are no clear statistics on the amount of casualties of the German units involved in the battle of Kiev, but the quoted reports indicate that the Wehrmacht suffered heavy losses.

Statistics of the Wehrmacht High Command on the amount of Soviet prisoners and material losses in the battle of Kiev
	Prisoners	Tanks	Artillery and Anti-tank guns
Army Group South
Pocket (September 11 to 26)	440,074	279	106
Kremenchuk area (August 31 to 11 September)	41,805	279	106
Gornostaypol area (September 4 to 10)	11,006	6	89
Army Group Center
From time of Gomel area (August 20 to 10 September)	132,985	301	1,241
Pocket (September 11 to 26)	39,342	72	273
Total	665,212	824	3,436

The aerial blockade of the region was not completed and a number of senior Soviet commanders, including Budyonny, Timoshenko and Khrushchev, were able to escape by aircraft. By the evening of 20 September, Kirponos, together with the forces of the Soviet 5th Army, was able to reach Dryukovshchina, 15 kilometers southwest of Lokhvitsa. The Red Army column was attacked by the 3rd Panzer Division in this region. The Germans captured General Sotensky, the artillery commander of the Soviet 5th Army, and drove the enemy forces into the Shumikovo forests. Kirponos, Potapov, the commander of the Soviet Fifth Army, their staff officers and about 2,000 Soviet troops continued to fight for several more hours. Kirponos was leading his troops near the front line when he was seriously wounded in the left leg and taken deep into the forest. Shortly afterwards a mortar shell landed near him, killing him. With Kirponos killed, the remaining Soviet elements surrendered. Mykhailo Burmystenko, the commissar of the Soviet Southwestern Front, a member of the Central Committee of the Soviet Union Communist Party and the second secretary of the Communist Party of Ukraine, who died in this battle, was the highest-ranking Soviet communist leader who was killed during World War II.

== Consequences ==
The battle of Kiev can be considered an unprecedented defeat for the Red Army, which caused more damage than the battles of Minsk and Smolensk. The counter-attacks of the Soviet Bryansk front to prevent those incidents were unsuccessful and caused the loss of about 100,000 soldiers and 140 tanks out of an initial 260,000 soldiers and 260 tanks. After these defeats, the Bryansk front was in a chaotic state, and less than three weeks later, when the Wehrmacht's concentrated offensive towards Moscow began, it had only 200,000 troops to face it. With the Southwestern Front completely destroyed, the Soviets were forced to rebuild it from scratch and to fill the gap created in the south of the front line, transfer its forces from the central sector.

The victory in Kiev was considered one of the prerequisites for the advance of the Army Group Center. Once it was achieved, the German Army High Command and the Wehrmacht High Command (OKW), returned their focus to the central part of the front, and resumed their push to Moscow. With their success in the Kiev region, new hope was immediately created amongst German command about the success of this front. The destruction of the Soviet Southwestern Front opened the way for Army Group South to advance to the east of Ukraine without facing any resistance force. In addition, the large amount of equipment captured in the Kiev region enabled the Wehrmacht to advance without waiting for resupply. Finally, during the eight weeks that the Battle of Kiev was going on, Army Group Center had the opportunity to recover and strengthen its worn-out forces and improve their supply situation, and its infantry divisions were able to join the motorized forces at the front line in a relatively slow march to the east.

The battle of Kiev also delivered some positive results for the Soviet Union. Panzer Group 2's southward advance to encircle the Soviet Southwestern Front delayed the German advance toward Moscow for a month, and that eventually dragged the Wehrmacht's operations into winter, which turned out to be costly. However, the Red Army lost significant forces, which could have been used for defending Moscow. In addition to dominating the vital economic lands of the Soviet Union, the Wehrmacht secured the southern flank of its Army Group Center and dealt a heavy blow to the Soviet Bryansk Axis forces, making its path towards Moscow smoother. Zhukov said about this:

We can imagine that without operation [in the direction of Ukraine], the situation of the German Army Group Center could have been even worse than it was found to be. Reserve forces of the [Soviet] High Command, which had been used in September to fill the gaps in the southwestern sector, could have been used in an attack on the flank and rear of the central group of the German armies advancing on Moscow.

Beyond the operational issues, in the strategic dimension, the victory was popularized to try to convince Turkey to join the war on the Axis side and to convince Finland to increase its participation. In that way, Germany could also put Iran under pressure in the south for which Britain and the Soviet Union had plans.

The damage caused to the German forces as a result of the explosive traps that were planted in Kiev by the Soviets caused a change in the Wehrmacht's approach to capturing large cities in the continuation of Operation Barbarossa. Hitler forbade accepting such risks again and conquering large fortified cities with direct attacks, especially without Panzer units; rather, it was decided that the cities should be left behind and besieged by artillery fire and air attacks. During the final attack on Moscow, on 7 October, Hitler used that strategy and prohibited the entry of troops into those cities.

The encirclement of the Kiev region was the last successful major breakthrough of the Wehrmacht's Panzer forces over a long distance that the Germans carried out in the Soviet Union.

== Civilian impact ==
Despite the order for wholesale destruction of Kiev issued in the Supplement to Directive 34 from 12 August, the city was spared, to Hitler's fury, as there had been no fighting within. The German troops, who occupied Kiev on 19 September, were surprised by a series of explosions from Soviet radio-mines in the city centre from 24 September onwards, the first of which also killed a number of local civilians reporting at the German Field Command to surrender outlawed items. The resulting fire, which was not put out until 29 September, was used by the Nazi authorities as a pretext to commence the mass murder of Jews in Babi Yar on the same day. As the city had not been razed, the German leadership launched the plan to starve it while officially attributing the food shortages to the consequences of Soviet economic policies. Ultimately the implementation of the Hunger Plan in occupied Kiev was restrained by the fears of an uprising behind the lines, and the city was only forcibly evacuated and subjected to widespread looting and burning during the German withdrawal in September–November 1943.

== Sources ==
- Anderson, Duncan; Clark, Lloyd; Walsh, Stephen (2001). The Eastern Front. MBI Publishing Company. ISBN 0-7603-0923-X.
- Berkhoff, Karel C. (2004), Harvest of Despair: Life and Death in Ukraine under Nazi Rule, Cambridge, MA: Belknap, ISBN 978-0-674-01313-1
- Blau, George (1955), The German Campaign in Russia: Planning and Operations (1940–1942) (PDF), Washington, DC: Department of the Army, archived from the original (PDF) on 20 September 2015
- Clark, Alan (1965). Barbarossa: The Russian–German Conflict, 1941–45. London: William Morrow and Company.
- Cumins, Keith (2011). Cataclysm: The War On The Eastern Front 1941–1945. Hellion & Company. ISBN 978-1-907677-23-6.
- Epstein, Catherine (2015), Nazi Germany: Confronting the Myths, Chichester: Wiley, ISBN 978-1-118-29479-6
- Fritz, Stephen G. (2011). Ostkrieg: Hitler's War of Extermination in the East. The University Press Of Kentucky. ISBN 978-0-8131-3417-8.
- Fugate, Bryan I. (1984). Operation Barbarossa: Strategy and Tactics on the Eastern Front, 1941. US: Presido Press. ISBN 978-0-907590-27-9.
- Glantz, David (1995). When Titans Clashed: How the Red Army Stopped Hitler. Lawrence: University Press of Kansas. ISBN 978-0-7006-0899-7.
- Glantz, David (1999). Forgotten Battles of the German-Soviet War (1941–1945). vol. 1 The Summer–Fall Campaign (22 June–4 December 1941).
- Glantz, David (2001). The Soviet–German War 1941–1945: Myths and Realities: A Survey Essay. Archived from the original on 22 July 2017.
- Glantz, David (2011). Barbarossa Derailed: The Battle for Smolensk, Volume 2. Birmingham: Helion & Company. ISBN 978-1-9060-3372-9.
- Glantz, David; House, Jonathan (2015). When Titans Clashed: How the Red Army Stopped Hitler. University Press of Kansas. ISBN 9780700621217.
- Kamenir, Victor J. (2009). The Bloody Triangle: The Defeat of Soviet Armor in the Ukraine, June 1941. Zenith Press. ISBN 978-0-7603-3434-8.
- Kirchubel, Robert (2013). Operation Barbarossa: The German Invasion of Soviet Russia. Osprey Publishing. ISBN 978-1-78200-408-0.
- Klink, Ernst (1998). Germany and the Second World War: The Attack on the Soviet Union. Oxford University Press. ISBN 0-19-822886-4.
- Krivosheev, Grigori F. (1997). Soviet Casualties and Combat Losses in the Twentieth Century. London: Greenhill Books. ISBN 978-1-85367-280-4.
- Liedtke, Gregory (2016). Enduring the Whirlwind: The German Army and the Russo-German War 1941–1943. Helion and Company. ISBN 978-1-910777-75-6.
- Mitcham, Samuel (2008). The Rise Of The Wehrmacht: The German Armed Forces And The World War II Volume 1. Greenwood Publishing Group. ISBN 978-0-275-99659-8.
- Murray, Williamson; Millet, Alan (2001). A War To Be Won: Fighting the Second World War. Harvard University Press. ISBN 978-0-674-00680-5.
- Snyder, Timothy (2010), Bloodlands: Europe between Hitler and Stalin, New York: Basic Books, ISBN 978-0-465-00239-9
- Stahel, D. (2012). Kiev 1941: Hitler's Battle for Supremacy in the East. London: Cambridge University Press. ISBN 978-1-107-01459-6.
- Makar, I. P. (24 May 2022). "Киевская операция 1941". Great Russian Encyclopedia.
