= Korneychuka Street =

Street in Moscow, Russia

Coordinates: 55°53′34″N 37°37′35″E

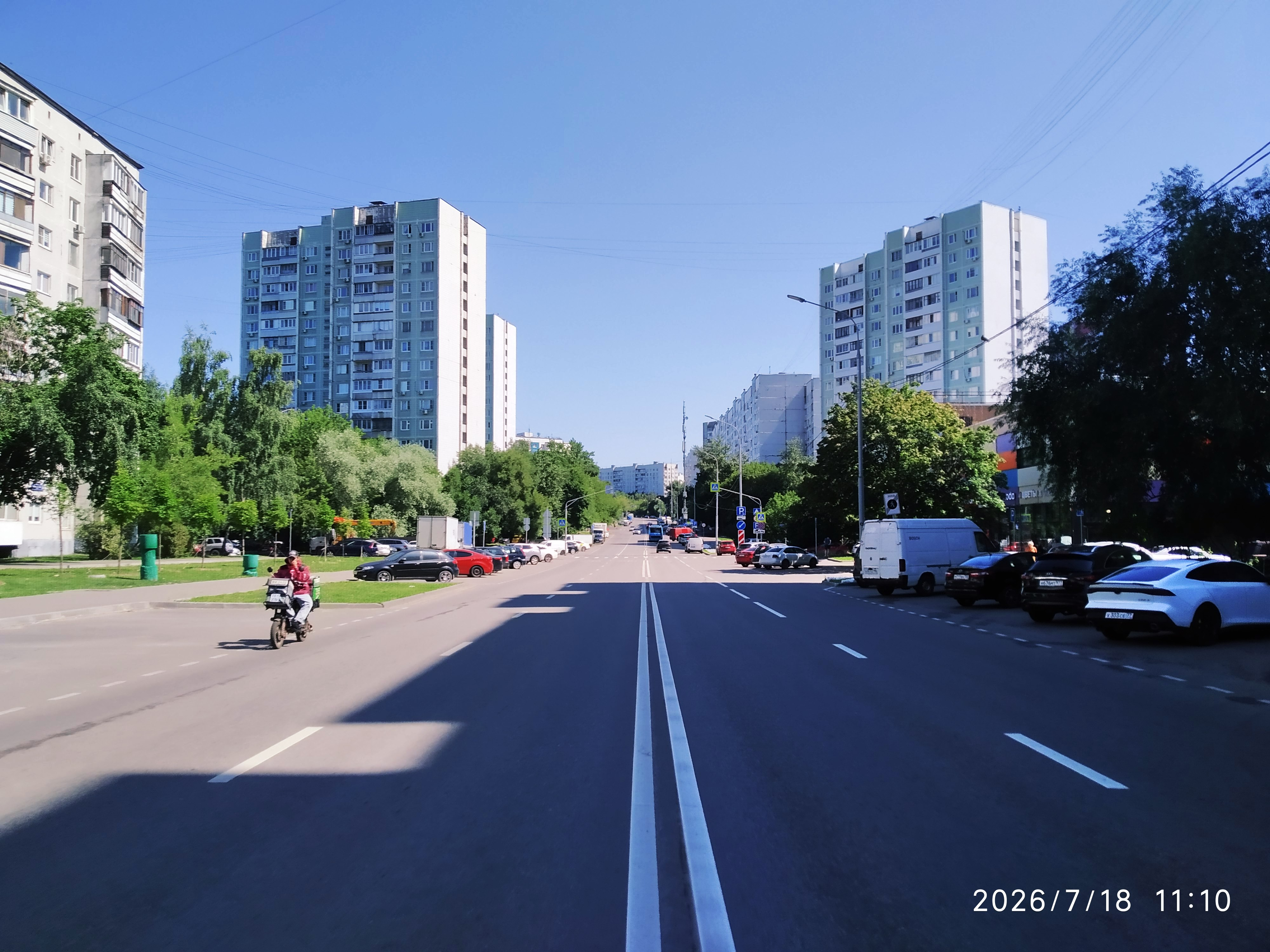
- Interactive map of Korneychuka Street
- Native name: Улица Корнейчука (Russian)
- Length: 2,600 m (8,500 ft)
- Postal code: 127543

Construction
- Construction start: 1977

Korneychuka Street (Russian: Улица Корнейчука) is a street in the Bibirevo District, North-Eastern Administrative Okrug, Moscow.

== Location ==
Korneychuka Street is one of the northernmost streets of Moscow within the Moscow Ring Road, and is on the outskirts of Bibirevo District, some 2.67 kilometres (1.66 miles) from Bibirevo metro station. It intersects with Melikhovskaya and Leskov Streets. The course of the Chermyanka river passes close to the street along an underground conduit, before re-emerging above ground near Leskov Street.

== History ==
The area now occupied by Korneychuka Street, and several of the surrounding streets, was formerly the village of Podushkino, which in the 19th century consisted of 27 yards, with a population of 91. The village was incorporated into the city districts in 1960 and began to be redeveloped. The last residential building in the former village of Podushkino was demolished in 1976. The majority of construction along the street was carried out between 1977 and 1980, and consisted primarily of 9-storey buildings, with a number of 12- and 16-storey buildings. In 1977 the street was named after Ukrainian playwright and literary critic Oleksandr Korniychuk, who had died in 1972.

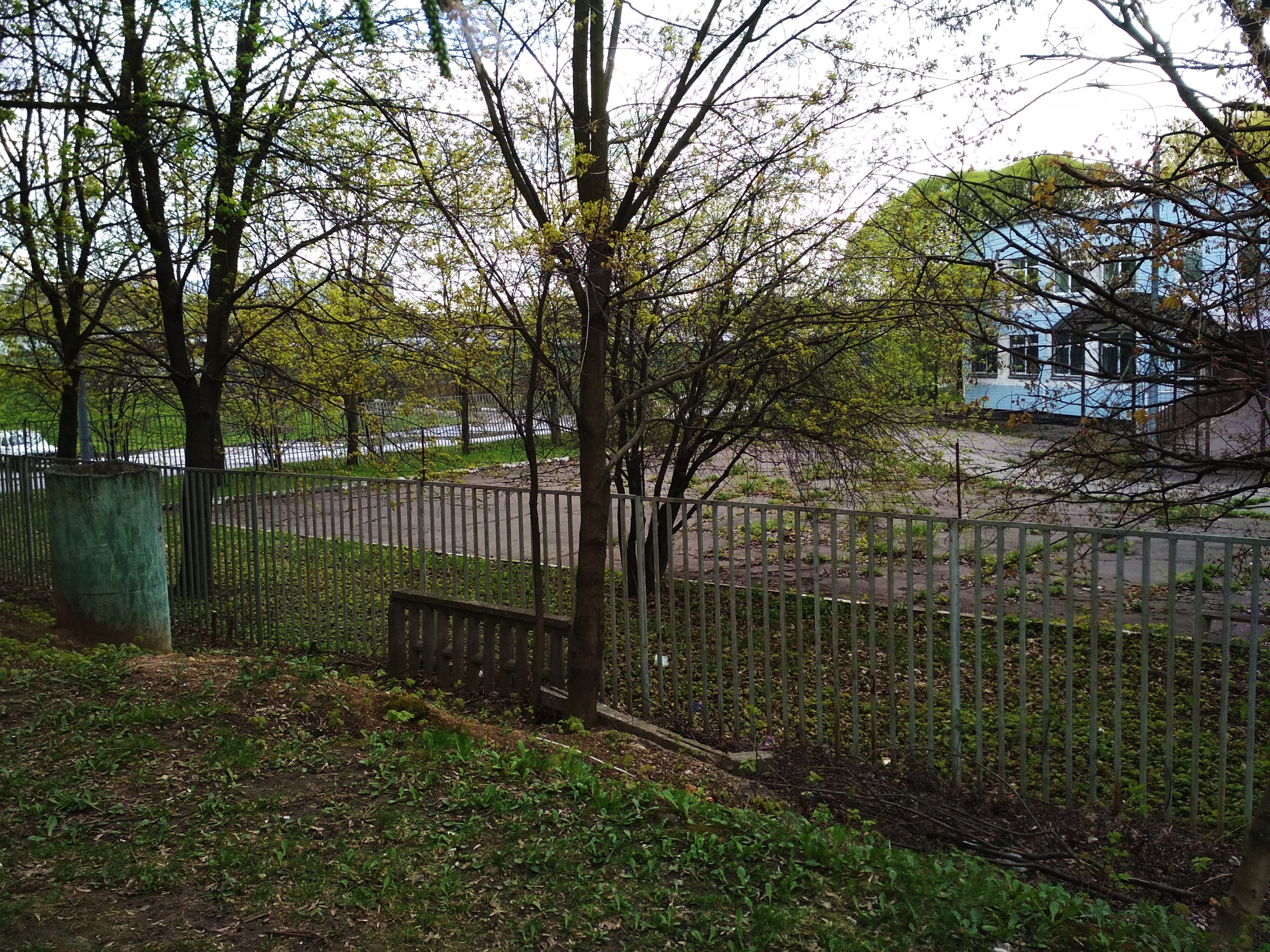
Former department of Moscow Federal Migration Service in 2021

In the 2000s, it was the location of the central office of the Moscow Department of the Federal Migration Service, with a cage for people. In 2011 a mass stabbing took place on the street.

The street goes around the Bibirevo ethnographic village.

== Sources ==
- Общемосковский классификатор улиц Москвы ОМК УМ
- Имена московских улиц. Топонимический словарь / Р. А. Агеева, Г. П. Бондарук, Е. М. Поспелов и др.; авт. предисл. Е. М. Поспелов. — М.: ОГИ, 2007. — 608 с. — (Московская библиотека). — ISBN 5-94282-432-0
