= Chairman of Central Executive Committee (Ukraine) =

Position in Soviet Ukraine

Chairman of Central Executive Committee of Ukraine Голова ЦВК УСРР
- Appointer: All-Ukrainian Congress of Soviets
- Term length: Resignation, dismissal or new convocation of congress of Soviets.
- Inaugural holder: Yukhym Medvedev
- Formation: 28 December 1917
- Final holder: Hryhoriy Petrovsky
- Abolished: 25 July 1938

The Chairman of CEC USRR (Ukrainian: Голова ЦВК УСРР, romanized: Holova TsVK USRR) was the speaker of the Central Executive Committee, Ukraine SSR's unicameral parliament. On July 25, 1938 it was replaced with the Chairman of the Presidium of the Supreme Soviet of the Ukrainian SSR.

From December 30, 1922 to January 12, 1938 the position was also co-chairman of the Central Executive Committee of the Soviet Union.

== List of chairmen ==
- 28 December 1917 - 17 March 1918—Yukhym Medvedev
- 25 March 1918 - 18 April 1918 -- Volodymyr Zatonsky
- 10 March 1919 - 25 July 1938—Hryhoriy Petrovsky
