= Galyna Skibo =

Ukrainian scientist

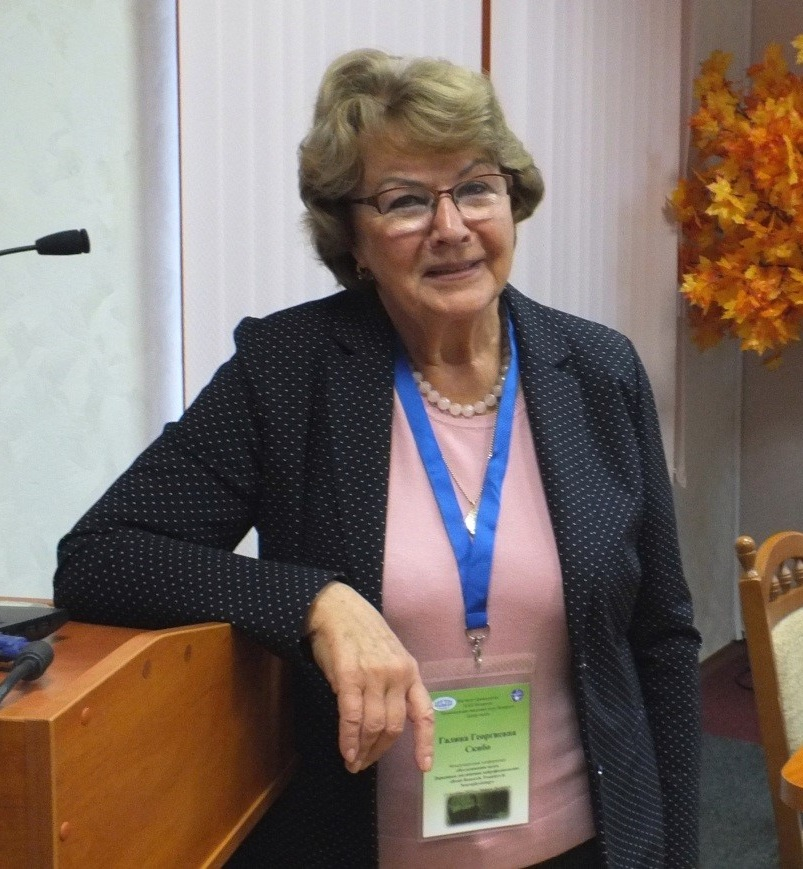
- Born: 22 June 1940; Moscow
- Citizenship: Ukraine
- Education: Bogomolets National Medical University
- Scientific career
- Fields: Physiology, Neuroscience
- Workplaces: Bogomoletz Institute of Physiology; Taras Shevchenko National University of Kyiv
- Thesis: Transfer of afferent impulse through the medial nucleus of Burdach (1968)
- Academic advisors: Platon Kostyuk

Galyna Grygorivna Skibo (Ukrainian: Галина Григорівна Скибо; June 22, 1940) is a Ukrainian scientist, doctor of medical sciences, professor, corresponding member of the National Academy of Sciences of Ukraine (2018), laureate of the awards of the National Academy of Sciences of Ukraine named after O.O. Bogomolets (1996) and P.G. Kostiuk (2019), winner of the State Prize of Ukraine in the field of science and technology (2013), Honored Worker of Science and Technology of Ukraine (2006), head of the Cytology department of the Bogomoletz Institute of Physiology NAS of Ukraine, professor of NSC "Institute of Biology and Medicine" of Taras Shevchenko National University of Kyiv.

== Biography ==
Galyna Skibo was born in Moscow in a military family. In 1957, she graduated from Moscow High School No.626 (now school No.1258 with in-depth study of the German language). In the same year, she moved to Kyiv because of her father's business needs, where she entered the pediatric faculty of Bogomolets National Medical University, and graduated in 1963. She began her research career in 1963 in the laboratory of physiology and biophysics of the nerve cell of the Institute of Physiology as a PhD student of Platon Kostyuk. From 1996 to the present, Galyna Skibo is the head of the Cytology department of the Bogomoletz Institute of Physiology of the National Academy of Sciences of Ukraine.

She has a daughter Olena and two grandchildren, Olexandra and Grygoriy.

== Research activities ==
Galyna Skibo is one of the leading neuromorphologists of Ukraine. Her scientific activity is aimed to study the structural features of the brain in the normal conditions, in the process of its development and in modeling various pathological conditions of the central nervous system.

She defended her dissertation on "Transfer of afferent impulses through the medial nucleus of Burdach" (1968), as well as a doctoral dissertation on "Structural foundations of cell neurogenesis in dissociated nerve tissue culture" (1989).

Under the leadership of Galyna Skibo, it was the first time in Ukraine established and successfully used nerve cell culture systems (dissociated and organotypic cultures of different parts of the central nervous system), which simulate and study various pathological conditions of the nervous system, analyze the possibilities of pharmacological correction of neuropathies. Using optical and electron microscopy methods, immunohistochemistry, she also conducted detailed studies of the structural plasticity of nerve cells and brain synapses. Particular attention is paid to the study of cellular and molecular mechanisms of nerve cell damage in the development of cerebral pathologies, the influence of neuropathies on neuronal and synaptic plasticity, the participation of glial cells in the development of neurodegenerative processes.

In recent years, Galyna Skibo studies the use of cell therapy for the treatment of neurodegenerative diseases. Using in vitro and in vivo model systems, she and the staff of the Department of Cytology demonstrated the regenerative potential of stem cells, in particular induced pluripotent human cells, in ischemic brain injury.

Due to her efforts, a laboratory of neurocytology was established at the Bogomolets Institute of Physiology of the National Academy of Sciences of Ukraine in 1992, which in 1996 became the Department of Cytology. Today, the Department of Cytology is a leading research unit of the institute, which is engaged in comprehensive research in the field of nerve cell biology. The Department of Cytology uses modern methods of molecular and cell biology: light and electron microscopy, methods of histochemistry and immunohistochemistry, quantitative ultrastructural analysis, computer image analysis and morphometry, as well as mathematical modeling.

Galyna Skibo is the author of more than 300 scientific papers, including 2 monographs - "Structural patterns of neuronal development in culture" (1992), "Experimental cerebral ischemia" (2016). She publishes in such high-rated journals as Brain, Hippocampus, Stem Cells, PNAS, Stem Cells Transl Med, Eur J Neurosci, J Cell Mol Med, Neurosci Meth, J Comp Neurol, Cell Calcium. Galyna Skibo is a member of the editorial board of collective journals of the journals "Ukrainian Neurological Journal", "Pathology".

Under her scientific guidance 5 doctoral and 12 candidate dissertations were defended.

As of 01.06.2021, the h-index according to the Scopus citation database is 17.

== Social activities ==
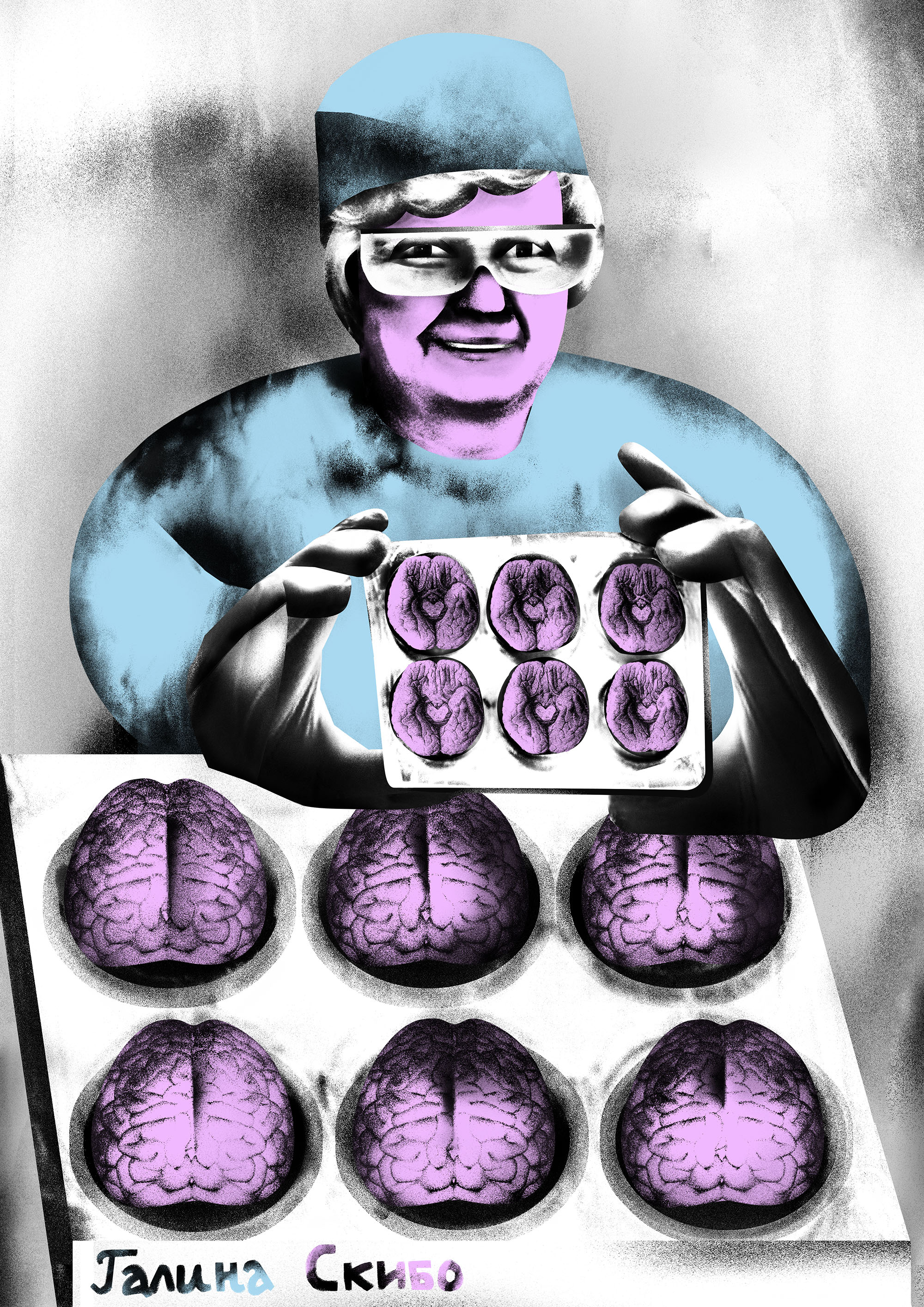
Portrait of Galina Skibo, created within the project "Science is she".

In addition to scientific research, Galyna Skibo is active in public life. She is the first woman in Ukraine to become a member of the International Rotary Club in 1994. She founded Rotary Club in Kyiv, whose activities are aimed at supporting and helping young people, providing medical equipment to children's hospitals and implementing projects aimed at strengthening the health of Ukrainian children.

In 2021, Galyna Skibo took part in the educational art project STEM is FEM "Science is she", which aims to promote scientific activities among girls and the destruction of gender stereotypes.

She was awarded the Order of Princess Olga 3d class (2003) and the Orden of Saint Vladimir 4th class (2012).
