= Mykhailo Burmystenko =

Soviet politician; Chairman of the Supreme Soviet of the Ukrainian SSR (1902–1941)

- Михайло Бурмистенко
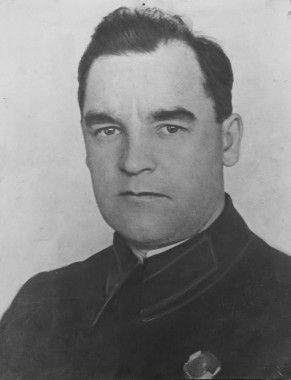
- Burmystenko in 1938

Chairman of the Supreme Soviet of the Ukrainian SSR
- In office 25 July 1938 – 20 September 1941
- Preceded by: Office established
- Succeeded by: Oleksandr Korniychuk (1947)

Personal details
- Born: 22 November 1902 Aleksandrovka, Saratov Governorate, Russian Empire
- Died: 20 September 1941 (aged 38) Poltava Oblast, Ukrainian SSR
- Party: All-Union Communist Party (bolsheviks) (1919–1941)
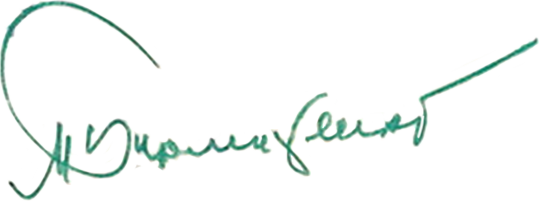
- Signature

Mykhailo Oleksiyovych Burmystenko (Ukrainian: Михайло Олексійович Бурмистенко; 22 November 1902 – 20 September 1941) was a Soviet politician who served as the chairman of the Supreme Soviet of the Ukrainian SSR from 1938 to 1941. Burmystenko died during the Battle of Kiev in 1941 and a memorial remains there in his memory.

== Biography ==
Burmystenko was born in the village of Aleksandrovka in Saratov Governorate, Central Russia.

In 1912, he graduated from the parish school in the Semirichen Oblast of Russian Turkestan, and in 1918 he graduated from the Morshansk Soviet vocational school of the 2nd degree in Tambov province. He joined the Komsomol in 1918 serving from that year into 1919 as Secretary, Chairman of the Morshan County Committee of the Komsomol of Tambov province. He joined the Communist Party of the Soviet Union (CPSU) in 1919.

From 1919 to 1920, he was an employee of the Transport Emergency Commission (CHC) of the city of Morshansk. From June – October 1920 he was Assistant Commissioner, then Commissioner. From October 1920 through May 1922 he served as head of the Information Department, Deputy Chief of the secret part of the Transport Emergency Commission (Cheka) of the city of Penza. From June – October 1922 he was the head of the Information Department of the (CHC) of the city of Pokrovsk Labor Community of the Volga Germans.

From October 1922 to September 1923, he was head of the political education department of the Regional Committee of the Komsomol of the Labor Community of the Volga Germans. In September – October 1923, he was a student at the Communist University, Petrograd.

From October 1923 to April 1924, he served with the DPU with authorization from the special department of the DPU of the 33rd Division of the Workers' and Peasants' Red Army (РСЧА) of the Western Front. From May 1924 – December 1926 he was Chief of the Political Secretariat of the Regional Military Commissariat of the USSR of the Volga Germans.

From December 1926 to March 1927, he was Deputy Editor-in-Chief, and from April – December 1927 Editor-in-Chief of the regional newspaper of the German Autonomous Soviet Socialist Republic of the Volga region "Trudovaya Pravda" in Pokrovsk.

From December 1927 to July 1929, he was a student of the editorial department of the Communist State Institute of Journalism in Moscow, where he received a diploma with his specialty in newspaper journalism.

From August 1929 to January 1932, he was Editor-in-Chief of the regional newspaper of the Autonomous Soviet Socialist Republic of the Volga region "Labor Truth" in Pokrovsk (Engelsi).

From February 1932 to November 1935, he served as 2nd Secretary of the Kalmyk Regional Committee of the CPSU.

From January 1936 to August 1937, he was an instructor, then from August 1937 to January 1938, he was Deputy Head of the Department of governing party bodies of the Central Committee of the CPSU.

From 27 January to 13 June 1938, he was Acting 2nd Secretary of the Communist Party of Ukraine (CPU). From 18 June 1938 to 9 September 1941, he served as Second Secretary of the CPU. From 27 January 1938, he was a member of the Politburo of the Central Committee of the CPU.

On 26 June 1938, he was elected as a deputy to the Supreme Soviet of the Ukrainian SSR of the USSR of the 1st convocation from the Vinnytsia city election district of Vinnytsia region. At the first session of the first elected on 25 July 1938, he was elected Chairman of the Supreme Soviet of the Ukrainian SSR.

== World War II and death ==
From the beginning of the German-Soviet War, he was engaged in the organization of sabotage units in Ukraine.

In August 1941, he was appointed a member of the Military Council of the Southwestern Front. As part of the command of the front he was surrounded during the defense of Kiev. He died on 20 September 1941 in the village of Shumeykove, near the village of Iskivtsi in the Lokhvytsky district of the Poltava oblast while trying to escape from an enemy encirclement.

== Awards and honors ==
- Order of Lenin (2 February 1939, for outstanding achievements in agriculture)
- Order of the Patriotic War of the 1st degree (posthumously)

Political offices
Preceded by position created	Chairman of Verkhovna Rada; 1938–1941	Succeeded by Oleksandr Korniychuk
