= Chairman of the Verkhovna Rada =

Presiding officer of Ukraine's unicameral parliament

Chairman of the Verkhovna Rada of Ukraine
- Голова Верховної Ради України

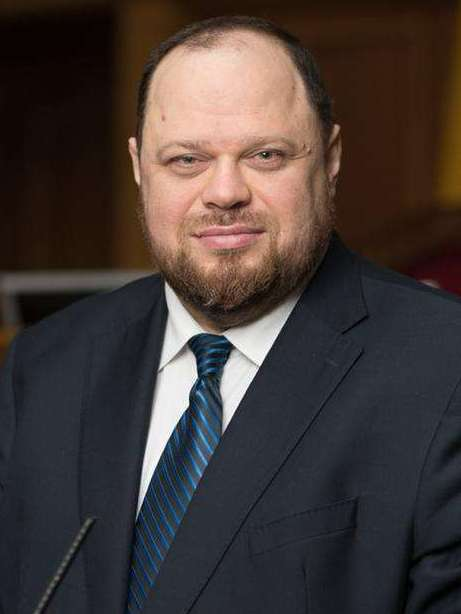
- Incumbent; Ruslan Stefanchuk since 8 October 2021
- Nominator: Verkhovna Rada
- Appointer: Secret ballot
- Term length: Five years
- Constituting instrument: Article 88, Constitution of Ukraine; Rules of the Procedures of the Verkhovna Rada
- Precursor: Chairman of Central Executive Committee (1917–1937); Chairman of the Presidium of the Supreme Soviet of the Ukrainian SSR (1937-1941, 1947–1991); Chairman of the Presidium of the Verkhovna Rada of Ukraine (1991-1996)
- Inaugural holder: Mykhailo Burmystenko
- Formation: 30 January 1937; 89 years ago (original); 28 June 1996; 30 years ago (current form)
- Deputy: First Deputy Chairman
- Salary: ₴21,144 monthly
- Website: chairman.rada.gov.ua

The chairman of the Verkhovna Rada of Ukraine (Ukrainian: Голова Верховної Ради України, romanized: Holova Verkhovnoi Rady Ukrainy) is the presiding officer of the Verkhovna Rada, Ukraine's unicameral parliament. The chairman presides over the parliament and its procedures. Chairmen are elected by open voting from the parliament's deputy ranks.

Ruslan Stefanchuk is the current chairman since being confirmed on 8 October 2021.

== History ==
The office of chairman has existed since the ratification of the Constitution of the Ukrainian Soviet Socialist Republic on January 30, 1937. Mykhailo Burmystenko, who was appointed on January 30, 1937, was the inaugural holder of the office. The post replaced the existing position of a chairman of Central Executive Committee (1917–37). Along with the chairman, from 1937 to 1996 Verkhovna Rada was also governed by the Presidium of the Verkhovna Rada that consisted of about 20 members.

There have been 18 Chairmen of the Verkhovna Rada since 1927. Until Ukraine's independence in 1991, it was titled as Chairman of the Supreme Soviet of the Ukrainian SSR.

== Mission and authority ==
According to Article 88 of the Ukrainian Constitution, the Chairman of the Verkhovna Rada is allowed to:

1. preside over meetings of parliament;
2. organize work of the Verkhovna Rada and coordinate its activities;
3. sign and promulgate acts adopted by the Verkhovna Rada;
4. represent the parliament in relation with other bodies of state power of Ukraine and with the bodies of power of other states;
5. organize the work of the staff of the parliament.

The chairman is also allowed to call special sessions of parliament, enact bills vetoed by the president only when the Verkhovna Rada votes to overcome the veto by a two-thirds majority, and participate in meetings of the National Security and Defence Council.

The chairman and his two assistants (deputy chairmen) cannot head factions of deputies.

== Head of state ==
The Chairman of the Verkhovna Rada is designated as the first in the order of succession to the presidency, with limited authority (1992–1996, 2004–2010, and 2014-Present) while new presidential elections are conducted. While the chairman serves as acting president, he is barred from taking the following actions:

- disbanding the parliament;
- appointing or submitting candidates for parliamentary approval of government posts;
- granting military ranks or state orders;
- exercising the right of pardon.

=== Succession ===
No provisions for presidential succession are explicitly proscribed in case both the president's and chairman's positions are vacant. However, in case of vacancy of the post of Chairman of the Verkhovna Rada, it is filled by deputies of the chairman.

During the Soviet era, there was one more post known as the chairman of Presidium of the Supreme Soviet of the Ukrainian SSR who was de jure head of state; the de facto head of state was the First Secretary of the Communist Party of Ukraine.

== Special state privileges ==
All former chairmen of the Verkhovna Rada receive special state privileges. After the completion of their tenure, former chairmen are provided with an office in the parliament's building, an official government car and an adviser and an aide at state expense.

The respective decree #296 was signed by Volodymyr Lytvyn as early as on June 7, 2006 – a month before he was dismissed from the post of Parliament's Speaker. After three years since its adoption, Verkhovna Rada officials kept silent about the law, after which it was made public by an article in the DELO newspaper in mid-May 2009.
