= Alexei Verkhratsky =

Ukrainian professor and researcher

- Олексій Верхратский
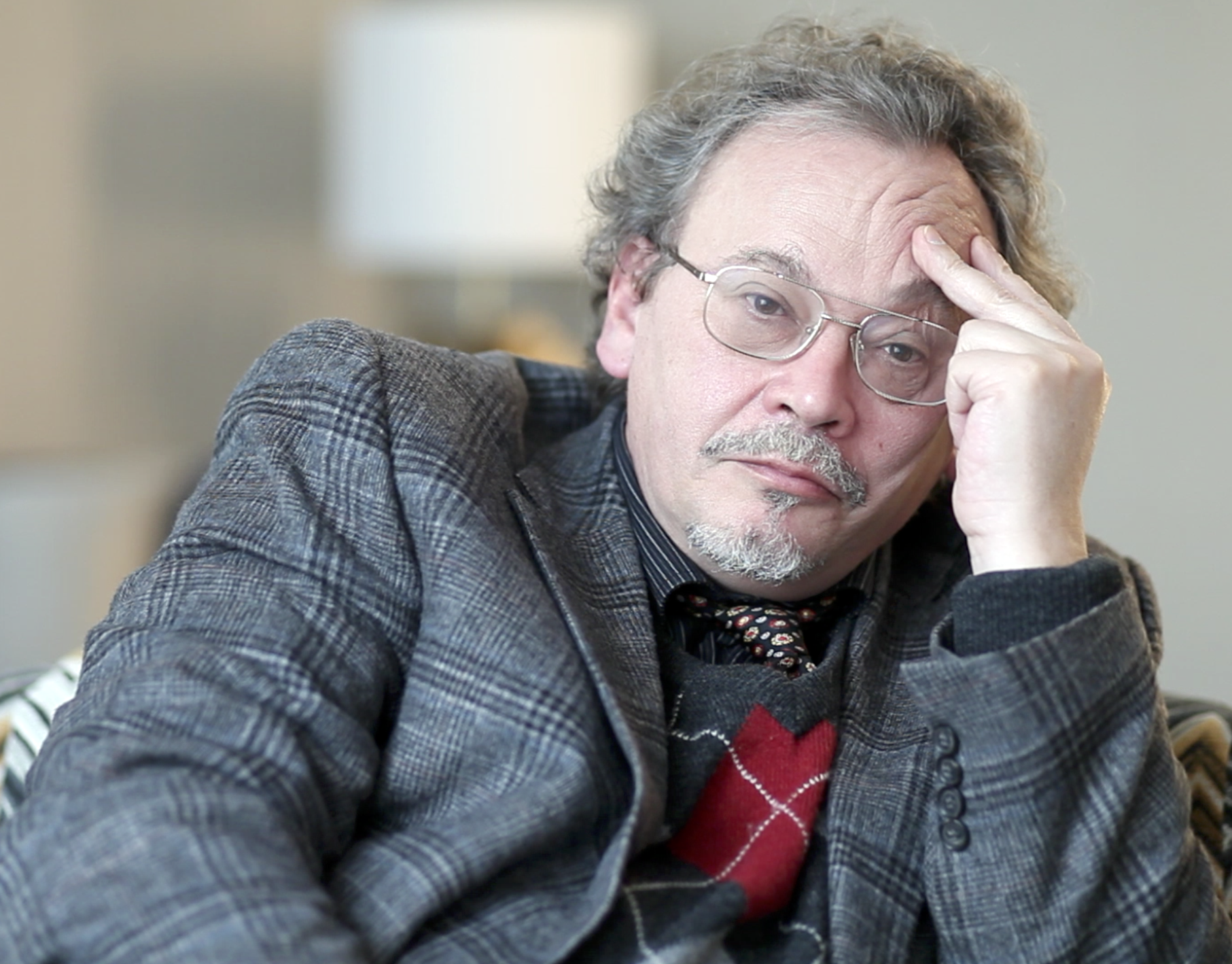
- Born: July 30, 1961; Stanislaw (Ivano-Frankivsk), Ukrainian SSR, Soviet Union
- Education: PhD, D.Sc.
- Alma mater: Bogomoletz Institute of Physiology, Kyiv Medical Institute
- Known for: Research on glial physiology and pathophysiology, calcium signalling, brain ageing
- Spouse: Irina Verkhratska
- Children: Dina
- Awards: Copernicus Gold Medal, Research Award of German Purine Club
- Scientific career
- Fields: Neurophysiology, neuroglia, neurones, how glia affects health and disease
- Workplaces: University of Manchester, Achucarro Basque Center for Neuroscience, Max-Delbrück Center of Molecular Medicine, Bogomoletz Institute of Physiology
- Theses: Mechanisms of calcium signal generation in neurones and glial cells (1993); Tetrodotoxin sensitive ionic currents in the membrane of isolated cardiomyocytes (1986)
- Doctoral advisor: Platon Kostiuk

Alexei Verkhratsky, (Ukrainian: Олексій Верхратський, Russian: Алексей Верхратский) sometimes spelled Alexej, is a professor of neurophysiology at the University of Manchester best known for his research on the physiology and pathophysiology of neuroglia, calcium signalling, and brain ageing. He is an elected member and vice-president of Academia Europaea, of the German National Academy of Sciences Leopoldina, of the Real Academia Nacional de Farmacia (Spain), of the Slovenian Academy of Sciences and Arts, of Polish Academy of Sciences, and Dana Alliance for Brain Initiatives, among others. Since 2010, he is a Ikerbasque Research Professor and from 2012 he is deputy director of the Achucarro Basque Center for Neuroscience in Bilbao. He is a distinguished professor at Jinan University, China Medical University of Shenyang, and Chengdu University of Traditional Chinese Medicine and is an editor-in-chief of Cell Calcium, receiving editor for Cell Death and Disease, and Acta Physiologica and member of editorial board of many academic journals.

== Family ==
Alexei is married to Irina Verkhratska and has a daughter, Dina. His father is Nestor Verkhratsky (Верхратський Нестoр Сергійович), a gerontologist who headed a laboratory at the Institute of Gerontology of the National Academy of Sciences of Ukraine. His mother is Nina Verzykosvka (Вержиковська Ніна Василівна), who was a head of department at the same Institute. His grandfather is Sergey Verkhratsky (Верхратський Сергій Авраaмович) (ukr) who was head of the Department of Surgery in Ivano-Frankivsk National Medical University, a renowned historian of medicine, and a decorated veteran of both World Wars having received the Order of Lenin, Order of the Red Star, and Order of the Patriotic War. His grandmother was Dina Shirman-Verkhratska (Ширман-Верхратська Діна Алексеевна), a well known gynaecologist.

== Education ==
Alexei graduated from the Kyiv Medical Institute in 1983. Staying in Kyiv, he obtained a PhD under the supervision of Prof. Platon Kostyuk from the Bogomoletz Institute of Physiology in 1986 and he received a D.Sc. from the same Institute in 1993.

== Career ==
After completing his PhD, Alexei worked as a research scientist at the Department of General Physiology of the Nervous System, Bogomoletz Institute of Physiology for several years. In 1989, he went to Heidelberg University in the laboratory of Helmut Kettenmann, who introduced Alexei to neuroglial research. Alexei also was a guest scientist at the Research Group of Cellular Neurophysiology, Max Planck Institute for Biophysical Chemistry and the Department of Cellular Neuroscience of the Max Delbrück Center for Molecular Medicine in Germany in 1992 and 1993, respectively.

In Ukraine, he was concurrently the deputy director of the International Center of Molecular Physiology of the National Academy of Sciences of Ukraine and head of the Research Group of Cellular Neuroscience, Bogomoletz Institute of Physiology. He returned to Germany in 1995 as a senior research scientist at the Department of Cellular Neuroscience in the Max Delbrück Center for Molecular Medicine. Moving to the UK in 1999, he has held multiple positions at the University of Manchester including senior lecturer, reader, professor and chairman in the School of Biological Sciences.

== Research ==
=== Glial physiology ===
In 1990, Verkhratsky discovered functional expression of low- and high-threshold Ca^{2+} channels in oligodendroglial precursors, this is the earliest finding underlying the concept of electrical excitability of NG2-glia. When working in Berlin at the Max Delbruck Center for Molecular medicine Verkhratsky Verkhratsky and Kettenmann performed numerous seminal observation of intracellular Ca^{2+} signalling and defined the concept of glial Ca^{2+} excitability. He was the first to demonstrate in situ functional expression of metabotropic purinoceptors linked to InsP_{3}-induced Ca^{2+} release in oligodendroglia and in cerebellar Bergmann astrocytes.

After moving to Manchester, Verkhratsky focused on astroglia and characterised various aspects of astrocyte membrane physiology and regulation of glial [Ca^{2+}]_{i} dynamics. In particular, he discovered functional NMDA receptors in cortical astroglia, and demonstrated their synaptic activation and contribution to astrocytic Ca2+ signalling triggered by neuronal activity. Subsequently, he identified a unique expression of highly ATP-sensitive P2X_{1/5} receptors in cortical astrocytes and characterised their role in translating neuronal synaptic activity to astroglial [Ca^{2+}]_{i} signalling.

Verkhratsky further extended the concept of astroglial excitability as "ionic" excitability mediated by major ions, which create ionic signals coordinated in space and time; these ionic signals control the activity of astroglial homeostatic cascades and link neuronal firing and synaptic transmission to astrocyte functional responses. The development of this concept begun from the very first recordings of astroglial Na^{+} signals in response to physiological stimulation in situ in cerebellar Bergmann radial astrocytes. Subsequently, Verkhratsky analysed astroglial Na^{+} dynamics associated with the activity of glial glutamate transporters that are critical for glutamate clearance and glutamatergic transmission. Verkhratsky found that activation of glial transporters either by exogenous glutamate or by activation of glutamatergic transmission results in large Na^{+} influx which generate substantial and long-lasting [Na+]_{i} transients in processes of astrocytes. Based on these observations, he proposed a new concept astroglial Na^{+} signalling. The concept of astroglial ionic excitability was further integrated in the theory of homeostatic astroglia and is closely associated with the definition of an astroglial cradle, developed with Maiken Nedergaard, that assigns to perisynaptic astrocytic processes a role of multifunctional compartment, which controls emergence, maturation, maintenance, performance and demise of synapses in the central nervous system. In a series of highly cited conceptual reviews he outlined basic principles of glial physiology and pathophysiology, which significantly influenced this rapidly developing area of neuroscience. Working with Arthur Butt, Verkhratsky published two textbooks on physiology and pathophysiology of neuroglia in 2007 and 2013 and have been the only didactic writings on neuroglia.

=== Cellular mechanisms of brain ageing ===
Verkhratsky conducted the first recordings of Ca^{2+} currents in aged sensory neurones in 1993. He subsequently pioneered cytosolic Ca^{2+} recordings in aged neurones in situ, which gave direct experimental support for multiple aspects of a "Ca^{2+} theory of ageing". Verkhratsky was the first to perform an in depth analysis of astrocytic structure and function in the ageing brain. He has demonstrated regional differences in astroglial morphological appearances, which ranged from cytoskeleton hypertrophy to cytoskeleton atrophy. He also found that large populations of astrocytes negative to classical marker GFAP but positive to glutamine synthetase or S100B protein do not show hypertrophic changes in the aged brain thus suggesting that brain senescence is not associated with widespread astrogliosis. He also performed first detailed analysis of functional properties of glutamate transporters, glutamate and purinoceptors in old astrocytes in situ and found that brain ageing is associated with significant decrease in the density of these signalling molecules.

=== Glial pathophysiology ===
Verkhratsky has developed a new concept of astroglial atrophy associated with the loss of function and glial paralysis as key elements of neuropathology; astroglial atrophy contributes to pathophysiology of several neurological diseases from neuropsychiatric disorders to neurodegeneration. First, in collaboration with Rodriguez, he discovered prominent inhibition of neurogenesis (linked to the radial astrocytes-neural stem cells) in the animal model of Alzheimer's disease. Subsequently, he discovered morphological and functional evidence for astroglial atrophy at the early stages of AD that preceded the appearance of the typical neuronal histopathology in animal models; these observations have been subsequently corroborated in experiments on astrocytes differentiated from pluripotent stem cells obtained from patients with clinically confirmed Alzheimer's disease in both familial and sporadic forms. He demonstrated deficient astrogliosis (indicative of functional atrophy) in the brain regions most vulnerable to Alzheimer-like pathology; these deficits in astroglial protection can be associated with brain region-specific alterations of the Ca^{2+} signalling toolkit. He also found that environmental stimulation (enriched environment and physical stimulation) restored AD associated glial abnormalities.

=== Physiology of neurones ===
Verkhratsky contributed to the identification of ER Ca^{2+} release mechanisms in neurones; he characterised in detail the caffeine-induced Ca^{2+} release in sensory neurones and was the first to perform real-time measurements of intra-ER Ca^{2+} dynamics in neurones to demonstrate the graded nature of Ca^{2+}-induced Ca^{2+} release. Together with Denis Burdakov, he also found and characterised the link between physiological glucose changes and excitability of hypothalamic neurones.

== Honours and awards ==
- 2019: Member, Slovenian Academy of Sciences and Arts
- 2019: Honorary professor, China Medical University, Shenyang
- 2018: Member, Polish Academy of Sciences
- 2018: Distinguished professor, Chengdu University of Traditional Chinese Medicine
- 2018: Distinguished professor, Jinan University, Guangzhou
- 2017: Honorary professor, Department of Physiology, Yeditepe University, Istanbul, Turkey
- 2016: Copernicus Gold Medal and Copernicus visiting professor, University of Ferrara
- 2013: Dozor Visiting Scholar Award, Ben-Gurion University of the Negev, Beer Sheva, Israel
- 2013: Fellow, Japan Society for the Promotion of Science
- 2013: Member, German National Academy of Sciences Leopoldina
- 2012: Member, Dana Alliance for Brain Initiatives
- 2012: Member, Real Academia Nacional de Farmacia
- 2003: Member, Academia Europaea

== Editorial commitments ==
- Editor in chief, Cell Calcium
- Receiving editor, Acta Physiologica (Oxford, England)
- Editorial board, Cell Death and Disease
- Series editor, Colloquium Series on Neuroglia in Biology and Medicine: From Physiology to Disease, editor of 8 books

== Selected publications ==
1. Verkhratsky, Alexei; Butt, Arthur (2007). Glial Neurobiology: A Textbook. John Wiley & Sons, Ltd. p. 232. doi:10.1002/9780470517796. ISBN 978-0-470-01564-3.
2. Verkhratsky, Alexei; Butt, Arthur (2013). Glial Physiology and Pathophysiology. John Wiley & Sons, Ltd. p. 556. doi:10.1002/9781118402061. ISBN 978-0-470-97852-8.
3. Burnstock, Geoffrey; Verkhratsky, Alexei (2012). Purinergic Signalling in the Nervous System. Springer Verlag. p. 715. ISBN 978-3-642-28863-0.
4. Verkhratsky, Alexei; Nedergaard, Maiken (2018). "Physiology of Astroglia". Physiological Reviews. 98 (1): 239–389. doi:10.1152/physrev.00042.2016. PMC 6050349. PMID 29351512.
5. Kettenmann, Helmut; Hanisch, Uwe-Karsten; Noda, Mami; Verkhratsky, Alexei (November 2011). "Physiology of Microglia". Physiological Reviews. 91 (2). American Physiological Society: 461–553. doi:10.1152/physrev.00011.2010. PMID 21527731.
6. Kettenmann, Helmut; Kirchhoff, Frank; Verkhratsky, Alexei (2013). "Microglia: new roles for the synaptic stripper". Neuron. 77 (1). Cell Press: 10–18. doi:10.1016/j.neuron.2012.12.023. PMID 23312512. S2CID 7153421.
7. Verkhratsky, Alexei (2005). "Physiology and pathophysiology of the calcium store in the endoplasmic reticulum of neurons". Physiological Reviews. 85 (1). American Physiological Society: 201–279. doi:10.1152/physrev.00004.2004. PMID 15618481.

== See also ==
- Changjoon Justin Lee
- Geoffrey Burnstock
- Rudolf Virchow
- Ole Holger Petersen
- Robert Zorec (sl)
