= BCAM =

BCAM may stand for:

- Basal cell adhesion molecule
- Basque Center for Applied Mathematics
- Breast Cancer Awareness Month
- Broad Contemporary Art Museum
