= Enrique Zuazua =

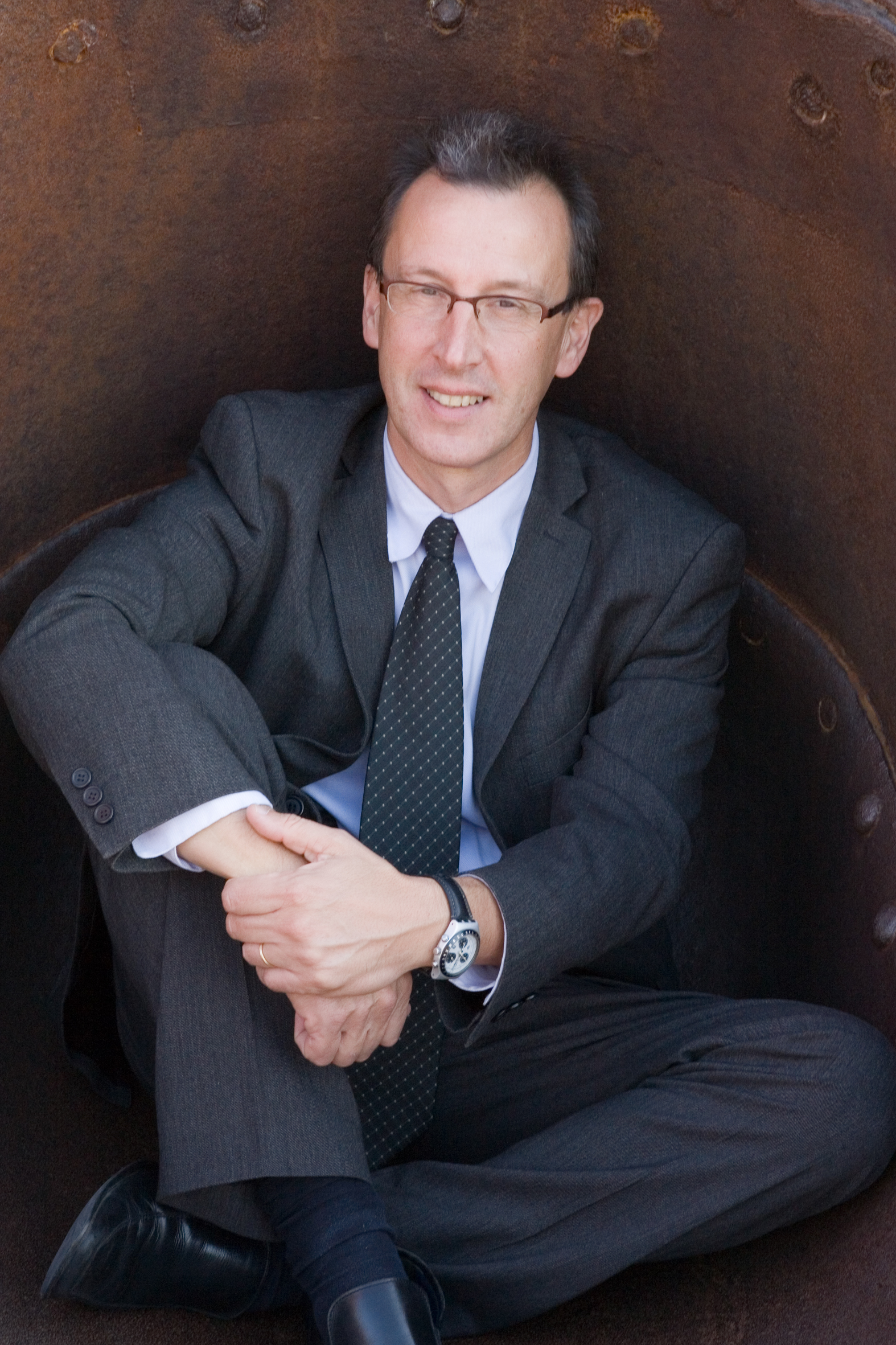
- Born: September 28, 1961 (age 64); Eibar, Gipuzkoa, Basque Country, Spain
- Awards: Alexander von Humboldt Professor at the Friedrich-Alexander University, Erlangen-Nürnberg (2015).; Ambassador of Friedrich-Alexander University, Erlangen-Nürnberg (2015).; Member of Academia Europaea (2015); Doctor Honoris Causa, Université de Lorraine, France (2014); Humboldt Research Award (2013); National Research Award / Premio Nacional de Investigación Julio Rey Pastor in Mathematics and Information Technologies and Communications Spain (2007).; Euskadi Research Award in Science and Technology, Basque Country (2006)
- Scientific career
- Workplaces: DeustoTech in the Universidad de Deusto, Universidad Autónoma de Madrid and Friedrich-Alexander University, Erlangen-Nürnberg.
- Thesis: Control y estabilización de algunas ecuaciones de evolución (1987)
- Doctoral advisor: Alain Haraux
- Doctoral students: Luz de Teresa, https://www.genealogy.math.ndsu.nodak.edu/id.php?id=88528

Enrique Zuazua (Iriondo, second family name) is the Head of the Chair for Dynamics, Control, Machine Learning and Numerics - FAU DCN-AvH (Alexander von Humboldt Professorship) at the University of Erlangen–Nuremberg (FAU). He is also Distinguished Research Professor and the Director of the Chair of Computational Mathematics of DeustoTech Research Center of the University of Deusto in Bilbao, Basque Country, Spain and Professor of Applied Mathematics at Universidad Autónoma de Madrid (UAM).

== Biography ==
Born in Eibar (Gipuzkoa-Basque Country-Spain) in 1961, after finishing his primary education at Ikastola (Basque School) and secondary education at the Eibar La Salle School, he took his baccalaureate at this town's Universidad Laboral de Eibar. In 1984 he graduated in mathematics from the Universidad del País Vasco-Euskal Herriko Unibertsitatea (UPV-EHU) before obtaining his PhD from this university in 1987, receiving the Faculty Award for Outstanding Achievements for both. In 1988 he got the PhD degree at the Laboratoire Jacques-Louis Lions of the Université Pierre et Marie Curie, funded by a doctoral fellowship of the Basque Government and a Research Grant from the Jacques Louis Lions Chair at the Collège de France.

He has authored over 430 publications and supervised more than 32 doctoral theses. His research has been funded by three European Research Council Advanced Grants (NUMERIWAVES, 2010; DyCon, 2016; CoDeFeL, 2024). He has also participated in collaborative industrial and technology transfer projects in Spain and Germany. In addition to serving on the editorial boards of leading journals in applied mathematics, he is involved in activities aimed at the public dissemination of science.

== University career ==
During the 1987–1988 academic year, he was associate professor at UPV-EHU, before becoming an associate professor in Mathematical Analysis at the Universidad Autónoma de Madrid. In 1990, he won a Professorship in Applied Mathematics at the Universidad Complutense de Madrid where he was Head of the Applied Mathematics Section at the Faculty of Chemistry and of the Applied Mathematics Department. In 2001 got an Excellence Professorship in Applied Mathematics at Universidad Autónoma de Madrid.

From 2008 to 2012 he was the Founding Scientific Director Research of the BCAM - Basque Center for Applied Mathematics, in Bilbao, Basque Country, Spain, created by the Basque Government, with the aim of promoting research into the most computational, applied and multi-disciplinary aspects of Mathematics, where he led the team on "Partial Differential Equations, Numerics and Control" until September 2015 as a Distinguished Ikerbasque Professor of the Basque Foundation for Science Ikerbasque.

He has also acted as a member of the advisory board for the launching of the Institute for Mathematical Sciences (ICMAT) , a consortium comprising the Consejo Superior de Investigaciones Científicas (Higher Council for Scientific Research, CSIC) and three Madrid Universities: the Universidad Autónoma de Madrid (UAM), Universidad Carlos III de Madrid (UC3M) and the Universidad Complutense de Madrid (UCM).

He has held Visiting Professorships at various overseas institutions, including the Courant Institute, the University of Minnesota and Rice University in the US, the Federal University of Rio de Janeiro, the Isaac Newton Institute, Cambridge, and at various French Universities including the Université Pierre et Marie Curie, Université de Paris-Sud, Versailles Saint-Quentin-en-Yvelines University, Université d'Orléans, Université de Toulouse, Université de Nice and the École Polytechnique (Paris Polytechnic School), where he held the post of Associate Professor for four academic years.

== Research ==
His domains of expertise in Applied Mathematics include Partial Differential Equations, Control Theory and Numerical Analysis. These subjects interrelate with the final to model, analyse, computer simulate, and finally contribute to the control and design of the most diverse natural phenomena and all fields of R + D + i.

Thirty two PhD students got the degree under his advice and they now occupy positions in centres throughout the world: Brazil, Chile, China, Mexico, Romania, Spain, etc. He has developed intensive international work having led co-operation programmes with various Latin American countries, as well as with Portugal, the Maghreb, China and Iran, amongst others.

He has been guest speaker in many International Conferences worldwide, with highlights including the Second European Congress of Mathematics, Budapest, 1996, ECCOMAS 2004 in Jyväskylä (Finland) the SMAI2005 Congress in Evian (France), FoCM2005 in Santander, ENUMATH2005 in Santiago de Compostela, the International Congress of Mathematicians (ICM) Madrid, 2006 and the EQUADIFF 2007 in Vienna (Austria), the von Mises Lecture of Humboldt University of Berlin, in 2008, the "Giornata INdAM", Turin, 2009, "SIMAI2010", Cagliari in 2010, the "Aachen Conference on Computational Engineering Science", Aachen, 2011 and the "PASI-CIPPDE-2012" Conference in Santiago de Chile en 2012. He has also given numerous monographic courses in research at various Centres, both in Spain and overseas. He has sat on and is still an active member of the Scientific Committee of various international events, including the International Programming Committee of ICM2006.

In 2026, he has been invited by the International Mathematical Union (IMU) to deliver a Special Section Lecture at the International Congress of Mathematicians 2026 (ICM2026) on Machine Learning and Control: Foundations, Advances, and Perspectives. The ICM2026 will take place in Philadelphia, USA.

He has developed a number of cooperative projects with industries such as AIRBUS-Spain and Arteche Group. He has also been the Principal Investigator for National Plan projects and since 1990 the co-ordinator for European and NATO project networks and the first research coordinator of the i-Math CONSOLIDER Mathematics Project (2007-2011), the Madrid project SIMUMAT (2006–2009).

He is Editor in Chief, in collaboration with Xu Zhang (Sichuan University, Chengdu, China) of the Journal Mathematical Control and Related Fields, and member of the editorial board for other journals including "" ESAIM:COCV", "Journal de Mathématiques pures et appliquées", "Mathematical Models and Methods in Applied Sciences", "Numerische Mathematik", "Systems and Control Letters", "Journal of Differential Equations", "Asymptotic Analysis" and "Journal of Optimization Theory and Applications". He also belongs to the editorial board of the Series "Mathématiques et Applications" of SMAI - Springer and "Modeling, Simulation and Applications" of Springer, coordinated by Alfio Quarteroni and coordinates the series SpringerBriefs on PDES and Data Science .

He has managed the Mathematics Programme (2001–2004) of the Spanish National Research Plan and directed and participated in various international panels belonging of the French CNRS, ANR, IUF, AERES and INRIA and the German DFG amongst other agencies. He was the chair of the European Research Council's Panel A "Advanced Grants," in Mathematics, and the CIMPA's (Centre International de Mathematiques Pures et Appliquées) Scientific Council in Nice. He is a member of the Scientific Committee of various Institutes such as the CUMP in Porto, Portugal , CERFACS in Toulouse, the Pedro Pascual de Benasque Science Center, and the UNESCO "Mathematics and Development," Chair co-ordinated by M.Jaoua.

== Dissemination activities ==
He has also written several popular science works, for which he has twice been awarded the [Sociedad Española de Matematica Applicada] (SEMA Spanish Society of Applied Mathematics) Prize for Popularising Mathematics. His articles in this field have been published in various magazines, including ARBOR, CIC-Network, SIGMA, DIVULGAMAT, La Gaceta de la Real Sociedad Matemática Española (RSME The Royal Society of Spanish Mathematics) and Transatlántica de Educación. He also founded the blog "Matemáticas y sus Fronteras" (Mathematics and its boundaries). He has been an active member of RSME and SEMA, and contributes to the editorial board of the SEMA Journal.

In the period 2009-2015, he ran, in cooperation with the journalist Xabier Lapitz a Radio Program at Onda Vasca on various topics related to Mathematics, Higher Education, and Research.

He is also the author of the columns "Matemanías" and "cons-CIENCIA" at the Basque daily newspaper Deia and the weekly one Zazpika .

He was a collaborator on Basque public radios on the broadcasts "Faktoria" in "Euskadi Irratia" (in Basque) and "Boulevard Magazine" in Radio Euskadi and within the TV shows "Azpimarra" and "Ahoz Aho" of the Basque Public TV EITB.

== Prizes and awards ==
His work has had a significant impact. He was recognised as a "highly cited researcher," by the ISI Institute (Thompson) in 2004. He received the 2006 Euskadi Prize for Science and Technology and has been nominated as a numerary of the "Jakiunde," Basque Academy of Sciences, Arts and Humanities. In 2007, he was awarded the Julio Rey Pastor National Prize for "Mathematics, Information and Communications Technology," the highest national award in these disciplines. He received his award from His Majesty the King on 15 January 2008, together with the other 2007 prize-winners (Ignacio Cirac Saturain, Carlos Duarte Quesada, Luis A. Oro Giral, and Daniel Ramón Vidal).

His paper "On the optimality of the observability inequalities for parabolic and hyperbolic systems with potentials", in collaboration with Thomas Duyckaerts and Xu Zhang, was published in Ann. Inst. H. Poincaré Anal. Non Linéaire 25 (2008), no. 1, pp. 1–41, got the 2008 Award for the best paper on that Journal.

In 2013, he received the "Research in Paris" award of the Paris City Hall , an Excellence Chair of the CIMI - Centre International de Mathématiques et Informatique de Toulouse [8] and a Humboldt Research Award [9] to develop research activities within the research group by Professor Günter Leugering at Friedrich-Alexander University, Erlangen-Nürnberg.

In 2014 he got the Doctor Honoris Causa degree from the Université de Lorraine in France [10] and in 2015 he became a member of Academia Europaea and the First Ambassador of Friedrich-Alexander University, Erlangen-Nürnberg. In 2019, he received an Alexander von Humboldt Professor for a chair in "Applied Analysis" at the Friedrich-Alexander University, Erlangen-Nürnberg. In 2022, he received the SIAM W. T. and Idalia Reid Prize for fundamental theoretical and computational contributions to the Control, Numerics, and Analysis of nonlinear PDEs and multi-physical systems with impactful scientific and industrial applications.
