= Michael Marder =

Philosopher

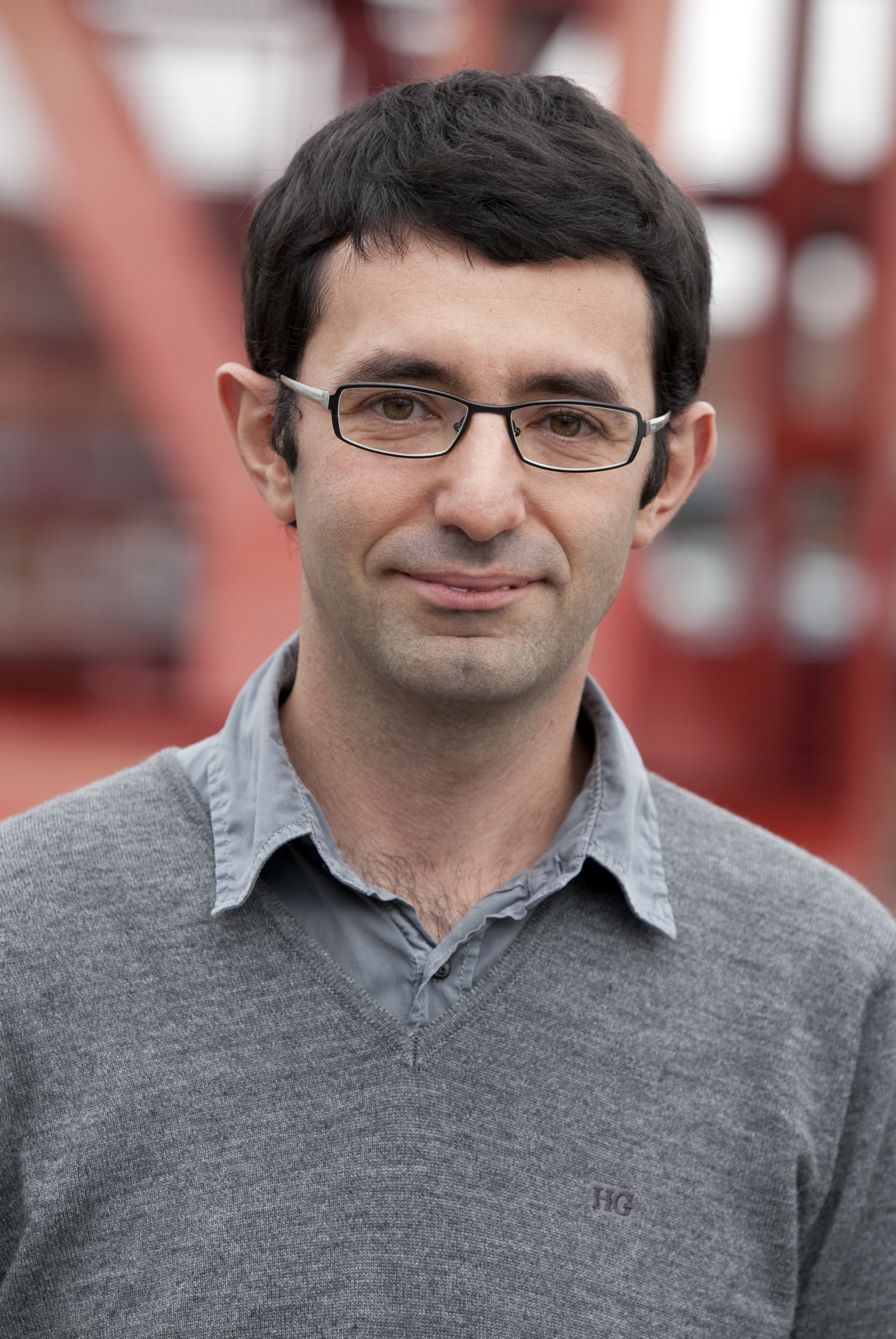
- Born: 1980 (age 45–46)

Education
- Education: New School for Social Research

Philosophical work
- Era: 21st-century philosophy
- Region: Western philosophy
- School: Continental philosophy Phenomenology
- Website: www.michaelmarder.org

Michael Marder (born 1980) is Ikerbasque Research Professor of Philosophy at the University of the Basque Country, Vitoria-Gasteiz. He works in the phenomenological tradition of Continental philosophy, environmental thought, and political philosophy.

== Education ==
Marder studied at universities in Canada and the U.S. He received his PhD in Philosophy at the New School for Social Research in New York City. Marder carried out post-doctoral research in the Department of Philosophy at the University of Toronto, and taught at Georgetown University, George Washington University, and St. Thomas More College at the University of Saskatchewan.

== Career ==
Marder carried out research in phenomenology as an FCT fellow at the University of Lisbon, Portugal, and held the position of Assistant Professor in the Department of Philosophy at Duquesne University in Pittsburgh. before accepting the Ikerbasque research professorship at the University of the Basque Country.

Marder is an editorial associate of the journal Telos (New York) and an editor of two book series: Political Theory and Contemporary Philosophy Series and Critical Plant Studies.

Much of his philosophical work has focused on building philosophies that take into account plants as beings with their own form of subjectivity, which has included showing how the field of philosophy, especially the tradition of continental philosophy, has neglected plants or treated them as "other", and how the field has been poorer for it. Dominic Pettman found Marder's book Plant-Thinking to be a work that made a substantial contribution to that nascent field, but also at times too simplistic, for example idealizing the ways that plants co-exist with other beings and not taking into account the ways that plants attack and defend against other beings.

== Bibliography ==
- Marder, Michael (2028). Fabrication : Of Intelligence and Nature. A Philosophical Fugue. Columbia University Press.
- Marder, Michael (2027). Vegetality : Learning from Seeds. University of Minnesota Press.
- Marder, Michael (2026). Elemental Emanations : Ecological Theology in Medieval Jewish Mysticism. Cambridge University Press.
- Marder, Michael (2026). Of Joints and Other Articulations : The Future of Arthrosophy. Northwestern University Press.
- Marder, Michael (2025). Fiori di fuoco : Testimoni delle ceneri. Mimesis.
- Marder, Michael (2025). Metamorphoses Reimagined. Columbia University Press.
- Marder, Michael (2025). Eco-Freud, from A to Z. Bloomsbury.
- Marder, Michael (2023). Time Is a Plant. Brill. ISBN 978-0231180597.
- Casey, Edward; Marder, Michael (2023). Plants in Place : A Phenomenology of the Vegetal. Columbia University Press. ISBN 9780231213455.
- Marder, Michael (2023). The Phoenix Complex : A Philosophy of Nature. MIT Press. ISBN 9780262545709.
- Marder, Michael (2022). Philosophy for Passengers. MIT Press. ISBN 9780262543712.
- Marder, Michael (2021). Senses of Upheaval : Philosophical Snapshots of a Decade. Anthem Press. ISBN 9781839982293.
- Marder, Michael (2021). Green Mass : The Ecological Theology of St. Hildegard of Bingen. Stanford University Press. ISBN 9781503629264.
- Marder, Michael (2021). Hegel's Energy : A Reading of The Phenomenology of Spirit. Northwestern University Press. ISBN 978-0810143395.
- Marder, Michael (2020). Dump Philosophy : A Phenomenology of Devastation. Bloomsbury. ISBN 978-1350170605.
- Marder, Michael (2019). Political Categories : Thinking Beyond Concepts. Columbia University Press. ISBN 978-0231188692.
- Marder, Michael (2018). Heidegger : Phenomenology, Ecology, Politics. University of Minnesota Press. ISBN 978-1517905033.
- Marder, Michael (2017). Energy Dreams : Of Actuality. Columbia University Press. ISBN 978-0231180597.
- Irigaray, Luce; Marder, Michael (2016). Through Vegetal Being : Two Philosophical Perspectives. Columbia University Press. ISBN 978-0231173865.
- Marder, Michael (2016). Grafts : Writings on Plants. Univocal Publishing. ISBN 9781937561673.
- Marder, Michael (2016). The Chernobyl Herbarium : Fragments of an Exploded Consciousness. Open Humanities Press. ISBN 978-1785420269.
- Marder, Michael (2016). Dust (Object Lessons). Bloomsbury Academic. ISBN 978-1628925586.
- Marder, Michael (2015). Pyropolitics : When the World Is Ablaze. Rowman & Littlefield Pub Inc. ISBN 978-1783480296.
- Marder, Michael (2014). The Philosopher's Plant : An Intellectual Herbarium. Columbia University Press. ISBN 978-0231169035.
- Marder, Michael (2014). Phenomena-Critique-Logos : The Project of Critical Phenomenology. Rowman & Littlefield Pub Inc. ISBN 978-1-78348-025-8.
- Marder, Michael (2013). Plant-Thinking : A Philosophy of Vegetal Life. New York: Columbia University Press. ISBN 978-0231161251.
- Marder, Michael (2010). Groundless Existence : The Political Ontology of Carl Schmitt. [S.l.]: Continuum. ISBN 978-1441180001.
- Marder, Michael (2009). The Event of the Thing : Derrida's Post-Deconstructive Realism. Toronto: University of Toronto Press. ISBN 978-1442612655.
