= Nicolas Achucarro Lund =

Basque neuroscientist

Nicolás Achúcarro

Nicolas Achucarro Lund (14 June 1880 – 23 April 1918) was a Basque neuroscientist, neuropathologist, and physician. A prominent member of the Spanish Histological School (also known as the Cajal School), Achucarro made seminal contributions to the study of neuroglia, neurodegenerative conditions, and histological staining techniques before his death at age 37.

The Achucarro Basque Center for Neuroscience, established in Leioa in 2012 by Ikerbasque and the University of the Basque Country, was named in his honor.

== Early life and education ==
Achucarro was born into an educated family. His father, Aniceto Achucarro, was an ophthalmologist, and his mother, Juana Lund Ugarte, was the daughter of a Norwegian merchant settled in Bilbao.

He received his secondary education at the Institute of Bilbao, where philosopher Miguel de Unamuno was among his teachers. In 1895, he spent 16 months in Germany studying at the Gymnasium of Wiesbaden. He entered the University of Madrid in 1897, where he studied under Santiago Ramón y Cajal and was introduced to histological research in the laboratory of Luis Simarro. After completing additional coursework in Marburg, Germany, he earned his medical degree in Madrid in 1904. In 1906, he defended his doctoral dissertation on brain lesions caused by experimentally induced rabies.

== Career and international research ==
To expand his clinical and laboratory training, Nicolas Achucarro worked across several major European scientific centers:

- Paris (1904–1905): Worked at the Hospice de Bicêtre under neurologist Pierre Marie and attended clinical sessions led by Joseph Babinski at the Hôpital de la Pitié.
- Florence and Munich (1905–1908): Studied under Ernesto Lugaro and Eugenio Tanzi in Florence before joining Emil Kraepelin and Alois Alzheimer in Munich. His work in Alzheimer’s laboratory proved decisive in shaping his career focus on neurohistology.

In September 1908, Achucarro moved to the United States to serve as director of the histopathology laboratory at the Government Hospital for the Insane (Saint Elizabeths Hospital) in Washington, D.C. During his tenure, he established and edited the institution's scientific journal, Bulletin of the Government Hospital for the Insane. His research contributions during this period earned him an honorary doctorate (Doctor Honoris Causa) from Yale University.

He returned to Spain in 1910 to join Santiago Ramón y Cajal's Laboratory of Biological Research in Madrid. There, Achucarro established his own research group and mentored younger scientists, most notably Pío del Río-Hortega.

== Scientific contributions ==
Achucarro published over 30 original research papers in Spanish, German, French, and English within a single decade. His core achievements include

- Functional Roles of Neuroglia: At a time when glial cells were viewed merely as passive structural framework for neurons, Achucarro proposed that astrocytes played active metabolic, secretory, and phagocytic roles.
- The Achucarro Stain: He developed a specialized histological staining technique using tannin and ammoniacal silver, which allowed researchers to visualize glial structures and connective tissue reticulin with high clarity.
- Microglial foundations: His studies on rod-shaped glial cells (Stäbchenzellen) in diseased brain tissue laid the foundation for his pupil, Pío del Río-Hortega, to formally discover and classify microglial cells in 1919.

== Personal life and health ==
In 1911, Achucarro married his cousin, Dolores Lund. In 1915, he began experiencing symptoms of Hodgkin's lymphoma, a condition he diagnosed himself. As his disease progressed, he retired to his family home in Neguri, where he died on April 23, 1918.
