= Portillo, Valladolid =

Coordinates: 41°29′00″N 4°35′00″W

Portillo
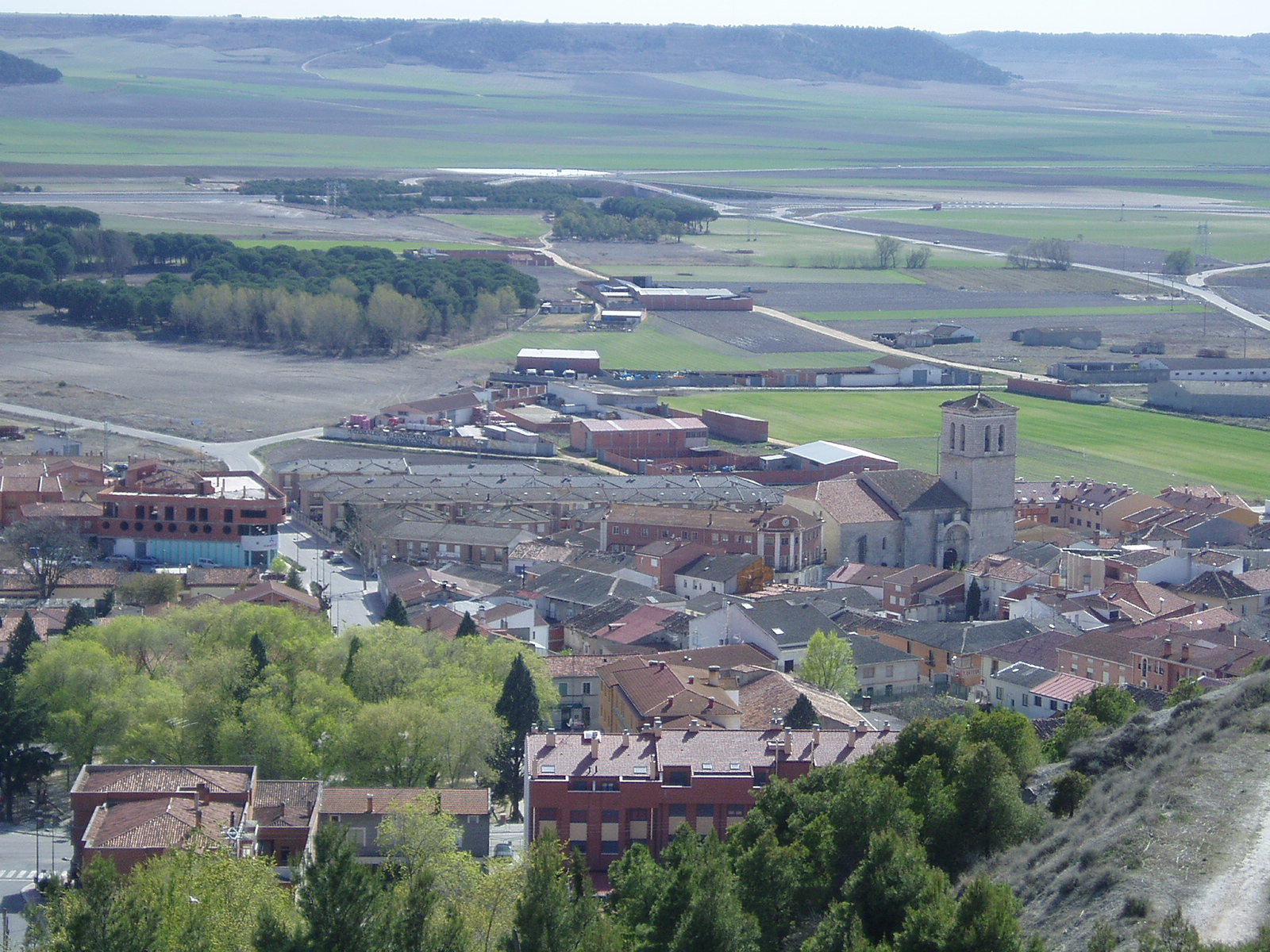
- Portillo in April 2009
- Interactive map of Portillo
- Spanish autonomous community: Castile and León
- Spanish Province: Valladolid

Population (2025-01-01)
  - Total: 2,377

Portillo is a municipality in Valladolid, Spain. In 2001 it had 2,574 inhabitants.

== Description ==
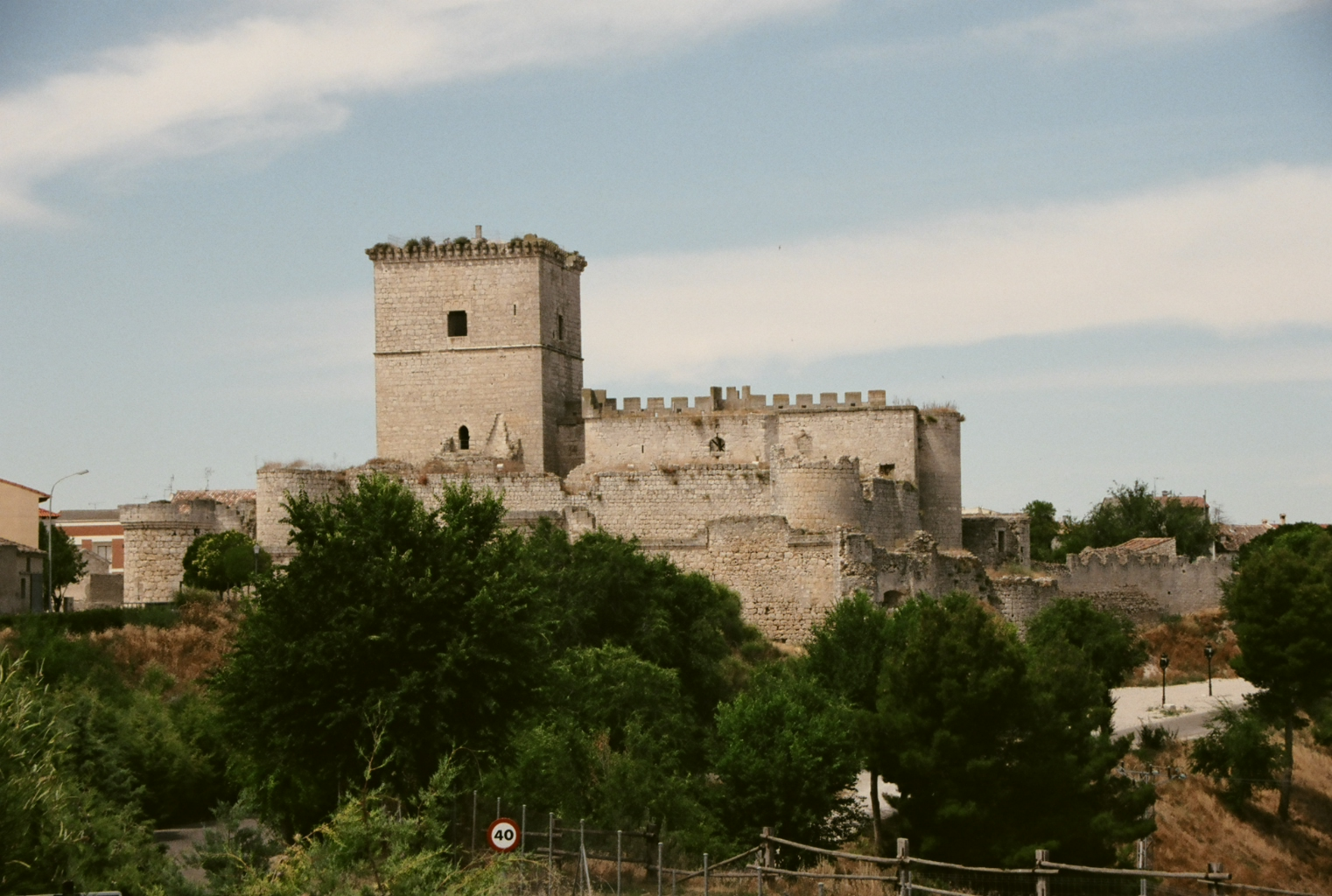
Portillo Castle

Portillo was the birthplace of neuroscientist Pío del Río Hortega, who first identified microglia.

== See also ==
- Cuisine of the province of Valladolid
