= Basque Excellence Research Centres =

Basque Excellence Research Centres are a category or type of research center funded and fostered by the Basque Government and framed in the Basque Science, Technology and Innovación network.

The Basque Excellence Research Center are characterized by their vocation to become spearheads of the Basque university system and also of the overall scientific research in the Basque Country, being their final objective to become relevant nodes of the European network of referent research organisations.

The strategic objective of the Basque Government with the BERCs is to place the Basque research capabilities on the world map of scientific discovery and knowledge creation in the research areas considered strategic, so they can act as levers for the social and economic development, by the advanced use of science, technology and innovation, as a way to improve competitiveness.

== Research Institutions ==
Currently nine research institutions have this consideration:

- Achucarro Basque Center for Neuroscience
- BC3 - Basque Center for Climate Change
- BCAM - Basque Center for Applied Mathematics
- BCBL - Basque Center on Cognition, Brain and Language
- BCMaterials - Basque Center for Materials, Applications & Nanostructures
- DIPC - Donostia Internacional Physics Center
- FBB - Fundación Biofísica Bizkaia
- MPC - Materials Physics Center
- POLYMAT - Basque Center for Macromolecular Design and Engineering
