= Luz de Teresa =

Mexican and Spanish mathematician

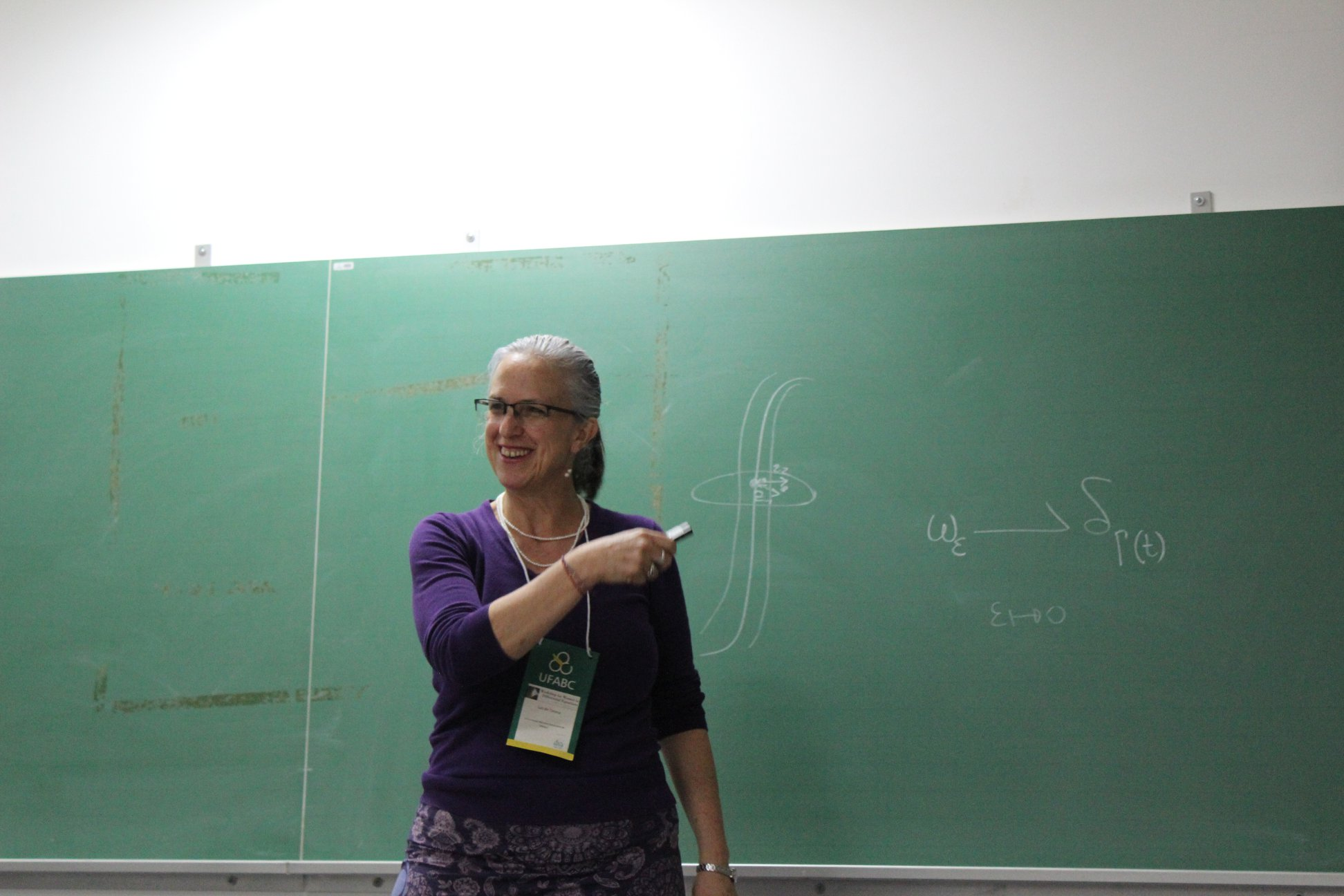
Image of Luz de Teresa

María de la Luz (Lucero) Jimena de Teresa de Oteyza (born 1965) is a Mexican and Spanish mathematician specializing in the control theory of parabolic partial differential equations. She is a researcher in the Institute of Mathematics at the National Autonomous University of Mexico (UNAM), and a former president of the Mexican Mathematical Society.

== Education and career ==
De Teresa was born in Mexico City on 14 June 1965; and is a citizen of both Mexico and Spain. Her father was a physicist who encouraged her to do what made her happiest; she decided that not having integrals in her life would be a horrible absence.

She became an undergraduate at UNAM, graduating in 1990. Next, she studied applied mathematics at the Complutense University of Madrid, completing her PhD in 1995. Her dissertation, Control de algunas ecuaciones de la Física-Matemática: Ecuación de ondas, del calor y sistema de la termoelasticidad, was supervised by Enrique Zuazua.

She has been a researcher in the Institute of Mathematics at UNAM since 1995, and was president of the Mexican Mathematical Society for the 2018–2020 term. In 2020 she was named to the governing board of UNAM's university council.

== Recognition ==
De Teresa was elected to the Mexican Academy of Sciences in 2011. She was named an honorary member of the Royal Spanish Mathematical Society in 2018.

UNAM gave her their Sor Juana Inés de la Cruz Recognition in 2009.
