= Chengdu University of Traditional Chinese Medicine =

Provincial public medical university in Chengdu, China

- 成都中医药大学
- Type: Public research university
- Established: 1956; 70 years ago
- Academic staff: 871
- Students: 10,000
- Location: Chengdu, Sichuan, China
- Campus: Urban, 130 hectares
- Website: cdutcm.edu.cn

The Chengdu University of Traditional Chinese Medicine (CDUTCM; 成都中医药大学) is a provincial public medical university in Chengdu, Sichuan, China. It is affiliated with the Province of Sichuan, and co-sponsored by the provincial government, the Ministry of Education, and the National Administration of Traditional Chinese Medicine. The university is part of the Double First-Class Construction. Founded 1956, the university is one of the four earliest traditional Chinese medicine colleges established after the Chinese Civil War.

== History ==
Founded as the Chengdu Traditional Chinese Medicine College (成都中医学院) in 1956, it is one of the four earliest TCM tertiary institutions in the People's Republic of China. In 1995, the college was granted university status, changing its name to the Chengdu University of Traditional Chinese Medicine.

== Courses ==
The university has a graduate to higher education levels that from undergraduate to graduate, up to master and doctorate and teaching many sort of TCM courses. It also has Chinese medicine and the engineering, management, literature and agricultural courses, etc. It has short-term as well as long-term course including for foreigners and local students and some students have also go to further study after and some in Shanghai after graduation of University. The campus region has area of 130 hectares and over 50 majors and it is quite large enough. It major focus is to have the high quality of TCM skilled students including local and global wide, the specialties covering the clinical practice of Chinese medicine (herbs and traditional medicines), Chinese pharmacy for pharmacist students, pharmaceutical engineering, nursing, management, marketing, Tibetan medicine and so on. It is a state TCM base for education-research-medicine. Even though graduated from TCM school it has their specific specialist like example Pharmacist.

== Degrees ==
The University is one of the first universities which can confer master's/doctor's degrees and have postdoctoral workshops. It can confer 16 doctoral degrees, 27 master's degrees and 2 postdoctoral workshops (Chinese pharmacy, Chinese medicine). CDUTCM has three national key courses (Chinese pharmacy, TCM Ear-Nose-Throat, Acupuncture & Moxibustion and Tuina) and 14 provincial key courses. It has 3 key laboratory of the state Education Ministry, 7 grade three laboratories of the state TCM Administration, 5 provincial key laboratories and 16 provincial key courses.

== Teachers and students ==
The courses are mainly given by Chinese language for local students, even though CDUTCM is a university and large campus but inside the main university there are separated with characterized by TCM traditional teaching with 12 sub-colleges and student with related specialized major study in specific colleges rather than altogether in one place. For faculty for students volume there are over 500 professors and associate professors, 88 tutors for doctors and 283 tutors for masters. CDUTCM holds around 10,000 students (over 1300 students for doctoral and master's degrees), including more than 100 students from Hong Kong, Macao, Taiwan and foreign countries. But abroad foreigners are usually required the appropriate Visas to study and stay in China that for more information about to get supporting documents may required to obtain visas can ask from the foreign related office of the school And every year over 200 students come for the short-term training programs.

== Research ==
CDUTCM can be able to cope for doing research related with TCM and has made contributions to the society. With 6 Research Institutes and 37 Research Institutional offices, it also has the states' GCP center, Chinese Pharmaceutical Screening and Evaluation Center and ADR Monitoring Center. In recent years, the university has taken the state key project of the Tenth Five-Year Plan, "973 program" and "863 program", key programs of the National Fund of Nature and Science. Various prizes have been awarded. Cultural Museum of TCM and Museum of Chinese Drug Specimens are with abundant collection.

== Hospital ==
It has CDUTCM teaching Hospital and has been one of the first-class hospitals of China, it has been used traditional way and medicines it is also located in Chengdu City. Students got the opportunities for can go to study in real field as in TCM Hospital.

== International ==
Since there are TCM clinics and herb pharmacies are using in countries there are also operating with Chinese medicine in world, some country inviting skilled workers of TCM since Chinese TCM has been good benefits for society, some people have like to use since there less side effect that using natural herbs, such as plants, roots or so on. Some countries like Australia also has TCM school for proper study and to do for some The international education exchange, cooperation are top in the western China. Since 1993, CDUTCM began to enroll the students from Hong Kong, Macao and Taiwan, and foreign masters and doctors. The information-exchange relationship has been established between CDUTCM and 176 institutions in 31 countries and areas such as WTO, American National Library and American Royal Association. It has made exchange and cooperated with universities, R&D centers, and medical institutes in America, Germany, Sweden, Israel, Japan, Korea and Singapore etc.

== Administrative school list ==
List of schools and Department under University of TCM:

- School of Acupuncture & Moxibustion
- School of Administration
- School of Basic Medicine
- School of Clinical Medicine
- School of Continuous Education
- School of International Education
- School of Nursing
- School of Chinese Pharmacy
- School of Vocational & Technical Education
- School of Cultural and Social Sciences
- School of E' mei
- Department of Physical Education

== Student life ==
There are hostels that students can stay in. The hostel is off-campus and student hostels are separated apart. There are female-only hostels that permitted entry for male. Hostel accommodation and the campus are in downtown Chengdu; transportation is convenient. Some of the student hostels have facilities as two telephone lines inside the rooms, 4 room mates shared with level stories building; it had been separated from senior to junior students depend on the grades.

The school has been teaching Chinese traditional medicine. It has short-term courses, undergraduate, graduate, postgraduate and doctorate level as well. Normally for local students graduate level courses are conducted for four years. For local students there are many specialized of courses such as Pharmacist.

They have facilities for teaching foreign students with international courses. The courses are included with theory of Acupuncture, Chinese Herbs and Formula and so on.
