= Pío del Río Hortega =

Spanish neuroscientist who discovered Microglia (1882–1945)

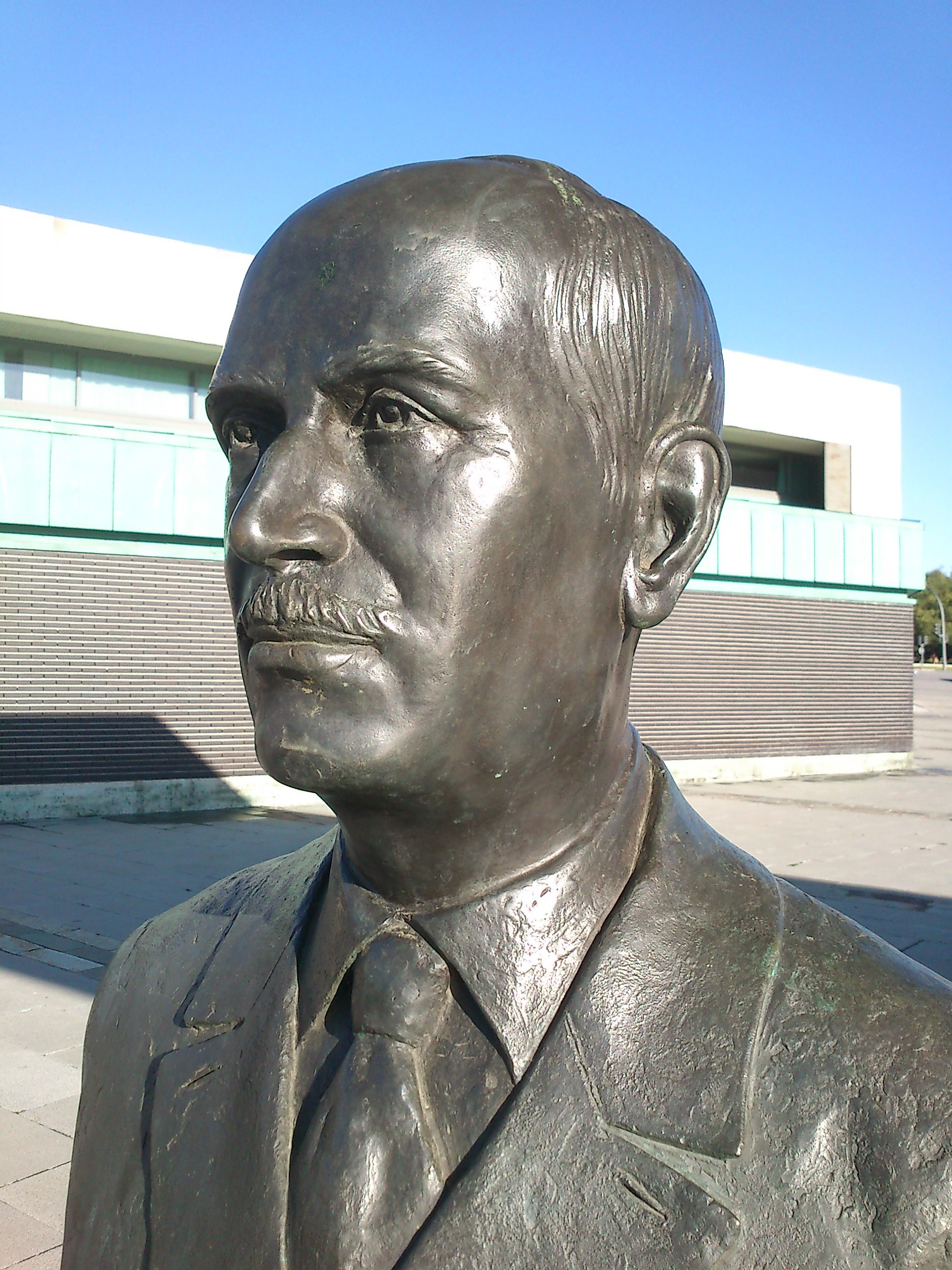
- Statue of Pío del Río Hortega outside Valladolid Science Museum
- Born: 5 May 1882; Portillo, Spain
- Died: 1 June 1945 (aged 63); Buenos Aires, Argentina
- Known for: discovering microglia

Pío del Río Hortega (1882 – 1945) was a Spanish neuroscientist who first distinguished microglia from the other brain cell types.

== Biography ==
Río Hortega was born in Portillo, Valladolid on 5 May 1882. He studied locally and qualified to practice medicine in 1905. He obtained his doctorate at the University of Madrid by researching the pathology of brain tumours. In 1913, he was funded to study research histology in France and Germany but the outbreak of war between them forced him to return to Spain.

He joined the laboratory of Nicolás Achúcarro, who was trained by the histologist Santiago Ramón y Cajal, and later briefly worked with Wilder Penfield. Ramón y Cajal was influential for his work on neurons, while Penfield and Río Hortega helped explain oligodendroglia, Río Hortega was the first to distinguish microglia, which are the immune cells of the brain, from astrocytes and oligdodendrocytes. He also introduced the term microglia.

He identified microglia as separate from other glial cells by staining tissue with ammonium silver carbonate. His method of staining allowed him to distinguish between astrocytes, microglia, and oligodendrocytes. At the time, Ramón y Cajal had described astrocytes, neurons, and the "third element" of the nervous system. In a series of four papers published in 1919, Río Hortega demonstrated that the "third element" consisted of two different cell types: microglia and oligodendrocytes. Río Hortega also made several important conclusion about microglial function in these papers, notably that they originate in the mesoderm, that they transform into different phenotypes during pathological conditions, and that they are likely phagocytic. He published the work on oligodendroglia in 1921, which both he and Penfield are now credited with. However, it was Río Hortega who named the cells.

As with many early neuroanatomical findings, his discoveries were subject to controversy, including a scientific and personal conflict with Ramón y Cajal. By 1931 del Río Hortega was leading Spain's cancer institute, but he left the country when the civil war broke out in 1936.

War spreading across Europe found him in Paris at the Pitié-Salpêtrière Hospital before he went to the University of Oxford to work with the British neurosurgeon Hugh Cairns. The bombing of Britain by Germany in World War II drove him on to Argentina in August 1940. His move was funded by the Spanish Cultural Institute, who continued to support him as he created his own laboratory in 1942. In Buenos Aires he developed a fruitful scientific school with former disciples who worked with him in Europe (Moisés Polak, Washington Buño) and new ones, including chronologically the last one, Amanda Pellegrino de Iraldi. Río Hortega died in Buenos Aires on 1 June 1945 from a malignant neoplasm.

In 1986, the Spanish government awarded him, posthumously, with the Grand Cross of the Civil Order of Health.
