= Acta Physiologica =

- Discipline: Physiology
- Language: English
- Edited by: Pontus B. Persson

Publication details
- History: 1889–present
- Publisher: Wiley-Blackwell
- Frequency: Monthly
- Impact factor: 7.523 (2021)

Standard abbreviations
- ISO 4: Acta Physiol.
- NLM: Acta Physiol (Oxf)

Indexing
- CODEN: APCHC4
- ISSN: 1748-1708 (print); 1748-1716 (web)
- LCCN: 2006243105
- OCLC no.: 724078240

Links
- Journal homepage; Online access; Online archive

Acta Physiologica is a monthly peer-reviewed scientific journal that is published by Wiley-Blackwell on behalf of the Scandinavian Physiological Society. According to the Journal Citation Reports, it has a 2021 impact factor of 7.523. It is the official journal of the Federation of European Physiological Societies.

The journal was established in 1889 as the Skandinavisches Archiv für Physiologie and renamed to Acta Physiologica Scandinavica in 1940, before obtaining its current name in 2006.
