= Cell Calcium =

- Discipline: Cell biology
- Language: English
- Edited by: S Muallem, A Verkhratsky

Publication details
- History: 1980–present
- Publisher: Elsevier
- Frequency: Monthly
- Impact factor: 4.0 (2022)

Standard abbreviations
- ISO 4: Cell Calcium

Indexing
- CODEN: CECADV
- ISSN: 0143-4160
- OCLC no.: 237360462

Links
- Journal homepage; Online archive

Cell Calcium is a monthly peer-reviewed scientific journal published by Elsevier that covers the field of cell biology and focuses mainly on calcium signalling and metabolism in living organisms.

== Abstracting and indexing ==
The journal is abstracted and indexed in:

- BIOSIS
- Cambridge Scientific Abstracts
- Current Awareness in Biological Sciences
- Current Contents/Life Sciences
- EMBASE
- MEDLINE/PubMed
- Science Citation Index
- Scopus

According to the Journal Citation Reports, Cell Calcium has a 2022 impact factor of 4.0.
