= Achucarro Basque Center for Neuroscience =

Spanish research center

Coordinates: 43.3320°N 2.9677°W

Achucarro Basque Center for Neuroscience Fundazioa
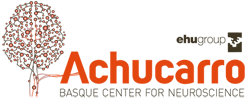
- Formation: 2012
- Type: Research Center
- Location: Leioa
- Products: R&D
- General Secretary: Achucarro Basque Center for Neuroscience
- Scientific Director: Prof. Dr. Javier E. Stern, Dr. José Luis Zugaza Gurruchaga
- Parent organization: Basque Government; Ikerbasque; UPV/EHU
- Website: www.achucarro.org

The Achucarro Basque Center for Neuroscience is a BERC (Basque Excellence Research Center) research center devoted to neuroscience and created by Ikerbasque – the Basque Foundation for Science and the University of the Basque Country (UPV/EHU) in mid-2012. The center is named after Nicolas Achucarro (Bilbao, 1880–1918), the first internationally recognized Basque neuroscientist.

The center is located at the Science Park of UPV/EHU, within the campus of University of the Basque Country, in Leioa, Spain.

The research focus of the center is the study of neuronal-glial biology in normal and pathological brain, which is the base for training students and disseminate the acquired knowledge to the Society, so well-being of people and sustainable social development is fostered.

== History ==
The center was founded in mid-2012 as part of the Basque Government's strategic initiative to establish specialized, high-level research centers (BERCs) to enhance the region's scientific output and regional presence in Europe.

== Research Program ==
The research program spans neuron-glia interactions, neurodegenerative and autoimmune diseases, and brain development and aging. It maintains a strong focus on translational medicine, aiming to convert fundamental biological discoveries into practical diagnostic tools and therapeutic interventions.

== Core Platforms and Facilities ==
The center maintains several state-of-the-art core scientific units to support internal and external biomedical research:

- Advanced Optical Imaging Platform: Equipped with confocal and super-resolution microscopy (STED) microscopes, two-photon fluorescence microscopies for live-tissue and in vivo imaging, high-content screening (HCSP), and Structured Illumination. This platform is part of a node in the network Euro-BioImaging
- Cell Analytics Platform: Mainly FACS facilities.
- Biomarkers: Includes ELISA, Multiplex and Single Molecule Array technologies.
- Basque Biomodel Platform for Human Research (BBioH): Operated in partnership with the Instituto Biofisika, this platform develops patient-derived induced pluripotent stem cells (iPSC) into 2D cultures and 3D brain organoids to model neurological conditions in human biological backgrounds.
- Electrophysiology and High-Density MEA: Microelectrode Array (MEA) systems capable of high-resolution electrophysiological recording and stimulation of neural networks in real time.
