= Basque Center for Applied Mathematics =

Spanish research institute

Coordinates: 43.267128°N 2.930281°W

- Motto: Matematika mugaz bestalde Mathematics beyond frontiers
- Established: September 1, 2008
- Director: Jose Antonio Lozano
- Location: Bilbao, Basque Country, Spain
- Website: www.bcamath.org

The Basque Center of Applied Mathematics (BCAM) is a research center on applied mathematics, created with the support of the Basque Government and the University of the Basque Country. The BCAM headquarters are in Alda. Mazarredo, 14 in Bilbao, the capital of the province of Biscay in the Basque Country of northern Spain.

== Background ==
In January 2007, the Department of Education, Universities and Research of the Basque Government set up Ikerbasque, the Basque Foundation for Science, which was charged with three objectives: the attraction and recovery of front-rank, consolidated researchers; the creation of new research centers with standards of excellence, and social outreach for science. The creation and current activity of BCAM – the Basque Center for Applied Mathematics - fall within the framework of the second of these objectives.

In early 2008, Ikerbasque commissioned Enrique Zuazua to carry out a prospective study on the viability of setting up a center for mathematical research in the Basque Country. In March, 2008, the Ikerbasque Board of Trustees decided to go ahead with the creation of such a center as part of the BERC program (Basque Excellent Research Centres), later to become known as BCAM – Basque Center for Applied Mathematics. At the same time, the first international call for submissions for posts of director, managers and scientists was made.

The center is located in the province of Biscay, given the extensive industrial fabric that the region has had traditionally as well as its current development of R+D+i activities. BCAM was officially created as a non-profit Association on September 1, 2008, and backed by the following three institutions: Ikerbasque, the University of the Basque Country (UPV-EHU), Innobasque, the Basque Foundation for Innovation and The Biscay Government.

== Scientific Directors of BCAM ==
- Jose Antonio Lozano - from January 10, 2019
- Luis Vega González - May 8, 2013 to January 9, 2019
- Tomás Chacón, October 1, 2012 to March 10, 2013
- Enrique Zuazua, September 1, 2008 to July 31, 2012

== Research lines ==
The scientific program is structured in 5 research areas:

- Computational mathematics
- Mathematical modelling
- Mathematical physics
- Partial differential equations, control and numerics
- Data science and artificial intelligence

== See also ==
- Basque Government
- Ikerbasque
- University of the Basque Country
