= Ikerbasque =

Spanish research organization

Ikerbasque - Basque Foundation for Science
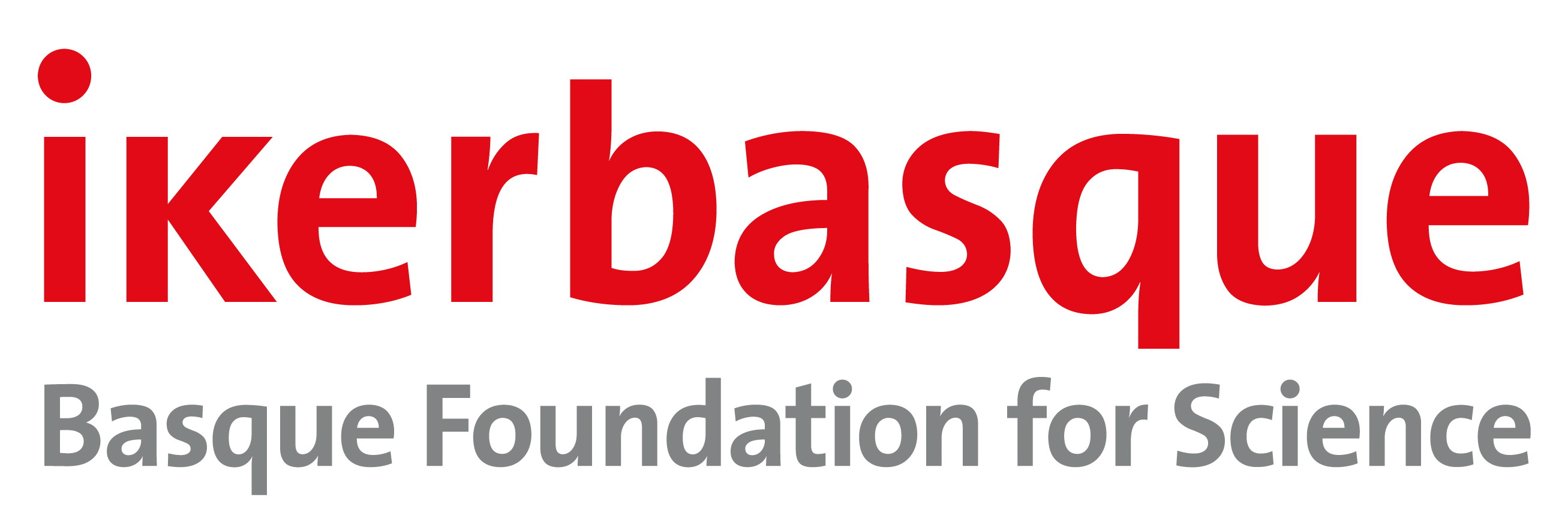
- Formation: 2007
- Type: Research Organization
- Location: Bilbao
- Products: R&D
- Scientific Director: Fernando Cossío
- Website: www.ikerbasque.net

Ikerbasque, the Basque Foundation for Science, is a foundation promoted by the Basque Government in 2007 to contribute to the development of scientific research in the Basque Country by attracting researchers of excellence and consolidating careers, as well as actions to boost research. Its first scientific director was Mª Carmen Gallastegui, a professor of economics at the University of the Basque Country. In July 2009, she was replaced by Professor Fernando Cossío. Ikerbasque celebrated its 10th anniversary in 2017.

== Researchers ==
Since its launch, Ikerbasque has had several recruitment programs for researchers with different profiles. All those researchers are expected to develop their work assigned to centers in the Basque science and technology network. At the end of 2024, 402 researchers carried out their activity in Ikerbasque, among them 201 professors, 89 associates, and 112 fellows. Further growth of the Ikerbasque personnel to up to 450 by the year 2028 is planned by the Basque government.

=== Research fellows ===
Ikerbasque Research Fellows are young researchers who have 3–10 years of postdoctoral experience, international experience and whose CV have been assessed as outstanding by the Evaluation Committee of Ikerbasque. They are assigned to Basque universities and research centres for a five-year period. This program opens annual calls since its creation in 2012, with a maximum of 25 positions each year.

=== Research associates ===
The Research Associate program was born in 2017 as an instrument to stabilize the Research Fellows offering them permanent positions. In its presentation, the Basque Government indicated that "it was born specially designed so that the Research Fellows, who have proven their worth as researchers in Basque centers for five years, can give continuity to Basque research in the longer term."

=== Research professors ===
The profile of Ikerbasque Research Professors is that of an experienced researcher capable of leading new research groups, or fostering existing groups, and opening up novel state of the art research topics within the Basque Science community.

In 2010, European Commission awarded Ikerbasque with a Marie Curie action - Cofund program fellowship of 5 million Euros, for co-funding this program.

== Basque Excellence Research Centers ==
Ikerbasque assisted the Basque Government in launching the BERC Basque Excellence Research Centers: 3 of them have been created by the foundation (BC3 - Basque Center for Climate Change, BCAM - Basque Center for Applied Mathematics and BCBL - Basque Center for Cognition, Brain and Language), 3 were already existing centers which were given the BERC category and funding (Donostia International Physics Center, Material Physics Center and Biophysics Unit) and the last 3 were created in cooperation with the University of the Basque Country (UPV/EHU) from leading research groups within the University (Achucarro Basque Center for Neuroscience, Polymat - Basque Center for Macromolecular Design and BCMaterials.

== Support activities for basque science institutions ==
Ikerbasque collaborates with diverse scientific institutions of the Basque Country (universities, BERCs, CICs, Technological Centers, Biosanitary Research Institutes) with initiatives that seek a global improvement of Basque science. These include:

=== Ikerboost – Basque Science & Technology Observatory ===
Ikerbasque launched Ikerboost, the Observatory of Science and Technology, in 2010. This includes a battery of socio-economic and bibliometric indicators, both at the regional and state or international levels, which allows a characterization of the Basque scientific community and its quantitative and qualitative comparison with those of other countries. Ikerboost publishes annually the Report on Science in Euskadi.

=== Euraxess Service Centre ===
The Service Centre of the Euraxess network in the Basque Country is managed by Ikerbasque and it offers personalized assistance to the highly qualified professionals (researcher, technologist, etc.) who are willing to work in Euskadi and organizations that planning to hire these professionals.

=== Science.eus – Map of Basque Science ===
In January 2016, Ikerbasque launched the website www.science.eus, which gathers information on all the scientific infrastructures, research job offers and research groups in the Basque Country.

=== BasQ ===
The IBM-Euskadi Quantum Computational Center, the research facility built around the quantum computer IBM Quantum System Two purchased by the Basque government is managed by Ikerbasque. It will be housed in the Ikerbasque Building that is being completed in San Sebastián.
