= First Lady of Ukraine =

Spouse of the President of Ukraine

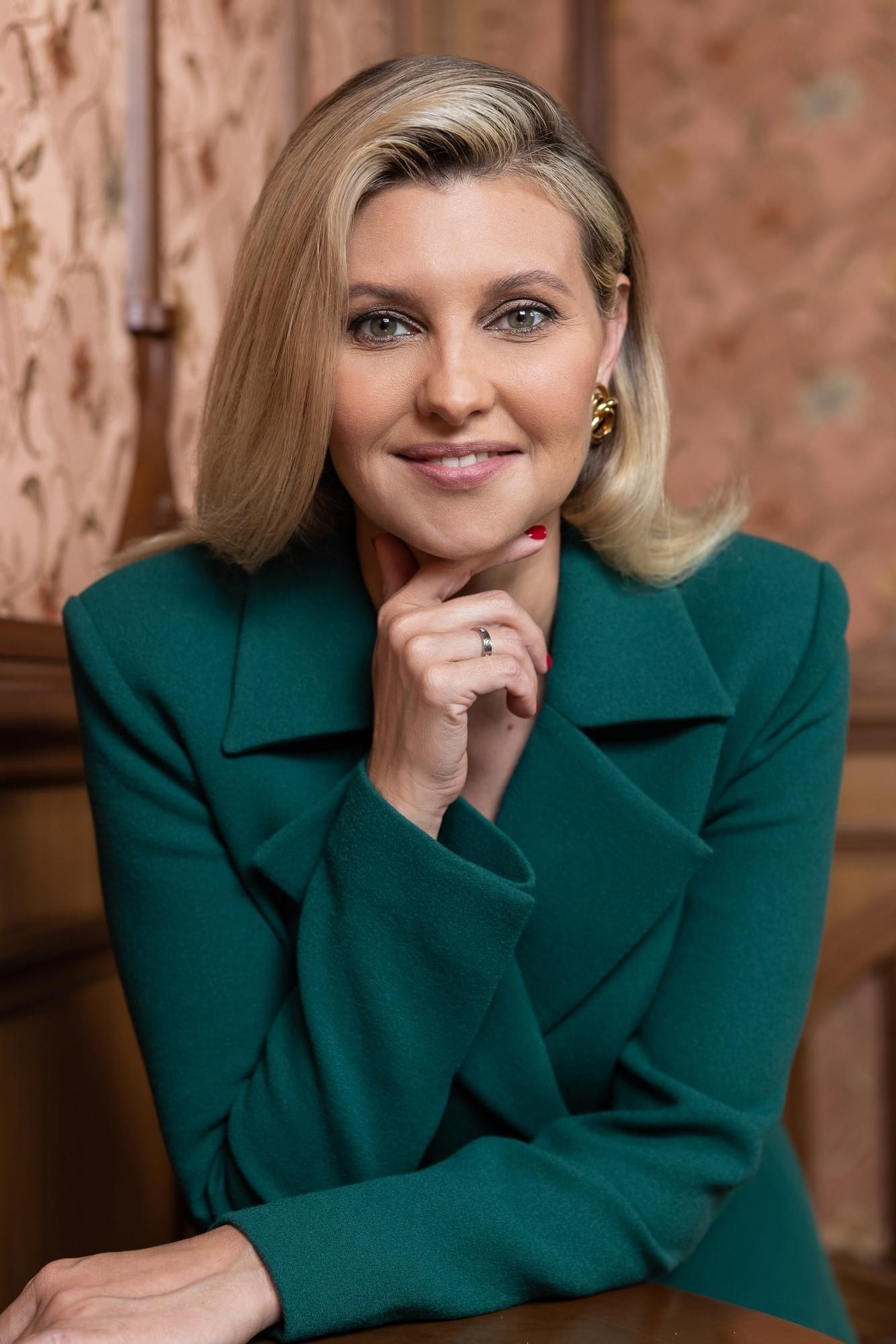
- Current; Olena Zelenska since 20 May 2019
- Inaugural holder: Antonina Kravchuk
- Formation: 24 August 1991

First Lady of Ukraine (Ukrainian: перша пані України, romanized: persha pani Ukrainy or перша леді України, persha ledi Ukrainy) is the unofficial title attributed to the wife of the president of Ukraine.

== List of first ladies of Ukraine ==
#	Image	First Lady	Education	Birth	Marriage	President (Husband, unless noted)	Tenure began	Age at tenure start	Tenure ended	Length of retirement	Death	Current age
1		Antonina Kravchuk (née Mishura)	Candidate of Economical Sciences; Kyiv State University	November 3, 1935	1957	Leonid Kravchuk	1991	56 years, 32 days	1994	11,738 days		90 years, 308 days
2		Lyudmyla Kuchma (née Talalayeva)	Mechanical engineer Votkinsk Machine-building College	June 19, 1940	1967	Leonid Kuchma	1994	54 years, 30 days	2005	7,897 days		86 years, 80 days
3		Kateryna Yushchenko (née Chumachenko)	Master of Business Administration; University of Chicago	September 1, 1961	1998	Viktor Yushchenko	2005	43 years, 144 days	2010	6,038 days		65 years, 6 days
4		Lyudmyla Yanukovych (née Nastenko)	Civil engineer Makiivka Civil Engineering Institute	October 9, 1949	November 1972	Viktor Yanukovych	2010	60 years, 139 days	2014	4,580 days		76 years, 333 days
–		Hanna Turchynova (née Beliba)	Candidate of Pedagogical Sciences; Kyiv Linguistic University	April 1, 1970		Oleksandr Turchynov	2014	43 years, 327 days	2014	4,475 days		56 years, 159 days
5		Maryna Poroshenko (née Perevedentseva)	Candidate of Medical Sciences; Bogomolets National Medical University	February 1, 1962	1984	Petro Poroshenko	2014	52 years, 126 days	2019	2,667 days		64 years, 218 days
6		Olena Zelenska (née Kiyashko)	Architecture; Kryvyi Rih National University	February 6, 1978	2003	Volodymyr Zelenskyy	2019	41 years, 93 days				48 years, 203 days

== List of wives of leaders of the Ukrainian People's Republic ==
#	Image	First Lady	Education	Birth	Marriage	President (Husband, unless noted)	Tenure began	Age at tenure start	Tenure ended	Length of retirement	Death	Lifespan
1		Maria-Ivanna Hrushevska (née Wojakiwska)	Lemberg Lyceum	November 8, 1868	May 1896	Mykhailo Hrushevsky	1917	48 years, 119 days	1918	11,101 days	September 19, 1948	79 years, 316 days
2		Oleksandra Skoropadska (née Durnovo)		May 23, 1878	11 January 1898	Pavlo Skoropadsky	1918	39 years, 341 days	1918	12,434 days	December 29, 1952	74 years, 220 days
3		Rozalia Vynnychenko (née Lifshitz)	Medical doctor University of Sorbonne	July 26, 1886	28 March 1911	Volodymyr Vynnychenko	1918	32 years, 141 days	1919	14,603 days	February 6, 1959	72 years, 195 days
4		Olha Petliura (née Bilska)	Pryluky Gymnasium	December 23, 1885	1910	Symon Petliura	1919	33 years, 52 days	1926	12,235 days	November 23, 1959	73 years, 335 days
5		Mariya Livytska (née Tkachenko)	Kyiv Gymnasium	April 9, 1879	1901	Andriy Livytskyi	1926	47 years, 46 days	1954	6,420 days	August 16, 1971	92 years, 129 days
6		Melaniya Vytvytska (née Stelmakh)	Drohobych Gymnasium	December 31, 1887	1910	Stepan Vytvytskyi	1954	66 years, 18 days	1963	0 days	September 28, 1963	75 years, 271 days
7		Helga Livytska (née Weinzierl)				Mykola Livytskyi	1967		1989			
8		Yaroslava Plaviuk (née Boyko)	Ukrainian Gymnasium in Berchtesgaden	March 24, 1926	June 1948	Mykola Plaviuk	1989		1992		March 4, 2023	

== See also ==
- Kyiv Summit of First Ladies and Gentlemen
