= Government of the Ukrainian People's Republic in exile =

1921–1992 government in exile

Government of the Ukrainian People's Republic in exile Уряд Української Народної Республіки у вигнанні (Ukrainian)
- 1921–1992
- Flag Coat of arms
- Anthem: "Ukraine has not yet perished"
- Status: Government-in-exile
- Capital: Kiev
- Capital-in-exile: Warsaw (first); Philadelphia (last)
- Common languages: Ukrainian
- Demonym: Ukrainian
- President
  - 1948–1954 (first): Andriy Livytskyi
  - 1989–1992 (last): Mykola Plaviuk
- History
  - Established: March 18, 1921
  - Dissolved: August 22, 1992
| Preceded by | Succeeded by |
| Ukrainian People's Republic | Ukraine |
- Today part of: Ukraine

Government of the Ukrainian People's Republic in exile, or State Center of the Ukrainian People's Republic (SC of UPR) was a government in exile formed following the collapse of the Ukrainian People's Republic in 1920. It was initially located in Poland before relocating to France and later Germany during the Second World War. It finally relocated to Philadelphia in 1976, where it would remain until its dissolution. In 1992, the government recognized the newly independent Ukrainian government as the successor to the Ukrainian People's Republic, and formally relinquished its powers to the new Ukrainian authorities.

After the May Coup (Poland) in 1926 in the Second Polish Republic, Józef Piłsudski recognized the UNR government in exile, in a covert attempt to destabilize the Soviet Union, and in retaliation for Soviet support of the Communist Party of Western Ukraine.

== Legal basis ==
The legal basis of the UPR government was set in the laws "On the temporary Supreme Administration and Legislation in the UPR" and "On the State People's Council", approved on November 12, 1920, by the Directorate of Ukraine. These acts, based on the laws of the Labor Congress of Ukraine, transferred legislative functions and control over the government of the Ukrainian People's Republic to the State People's Council.

However, prior to the convening of this council, its functions were assigned to the Council of People's Ministers, and the head of the Directorate acted as the head of state, approving laws, treaties, appointments, representation before foreign states. The head of the Directorate, in case of impossibility to perform duties, was represented by the board, and in case of impossibility to convene it – by the chairman of the Council of People's Ministers.

== Structure ==
- Executive bodies – President (in 1921–1944, Chief Otaman), the Council of Ministers (1921–1992)
- Legislative bodies – Republic's Council, Ukrainian National Council

== Leaders ==
=== Presidents ===
1. Symon Vasyliovych Petliura — 1921–1926 (Chief Otaman)
2. Andrii Mykolaiovych Livytskyi — 1926–1954 (until 1944, chief otaman)
3. Stepan Porfyrovych Vytvytskyi — 1954–1965
4. Spyrydon Mykytovych Dovhal – 1966–1967 в.о.
5. Mykola Andriiovych Livytskyi — 1967–1989
6. Mykola Vasyliovych Plaviuk — 1989–1992

=== Chairmen of the Council of People's Ministers of UPR ===
1. Andrii Mykolaiovych Livytskyi — 1920–1921
2. Pylyp Kalenkovych Pylypchuk – 1921–1922
3. Andrii Mykolaiovych Livytskyi — 1922–1926
4. Viacheslav Kostiantynovych Prokopovych — 1926–1939
5. Oleksandr Yakovych Shulhyn — 1939–1940
6. Viacheslav Kostiantynovych Prokopovych — 1940–1942
7. Andrii Ivanovych Yakovliv – 1944–1945
8. Kostiantyn Kostiantynovych Pankivskyi – 1945–1948
9. Isaak Prokhorovych Mazepa — 1948–1952
10. Stepan Ivanovych Baran – 1952–1953
11. Spyrydon Mykytovych Dovhal – 1954
12. Symon Vasyliovych Sozontiv – 1954–1957
13. Mykola Andriiovych Livytskyi — 1957–1966
14. Spyrydon Mykytovych Dovhal – 1966–1967
15. Atanas Ivanovych Figol – 1967–1969
16. Spyrydon Mykytovych Dovhal – 1969–1972
17. Vasyl Lukynovych Fedoronchuk – 1972–1974
18. Teofil Leontii – 1974–1976
19. Ivan Ivanovych Kedryn-Rudnytskyi – 1976–1978
20. Teofil Leontii – 1978–1980
21. Yaroslav-Bohdan Antonovych Rudnytskyi — 1980–1989
22. Ivan Matviiovych Samiilenko – 1989–1992

During World War II, the UPR government was not active, but Andrii Livytsky was signing documents as the head of the Directorate. After the war, the government was reformed, and included activists from various parties in Western Ukraine and the organized public from sub-Soviet Ukraine.

=== Chairmen of the Ukrainian National Council ===
1. Ivan Bahrianyi — 1948–1952 (chairman)
2. Ivan Bahrianyi — 1952–1954 (acting chairman)
3. Osyp Boidunyk – 1954–1955 (acting chairman)
4. Yevhen Oleksiiovych Glovinskyi – 1955–1957 (acting chairman)
5. Ivan Bahrianyi — 1957–1961 (chairman)
6. Osyp Boidunyk – 1961–1965 (chairman)
7. Spyrydon Mykytovych Dovhal – 1966–1967 (acting chairman)
8. Yakiv Makovetskyi – 1967–1971
9. Petro Belei – 1971–1972 (acting chairman)
10. Spyrydon Mykytovych Dovhal – 1972–1975 (chairman)
11. Ivan Ivanovych Kedryn-Rudnytskyi – 1976–1978 (acting chairman)
12. Volodymyr Ivanovych Biliaiv – 1979–1984
13. Pavlo Danylovych Lymarenko – 1984–1989
14. Mykhailo Hryhorovych Voskobiinyk – 1989–1992

Locations of the governing bodies of the State Center of the Ukrainian People's Republic: Tarnow (Poland) – 1921–23; Paris (France) – 1924–26; Warsaw (Poland) – 1926–39; France – 1940–44; Weimar (Nazi Germany), Bad Kissingen (American occupation zone in Germany) – 1944–46; Munich (West Germany) – 1946–76; Philadelphia (US) – 1976–92.

== Activity ==
=== Restoration of the UPR structures during World War II ===
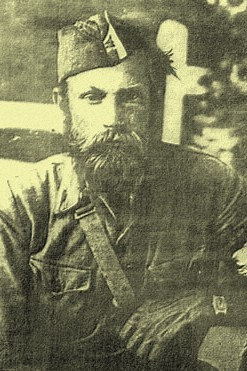
Taras Bulba-Borovets

After the beginning of the World War II Taras Bulba-Borovets, with the support of the President of the Ukrainian People's Republic in exile Andrii Livytskyi, crossed the German-Soviet border and started organizing UPA military units subordinate to the UPR Government. After the Reich's attack on the USSR, together with Belarusian partisans, he captured Olevsk and proclaimed the Olevsk Republic. Due to the demands of the Germans to obey their orders, the civil administration in Olevsk was disbanded, and guerrilla warfare activated. Bulba-Borovets strongly opposed Bandera's attempts to proclaim a Ukrainian state in 1941, as he believed that "starting from January 22, 1918, it's not needed to proclaim a Ukrainian sovereign state, as it has already been proclaimed once and its legitimate government has not stopped its political activities as an exile government of an occupied country. The statehood could only be restored".

=== Domestic policy ===
The UPR government in exile acted through various ministries and institutions. On the domestic side, due to the opposition of some parties, it failed to create a coordinating political center, and the state center was often treated as a separate party ("uenerivtsi"). The difficulties in the UPR environment arose with the signing of the Treaty of Warsaw (the case of Galicia), and orientation towards the Republic of Poland (members of the government considered it "orientation towards Western Europe"). The UPR government was also criticized for its attitude towards the struggle of Ukrainians under the Polish Republic, Kingdom of Romania and the Czechoslovak Republic as it, to use the opponents' term tolerated the "occupation" and limited itself to meeting the "needs of the Ukrainian minority." The domestic department was led by Oleksandr Salikovskyi and Oleksandr Lototskyi, and after the Second World War – by Mykhailo Vetukhiv (1945–1948). The exile government of the UPR was supported by the Ukrainian Revolutionary Democratic Party (former "esefy" – members of the Socialists-Federalists Party), which formed the majority of the government. The Ukrainian Social Democratic Labour Party was not a member of the UPR government, but was loyal to it. On the other hand, the Ukrainian Socialist-Revolutionary Party under the leadership of Mykyta Shapoval was strongly against the exile government – together with the members of the Farmers-Statesmen Union and Ukrainian nationalists (OUN). The position of the political groups in Galicia, primarily the UNDO (Ukrainian National Democratic Alliance), has evolved from objection (because of the Treaty of Warsaw) to a kind of tolerance and even cooperation in specific political and civic actions.

=== Foreign policy ===
On November 20, 1929, US government issued a bill providing for appointment of a diplomatic representative to the Ukrainian People's Republic (S. 2177).

A. Nikovskyi and later O. Shulhyn (till 1946) carried out the foreign activities. Initially, there were Ukrainian diplomatic missions in certain countries: K. Matsievych – in Romania, A. Livytskyi – in Poland, M. Slovinskyi – in Czechoslovakia, R. Smal-Stotskyi – in Germany, M. Vasylko – in Switzerland, V. Murskyi – in Turkey, O. Shulhyn – in France, and so on. The latter lasted the longest, others were eliminated in the early 1920s. O. Shulhyn, as the head of the UPR mission in Paris, and later as the Minister of Foreign Affairs, kept in touch with the League of Nations, protesting against the Bolshevik occupation of Ukraine, the actions of Soviet diplomacy, and famine in Ukraine. The State Center of the Ukrainian People's Republic prepared a draft of the recognition of the UPR government in exile, this project was proposed to the highest legislative body of the United States by several senators led by D. Kopelyan. He maintained close contacts with the pan-European movement, advocating for the idea of Ukraine's belonging to the European community. He condemned the policy of Germany, France, Italy and Great Britain in dealing with the Carpathian Ukraine's issue. In September 1939 in Paris, the UPR government led by V. Prokopovych declared its solidarity with Western democracies, condemning the totalitarian regimes in Nazi Germany and the USSR. Some international activities were carried out by the UPR government through the Ukrainian Society for the League of Nations. A separate area of work of the UPR government was the organization of cooperation between the "sub-Soviet" peoples – Prometheism, in which not only Ukrainians, but also representatives of the Caucasus, Don, Kuban, Crimea, Turkestan regions participated.

On September 1, 1939, the UPR government in exile, led by V. Prokopovych, declared war on Nazi Germany.

=== Army ===
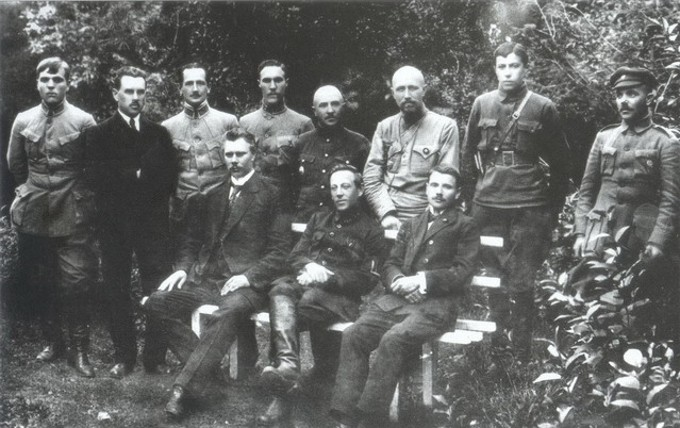
Members of the Directory of the Ukrainian National Republic and the UNR Army

The UPR government paid special attention to the military department (headed by Generals M. Bezruchko, V. Petriv, V. Salskyi, M. Omelyanovych-Pavlenko), managing the training of military personnel and the organization of former combatants. A number of UPR sergeants were working as contract officers in the Polish army. To popularize the military affairs, the UPR government organized the Ukrainian Historical Military Society, was publishing the "Tabor", "For Statehood" magazines, and other literature.In 1941–1944 the Ukrainian People's Revolutionary Army (Polissian Sich) was officially a subject to the Government of the Ukrainian People's Republic in exile.

=== Culture ===
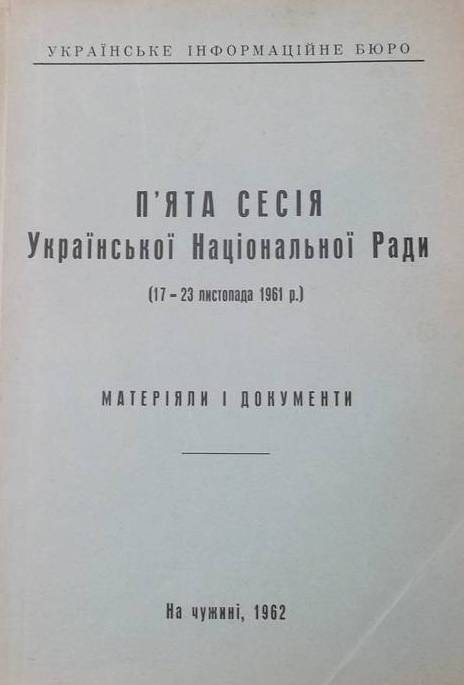
Fifth session, cover

The public and cultural activities of the UPR's exile government were organized through civic formations that existed in different countries: the Union of Ukrainian Emigration Organizations in France, the Ukrainian Central Committee in Poland, the Public Assistance Committee of Ukrainian Emigrants in Romania, the Ukrainian Association in Czechoslovakia and others, whose work was coordinated by the General Emigration Council (headed by O. Shulhyn). In Paris in 1926, the S. Petliura Library was founded, where the archival materials of the Ukrainian People's Republic were stored.

In 1938, the UPR government founded the Ukrainian Mohyla-Mazepa Academy of Sciences.

Through the activities of the UPR government, the Polish government established the Ukrainian Scientific Institute in Warsaw.

The unofficial body of the UPR government was the weekly magazine "Trident" published in Paris (1925–1940), revived in 1959. After each session of the UPR Council, the Ukrainian Information Bureau published materials and documents.

== Members of the government ==
Government of the UPR in exile, elected at the tenth session of the Ukrainian People's Republic in 1989:

- Head of the Government— Ivan Samiylenko.
- Deputy Head of the Government — Mykhailo Pap.
- Deputy Head of the Government and Head of the Legal Affairs Department— Mykola Sukhoverskyi.
- State Secretary — Nataliia Pazunyak, co-opted, sworn in later.
- Head of Finance Department — Kost Lutsenko.
- Head of the Regional Affairs Department — Mykhailo Herets.
- Head of the Foreign Affairs Department — Volodymyr Zhyla.
- Head of the Press and Information Department — Volodymyr Marko.
- Head of the Internal Affairs Department — Yurii Ikhtiarov.
- Head of the Special Assignments Department — Mykola Lypovetskyi, Stepan Vorokh, Vsevolod Salenko.
- Archive Director — Yurii Salskyi.
- Head of the State Tribunal — Yaroslav Rudnytskyi.

== Reformation and disbandment ==
External videos
- The UPR government is resigning – 22.08.1992

In exile, the State Center existed without a legislative body – only for a short period of time in 1921 the Republic's Council, a representative body of the UPR consisting of party delegates, professional and cultural organizations, was established in Tarnów. After the World War II, the head of the Directorate A. Livytskyi decided to reorganize the government of the UPR. For this purpose, the Ukrainian National Council was established in 1947 as a pre-parliament of the State Center of the Ukrainian People's Republic in exile, which was to continue the ideological and legal traditions of the UPR since the interwar period.

An extraordinary session of the Ukrainian National Council on March 15, 1992, adopted a resolution "About handing over authority of the State Center of UNR in exile to the state power in Kiev and termination of work of the State Center of UNR in exile".

On August 22, 1992, Mykola Plavyuk, President of the Ukrainian People's Republic in exile, presented the diploma of the State Center of the UPR to Leonid Kravchuk, the President of Ukraine during a parliamentary session. This act was meant to portray that the Ukrainian independent state, proclaimed on August 24, 1991, was the successor to the Ukrainian People's Republic. According to Ukrainian law, Ukraine is the successor state of the Ukrainian SSR that was part of the Soviet Union.

== Documentary heritage ==
The documentary heritage of the Government of the Ukrainian People's Republic in exile is preserved in the funds of the Central State Archive of Foreign Ukrainika and the Central State Archive of Higher Authorities and Administration of Ukraine.
