= Helga Livytska =

Wife of the first Ukrainian president

- Гельга Лівицька

First Lady of Ukraine
- In role 1967–1989
- President: Mykola Livytskyi
- Preceded by: Melaniya Vytvytska
- Succeeded by: Yaroslava Plaviuk

Personal details
- Born: Helga Weinzierl Munich
- Spouse: Mykola Livytskyi
- Occupation: Former First Lady of Ukraine

Helga Livytska (Note: Ukrainian: Гельга Лівицька, romanized: Helha Livytska) (née Weinzierl) (Note: Ukrainian: Вайнцирль, romanized: Vaintsyrl) is a Ukrainian public figure, the wife of the first Ukrainian president. She is active in the Ukrainian women's movement. She was engaged in charitable activities, in particular, supported the Ukrainian Museum in New York at 203 Second Avenue. She participated in the work of the State Center of the Ukrainian People's Republic in the exile, in 1989, at the inauguration of the President of the Government of the Ukrainian People's Republic in exile Mykola Plaviuk. She was the wife of the president of the Ukrainian People's Republic in the exile of Mykola Livytskyi.

== Notes ==
Honorary titles
Preceded by Melaniya Vytvytska	First Lady of Ukraine; 1967–1989	Succeeded by Yaroslava Plaviuk
