= Plaviuk =

Plaviuk (Ukrainian: Плав'юк) is a Ukrainian surname. Notable people with the surname include:

- Mykola Plaviuk (1925–2012), Ukrainian social and political activist
- Yaroslava Plaviuk (1926–2023), Ukrainian activist
