= List of heads of state of Ukraine =

This is a list of heads of state of Ukraine since 1917.

== Ukrainian People's Republic (1917–1921) ==
The Ukrainian People's Republic was formed after the Russian Revolution of 1917, and lasted until the Peace of Riga between Poland and Soviet Russia in March 1921. The state leadership position title varied and, despite a rather widespread misconception, none of them had an official Presidential title.

The Directorate of Ukraine was a provisional council of the UNR formed after Skoropadskyi's Hetmanate fell apart. On 22 January 1919, the Act of Unification of the Ukrainian People's Republic and the West Ukrainian People's Republic was passed. The text of the universal was made by the members of the Directory.

No.	Picture	Name (Birth–Death)	Began office	Left office	Party	Title(s)
—		Volodymyr Pavlovych Naumenko (1852–1919)	17 (4) March 1917	28 (15) March 1917	Constitutional Democratic Party	Chairman of the Central Rada
1		Mykhailo Hrushevsky (1866–1934)	28 (15) March 1917	29 April 1918	Ukrainian Socialist-Revolutionary Party	Chairman of the Central Rada
2		Volodymyr Vynnychenko (1880–1951)	14 December 1918	11 February 1919	Ukrainian Social Democratic Labour Party	Chairman of the Directory
3		Symon Petliura (1879–1926)	11 February 1919	10 November 1920	Independent	Chairman of the Directory

=== In exile (1921–1992) ===
In Munich during 1948–1992, and in New York City in 1992:

No.	Picture	Name (Birth–Death)	Began office	Left office	Party
1		Andriy Livytskyi (1879–1954)	16 July 1948	17 January 1954	Ukrainian Social Democratic Labour Party
2		Stepan Vytvytskyi (1884–1965)	17 January 1954	9 October 1965	Independent
3		Mykola Livytskyi (1907–1989)	9 October 1965	8 December 1989	Independent
4		Mykola Plaviuk (1925–2012)	8 December 1989	22 August 1992	Organization of Ukrainian Nationalists

== Ukrainian State (1918) ==
Following a coup inspirated by the German military authorities on 29 April 1918, an authoritarian provisional state was proclaimed by a former Imperial Russian General Pavlo Skoropadskyi, who proclaimed himself Hetman of Ukraine. This regime was deposed in December same year, when the Ukrainian People's Republic was reinstalled, now led by the Directory.

Hetman	Reign	Dynasty
Pavlo Skoropadskyi (1873–1945)	29 April 1918 – 14 December 1918	Skoropadsky

== West Ukrainian People's Republic (1918–1919) ==
The government of the Western Ukrainian People's Republic, which was proclaimed on 19 October 1918, united with the Ukrainian People's Republic on 22 January 1919, although this was mostly a symbolic act because the western Ukrainians retained their own Ukrainian Galician Army and government structure. After the Polish-Ukrainian War, Poland took over most of territory of the West Ukrainian People's Republic by July 1919.

No.	Picture	Name (Birth–Death)	Began office	Left office	Party	Title(s)
1		Yevhen Petrushevych (1863–1940)	18 October 1918	22 January 1919	Ukrainian National Democratic Party	President

== Ukrainian Soviet Socialist Republic (1917–1991) ==
The nomenclature for the head of state position was changing. At first it was called the Chairman of the Central Executive Committee, then it was called the Uprising Nine (Povstanburo) which was later reorganized into the Central Military-Revolutionary Committee (sort of revkom). In mid July 1918 there were some biases about the idea of the Ukrainian SSR, but with the help of more nationally inclined bolsheviks such as Skrypnyk, Zatonsky, and others the government of the Soviet Ukraine was preserved. After the defeat of Directoria the head of state was again called as the chairman of the Central Executive Committee. Ukraine was incorporated into the Soviet Union on 30 December 1922. Since 1938 the position began to be called as the chairman of the Presidium of Verkhovna Rada which was abolished in 1990. From 1990 to 1991 it was simply the head of the Verkhovna Rada until the introduction of the office of the President of Ukrainian SSR.

No.	Picture	Name (Birth–Death)	Began office	Left office	Party	Title(s)
1		Yukhym Medvedev (1886–1936)	24 December 1917	18 March 1918	Ukrainian Social Democratic Labour Party	Chairman of the Central Executive Committee
2		Volodymyr Zatonsky (1888–1938)	18 March 1918	18 April 1918	Russian Social Democratic Labour Party (Bolshevik)	Chairman of the Central Executive Committee
—		Ukrainian Bureau For Directing the Partisan Resistance Against the German Occupiers	18 April 1918	28 November 1918	Communist Party of Ukraine (Bolshevik)	Chairman of the Central Executive Committee
—		Georgy Pyatakov (1890–1937)	28 November 1918	29 January 1919	Communist Party of Ukraine (Bolshevik)	Chairman of the Central Executive Committee
—		Christian Rakovsky (1873–1941)	29 January 1919	10 March 1919	Communist Party of Ukraine (Bolshevik)	Chairman of the Central Executive Committee
3		Grigory Petrovsky (1878–1958)	10 March 1919	10 March 1938	Communist Party of Ukraine (Bolshevik)	Chairman of the Central Executive Committee
—		Leonid Korniyets (1901–1967)	10 March 1938	25 July 1938	Communist Party of Ukraine (Bolshevik)	Chairman of the Central Executive Committee
—		Mykhailo Burmystenko (1902–1941)	25 July 1938	27 July 1938	Communist Party of Ukraine (Bolshevik)	Chairman of the Presidium of the Supreme Soviet
4		Leonid Korniyets (1901–1969)	27 July 1938	28 July 1939	Communist Party of Ukraine (Bolshevik)	Chairman of the Presidium of the Supreme Soviet
4		Leonid Korniyets (1901–1969)	28 July 1939	14 January 1954	Communist Party of Ukraine (Bolshevik)	Chairman of the Presidium of the Supreme Soviet
5		Demyan Korotchenko (1894–1969)	14 January 1954	7 April 1969	Communist Party of Ukraine	Chairman of the Presidium of the Supreme Soviet
6		Oleksandr Liashko (1915–2002)	7 April 1969	8 June 1972	Communist Party of Ukraine	Chairman of the Presidium of the Supreme Soviet
7		Ivan Hrushetsky (1904–1982)	8 June 1972	24 June 1976	Communist Party of Ukraine	Chairman of the Presidium of the Supreme Soviet
8		Oleksiy Vatchenko (1914–1984)	24 June 1976	22 November 1984	Communist Party of Ukraine	Chairman of the Presidium of the Supreme Soviet
9		Valentyna Shevchenko (1935–2020)	22 November 1984	4 June 1990	Communist Party of Ukraine	Chairman of the Presidium of the Supreme Soviet
10		Vladimir Ivashko (1932–1994)	4 June 1990	9 July 1990	Communist Party of Ukraine	Chairman of the Presidium of the Supreme Soviet
—		Ivan Plyushch (1941–2014)	9 July 1990	23 July 1990	Communist Party of Ukraine	Chairman of the Presidium of the Supreme Soviet
11		Leonid Kravchuk (1934–2022)	23 July 1990	24 August 1991	Communist Party of Ukraine	Chairman of the Presidium of the Supreme Soviet

== Ukraine (1991–present) ==
On 5 July 1991, the Supreme Soviet of the Ukrainian SSR passed a law establishing the post of the "President of the Ukrainian SSR". The title was changed to "President of Ukraine" upon the proclamation of independence on 24 August 1991, simultaneously making then-Speaker of the parliament Leonid Kravchuk acting president.

The first presidential election in Ukraine was held on 1 December 1991. On 22 August 1992, the last President of the Ukrainian People's Republic in exile Mykolva Plaviuk transferred his authorities to the first post-Soviet president Leonid Kravchuk.

Non-partisan, without support or independent People's Union "Our Ukraine" Party of Regions All-Ukrainian Union "Fatherland" Petro Poroshenko Bloc "Solidarity" Servant of the People

№	President	Took office	Left office	Elected	Party
—	Leonid Kravchuk (1934–2022)	24 August 1991	5 December 1991	— (Note: Acting President as then-Chairman of the Verkhovna Rada between the proclamation of independence and the first presidential election.)	Independent
1	Leonid Kravchuk (1934–2022)	5 December 1991	19 July 1994	1991	Independent
2	Leonid Kuchma (Born 1938)	19 July 1994	23 January 2005	1994; 1999	Independent
3	Viktor Yushchenko (Born 1954)	23 January 2005	25 February 2010	2004	Our Ukraine
4	Viktor Yanukovych (Born 1950)	25 February 2010	22 February 2014	2010	Party of Regions
—	Oleksandr Turchynov (Born 1964)	23 February 2014	7 June 2014	— (Note: Acting President after the 2014 Revolution of Dignity and the subsequent flight of Viktor Yanukovych to Russia.)	Fatherland
5	Petro Poroshenko (Born 1965)	7 June 2014	20 May 2019	2014	Petro Porshenko Bloc
6	Volodymyr Zelenskyy (Born 1978)	20 May 2019	Incumbent	2019	Servant of the People
