= Livytskyi =

Livytskyi is a surname. Notable people with the surname include:

- Andriy Livytskyi (1879–1954), Ukrainian politician, diplomat, statesman, and lawyer
- Mykola Livytskyi (1907–1989), Ukrainian politician and journalist
