= Melaniya Vytvytska =

Wife of the first Ukrainian president

- Меланія Витвицька
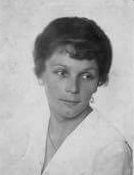

First Lady of Ukraine
- In role 1954–1963
- President: Stepan Vytvytskyi
- Preceded by: Mariya Livytska
- Succeeded by: Helga Livytska

Personal details
- Born: Melaniya Stelmah; December 31, 1887 Drohobych, Austria-Hungary (now Ukraine)
- Died: September 28, 1963 (aged 75) New Jersey, U.S.
- Spouse: Stepan Vytvytskyi (m. 1910)
- Children: Ihor Vytvitskyi
- Occupation: Former First Lady of Ukraine

Melaniya Vytvytska (Note: Ukrainian: Меланія Витвицька, romanized: Melaniia Vytvytska) (December 31, 1887 – September 9, 1963, née Stelmah) (Note: Ukrainian: Стельмах, romanized: Stelmakh) was a Ukrainian public figure. The wife of the second President of the Ukrainian People's Republic in exile, Stepan Vytvytskyi, she was also an activist of the Ukrainian women's movement.

In 1910 she married Stepan Vytvytskyi. In 1912, they had a son, Ihor Vytvitskyi.

From July 16, 1935, she was a member of the social assistance committee of the magistrate staff of the city of Drohobych.

On October 11, 1936, she was elected a member of the secretary of the Ukrainian National Society for the Protection of Children and guardianship of young people.

She worked in the Committee on Assistance to Political Prisoners, who were often sentenced by Polish courts for a long time, and in the Committee on Assistance to Military Persons with Disabilities.

She died on September 28, 1963, after a long and serious illness.

On October 2, 1963, she was buried at the Evergreen Cemetery in New Jersey.

== Notes ==
Honorary titles
Preceded by Mariya Livytska	First Lady of Ukraine; 1954-1965	Succeeded by Helga Livytska
