= Yaroslava Plaviuk =

Ukrainian First Lady (1989–1992)

Yaroslava Plaviuk Ярослава Плав'юк

First Lady of Ukraine in the exile
- In role 1989–1992
- President: Mykola Plaviuk
- Preceded by: Helga Livytska
- Succeeded by: Antonina Kravchuk

Personal details
- Born: Yaroslava Boyko; 24 March 1926 Bila, Ternopol Voivodeship, Poland (now Ukraine)
- Died: 4 March 2023 (aged 96) Burlington, Ontario, Canada
- Spouse: Mykola Plaviuk
- Children: Orest, Nestor, Ulana, Oksana
- Occupation: Former First Lady of Ukraine

Yaroslava Plaviuk (née Boyko; 24 March 1926 – 4 March 2023) was a figure in the Ukrainian women's movement. She was an honorary member of the Ukrainian Women's Society named after Olena Teliha and a member of the Olha Basarab Women's Society. As the wife of Mykola Plaviuk, she held the role of First Lady of the Ukrainian People's Republic in exile from 1989 to 1992.

== Biography ==
Yaroslava Boyko was born in Bila, Ternopil Raion, Ukraine on 24 March 1926. By 1945 she was in the camp for Displaced Persons in United States Allied-occupied Germany Karlsfeld near Munich. In 1946 she graduated from the Ukrainian Gymnasium in Berchtesgaden, Bavaria, Germany.

In 1948 she married Mykola Plaviuk in Munich; they had two sons, Orest and Nestor, and two daughters, Ulyan and Oksana. In 1949 they moved to Montreal in Canada.

Her husband took up several political roles, including the head of the Organization of Ukrainian Nationalists, the Secretary-General and the President of the Ukrainian World Congress. In 1989 he became the last president of the Ukrainian People's Republic in the exile, making Yaroslava the First Lady of Ukraine.

== Cultural work ==
Yaroslava Plaviuk made a significant contribution to the formation of self-consciousness in order to support the national idea of Ukrainians abroad and at home, and to preserve the cultural heritage of Ukraine. She was one of the organizers of nominal scholarships for Ukrainian students and orphans from the Montreal Department of the Public Service of Ukrainian Canadians "Help Ukraine", where she cared for the victims of the Chernobyl disaster.

She patronized the Ivanovo district organization of the Olena Teliha Women's Society. She was involved in arranging sponsorship for the annual Ukrainian literary and artistic competition for the best performance of Olena Telihi's works "To continue to go one way", held among the students of Ukraine.

In 2013, Yaroslava Plaviuk transferred to the Central State CinePhotoPhono Archive of Ukraine (now Central State Audiovisual and Electronic Archive) materials related to the musical heritage of composer Bohdan Vesolovsky and singer Antin Derbysh.

On 21 January 2018, Yaroslava Plaviuk spoke at events commemorating the 100th anniversary of the Ukrainian People's Republic in Toronto. She called to preserve the independence of Ukraine and to build a strong democratic European country.

== Awards ==
- Certificate of honor of Mayor of Kyiv
- Order of the Archangel Michael of the Ukrainian Orthodox Church – Kyiv Patriarchate

Honorary titles
Preceded by Helga Livytska	First Lady of Ukraine; 1989–1991	Succeeded by Antonina Kravchuk
