= Liudmyla Kuchma =

First Lady of Ukraine from 1994 to 2005

- Людмила Кучма
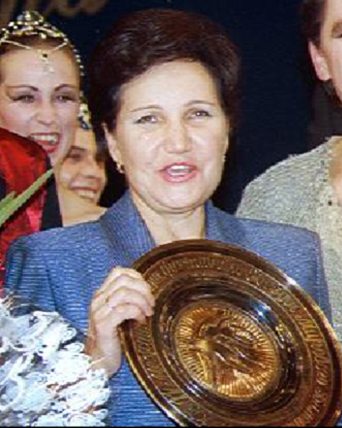
- Kuchma in 2000

First Lady of Ukraine
- In office 19 July 1994 – 23 January 2005
- President: Leonid Kuchma
- Preceded by: Antonina Kravchuk
- Succeeded by: Kateryna Yushchenko

Personal details
- Born: Lyudmila Nikolayevna Talalayeva; 19 June 1940 (age 86) Votkinsk, Udmurt ASSR, Russian SFSR, Soviet Union (now Udmurtia, Russia)
- Spouse: Leonid Kuchma (m. 1967)
- Relations: Gennady Fyodorovich Tumanov (stepfather; 1918–1989)
- Children: Olena Pinchuk
- Occupation: Former design engineer
- Awards: Order of the Lithuanian Grand Duke Gediminas; Order of Princess Olga First Class

Liudmyla Mykolaivna Kuchma (Note: Ukrainian: Людмила Миколаївна Кучма; Russian: Людмила Николаевна Кучма, romanized: Lyudmila Nikolayevna Kuchma) (née Talalaieva; (Note: Ukrainian: Талалаєва; Russian: Талалаева, romanized: Talalayeva) born 19 June 1940) is a Ukrainian former design engineer, who served as First Lady of Ukraine from 1994 to 2005 as the wife of President Leonid Kuchma.

== Early life and education ==
Liudmyla Kuchma was born in Udmurtia, and studied at a music school located in the house-museum of Pyotr Tchaikovsky. She graduated from mechanical college.

== Career ==
For thirty years, she worked as an engineer in the design office of a production association in Dnipropetrovsk.

== Personal life ==
In 1967, she married Leonid Kuchma, the president of Ukraine from 1994 to 2005. Her daughter Olena was born in 1970.

== Honors ==
In 1998, Kuchma was awarded the Order of the Lithuanian Grand Duke Gediminas. and Order of Princess Olga First Class (2010). Since 1996, she has been honorary president of the National Fund for Social Protection of Mother and Child.

Since 12 May 2004, she has been special ambassador of UNESCO to help young talents.

== Notes ==
Honorary titles
Preceded by Antonina Kravchuk	First Lady of Ukraine; 1994–2005	Succeeded by Kateryna Yushchenko
