= Mariya Livytska =

Wife of the first Ukrainian president

- Марія Лівицька
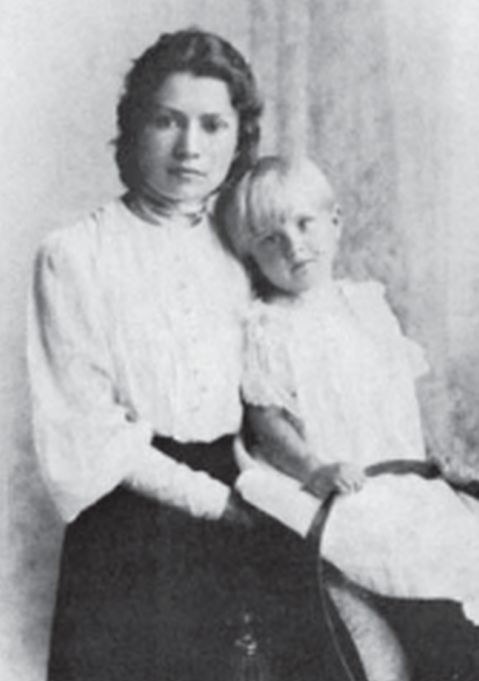
- Livytska in 1905

First Lady of Ukraine
- In role 1926–1954
- President: Andriy Livytskyi
- Preceded by: Olha Petliura
- Succeeded by: Melaniya Vytvytska

Personal details
- Born: Mariya Varpholomiivna Tkachenko; April 9, 1879 Zhmerynka, Russian Empire (now Zhmerynka, Ukraine)
- Died: August 16, 1971 (aged 92) Yonkers, New York City, N.Y, United States
- Spouse: Andriy Livytskyi
- Children: Mykola Livytskyi; Hatalia Livytska-Kholodna
- Occupation: Former First Lady of Ukraine

Mariya Varpholomiivna Livytska (née: Tkachenko; April 9, 1879 – August 16, 1971) was a Ukrainian writer, memoirist, and public figure. She was an Activist in the Ukrainian women's movement and headed the Union of Ukrainian Women in Poland. She was married to the president of the Ukrainian People's Republic in the exile of Andriy Livytskyi.

In 1897 she graduated from the Fundukleivka Women's Gymnasium in Kyiv and worked as a private teacher in and 1898–1899), while engaging in public and party activities. She became a member of the Revolutionary Ukrainian Party, the Ukrainian Social Democratic Labour Party, and became acquainted with its activists Mykola Mikhnovsky, Mykola Porsh. She was a member of the Kyiv student community, which included Dmytro Antonovych, Volodymyr Vynnychenko, Olexander Scoropis-Yoltukhivsky, Andriy Livytskyi, Liudmyla Starytska-Cherniakhivska, Maria Hrinchenko.

Maria Livytska took an active part in the activities of the Ukrainian Women's Society in the revolutionary events of 1905–1907. In 1920 she moved to Warsaw, where she headed the Union of Ukrainian emigrants in Poland. At the end of the Second World War, she moved to Germany and lived in Karlsruhe. In 1957 she moved to the United States.

She died on August 16, 1971, in Yonkers, New York.

== Publications ==
- "On the edge of two epochs" (1972).

Honorary titles
Preceded by Olha Petliura	First Lady of Ukraine; 1926-1954	Succeeded by Melaniya Vytvytska
