= Olha Petliura =

Wife of the first Ukrainian president

- Ольга Петлюра
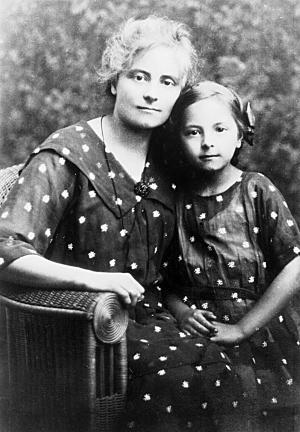

First Lady of Ukraine
- In role 1919–1926
- President: Symon Petliura
- Preceded by: Rozalia Vynnychenko
- Succeeded by: Mariya Livytska

Personal details
- Born: Olha Bilska; 23 December 1885; Malaya Devitsa, Poltava Governorate, Russian Empire (now Mala Divytsia, Chernihiv Oblast, Ukraine)
- Died: 23 November 1959 (aged 73); Paris, France
- Spouse: Symon Petliura
- Children: Lesia Petliura
- Occupation: Former First Lady of Ukraine

Olha Opanasivna Petliura (Note: Ukrainian: Ольга Опанасівна Петлюра) (née: Bilska; (Note: Ukrainian: Більска) 23 December 1885 – 23 November 1959) was a spouse of Ukrainian political leader Symon Petliura. She graduated from the Higher Courses for Women, Kyiv.

== Biography ==
Olha Bilska was born on December 23, 1885. In 1908, while she was in Kyiv, she met Symon Petliura. In 1910 they married and the couple took an active part in the life of the Ukrainian diaspora in Moscow, arranging concerts and literary evenings. In 1911 they had a daughter, Ukrainian poet, Lesia Petliura.

In 1924 they settled in Paris. Olha did embroidery work in order to ensure a decent living for her family.

On May 25, 1926 Symon was shot dead by Sholom Schwartzbard. This greatly affected Olga's health: she fell ill and began to lose her hearing. In addition, her daughter fell ill and continued to live with this illness until 1941, after which she died at the age of under 30 years. Subsequently, her remains were transferred to the cemetery of Montparnasse and buried in the neighborhood with the grave of her father, Symon.

Olga Petliura died on November 23, 1959. She was buried in a family grave at the Montparnasse cemetery near her husband and daughter.

== Notes ==
Honorary titles
| Preceded by Rozalia Vynnychenko | First Lady of Ukraine; 1919-1926 | Succeeded by Mariya Livytska |
