= Rusiv =

Rural locality in Ivano-Frankivsk Oblast, Ukraine

Rusiv Русів
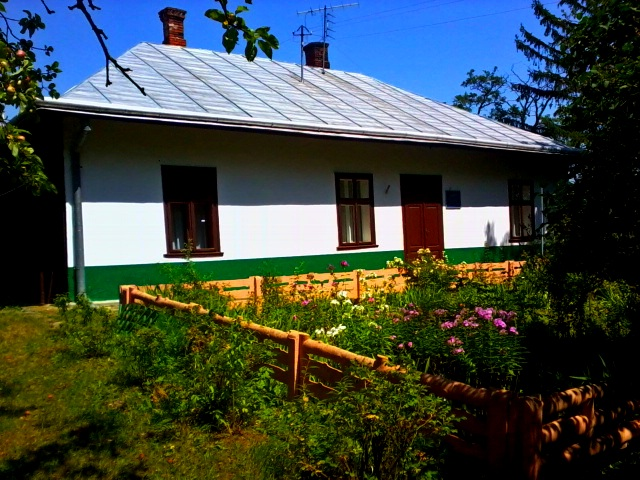
- House of Vasyl Stefanyk in Rusiv

- Location in Ivano-Frankivsk Oblast
- Coordinates: 48°30′55″N 25°31′30″E
- Country: Ukraine
- Oblast: Ivano-Frankivsk Oblast
- Raion: Kolomyia Raion
- Hromada: Sniatyn urban hromada
- Time zone: UTC+2 (EET)
  - Summer (DST): UTC+3 (EEST)
- Postal code: 78335

Rusiv (Ukrainian: Русів) is a village in the Sniatyn urban hromada of the Kolomyia Raion of Ivano-Frankivsk Oblast in Ukraine.

== History ==
The first written mention of the village was in 1443.

After the liquidation of the Sniatyn Raion on 19 July 2020, the village became part of the Kolomyia Raion.

== Religion ==
- Church of the Nativity of the Blessed Virgin Mary (1885, wooden).

== Notable residents ==
- Vasyl Stefanyk (1871–1936), Ukrainian modernist writer and political activist
- Mykola Plaviuk (1925–2012), Ukrainian social and political activist in emigration, who served as the last President of the Ukrainian People's Republic in exile

== Sources ==
- "Russów, wś, powiat śniatyński". Geographical Dictionary of the Kingdom of Poland (in Polish). p. 563.
