= President of Ukraine =

Head of state

- Президент України
- Presidential standard

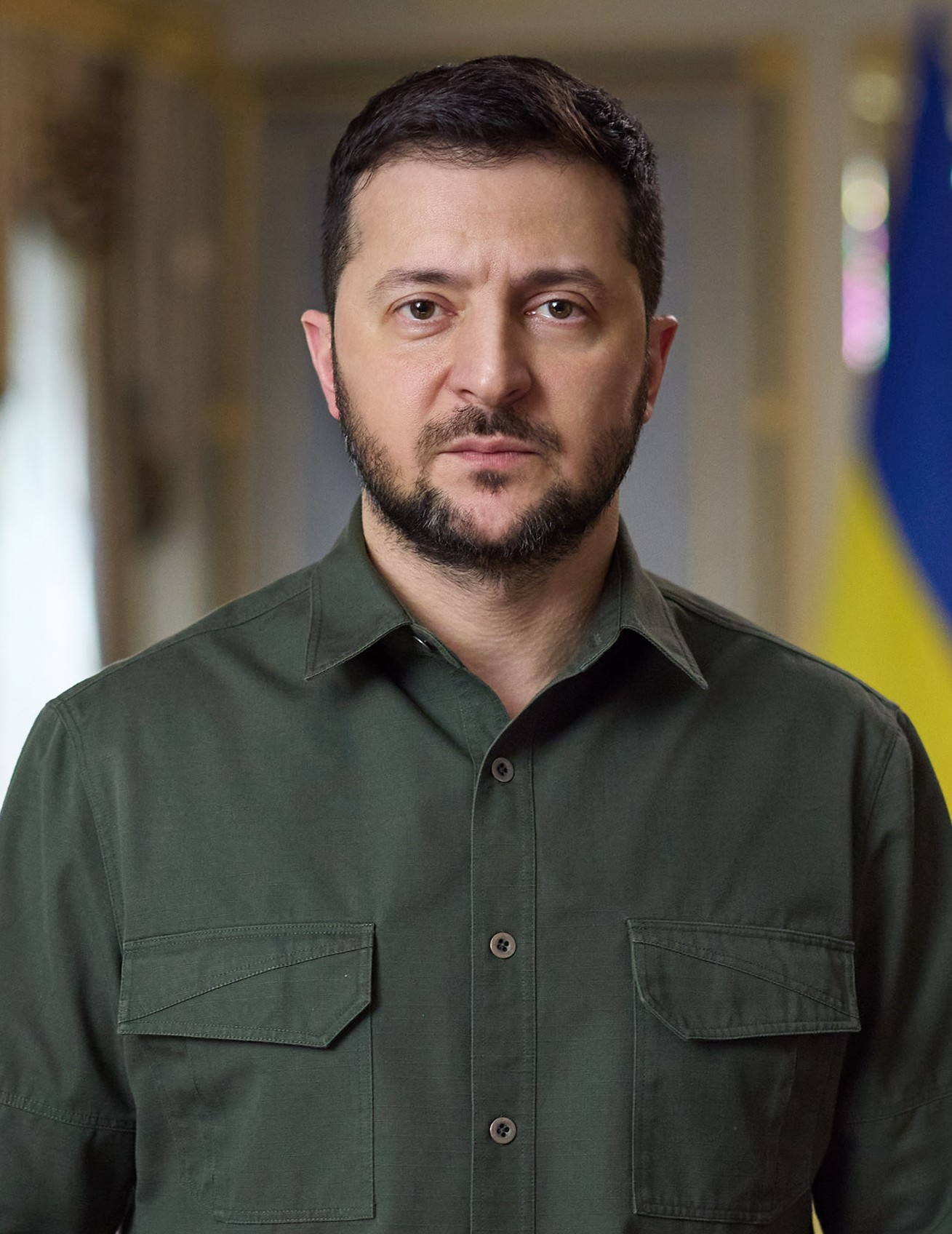
- Incumbent; Volodymyr Zelenskyy since 20 May 2019
- Executive branch of the Ukrainian Government; Office of the President
- Style: Mr. President (informal); Supreme Commander–in–Chief (military); His Excellency (diplomatic)
- Type: Executive president Head of state
- Member of: National Security and Defense Council
- Residence: Mariinskyi Palace (ceremonial); 13 other available for use
- Appointer: Popular vote
- Term length: Five years, renewable once consecutively
- Constituting instrument: Constitution of Ukraine (1996)
- Formation: 5 December 1991; 34 years ago^{[d]} (first established); 28 June 1996; 30 years ago (legal status defined)
- First holder: Leonid Kravchuk
- Deputy: Chairman of the Verkhovna Rada
- Salary: ₴336,000 or US$12,300 per annum est. (2016)
- Website: president.gov.ua/en

The president of Ukraine (Ukrainian: Президент України, romanized: Prezydent Ukrainy, pronounced [prezɪˈdɛnt ʊkrɐˈjinɪ]) is the head of state of Ukraine. The president represents the nation in international relations, administers the foreign political activity of the state, conducts negotiations and concludes international treaties. The president is directly elected by the citizens of Ukraine for a five-year term of office (whether the presidential election is early or scheduled), limited to two terms consecutively.

The president's official residence is the Mariinskyi Palace, located in the Pechersk district of the capital Kyiv. Other official residences include the House with Chimaeras and the House of the Weeping Widow, which are used for official visits by foreign representatives. The Office of the President of Ukraine, unofficially known as "Bankova" in reference to the street it is located on, serves as the presidential office, advising the president in the domestic, foreign and legal matters.

Since the office's establishment on 5 December 1991, there have been six presidents of Ukraine. Leonid Kravchuk was the inaugural president, serving three years from 1991 until his resignation in 1994. Leonid Kuchma was the only president to have served two consecutive terms in office. Viktor Yushchenko, Petro Poroshenko, and Viktor Yanukovych served one term, with the latter being replaced by acting president Oleksandr Turchynov, who then also served as Chairman of the Ukrainian Parliament, on 21 February 2014. Oleksandr Turchynov was the only acting president in Ukraine's modern history. The powers of an acting president are severely limited. On 18 June 2015, Yanukovych was officially deprived of the title of president of Ukraine. The Government of Ukraine utilizes a semi-presidential system in which the roles of the head of state and head of government are separate, thus the president of Ukraine is not the nation's head of government. The prime minister serves as the head of government, a role currently filled by Serhii Koretskyi, who took office on 16 July 2026. Ukraine is somewhat unusual in that while many countries use a similar system typically the role of one leader is relegated to being ceremonial, in Ukraine however both the prime minister and the president have great power and responsibility assigned to their roles. Because the president of Ukraine must approve the appointment of the prime minister, the post of president is generally thought of as the more powerful role.

The current president is Volodymyr Zelenskyy, who took the oath of office on 20 May 2019. Due to martial law, elections in the country have been suspended.

== Overview ==
The president is also the supreme commander-in-chief of the Ukrainian Armed Forces, and heads the National Security and Defence Council, which advises the president, co-ordinates and controls executive power in the sphere of national security and defence. According to the Constitution of Ukraine, the president is the guarantor of the state's sovereignty, territorial indivisibility, the observance of the Constitution of Ukraine and human and citizens' rights and freedoms.

As with the separation of powers, the president has checks on the authority of parliament and the judicial system. For instance, any law passed by the parliament can be vetoed by the president; however, parliament can override their veto with a 2/3 constitutional majority vote. The president has limited authority to disband the Verkhovna Rada (parliament), and nominates candidates for the minister of foreign affairs and the minister of defence in the Ukrainian Cabinet of Ministers. Six out of eighteen of the Constitutional Court judges are appointed by the president. Decisions of the president are subject to review by Ukraine's courts with the Constitutional Court having the sole authority and power to declare decrees of the president unconstitutional. While in office, the president enjoys the right of immunity.

Ukrainian presidents are frequently asked by individual citizens for help in solving their personal problems (sometimes successfully); in 2012, (then) president Yanukovych received about 10,000 to 12,000 letters from people every month.

== History ==
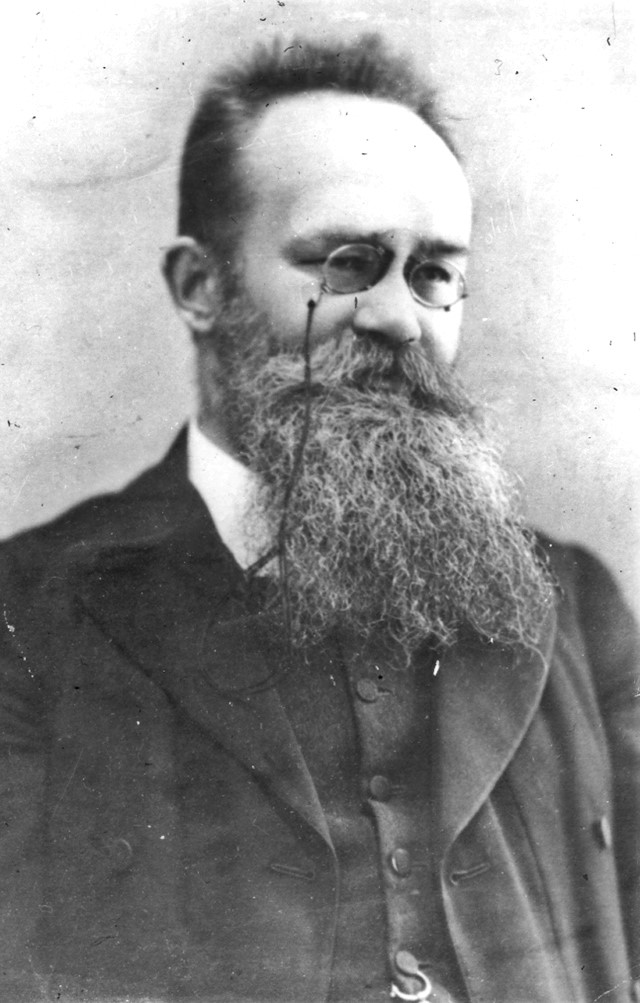
President of the Central Council Mykhailo Hrushevskyi (1917–18)

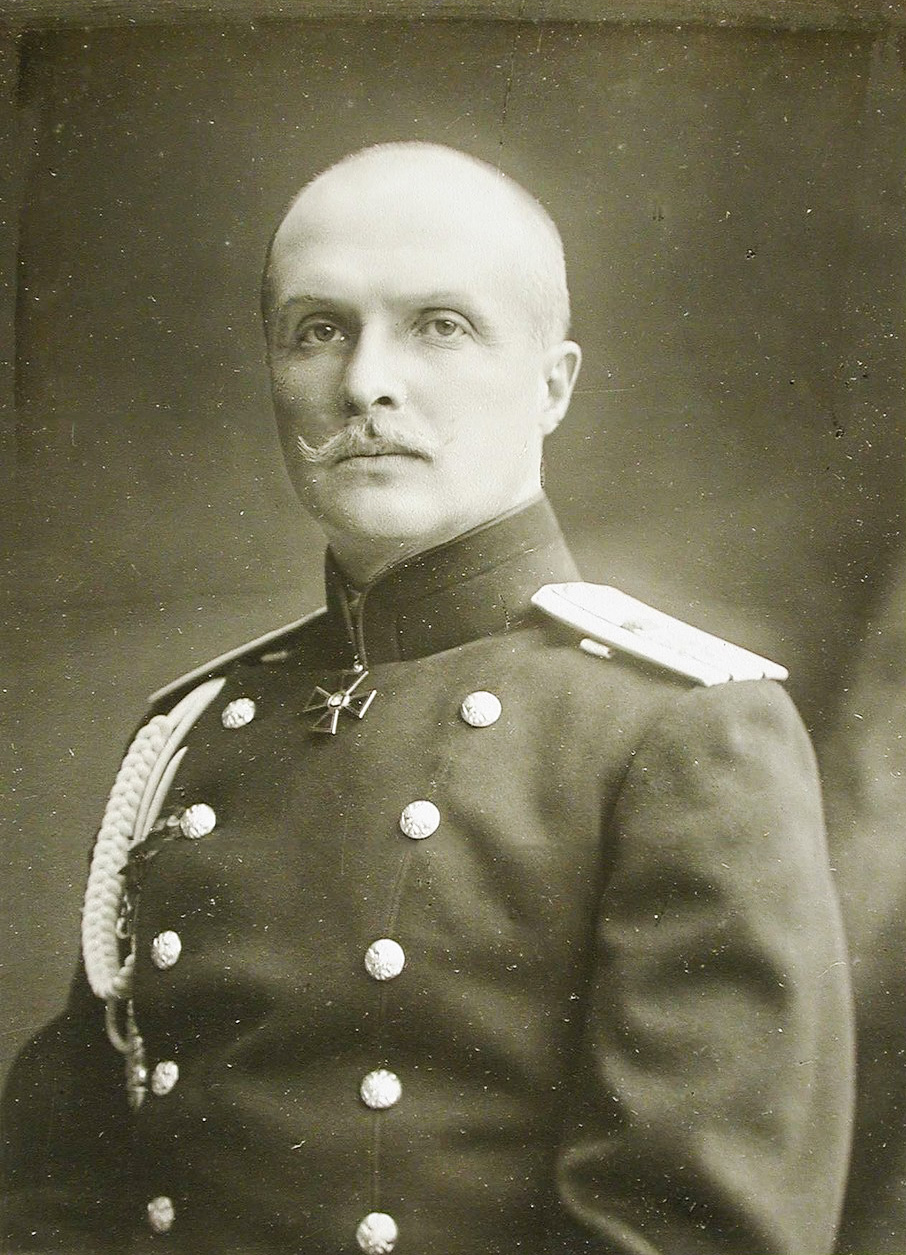
Hetman Pavlo Skoropadskyi (1918)

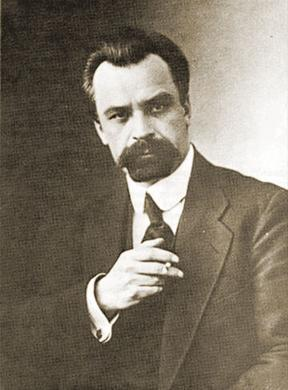
President of the Directorate Volodymyr Vynnychenko (1918–19)

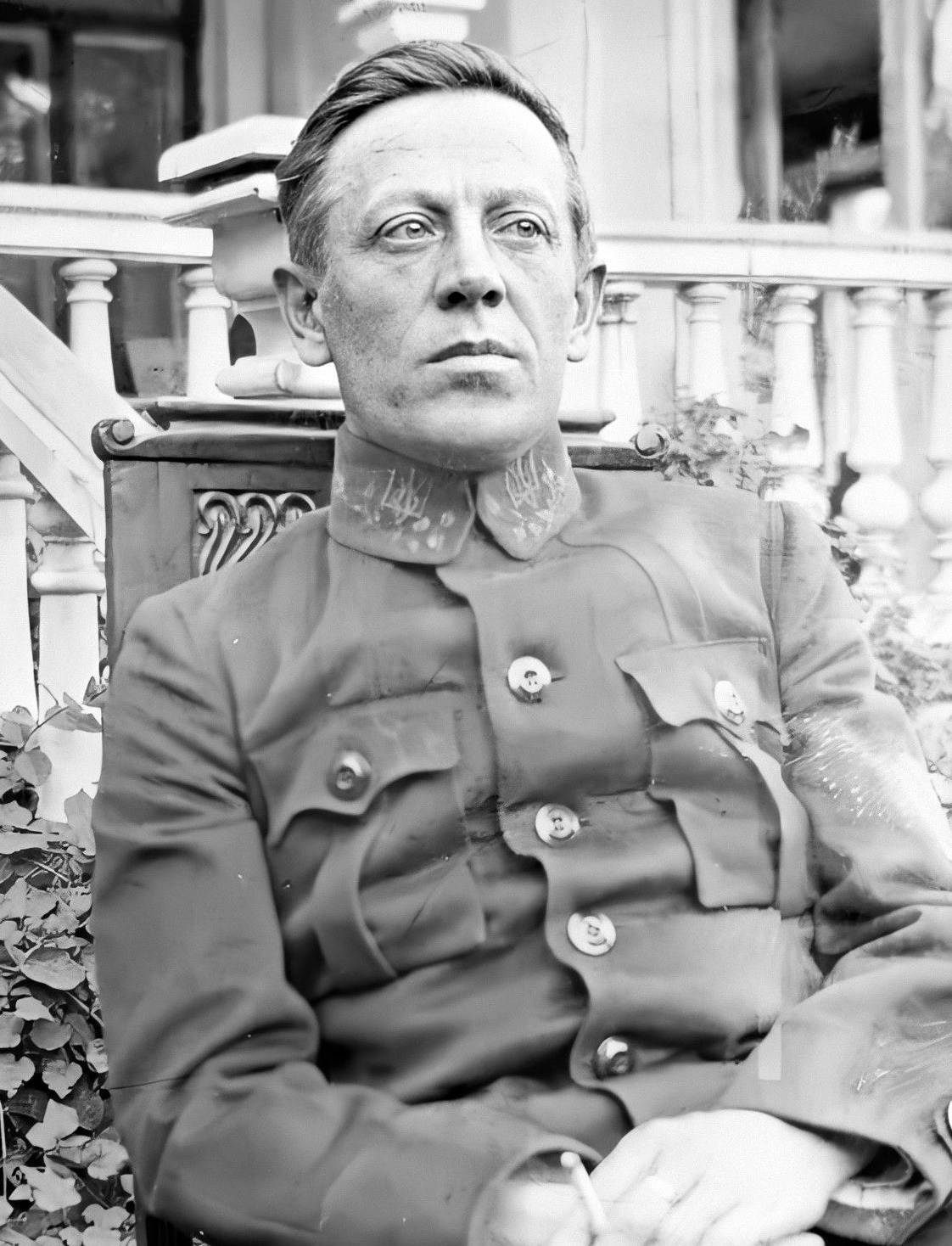
President of the Directorate Symon Petliura (1919–1926)

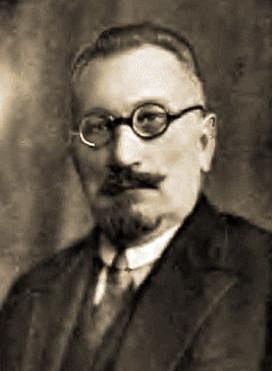
President of the Directorate Andriy Livytskyi (1926–1948)

=== Early leadership ===
Prior to the formation of the modern Ukrainian presidency, the previous Ukrainian head of state office was officially established in exile by Andriy Livytskyi. At first, the de facto leader of the nation was the president of the Central Rada in the early years of the Ukrainian People's Republic, while the highest governing body was the General Secretariat headed by its chairperson. With the proclamation of the last universal of the UPR dated 25 January 1918 due to military aggression, the Central Rada of the UPR proclaimed its independence from Russia. On 29 April 1918, the Rada elected Mykhailo Hrushevsky as the first president of the Central Rada of the Ukrainian People's Republic, in effect making him the de facto leader of the republic. Although a rather widespread misconception, the state leadership position title varied and none of them had an official "presidential" title.

On 29 April 1918 the Central Rada was arrested and liquidated during a coup d'état initiated by the local German administration to install Hetman Pavlo Skoropadskyi who barely spoke a word of the Ukrainian language. In November of the same year the directorate government of the UPR was established as the opposition movement to the Skoropadsky's regime. The Ukrainian People's Republic was soon re-established in December 1918 with Volodymyr Vynnychenko as the Directorate's chairperson, serving as the republic's de facto second "president" from 19 December 1918 to 10 February 1919. Although really the Directorate was the temporary governing body until the new Ukrainian Constituent Assembly would elect its president. Symon Petliura assumed the representation of the state after Vynnychenko's resignation on 11 February 1919 and until Petlyura's assassination in Paris on 25 May 1926.

==== Timeline ====
- 1471–1793: Voivodes of Kyiv
- 1648–1764: Hetman of the Zaporizhian Host
- 1917–1918: President of Ukrainian Central Council
- 1917–1990: First Secretary of the Communist Party
- 1918–1918: Hetman
- 1918–1948: (in exile since 1921)
- 1938–1990: Chair of the Presidium of the Supreme Soviet (de jure head of state)
- 1990–1991: Chairman of the Supreme Soviet
- 1948–1991: President (in exile)
- since 1991: President

=== In exile ===
After the Soviet offensive in 1920 brought control of the Ukrainian territory under the Ukrainian Socialist Soviet Republic, the Ukrainian People's Republic was forced into exile. Upon the assassination of Petliura, the control over the state affairs were transferred to the former Prime Minister Andriy Livytskyi who in 1948 created the office of the president of Ukraine. Livytskyi served as the first president (in exile) until January 1954. Stepan Vytvytskyi served after Livytskyi from January 1954 until his death on 9 October 1965. Following Vytvytskyi's death, Ivan Bahrianyi temporarily carried out the presidential authority until the third president-in-exile Mykola Livytskyi (son of the first president-in-exile) was sworn into office. Livytskyi served from 1967 until his death in December 1989.

Mykola Plaviuk was the last president-in-exile (and the fourth), serving from December 1989 until his resignation on 22 August 1992 when he ceremonially gave in his presidential authority and state symbols to the newly elected Ukrainian president Leonid Kravchuk at his inauguration ceremony. In his declaration, it is stated that the current Ukrainian state is the legal successor following the state traditions of the Ukrainian People's Republic, establishing the continuity of the republic.

Viktor Yanukovych has claimed to be the legitimate president of Ukraine stating that the events of the 2014 Ukrainian Revolution amounted to a coup and that the impeachment process has not been properly carried out. On 3 October 2014, a Ukrainian official said that Viktor Yanukovych and other former top officials have obtained Russian citizenship in a "secret decree" signed by Vladimir Putin. If this actually turned out to be true, it would suggest that Yanukovich had given up his claims for presidency as Ukrainian law does not allow for dual citizenship.

=== Modern presidency ===
The modern Ukrainian presidency was established on 5 July 1991 by the Verkhovna Rada of the Ukrainian Soviet Socialist Republic, which formed the office of "president of the Ukrainian SSR" (Ukrainian: Президент Української РСР). During the transitional period until the presidential elections, the Chairperson of the Verkhovna Rada (then held by Leonid Kravchuk) was empowered with a presidential authority. With the proclamation of Ukrainian independence from the Soviet Union, the office's official title was changed to "President of Ukraine" on 24 August. In the current Constitution, the Ukrainian presidency is defined in Chapter V, Articles 102–112.

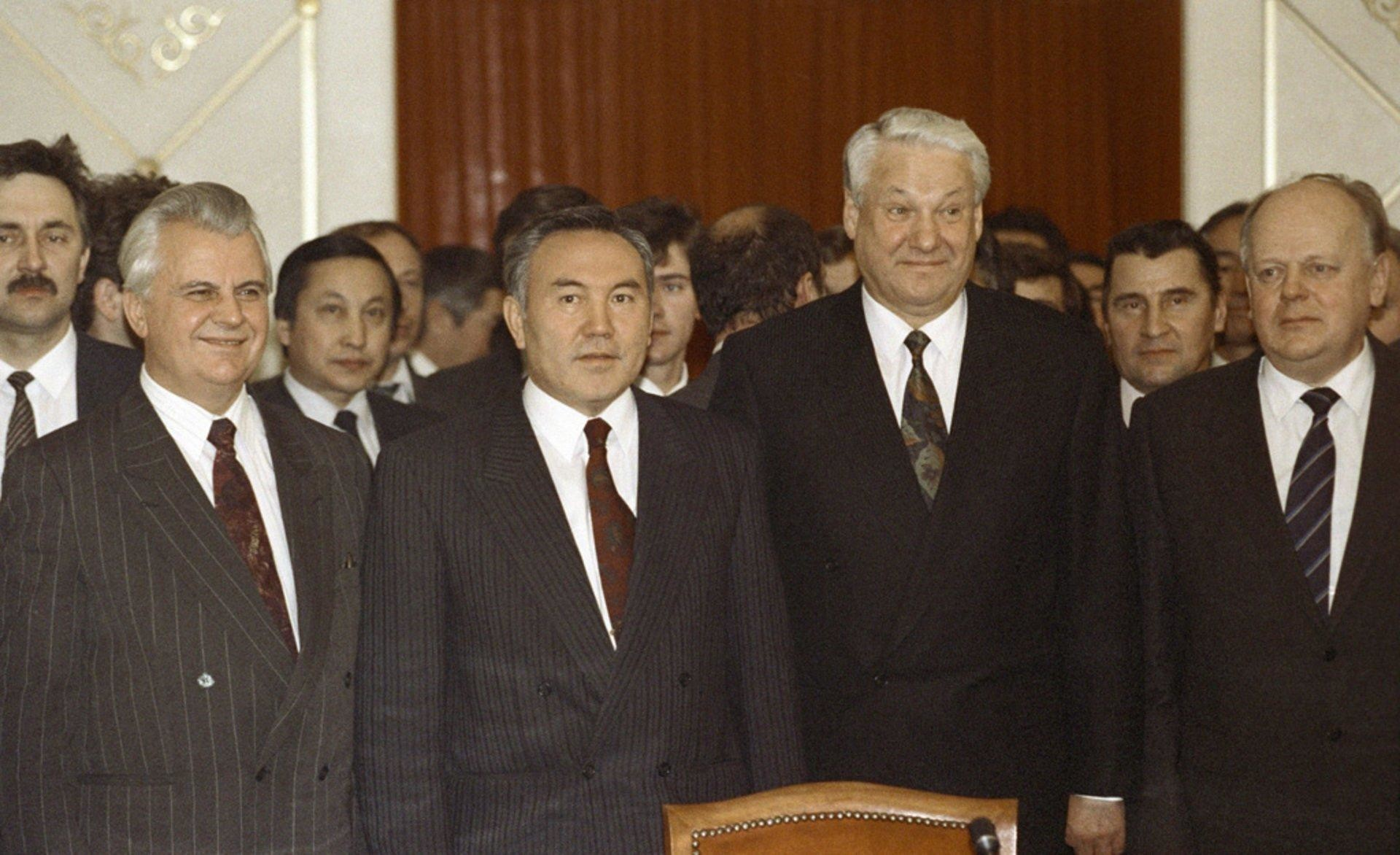
Leonid Kravchuk (left), first President of Ukraine, along with other heads of states of the newly formed Commonwealth of Independent States in 1991

So far, seven presidential elections have been conducted. The first election in 1991 was held at the same time as Ukrainians voted to support the Declaration of Independence in the independence referendum. Leonid Kravchuk was elected Ukraine's first president on 1 December 1991. He was elected by a record number of voters with over 19.5 million who wanted him to remain as the leader of the state. That number has not been beaten yet. His major opponents were the leader of Rukh Vyacheslav Chornovil and the author of the Declaration of Independence. President Kravchuk remained in office until he resigned as part of a political compromise. A snap election was held in 1994, which was won by Ukraine's former Prime Minister Leonid Kuchma. Kuchma was re-elected for a second term of office in 1999.

The 2004 election was marked by controversy with allegations of electoral fraud in the conduct of the second round runoff ballot between opposition candidate Viktor Yushchenko and the government-backed candidate and former Prime Minister Viktor Yanukovych. After mass nationwide protests, colloquially known as the "Orange Revolution", a new election was held on 26 December 2004 in which Yushchenko was declared the winner with 52% of the vote and was subsequently sworn into office on 23 January 2005. Yanukovych again served as Prime Minister.

The 2010 election took place on 17 January, with a run-off on 7 February due to a 13 May Constitutional Court ruling striking down 25 October date that the parliament called in April 2009. As a result of this election Yanukovych was elected the fourth modern president of Ukraine.

After Yanukovych was removed from power in early 2014 as a result of the 2014 Revolution of Dignity, the chairperson of parliament Oleksandr Turchynov was appointed to the role of acting president by the Verkhovna Rada in accordance with article 112 of the Constitution of Ukraine. Oleksandr Turchynov served as the acting president from 23 February until 7 June 2014 and was the only person in Ukrainian history to serve in the role. The acting president of Ukraine lacks many of the executive powers of a president and is only meant to serve for a short time before a new election can take place. During his tenure Oleksandr Turchynov was addressed as "acting president" by other Ukrainian politicians and the media.

The 2014 election took place on 25 May, with entrepreneur Petro Poroshenko winning over 54 percent of the vote; Yulia Tymoshenko was the runner up with around 13 percent. Poroshenko was sworn in as president on 7 June 2014.

On 18 June 2015 Yanukovych was officially deprived of the title of President of Ukraine.

The 2019 election took place on 31 March, with a run-off on 21 April. As a result of this election, Volodymyr Zelenskyy, a former actor and comedian with no prior political experience, became the sixth President of Ukraine, scoring a record 73.22% of the popular vote in the run-off against incumbent Poroshenko. Due to martial law in the country as a result of the 2022 Russian invasion of Ukraine, elections in the country have been suspended, and the next election originally scheduled for 2024 has been postponed.

== Election and eligibility ==
Results of the first round by electoral district: Volodymyr Zelenskyy Petro Poroshenko Yulia Tymoshenko Yuriy Boyko Election was not held due to the war in Donbas or annexation by Russia

The Ukrainian president is elected by direct popular vote by Ukrainian citizens who are 18 years and over. The president is elected for a 5-year term of office, limited to two terms consecutively.^{[b]}

Ukraine's electoral law provides for a two-round electoral system to elect the president; a candidate must win an absolute majority of all votes cast. If no candidate obtains an absolute majority in the first round of voting then the two highest polling candidates contest a run-off second ballot.

According to Chapter V, Article 103 of the Constitution, to be elected president a candidate must be a Ukrainian citizen who has attained the age of 35, has the right to vote, and has resided in the country for the past 10 years and has full command of the Ukrainian state language. Per the Constitution, regular presidential elections are scheduled to be held on the last Sunday of the last month of the fifth year of the incumbent president's term. If the president's authority has ended pre-term, then the elections must be held within 90 days of the incumbent president's end of term.

Candidates seeking election are required to pay a nomination deposit of 2,500,000 hryvnias (approx. 90,000 US Dollars) which is refunded only to those candidates that progress to the second round of voting.

The last presidential elections took place on 21 April 2019.

== Oath and term of office ==
According to Article 104 of the Constitution, the president of Ukraine assumes office no later than in thirty days after the official announcement of the election results, from the moment of taking the oath to the people at a ceremonial meeting of the Verkhovna Rada, the Ukrainian parliament. If the president is elected following special elections in the event of the previous president's resignation, impeachment or death, the president-elect must take oath of office within five days after the publication of the official election results.

The Chairperson of the Constitutional Court of Ukraine administers the oath of office. The president-elect recites the Ukrainian oath of office with their hand on the Constitution and the Peresopnytsia Gospels:^{[c]} The Ukrainian text of the oath according to the article 104 is:

Я, (ім'я та прізвище), волею народу обраний Президентом України, заступаючи на цей високий пост, урочисто присягаю на вірність Україні. Зобов'язуюсь усіма своїми справами боронити суверенітет і незалежність України, дбати про благо Вітчизни і добробут Українського народу, обстоювати права і свободи громадян, додержуватися Конституції України і законів України, виконувати свої обов'язки в інтересах усіх співвітчизників, підносити авторитет України у світі.

Official English translation:

I, (name and surname), elected by the will of the people as the President of Ukraine, assuming this high office, do solemnly swear allegiance to Ukraine. I pledge with all my undertakings to protect the sovereignty and independence of Ukraine, to provide for the good of the Motherland and the welfare of the Ukrainian people, to protect the rights and freedoms of citizens, to abide by the Constitution of Ukraine and the laws of Ukraine, to exercise my duties in the interests of all compatriots, and to enhance the prestige of Ukraine in the world.

After conducting the oath, the president signs the text of the oath of office and transfers it over to the Chairperson of the Constitutional Court.

== Duties and powers ==
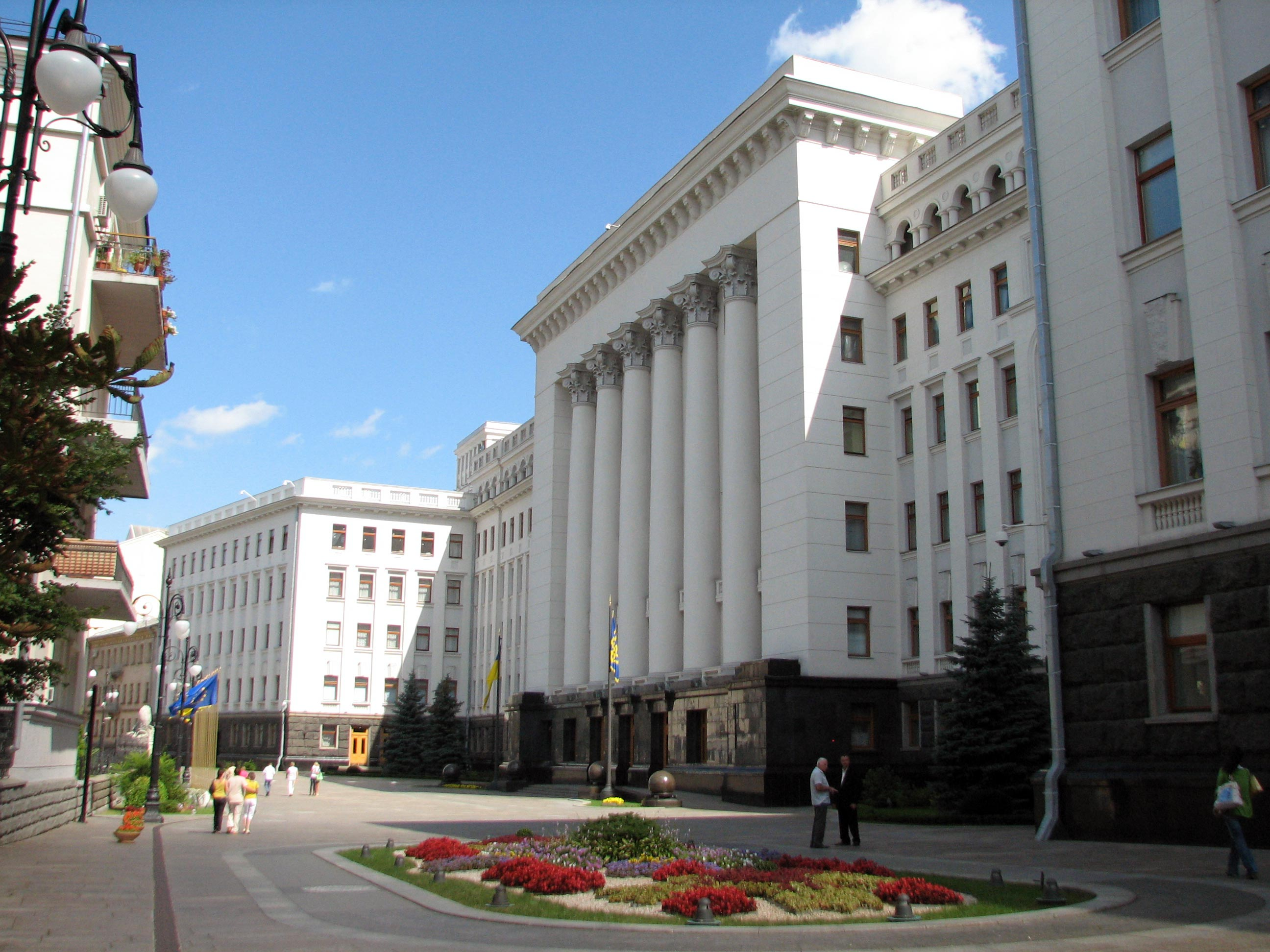
The building of the Presidential Office (unofficially called "Bankova") in central Kyiv is located on the pedestrian Bankova Street.

According to Article 102 of the Constitution, the president is the guarantor of state sovereignty and territorial indivisibility of Ukraine, the observer of the Constitution and human rights and freedoms. As stated in Article 106, the president ensures state independence, national security and the legal succession of the state, also serving as supreme commander-in-chief of the military. Unlike in other semi-presidential systems of government, the president of Ukraine does not belong to the executive branch of government. The Prime Minister is Ukraine's head of government. Thus, the president serves to represent the country and government as a whole, and not any specific branch of government. The president is obliged by the Constitution to prevent any actions of the executive, legislative and judicial branches from taking effect and interfering with the powers of the Constitution. In addition, the president is barred by the Constitution from heading a political party.

The president has the power to submit a proposal for the nomination of the Prime Minister; the Verkhovna Rada, through a constitutional majority, has to support the candidacy. Laws passed by the Verkhovna Rada have to be signed by the president to become officially promulgated. The president also has the authority to create consultative, advisory and other subordinate government bodies for their authority with the use of the state budget. The president may address the nation and the Verkhovna Rada with their annual and special addresses on domestic and foreign issues of Ukraine. They may also call for the conduction of national referendums. The president appoints the heads of local state administrations nominated by the Prime Minister for the period of their presidency.

The president represents the country and government as a whole in international affairs. The president has the authority to conduct negotiations and sign treaties on behalf of the Ukrainian government. The right to recognize foreign nations rests solely with the president. The president may appoint and dismiss heads of diplomatic missions of Ukraine to other states and to international organisations and accept the recall of diplomatic representatives to Ukraine of foreign states. Although the president does not head the executive branch of government, he has the right to nominate their candidates for Minister of Foreign Affairs and Minister of Defence in the Cabinet of Ministers of Ukraine.

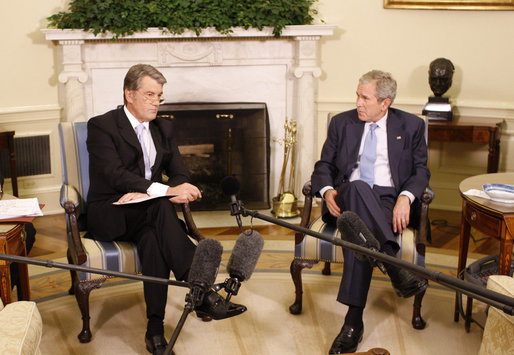
Then-president Viktor Yushchenko meeting with then-U.S. president George W. Bush in 2008

As per the checks and balances system of Ukrainian government, the president can veto laws adopted by the Verkhovna Rada (except constitutional amendments). The president wields high power in the legislative branch of government compared to other European heads of state. They may disband the parliament and call for early elections. This power has only been used twice to date, first by president Viktor Yushchenko in 2007, and by president Volodymyr Zelenskyy in 2019. The legislative branches' check on the president includes the right to overturn a presidential veto with a two-thirds majority vote of the parliament.

The president can suspend acts passed by the Cabinet of Ministers if they contradict the intent of the Constitution and challenge such acts with the Constitutional Court, one-third of which can be appointed (and dismissed) by the president. Ukrainian law also allows the president to establish new jurisdictional districts and courts. In addition, the president can select the Prosecutor General and Head of the Security Service of Ukraine with the Verkhovna Rada's consent. One-half of the Council of the National Bank of Ukraine and the National Council of Ukraine on Television and Radio Broadcasting is reserved for the president to select.

In addition to serving as the head of state, the president is the Armed Forces of Ukraine's Supreme Commander-in-Chief (Article 106, paragraph 17) and the Head of the National Security and Defence Council, which advises the president regarding national security policy on domestic and international matters. The president can submit a declaration of war to the parliament and order the use of the Ukrainian Army and military formations in defence of aggression. Martial law can also be declared on the territory of Ukraine if state independence is deemed in danger. With the confirmation of the Verkhovna Rada, a state of emergency or zones of ecological emergency can also be adopted by the president.

Unconditional pardon is reserved exclusively for the president; however, this right cannot be exercised by an acting president. The president can also confer citizens with state orders such as the Hero of Ukraine or confer high military, diplomatic and other ranks and class orders. Citizenship and political asylum in Ukraine can be granted and revoked by the president of Ukraine and as regulated by law.

The president of Ukraine appoints heads of regional state administrations (oblderzhadministratsia) after a nomination by the Cabinet of Ministers of Ukraine, presidential representatives to the Autonomous Republic of Crimea, Verkhovna Rada, and others. The president does not act as an ex officio head of state of Crimea. The president can revoke any laws passed by the Council of Ministers of Crimea that are deemed to contradict the Ukrainian Constitution and can provide the presidential consent on a nominee for Prime Minister of Crimea.

The Constitution of Ukraine states that the title of President of Ukraine is preserved by law for the lifetime of the holder, if the president is not removed from the post by impeachment proceedings.

=== List of presidential appointments ===
- Heads of diplomatic missions of Ukraine (ambassadors)
- Prime Minister of Ukraine (consent of the Verkhovna Rada), in 1996–2004 and 2010–2014
- Members of Cabinet of Ministers of Ukraine (submission of Prime-Minister), in 1996–2004 and 2010–2014
- Minister of Defence and Minister of Foreign Affairs
- Prosecutor General of Ukraine (consent of the Verkhovna Rada)
- Chairperson of the Anti-Monopoly Committee of Ukraine (consent of the Verkhovna Rada)
- Chairperson of the State Property Fund of Ukraine (consent of the Verkhovna Rada)
- Chairperson of the State Committee of Ukraine on Television and Radio-broadcasting (consent of the Verkhovna Rada)
- Members of other central bodies of executive power (submission of Prime-Minister)
- Heads of regional government (including the Presidential representative of Ukraine in Crimea) (on the submission of the Cabinet of Ministers of Ukraine for the term of office of the Head of the State)
- Members of the Council of the National Bank of Ukraine (one-half of the composition)
- Members of the National Council of Ukraine on Television and Radio-broadcasting (one-half of the composition)
- The High Command of the Armed Forces of Ukraine and main military formations
- Constitutional Court of Ukraine (one-third of the composition)
- Head of the Presidential Administration of Ukraine
- Presidential first aide
- Presidential press secretary

=== Supporting agencies ===
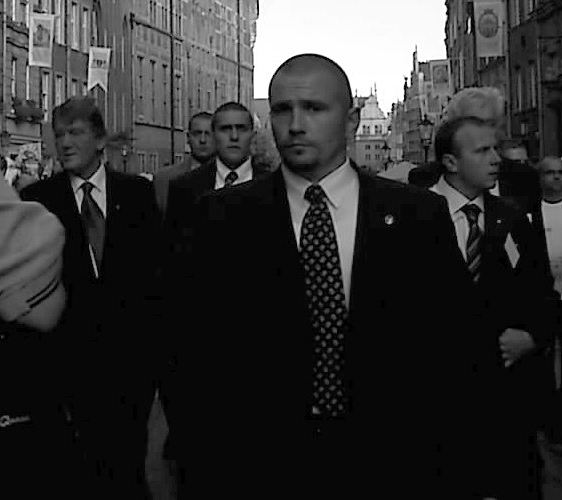
State Security bodyguards surrounding Viktor Yushchenko (far left) in Gdańsk, 2004

==== Security agencies ====
- War Cabinet
  - Stavka of the Supreme Commander-in-Chief (Armed Forces of Ukraine)
  - General Staff (Joint Operation Staff)
- National Security and Defence Council (RNBO)
- Security Service of Ukraine (SBU)
- Foreign Intelligence Service of Ukraine (SZR)
- State Special Communications Service of Ukraine (Derzhspetszvyazok)
- Pardons Commission

==== Administrative agencies ====
- National Institute of Strategic Research
- National Academy of State Administration
- Presidential Administration of Ukraine (APU)
- State Administration of Affairs (DUS)
- Local State Administrations
- Constitutional Assembly of Ukraine

== Impeachment ==
In order to impeach the president, they must be suspected of treason to the state or other crimes. A majority in the Verkhovna Rada (226 ayes) must support a procedure of impeachment for it to begin. A temporary investigative commission is established by the parliament for the impeachment investigation. The commission's final conclusions are considered at a parliamentary meeting.

To adopt an impeachment resolution, a minimum two-thirds of the parliament (300 members) must support the impeachment procedure. To remove the president from office, a minimum three-quarters of parliament (338 members) must support the resolution. The Constitutional and the Supreme Court of Ukraine's conclusions and decisions are considered at the parliamentary meetings.

== Succession ==
In the event that a president dies in office or is incapable of committing their duties as president, the Chairman of the Verkhovna Rada becomes the acting president until a new president is elected. The acting president is not given the authority to address the nation and parliament, dismiss the legislative branch and appoint candidates for parliamentary approval of government and judicial posts. The acting president cannot call for a referendum, grant military ranks and state orders and exercise their right of pardon. There are no constitutional provisions for presidential succession in case both the president and chairperson's posts are vacant.

== Privileges ==
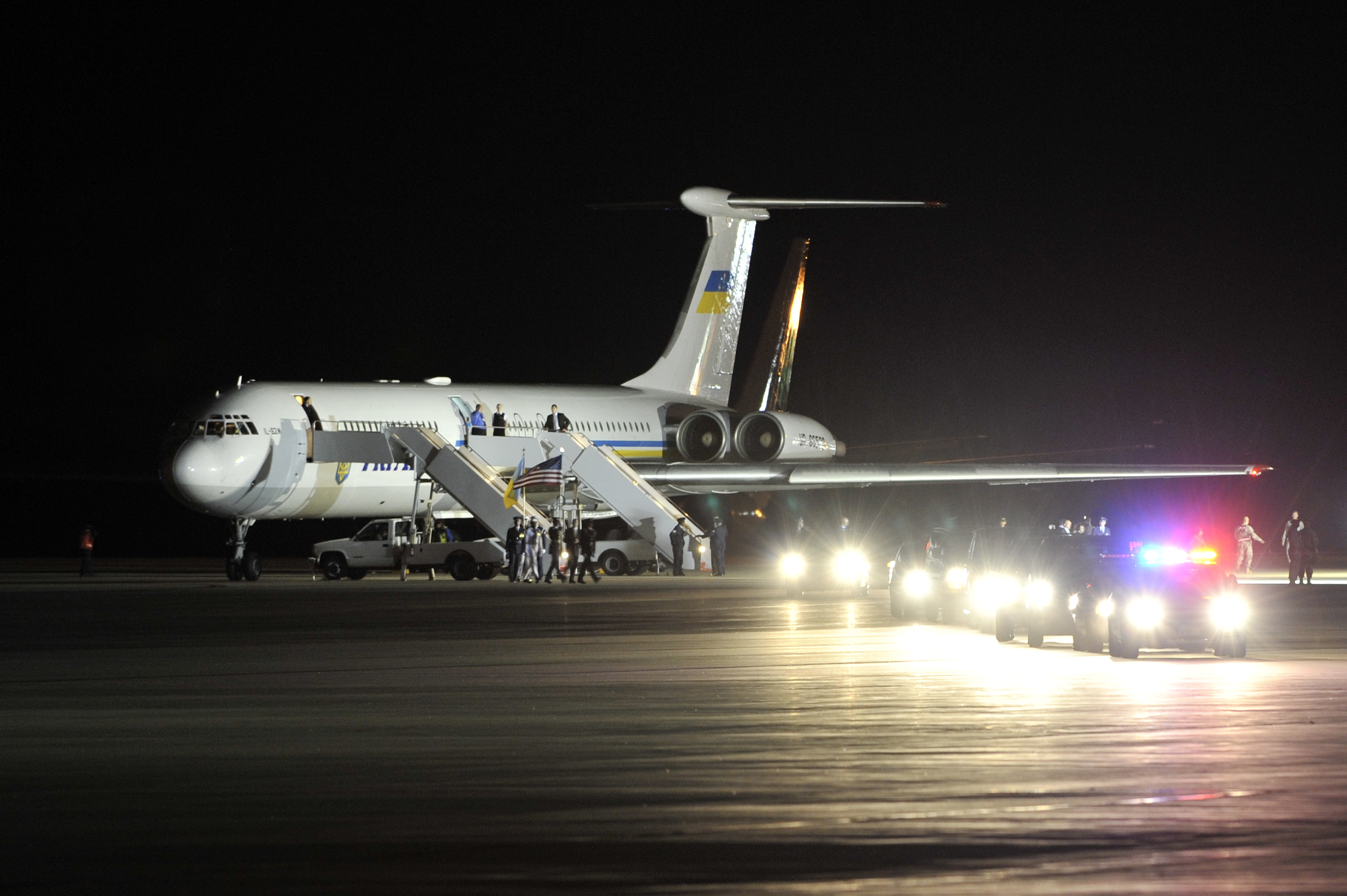
Presidential Ukraine Air Enterprise Il-62

An election as President of Ukraine garners many privileges of office to an individual. Full legal immunity is granted from all prosecutions and legal proceedings, excluding parliament's right to impeach the president during their tenure. The title of President of Ukraine itself is protected by law and is reserved for the president for life, unless they have been impeached from office. According to Article 105 of the Constitution, offending the honour and dignity of the president is punishable by law, although no such law has yet been enacted. The president's personal security is provided by the Directory of State Security of Ukraine and a separate presidential regiment provided by the Ministry of Internal Affairs.

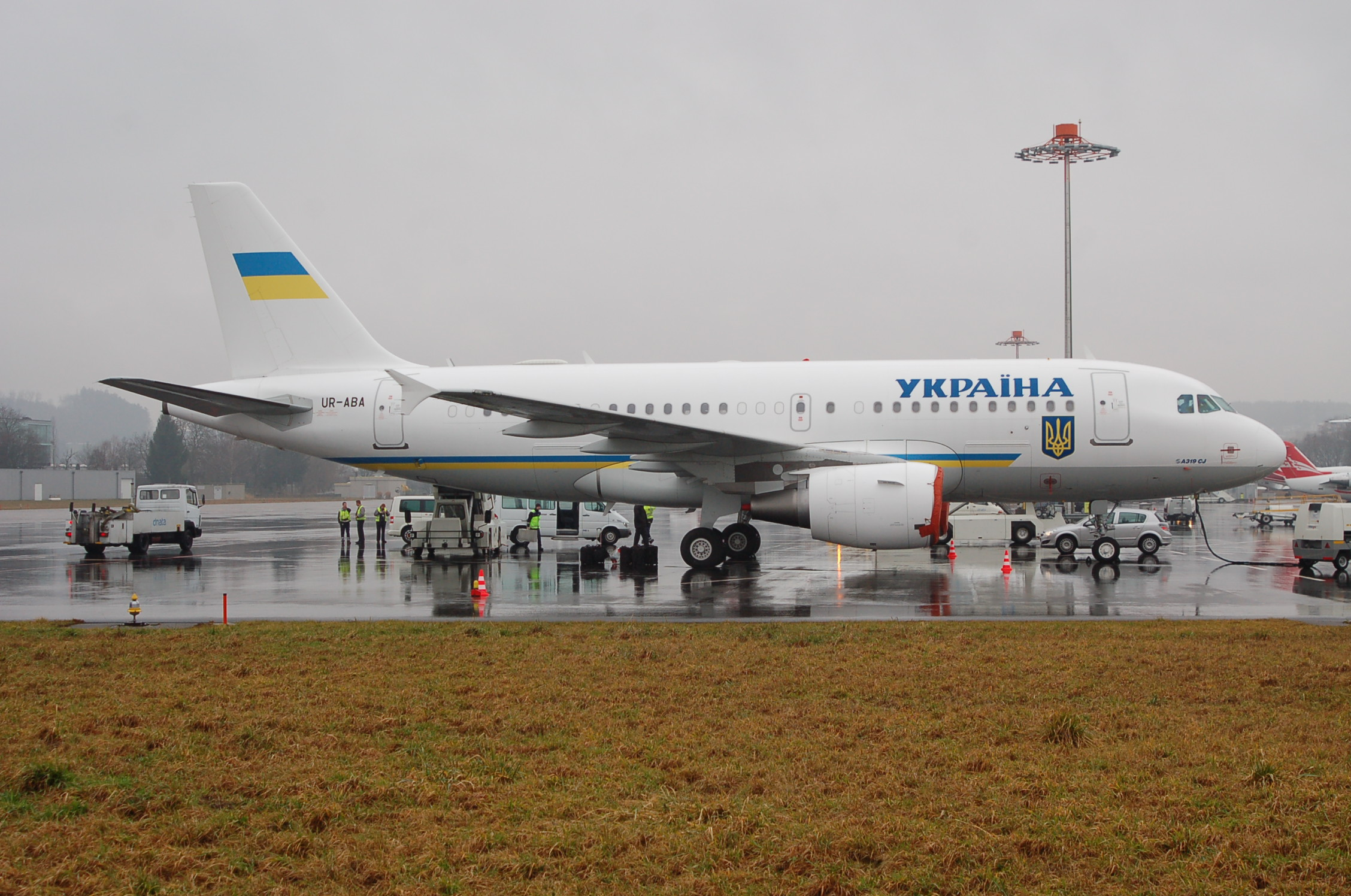
А319-100 СJ

For their services to the state, the president is allotted a yearly gross salary of ₴ 28,000/mo or 336,000/yr ($13,500/yr, 2016). All official and state visits made by the president are operated by the Ukraine Air Enterprise presidential airplanes. All required aviation transportation is provided by the State Aviation Company "Ukraina" (Ukraine Air Enterprise), the headquarters of which is located in Boryspil.

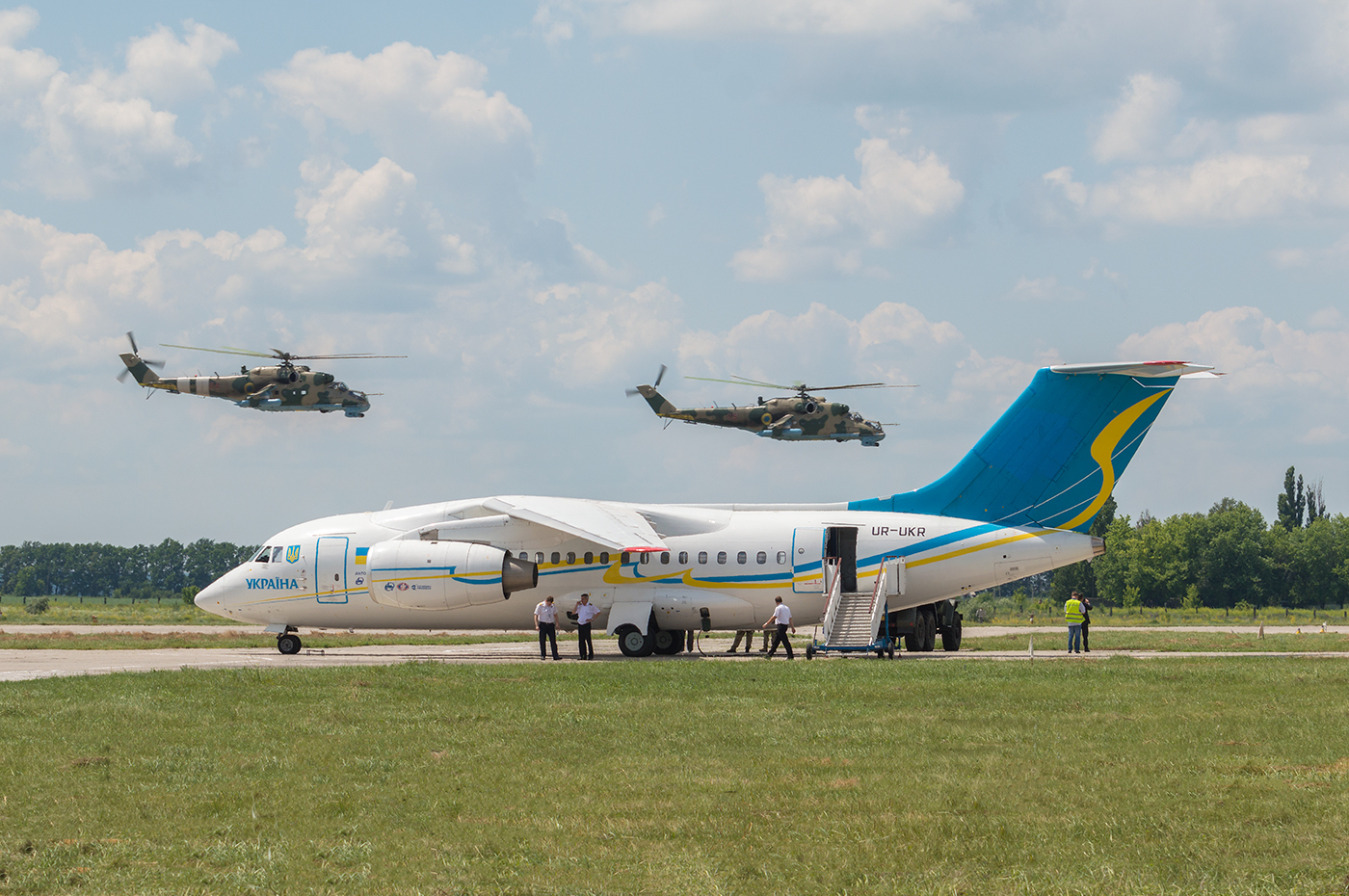
An148-100V

=== Buildings ===
The Office of the President of Ukraine is an administrative body set up to provide analytical, advisory and legal assistance to the president. It is colloquially known as "Bankova", because it is located on Bankova Street in a massive building across from the House with Chimaeras. The head of the office, the Chief Secretary, acts as the gray cardinal for the president in Ukrainian politics. Around fourteen state residences are allocated for official presidential use, many of which remain from the Kuchma-era presidency. The official ceremonial residence is the Mariinskyi Palace in Kyiv. Other state residences include the House with Chimaeras and the House of the Weeping Widow in Kyiv, the Yusupov Palace in Crimea, and Synehora in Ivano-Frankivsk Oblast. In addition, each former president has been allotted a state-owned dacha (house) in the former forest preserve in Koncha-Zaspa.

A lot of additional material-technical, social-communal, health care provision support is offered by the State Department of Affairs (abbreviated as DUS) that is created for state officials and subordinated to the president of Ukraine. DUS is a supporting state agency that was restructured in 2000 out of the Presidential Directory of Affairs. Primarily the agency is designated for the president and its administration, while also provides support for the Cabinet of Ministers, parliament, and other state agencies if budget permits.

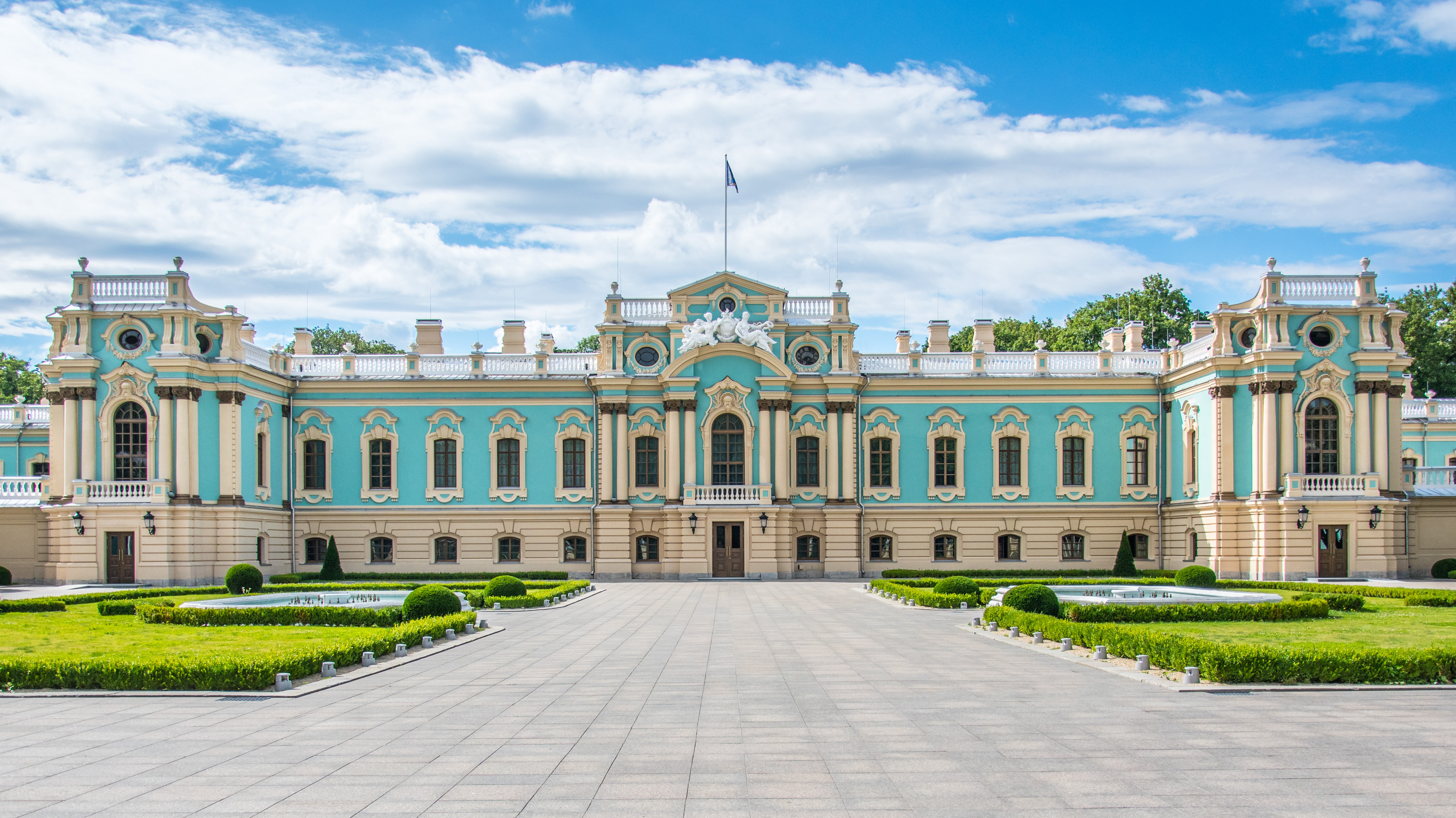
The facade of the Mariinskyi Palace, the president's ceremonial residence

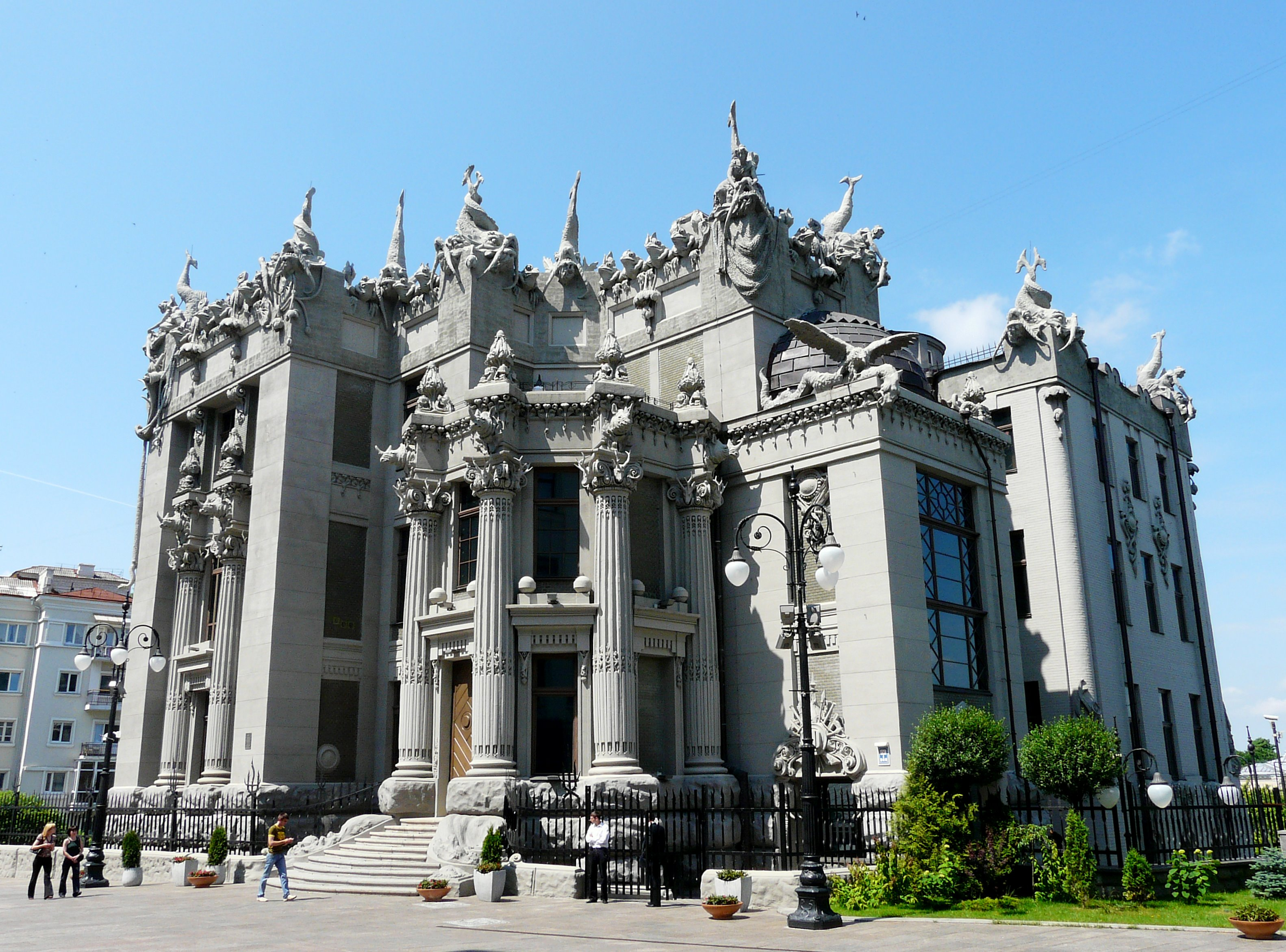
The House with Chimaeras is located across from the presidential administration.

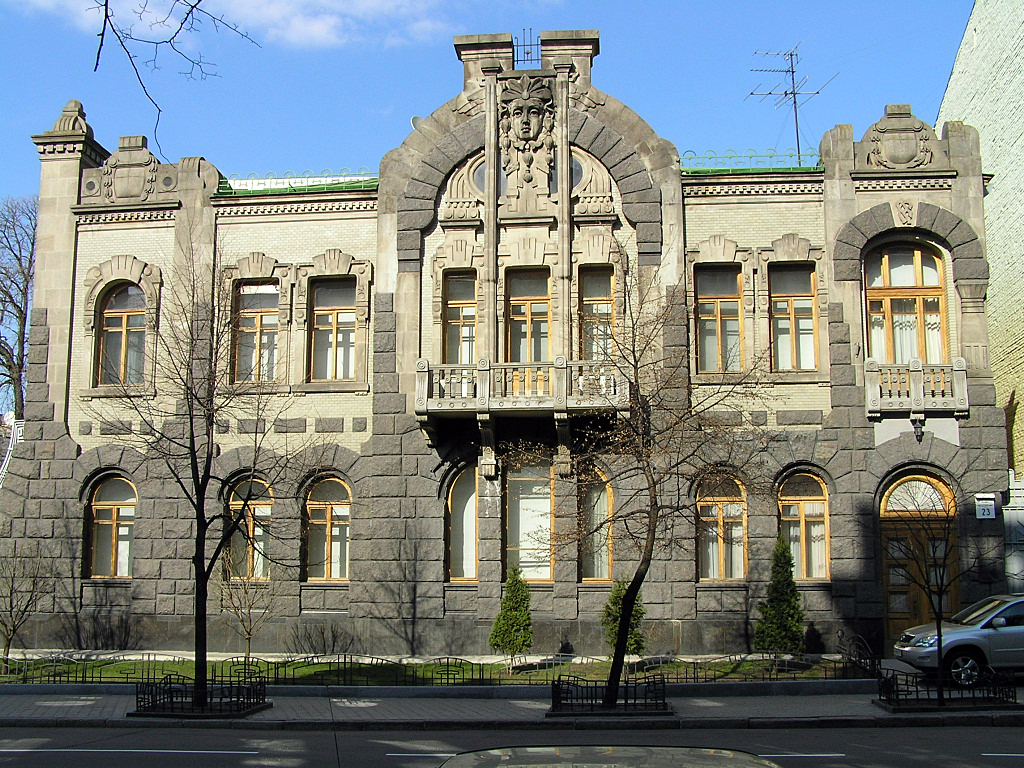
The House of the Weeping Widow is used to house official state visitors.

=== Official symbols ===
The president's official state symbols consists of the presidential standard, the presidential seal, the presidential ID card, the presidential collar, and the bulava of the president of Ukraine. The presidential symbols, along with other important presidential documents and media, are contained in the Vernadsky National Library of Ukraine, the country's main academic library. For the president's use, the library prepares documents and analytical materials.

=== Family ===
The president's spouse is recognized as the First Lady, much in the similar fashion as in other countries, although such a title holds no official and legal responsibility and is often undisclosed. However, during the Yushchenko Presidency, his marriage to Kateryna Yushchenko and their private life drew a lot of attention from the media. Apart from Kateryna Yushchenko, little else is known about the other presidential spouses.

The tradition of the Ukrainian "first family" was established by Kuchma, who became the in-law to his daughter's husband and politician Viktor Pinchuk. During the presidency of Viktor Yanukovych, the "first family" meaning was taken to the next level whose son Viktor became a parliamentarian of Verkhovna Rada with the same political party affiliation.

== Presidential awards ==
The distinction of "Honorary Weapon" is awarded by the president. The specific weapon is a 9-mm caliber Fort-21.02 pistol with 16 bullets. The body pistol is made of structural steel, with the handle is made of noble wood. The name of the awardee is engraved on the plate. This distinction was established in 1995 under President Leonid Kuchma, who himself has awarded the most pistols, numbering at 85. From 1995 to 2018, the Presidents have issued honorary weapons to 152 persons. Since 2019, no one has been awarded an honorary weapon.

== See also ==
- List of leaders of Ukraine
- Separate Presidential Brigade

== Notes ==
a. As President of the Ukrainian Soviet Socialist Republic.

b. Per Chapter V, Article 103 of the Constitution of Ukraine, the President is allowed to serve a maximum of two full 5-year terms. However, in 2003, the Constitutional Court of Ukraine permitted then-President Leonid Kuchma to run for a third term in the 2004 presidential election because the Constitution, adopted in 1996, did not retroactively apply to his first term. (He chose not to run.) "Summary to the Decision no. 22-rp/2003 of the Constitutional Court of Ukraine as of 25 December 2003". Constitutional Court of Ukraine. 25 December 2003. Archived from the original (Microsoft Word document) on 28 July 2011.

C. Official Ukrainian text of the oath: "Я, (ім'я та прізвище), волею народу обраний Президентом України, заступаючи на цей високий пост, урочисто присягаю на вірність Україні. Зобов'язуюсь усіма своїми справами боронити суверенітет і незалежність України, дбати про благо Вітчизни і добробут Українського народу, обстоювати права і свободи громадян, додержуватися Конституції України і законів України, виконувати свої обов'язки в інтересах усіх співвітчизників, підносити авторитет України у світі." Source: Стаття 104. Constitution of Ukraine (in Ukrainian). Verkhovna Rada of Ukraine. Archived from the original on 25 December 2018.

D. Although Leonid Kravchuk's official inauguration ceremony was conducted on 22 August 1992, he carried out most of the presidential responsibilities temporarily ceded to him as Chairman of the Verkhovna Rada until 5 December 1991 when he became president.
