= Antonina Kravchuk =

Wife of the first Ukrainian president

- Антоніна Кравчук
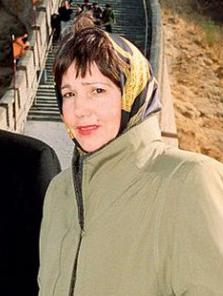

First Lady of Ukraine
- In role 5 December 1991 – 19 July 1994
- President: Leonid Kravchuk
- Preceded by: Position established
- Succeeded by: Lyudmyla Kuchma

Personal details
- Born: Antonina Mykhailivna Mishura; November 3, 1935 (age 90) Vyry, Bilopillia Raion, Sumy Oblast, Ukraine SSR, Soviet Union
- Spouse: Leonid Kravchuk (m. 1957; died 2022)
- Children: 1
- Occupation: Former First Lady of Ukraine

Antonina Mykhailivna Kravchuk (Ukrainian: Антоніна Михайлівна Кравчук, née Mishura, Мішура; born 3 November 1935) is a Ukrainian former educator and publisher, who served as First Lady of Ukraine from 1991 to 1994 as the wife of President Leonid Kravchuk.

== Biography ==
Antonina Mykhailivna Mishura was born in the village of Vyry, Bilopillia Raion, Sumy Oblast, Ukraine SSR on November 3, 1935. In 1958, she graduated from the Faculty of Economics of Taras Shevchenko National University of Kyiv. PhD in Economics.

She worked as an associate professor of the economic faculty of the Taras Shevchenko National University of Kyiv. She was the founder of the magazine "Personnel", the All-Ukrainian general political educational weekly "Personnel Plus" at the Joint-Stock Company Interregional Academy of Personnel Management (MAUP).

Since 1957, she has been married to Leonid Kravchuk. She rarely attended official events with her husband.

Antonina Mishura has one child, Oleksandr Leonidovych Kravchuk (born 1959), president of the State Company "Nafkom-Ahro" and the former FC Nafkom Brovary. Kravchuk has two grandchildren and one great-granddaughter. Although Kravchuk does not work for the Ukrainian state anymore she is still living in a state-owned dacha in Koncha-Zaspa.

Honorary titles
| Preceded by | First Lady of Ukraine; 1991–1994 | Succeeded by Lyudmyla Kuchma |
