= President of Ukraine (in exile) =

Head of the Ukrainian People's Republic in exile

President of the Government of the Ukrainian People's Republic in exile Ukrainian: Президент УНР в екзилі
- Coat of arms of the UPR

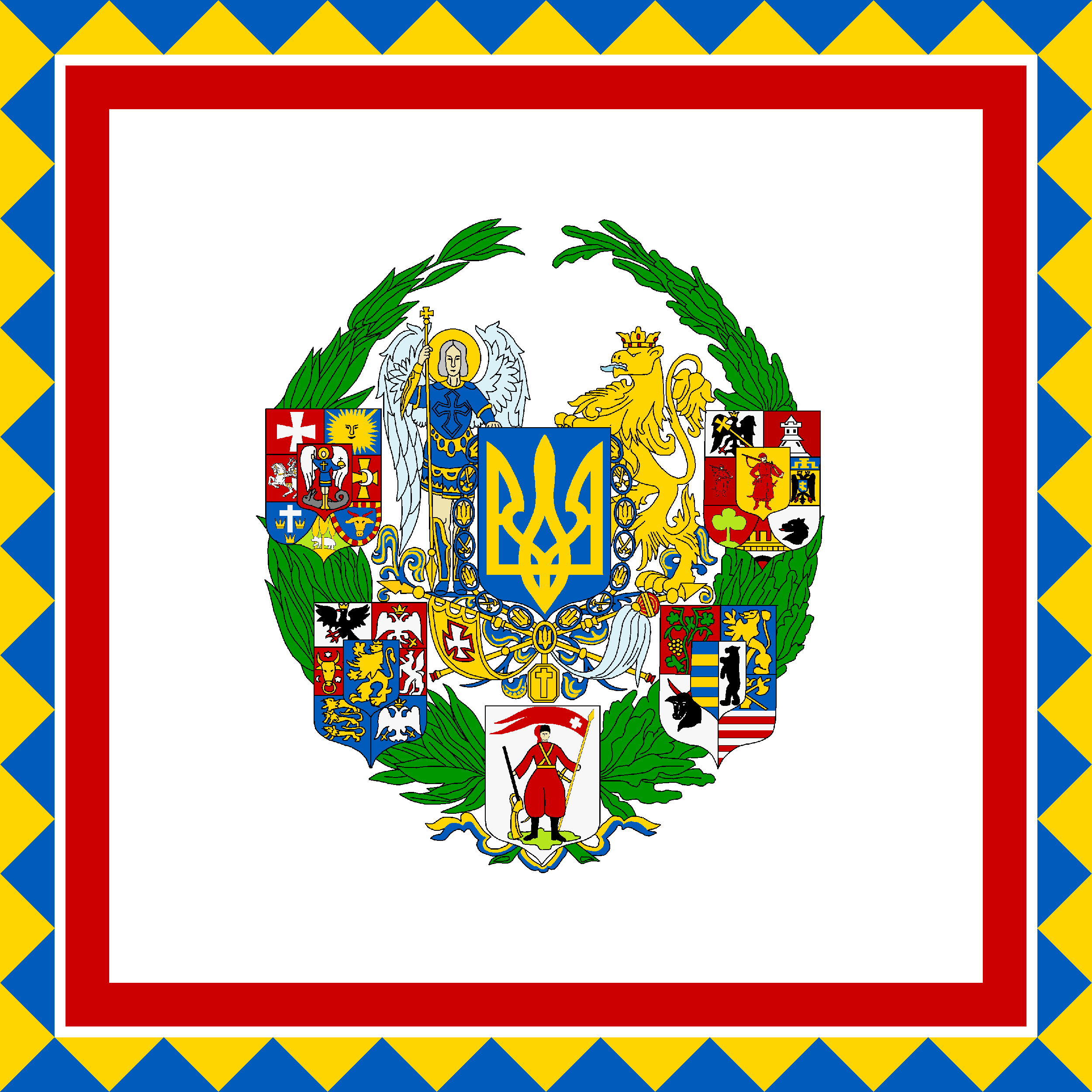
- Standard of the President of the Ukrainian People's Republic in exile
- Appointer: Ukrainian National Council
- Term length: Decision of Ukrainian National Council
- Inaugural holder: Andriy Livytskyi, July 10, 1948
- Formation: Provisional law about reorganization of the State Center of the Ukrainian People's Republic in exile, July 10, 1948
- Final holder: Mykola Plaviuk
- Abolished: August 22, 1992
- Succession: Head of government
- Deputy: Vice-President of the UPR in exile

The President of the Ukrainian People's Republic in exile (Ukrainian: Президент УНР в екзилі) was an official position of the Government of the Ukrainian People's Republic in exile after World War II. The post was created out of the "Chairman of the Directorate of Ukraine".

== History ==
=== Ukrainian People's Republic ===
On July 10, 1948, there was adopted a "Provisional law about the reorganisation of the State Center of the Ukrainian People's Republic in exile" which was coordinated between various Ukrainian political organizations. Andriy Livytskyi, who was a chairman of the Directorate of Ukraine, was confirmed by the Ukrainian National Council as the President of the Ukrainian People's Republic in exile. From 1948 to 1992, four presidents of UNR were in exile. On March 15, 1992, an extraordinary session of the Ukrainian National Council adopted a resolution "About handing over authority of the State Center of UNR in exile to the state power in Kyiv and termination of work of the State Center of UNR in exile". The last president Mykola Plaviuk officially handed over his presidential powers to the newly elected President of Ukraine Leonid Kravchuk on August 22, 1992.

Under the 1948 law, the president was to be elected or confirmed by the Ukrainian National Council. He had a right to participate in sessions of the Ukrainian National Council and its presidium, represent the State Center of UNR in exile in foreign relationships, appoint a head of government and, on the recommendations of that head of government, members of the government. In exceptional cases the President could dissolve the Ukrainian National Council on the proposal of the government. The government of UNR was responsible and accountable to both the President as well as the council. All presidents except the last one held the title for the rest of their lives.

The UNR in exile also had a position of a vice-president.

=== Russian invasion ===
In March 2022, the United States national security officials had discussed plans to establish Volodymyr Zelenskyy's government-in-exile in the event the national capital Kyiv fell to Russian forces and a puppet regime instituted. Instead, President Zelenskyy refused evacuation offers, and publicly vowed to remain in Ukraine and lead resistance against Russian forces. Ultimately, the Russian forces failed to capture Kyiv due to persistent logistical problems and strong Ukrainian resistance, thereby eliminating the need to establish a government-in-exile.

== List of presidents ==
USDLP UNDA UNSU OUN

#	President	Elected (event)	Took office	Left office	
1	Andriy Livytskyi (1879–1954); Андрій Лівицький	Augsburg	10 July 1948	17 January 1954	assumed office after being the Chairman of Directorate (1926–1948)
2	Stepan Vytvytskyi (1884–1965); Степан Витвицький	Munich	17 January 1954	9 October 1965	
3	Mykola Livytskyi (1907–1989); Микола Лівицький	Munich	9 October 1965	8 December 1989	
4	Mykola Plaviuk (1925–2012); Микола Плав'юк		8 December 1989	22 August 1992	handed over his presidential powers to Leonid Kravchuk (President of Ukraine)

== See also ==
- Government of the Ukrainian People's Republic in exile
- List of leaders of Ukraine
- President of Ukraine
- Ukrainian People's Republic
- Viktor Yanukovych
