= Stepan Vytvytskyi =

Ukrainian politician and diplomat (1954–1965)

- Степан Витвицький
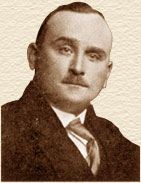

2nd President of Ukraine in exile
- In office 17 January 1954 – 9 October 1965
- Preceded by: Andriy Livytskyi
- Succeeded by: Mykola Livytskyi

Personal details
- Born: 13 March 1884 Uhornyky, Austro-Hungary (now within Ivano-Frankivsk, Ukraine)
- Died: 9 October 1965 (aged 81) New York City, U.S.
- Spouse: Melaniya Vytvytska

Stepan Porfyrovych Vytvytskyi (Ukrainian: Степан Порфирович Витвицький; 13 March 1884 – 9 October 1965), also known as Dr. Stepan Wytwycki, was a Ukrainian politician, diplomat, and journalist. He was the President of the Ukrainian People's Republic in exile (1954–1965).

== Biography ==
Stepan Vytvytskyi was born on 13 March 1884, in the village of Uhornyky, near to the city of Stanislawow, Kingdom of Galicia and Lodomeria in Austria-Hungary (now in Ivano-Frankivsk Oblast, Western Ukraine). He studied at the law faculties of the Lviv and Vienna Universities. During his years as a student, Vytvytskyi was the head of Academic Hromada in Lviv and the organization Sich in Vienna. In 1910, he began his practice as a lawyer in Drohobych. In 1914, he entered the Legion of Ukrainian Sich Riflemen military organization. From 1915 to 1918, he was a member of the editorial board of the newspaper Dila, and an editor on the Svoboda newspaper, both being based in Lviv.

While being a member of the Ukrainian National-Democratical Party (UNDP) in October 1918, he was elected as a secretary of the Ukrainian National Rada of the West Ukrainian People's Republic (ZUNR). He was a member of the Ukrainian People's Republic (UPR) Tsentralna Rada and the governmental secretary of foreign affairs of the UPR. As a secretary of the Ukrainian National Rada, he was a member of the delegation of the ZUNR at the Worker's Congress of Ukraine in Kyiv, and a delegation member of the act of merging the ZUNR and UPR on January 22, 1919.

Since October 1919, he was the speaker of the diplomatic missions of the Directory of Ukraine in Warsaw. For some time, Vytvytskyi headed the secretary of foreign affairs in the government of ZUNR in exile in Vienna. In 1921−1923, he headed the ZUNR mission in Paris and London, hoping the governments of these countries (France, United Kingdom) would recognize the 'occupation' of the eastern territory of Eastern Galicia, ie. in their view Western Ukraine, by Poland, and help with the re-establishment of Ukraine's independence.

In 1924, he continued his lawyer practice in Drohobych. From 1935 to 1939, he was elected to the Polish Sejm from the Drohobycz district. With the occupation of Galicia by Bolsheviks in 1939, he left Drohobych and emigrated to the West. In 1945, he was elected as the co-speaker of the Central Ukrainian Emigration Commission in Germany. After the death of Andriy Livytskyi in 1954, Stepan Vytvytskyi was elected as the president of the Ukrainian People's Republic in exile. He died in New York City on October 9, 1965, and was buried at the cemetery of Bound Brook, New Jersey.

Political offices
Preceded by Andriy Livytskyi	President of Ukraine in exile 1954–1965	Succeeded by Mykola Livytskyi
