= Andriy Livytskyi =

Ukrainian politician, diplomat, statesman and lawyer

- Андрій Лівицький
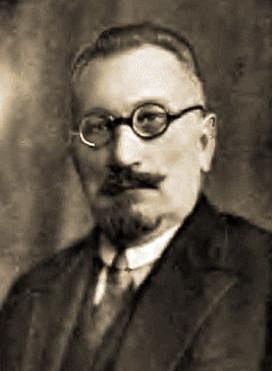
- Livytskyi in 1937

1st President of Ukraine in exile
- In office 16 July 1948 – 17 January 1954
- Preceded by: position created
- Succeeded by: Stepan Vytvytskyi

3rd Chairman of the Directory
- In office May 1926 – 16 July 1948
- Preceded by: Symon Petliura
- Succeeded by: position reformed (as President of Republic)

Prime Minister of UPR
- In office 1922–1926
- President: Directoria
- Preceded by: Pylyp Pylypchuk
- Succeeded by: Vyacheslav Prokopovych

Prime Minister of UPR
- In office 14 October 1920 – 18 November 1920
- President: Directoria
- Preceded by: Vyacheslav Prokopovych
- Succeeded by: Pylyp Pylypchuk

Personal details
- Born: Andrii Mykolaiovych Livytskyi; 9 April 1879 Krasnyi Kut, near Liplyave, Poltava Governorate, Russian Empire (now Ukraine)
- Died: 17 January 1954 (aged 74) Karlsruhe, West Germany
- Spouse: Mariya Livytska
- Children: Natalia and Mykola

Andriy Mykolaiovych Livytskyi (Ukrainian: Андрій Миколайович Лівицький; 9 April 1879 – 17 January 1954) was a Ukrainian politician, diplomat, statesman, and lawyer.

He was president of the Ukrainian People's Republic in exile (1948–1954) and the Chairman of the Directory prior to reforming that office into the presidential.

== Biography ==
Andriy Livytskyi was born on 9 April 1879 in Lyplyavo (at the time part of the Russian Empire) into an old Cossack family. He finished the Gymnasium of Pavlo Halahana in Kyiv, and later went on to study at the mathematical and juridical faculties of the St. Volodymyr Kyiv University in 1896. In 1897 and 1899 he was held in the Lukyanivska Prison in Kyiv for participation in protests. He was expelled from the university and exiled to Poltava Governorate under the secret surveillance of police for taking part in the student's strike of 1899. After obtaining his university diploma in 1903, he served in the Lubny Circuit Court, and then, since 1905, he was a barrister of the Kharkiv Court Chamber, and in 1913–1917 an elected judge of Zolotonosha uezd in the Poltava Governorate. In his studential years, he took part in the Ukrainian independence movement, heading one of the organization's bases in Kyiv.

From 1901, he belonged to the Revolutionary Ukrainian Party (RUP), heading its regional headquarters in Lubny. He was jailed once again in connections to the revolutionary activities of 1906 and after escaping was imprisoned again in 1907. Since 1917, Livytskyi was a member of the Central Rada and the Peasant Union (Ukraine). In the period of the Hetmanate (1918), he was a member of the Ukrainian National Union, in opposition to the government of Pavlo Skoropadskyi. Later during the time of the Directorate of Ukraine, he was one of the founders of the Labour Council of Ukraine - the highest governing body of Ukraine. Livytskyi also held positions as the Minister of Justice and the deputy of the Rada of National Ministers of the Ukrainian People's Republic (UPR) in 1919, as well as the head of the Ministry of Foreign Affairs in the government of Isaak Mazepa in 1919. From 14 October to 18 November 1920 he served as the Prime Minister of the Ukrainian People's Republic.

Since October 1919, he was in the Ukrainian delegation to Warsaw, where he was working on the formation of the Ukrainian-Polish agreement, which was signed in 1920. After the defeat of the Ukrainian national movement for independence, he was forced to emigrate. From 1920 to 1948, he served as the head of the government of the Ukrainian People's Republic (UPR) in exile. After Symon Petliura's assassination, he became the head of the Directorate of Ukraine and assumed the post of the Chief Otaman of the Ukrainian People's Republic Army in exile in 1926.

Since that time to the time of his death, Livytskyi served as the head of state for the government of the UPR. He lived in Warsaw under constant watch of the Polish police. Close to the end of World War II, Livytskyi cooperated with the Germans, lending his support to the Ukrainian National Committee in 1945. After the war, he sought to consolidate his political activities and reorganized the government of the UPR in exile. Its first session was opened on 16 July 1948 in Augsburg, Germany. In cooperation with Isaak Mazepa, he created the Ukrainian National Rada in exile in 1948 and became the First President of the Ukrainian People's Republic in exile.

He died on 17 January 1954 in Karlsruhe, West Germany, and was later buried in the Waldfriedhof Cemetery in Munich and later his ashes were transferred to Ukrainian Memorial Cemetery in Bound Brook in the vicinity of New York City, United States.

Political offices
Preceded by introduced	President of Ukraine in exile 1948–1954	Succeeded by Stepan Vytvytskyi
Military offices
Preceded by Symon Petliura	Chief of General Bulawa; Chief Otaman; 1926–1954	Succeeded by position liquidated
