= Mykola Livytskyi =

Ukrainian-American politician (1907–1989)

- Микола Лівицький
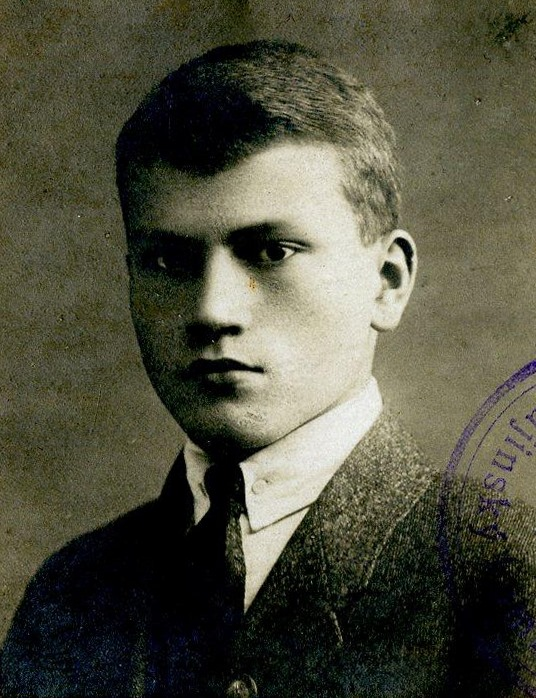
- Livytskyi in 1939

3rd President of Ukraine in exile
- In office 9 October 1965 – 8 December 1989
- Preceded by: Stepan Vytvytskyi
- Succeeded by: Mykola Plaviuk

Personal details
- Born: 7 January 1907 Zhmerinka, Russian Empire
- Died: 8 December 1989 (aged 82) Philadelphia, Pennsylvania, United States
- Spouse: Helga Livytska
- Parents: Andriy Livytskyi (father); Mariya Livytska (mother)
- Education: Warsaw School of Economics; University of Geneva

Mykola Andriiovych Livytskyi (Ukrainian: Микола Андрійович Лівицький; 7 January 1907 – 8 December 1989) was a Ukrainian politician and journalist. He was the prime minister (1957–1967) and the president of the Ukrainian People's Republic in exile (1967–1989).

== Biography ==
He was born into a noble family in Zhmerynka, now Vinnytsia oblast, Ukraine, then Vinnytsia district, Podillia province, Russian Empire. The son of Andriy Livytskyi.

He studied at the 1st Shevchenko Ukrainian School in Kyiv.

In 1920, he went abroad with his father, who was then the chairman of the Council of People's Ministers of the Ukrainian People's Republic. He continued his secondary education at matriculation courses in Prague at the Ukrainian Economic Academy. He graduated from the Higher School of Commerce in Warsaw, the Faculty of Economics and Social Sciences at the University of Geneva, and received a master's degree in commercial sciences.

He was an activist in the student movement, and was elected the first chairman of the newly created Zaporizhzhia Student Corporation in Warsaw. He participated in the congresses of the Central Union of Ukrainian Students and was one of the publishers of the Student Voice magazine (1927-1928, Warsaw).

In the 1930s, he studied economics and journalism in Warsaw and Geneva. In 1923-1939, he was secretary of the delegation of the Ukrainian People's Republic to the League of Nations. He was a special correspondent for the Tryzub magazine in Geneva and the head of the Geneva branch of the Ukrainian Press Bureau. In 1932, through his lawyer Samuel Pidhirsky, he mitigated the charges against Yurii Kosach, instructing him to develop a “Plan for the Development of the National Movement in Volyn.”

In 1938-1939, on behalf of the UPR government in exile, he was in Carpathian Ukraine to coordinate the actions of its government and administration with the exiled UPR government.

In 1937-1942 he was engaged in diplomatic work in Europe. During the Second World War, he lived for some time in Warsaw, and in 1942 moved to Kyiv to establish political work there. Shortly afterward, he was imprisoned by the Gestapo.

He was one of the founders and leaders of the Ukrainian National-State Union (UNSU): deputy chairman (from 1946), chairman of the UNSU (from 1951). In 1948-1950, he headed the Union of Ukrainian Journalists in Exile, and later took over the leadership of the Ukrainian National-State Union. From 1949 he was a member of the executive body (government) of the Ukrainian National Council, and from 1957 to 1967 he was the chairman (prime minister) of the executive body (government) of the Ukrainian People's Republic and Minister of Foreign Affairs.

He was the editor of the newspaper Meta of the Ukrainian Information Bureau in Munich (1954-1957).

In 1967-1989, he was President of the Ukrainian People's Republic in exile. As president of the UPR, he proved himself to be more of an authoritarian figure, which provoked a conflict between the parties that were part of the UNR Rada in the 1970s. The conflict was resolved after the adoption of the Temporary Law, which somewhat democratized the State Center of the UPR in exile.

He wrote a number of works, including “West - East and the Problem of Nations Enslaved by Moscow” (1975), “The State Center of the UPR in Exile between 1920 and 1940” (1984).

He is buried at the Ukrainian Orthodox cemetery in South Bound Brook, New Jersey.

Political offices
Preceded by Stepan Vytvytskyi	President of Ukraine in exile 1965–1989	Succeeded by Mykola Plaviuk
