= Mykola Plaviuk =

Ukrainian political activist (1925–2012)

- Микола Плав'юк
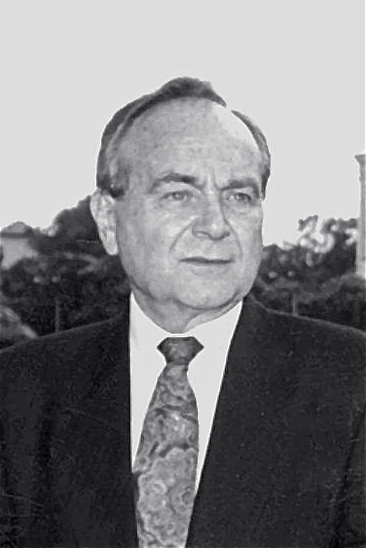
- Plaviuk in c. 2009

4th President of the Ukrainian People's Republic in exile
- In office 8 December 1989 – 22 August 1992
- Preceded by: Mykola Livytskyi
- Succeeded by: Leonid Kravchuk (domiciled)^{1}

4th President of the World Congress of Free Ukrainians
- In office 1978–1981
- Preceded by: Wasyl Kushnir
- Succeeded by: Ivan Bazarko

Leader of the Organization of Ukrainian Nationalists (Melnykites)
- In office 1981–2012
- Preceded by: Denys Kvitkovskyi
- Succeeded by: Bohdan Chervak

Personal details
- Born: 5 June 1925 Rusów, Poland (now Rusiv, Ivano-Frankivsk Oblast, Ukraine)
- Died: 10 March 2012 (aged 86) Hamilton, Ontario, Canada
- Party: Organization of Ukrainian Nationalists (Melnykites)
- Education: Ludwig-Maximilians-Universität München; Concordia University
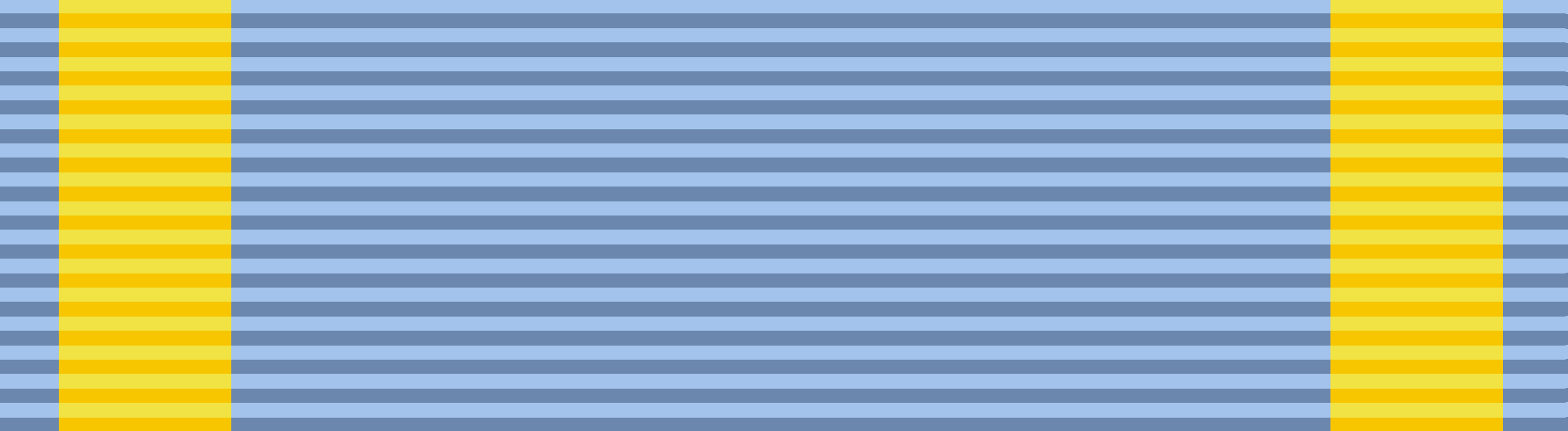
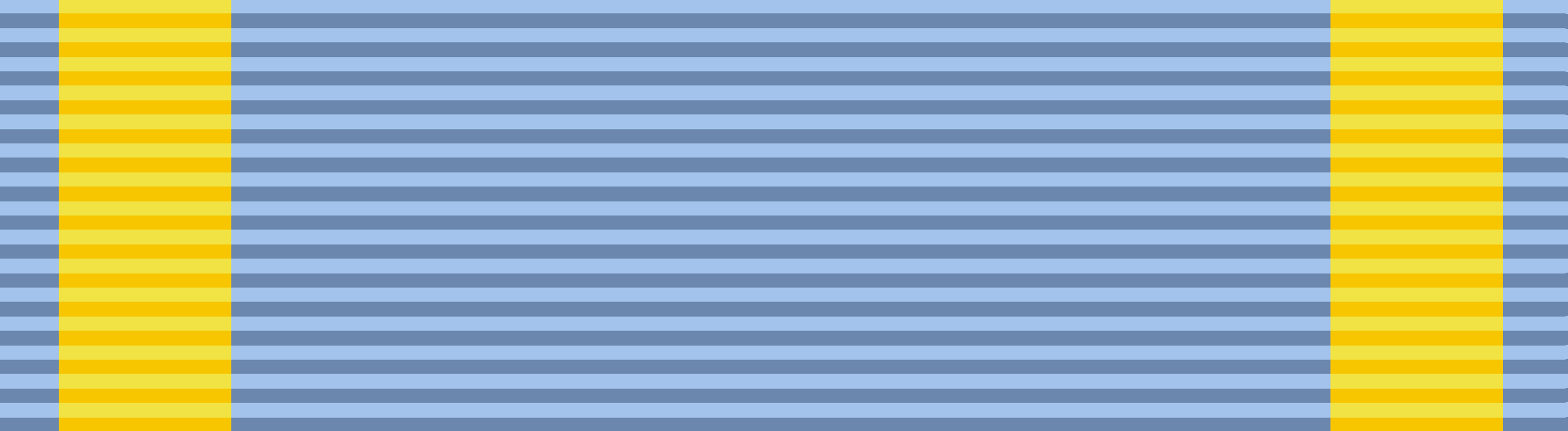
- Awards
- ^{1}Plaviuk terminated his authority as President of the Ukrainian People's Republic on 22 August 1992 when he formally ceded his authority to the first President of Ukraine Leonid Kravchuk.

Mykola Vasyliovych Plaviuk (Ukrainian: Микола Васильович Плав'юк; 5 June 1925 – 10 March 2012) was a Ukrainian social and political activist in emigration, who served as the last President of the Ukrainian People's Republic in exile. He terminated his authority on 22 August 1992, when he formally ceded his authority to the first President of independent Ukraine, Leonid Kravchuk.

== Early life and education ==
Mykola Plaviuk was born on 5 June 1925 in the village of Rusów in Poland (now Rusiv, Ivano-Frankivsk Oblast, in independent Ukraine). During World War II, Mykola became active in the Plast scouting movement in western Ukraine, which provided training after which many youths subsequently joined the Organization of Ukrainian Nationalists. After the war, he fled to Germany where he received a diploma from the Ludwig-Maximilians-Universität München in economics. He immigrated to Montreal in Canada in 1949 where he became an active member of the Ukrainian diaspora in Canada. In 1954 he graduated from Concordia University.

== Career ==
Prior to the proclamation of an independent Ukrainian state in 1991, parallel to his professional career, Mykola Plaviuk held prominent positions in Ukrainian diaspora community/political institutions: president of the Ukrainian National Federation of Canada (1956–66); vice-president of the Ukrainian Canadian Congress (1966–71); senior Plast Ukrainian scout leader; initiator and chief organizer responsible for the establishment in 1967 of the World Congress of Free Ukrainians (WCFU) in New York; secretary general of the WCFU (1973–76); 1st vice-president of the WCFU (1976–78); president of the WCFU (1978–81); elected leader of the Organization of Ukrainian Nationalists (Melnykite faction) in 1979; (Note: Due to the founding constitution of the WCFU, Plaviuk could only assume the leadership of the OUN-M once his term ended in 1981.) in June 1988 elected vice-president of the Ukrainian National Republic (UNR) in Exile.

After death of incumbent president Mykola Livytskyi, Plaviuk became his successor, serving from 8 December 1989 to 1992. During a ceremonious session of the Verkhovna Rada on 22 August 1992 in Kyiv, Mykola Plaviuk formally ceded his authority and the activity of the UNR to the first president of independent Ukraine, Leonid Kravchuk, who was elected in 1991. In his declaration, Plaviuk proclaimed that the current Ukrainian state is the lawful successor to the Ukrainian People's Republic and a continuation of its authority and state traditions. (Note: According to Ukrainian law current Ukraine is the successor state of the Ukrainian SSR that was part of the Soviet Union.)

For his achievements in Ukrainian community and political affairs in the diaspora, Mykola Plaviuk was awarded the St. Volodymyr the Great Medal by the Ukrainian World Congress, and the Taras Shevchenko Medal by the Ukrainian Canadian Congress. In 1993, via extraordinary decree by President of Ukraine Leonid Kravchuk, Mykola Plaviuk was made a citizen of Ukraine. In 1996, by presidential decree Ukrainian President Leonid Kuchma conferred upon Mykola Plaviuk the State Order of Merit, 3rd Class "…for his personal contribution to the development of Ukrainian statehood, and his active community and humanitarian involvement…."

In 2007, through presidential decree President of Ukraine Viktor Yushchenko conferred upon Mykola Plaviuk The Order of Prince Yaroslav the Wise, 1st Class for his contributions as a “…public and political leader, President of the UNR in exile 1988-1992, for his selfless service to the Ukrainian people, and distinguished personal achievements in the revival of Ukraine’s independence."

Mykola Plaviuk was the leader of the Organization of Ukrainian Nationalists from 1981 until his death.

== Personal life ==
He was married, and had two sons and two daughters. Plaviuk lived in both Kyiv and Canada. He died on 10 March 2012 in Hamilton, Ontario.

== See also ==
- List of leaders of Ukraine

== Notes ==
Political offices
Preceded by Mykola Livytskyi	President of Ukraine-in-exile; 1989–1992	Succeeded by Office abolished
Party political offices
Preceded by Wasyl Kushnir	President of the World Congress of Free Ukrainians; 1978–1981	Succeeded by Ivan Bazarko
Preceded by D. Kvitkovskyi	Leader of Organization of Ukrainian Nationalists; 1981–2012	Incumbent
