= Skoropadsky family =

Noble Ukrainian family

Skoropadskyi
- Noble family
- Skoropadskyi Coat of Arms
- Country: Cossack Hetmanate; Ukrainian State
- Current region: Canada; Ukraine
- Titles: Hetman of Zaporizhian Host; Hetman of Ukraine
- Members: Ivan Skoropadskyi; Pavlo Skoropadskyi; Danylo Skoropadskyi
- Traditions: Hetmanite movement

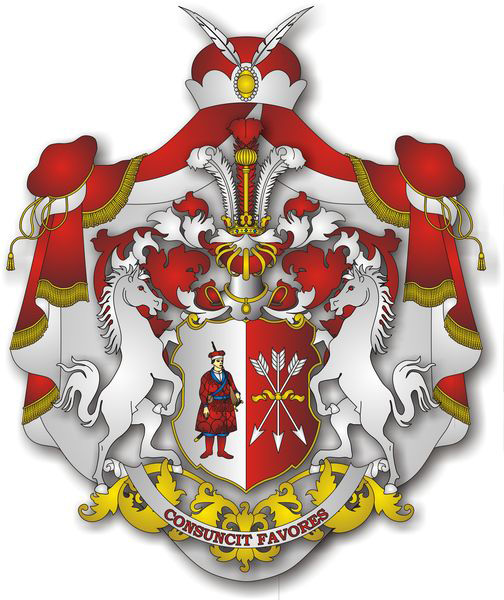
19th-century coat of arms of Skoropadsky family

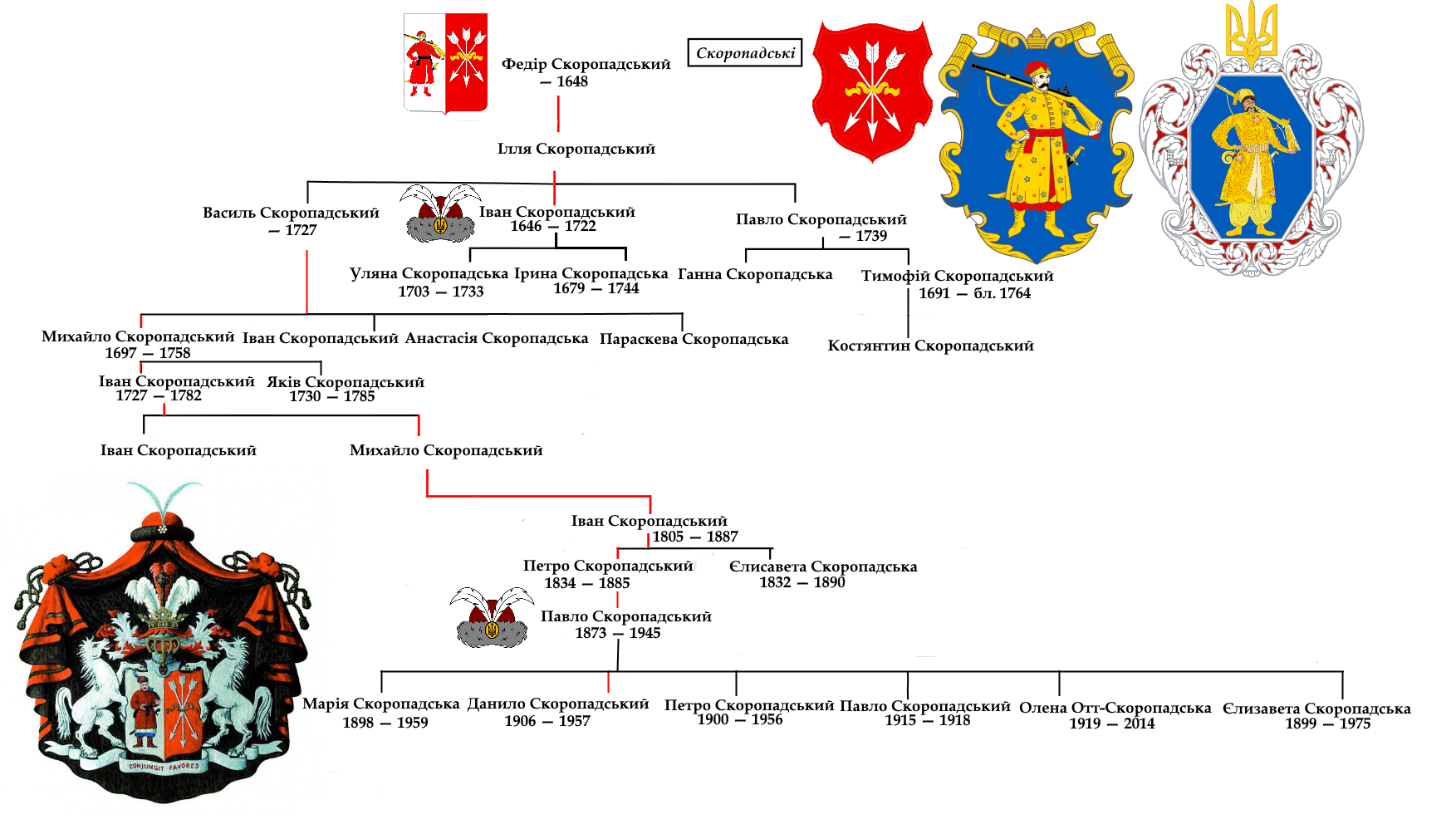
Family tree

The House of Skoropadskyi (Ukrainian: Скоропадські) is a noble Ukrainian family of Cossack origin.

== Notable members ==
- Fedir Skoropadsky (died 1648)
  - Illya Skoropadsky (? - ?), Referendarium General of Right-bank Ukraine, father of Ivan.
    - Ivan Skoropadsky (1646 – September 3, 1722; reigned 1708–1722), Hetman of Zaporizhian Host, succeeded the deposed Hetman Ivan Mazepa after his defection to the Swedes during the Great Northern War.
      - Iryna Skoropadska (1679-1744) - daughter of Ivan Skoropadsky from first marriage
      - Uliana Skoropadska (1703-1733) - daughter of Ivan Skoropadsky and Anastasia Markovych
    - Vasyl Skoropadsky (? – 1727), brother of Ivan Skoropadsky. Bunchuk General.
      - Mykhailo Skoropadsky (1697 — 1758), son of Vasyl Skoropadsky. Treasurer General.
        - Ivan Skoropadsky (1727 — 1782), son of Mykhailo Skoropadsky. Last Adjutant General.
          - Ivan Skoropadsky, son of Ivan
          - Mykhailo Skoropadsky, son of Ivan
            - Ivan Skoropadsky (1805 - 1887), great grandson of Treasurer General Mykhailo Skoropadsky and grandfather of Hetman Pavlo Skoropadsky. Provincial Marshal of the Poltavian Nobility. Father of Yelyzaveta Myloradovych.
              - Yelyzaveta Myloradovych (née Skoropadska, 1832-1890), Ukrainian philanthropist
              - Petro Skoropadsky (1834-1885), father of Pavlo Skoropadsky
                - Pavlo Skoropadsky (1873–1945), Lieutenant General in the Imperial Russian Army, member of Emperor Nicholas II's svita, briefly Hetman of Ukraine in 1918. Dethroned and expelled from the country by Symon Petliura. Claimant (1919–1945) to the post of Hetman. Died in exile in Nazi Germany in 1945. Married to Oleksandra Skoropadska (née Durnovo, 1878 – 1952).
                  - Maria Skoropadska (1898-1959)
                  - Yelyzaveta Skoropadska (1899-1975)
                  - Petro Skoropadsky (1900-1956)
                  - Danylo Skoropadsky (1904–1957), son of Pavlo, claimant to the Hetmanate (1945–1957). Died in London under mysterious circumstances.
                  - Pavlo Skoropadsky (1915-1918)
                  - Olena Skoropadska-Ott (1919-2014)
        - Yakiv Skoropadsky (1730-1785), younger son of Mykhailo
      - Ivan Skoropadsky, son of Vasyl
      - Anastasia Skoropadska, daughter of Vasyl
      - Paraskeva Skoropadska, daughter of Vasyl
    - Pavlo Skoropadsky (died 1739) - younger son of Illya Skoropadsky
      - Hanna Skoropadska, daughter of Pavlo
      - Tymofiy Skoropadsky (1691 - c.1764), son of Pavlo
        - Kostiantyn Skoropadsky, son of Tymofiy

== Other bearers of the surname ==
- Artem Skoropadskyi (1981-2022) - Ukrainian journalist
- Georgiy Skoropadsky (1873 - 1925), deputy of State Duma of the Russian Empire.

== Gallery ==
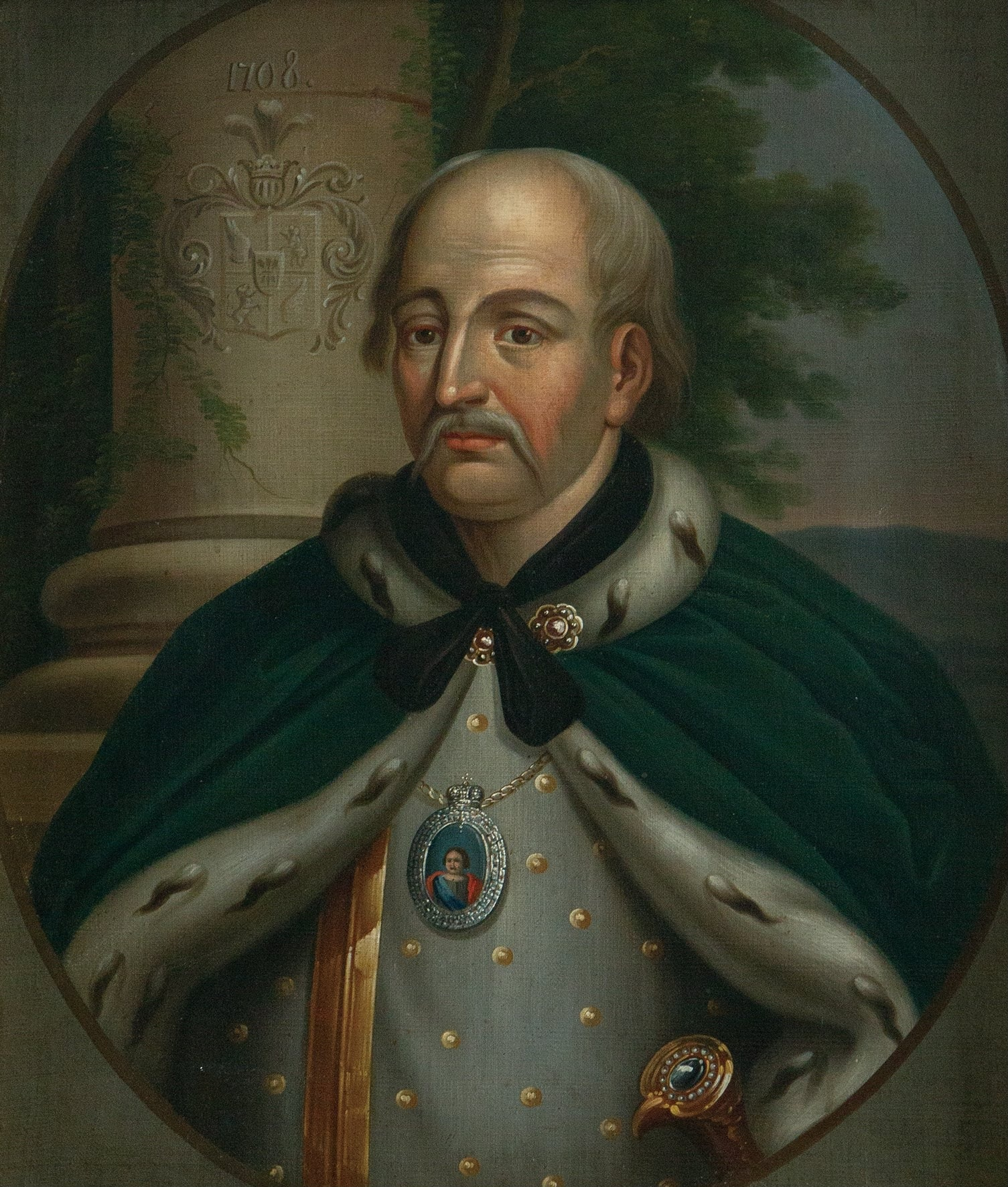
Ivan Skoropadsky (Hetman in 1708–1722)

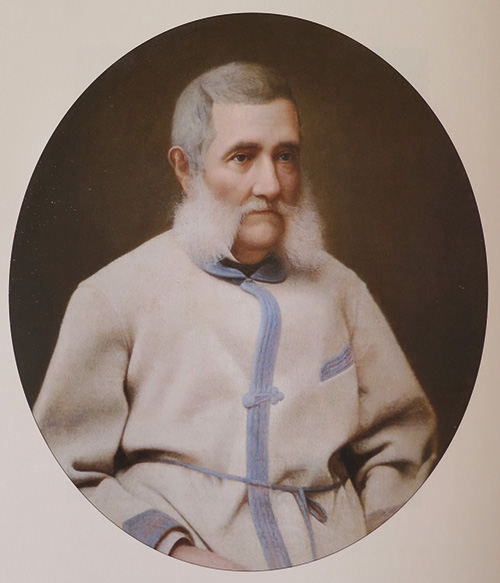
Ivan Skoropadsky (1805-1887)

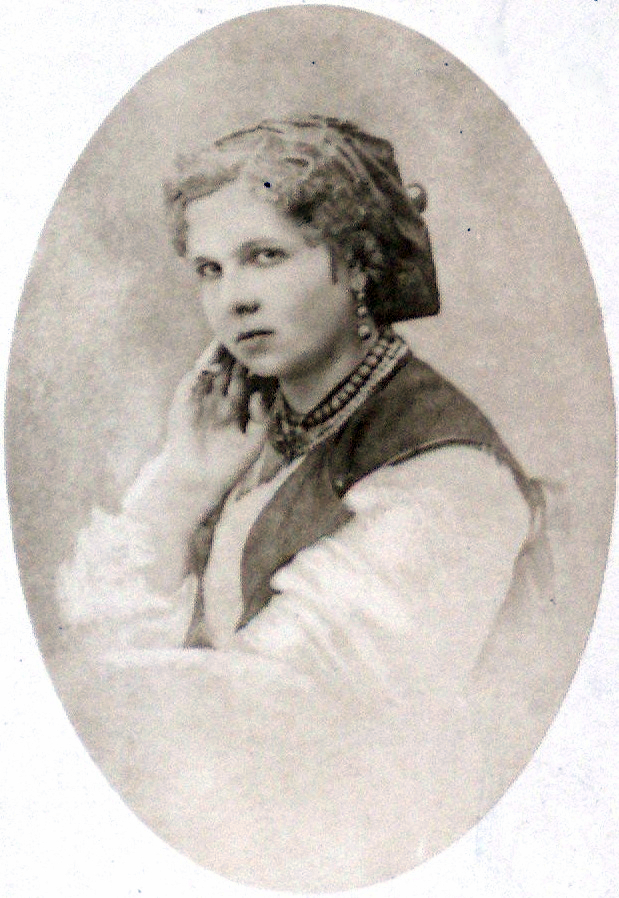
Yelyzaveta Myloradovych (Skoropadska)

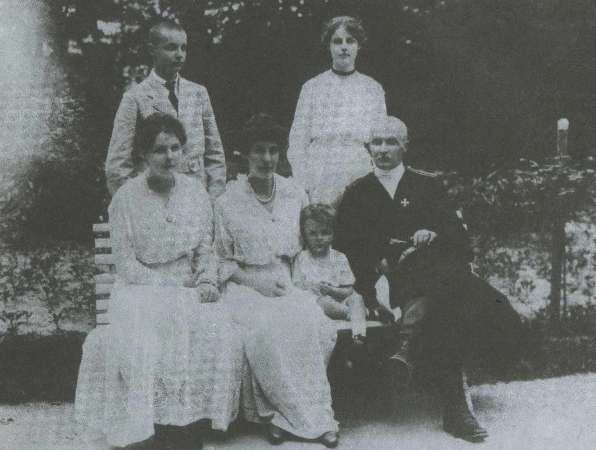
Pavlo Skoropadsky with his family in 1920

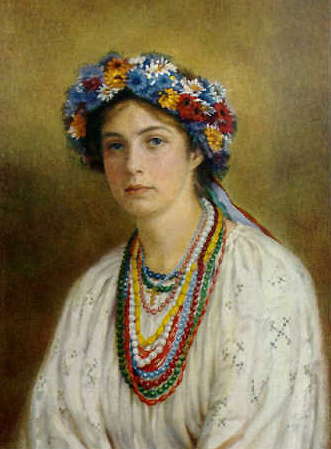
Yelyzaveta Skoropadska

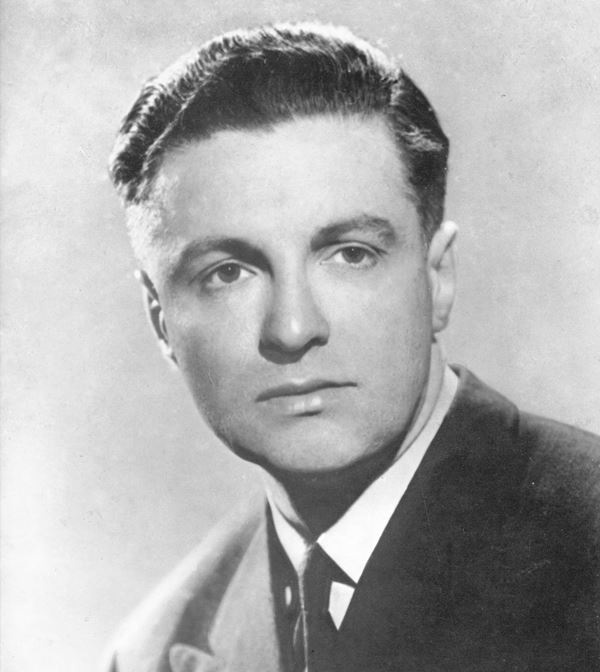
Danylo Skoropadsky

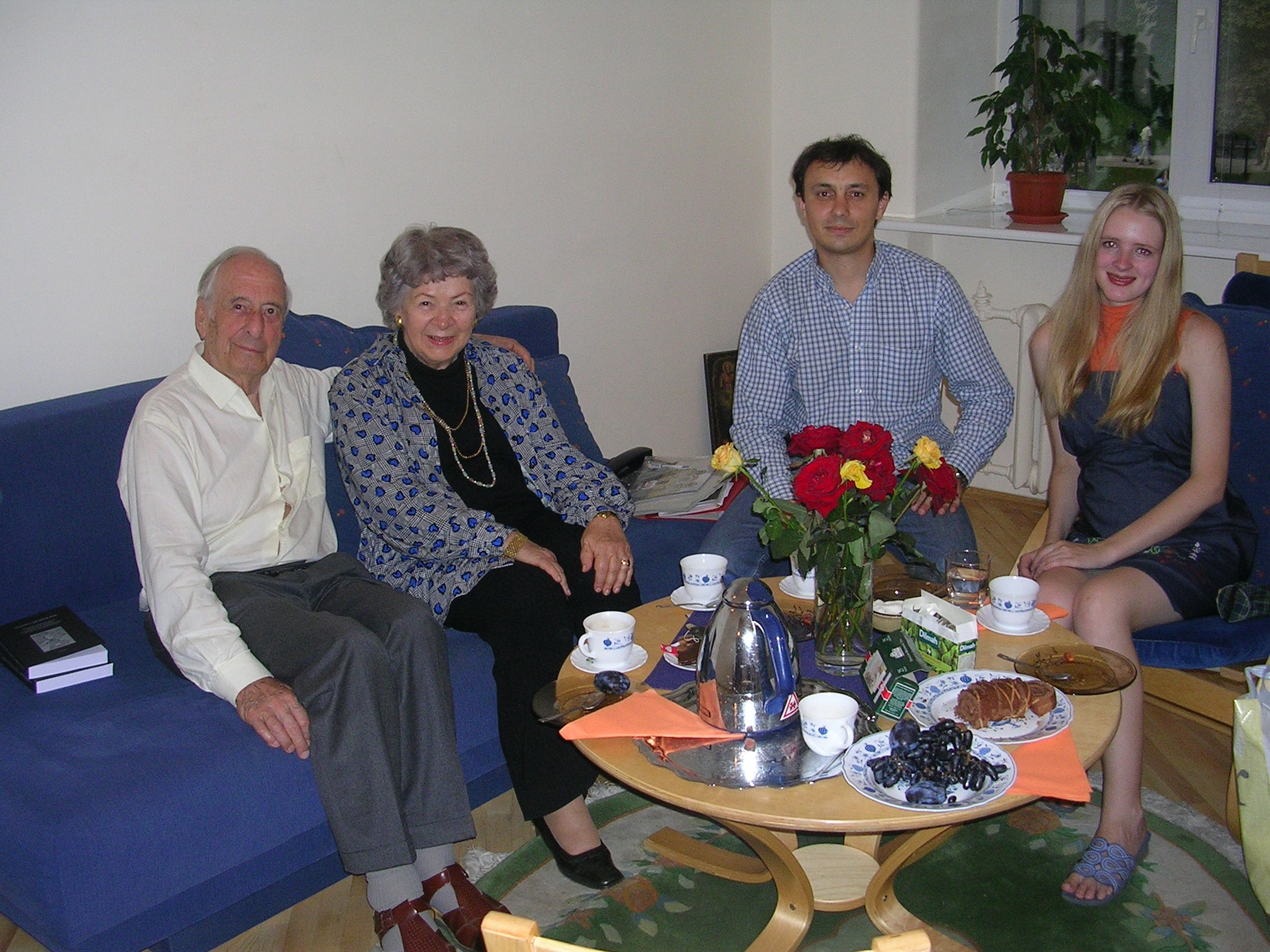
Olena Skoropadska-Ott (2nd from left)
