= Olena Lytovchenko =

Ukrainian writer (1963–2021)

Olena Oleksiivna Lytovchenko
- Олена Олексіївна Литовченко
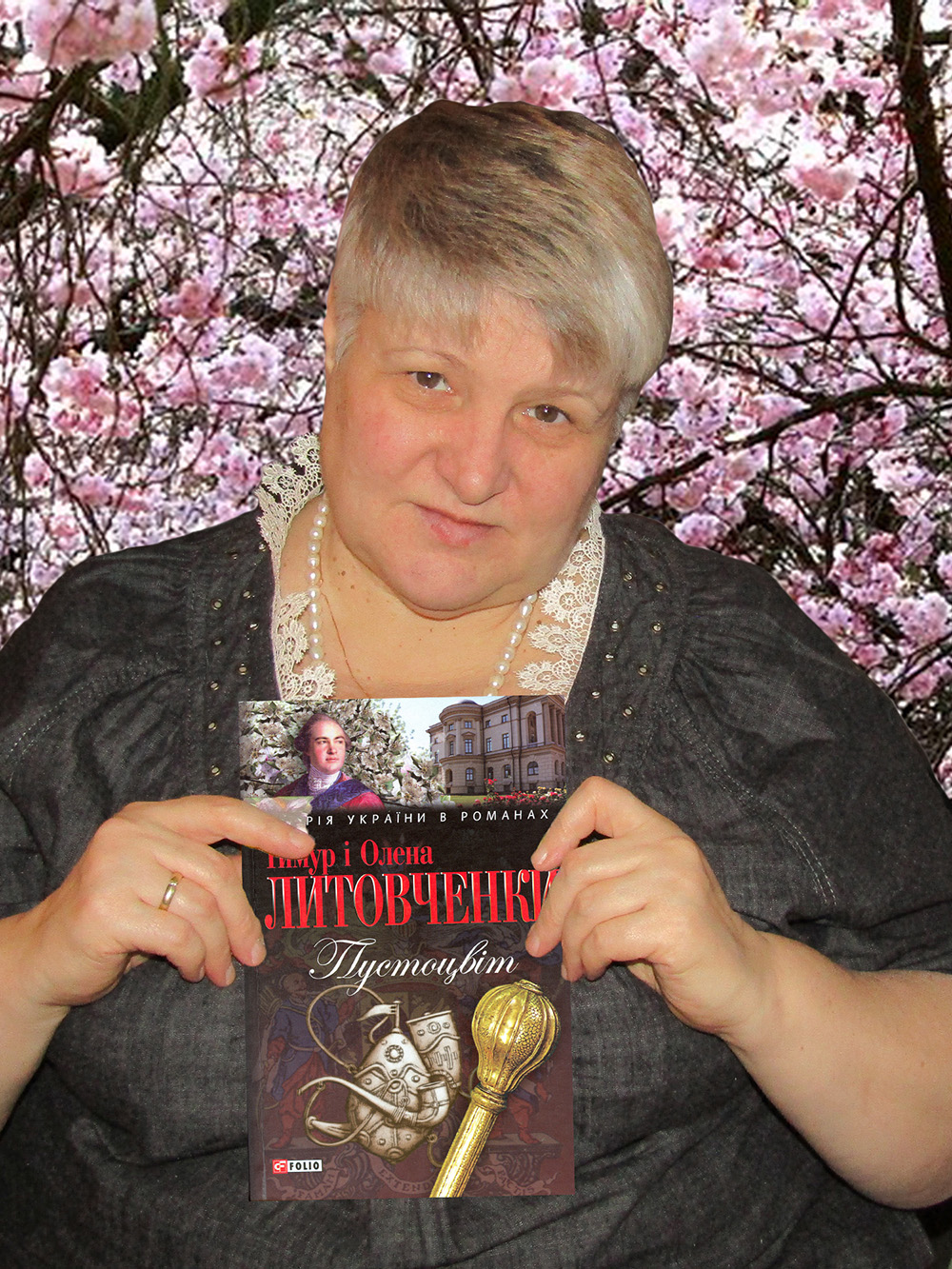
- Born: May 1, 1963; Tashkent, Uzbek SSR, Soviet Union
- Died: October 28, 2021 (aged 58); Kyiv, Ukraine
- Occupation: Writer
- Spouse: Timur Ivanovich Lytovchenko (1963–2021)
- Children: Daughter Ludmila (1985)
- Writing career
- Years active: Since 2011
- Notable awards: Vasil Yuhimovitch Literary Prize (2016), Panteleimon Kulish International Literary Arts Prize (2018), Ivan Mazepa Medal (2021)

Olena Oleksiivna Lytovchenko (1 May 1963 – 28 October 2021) was a Ukrainian writer and a metallurgical engineer by education.

She wrote and co-authored with her husband Timur Litovchenko adventures, historical fiction, and detective fiction which books were published in Ukraine.

== Biography ==
Olena Oleksiivna Litovchenko was born on May 1, 1963, in Tashkent. Her father was a pilot and worked as a flight engineer in transport aviation. Until coming of age, she roamed not only in Ukraine, but also in Russia (Tyumen, Kurgan).

In 1980, she completed her secondary education. In 1986, she graduated from Igor Sikorsky Kyiv Polytechnic Institute's department of engineering and physics with a degree in metallurgical engineering. While studying there she met her future husband and co-author Timur.

Lytovchenko died on 28 October 2021, of COVID-19. She was 58.

== Personal life ==
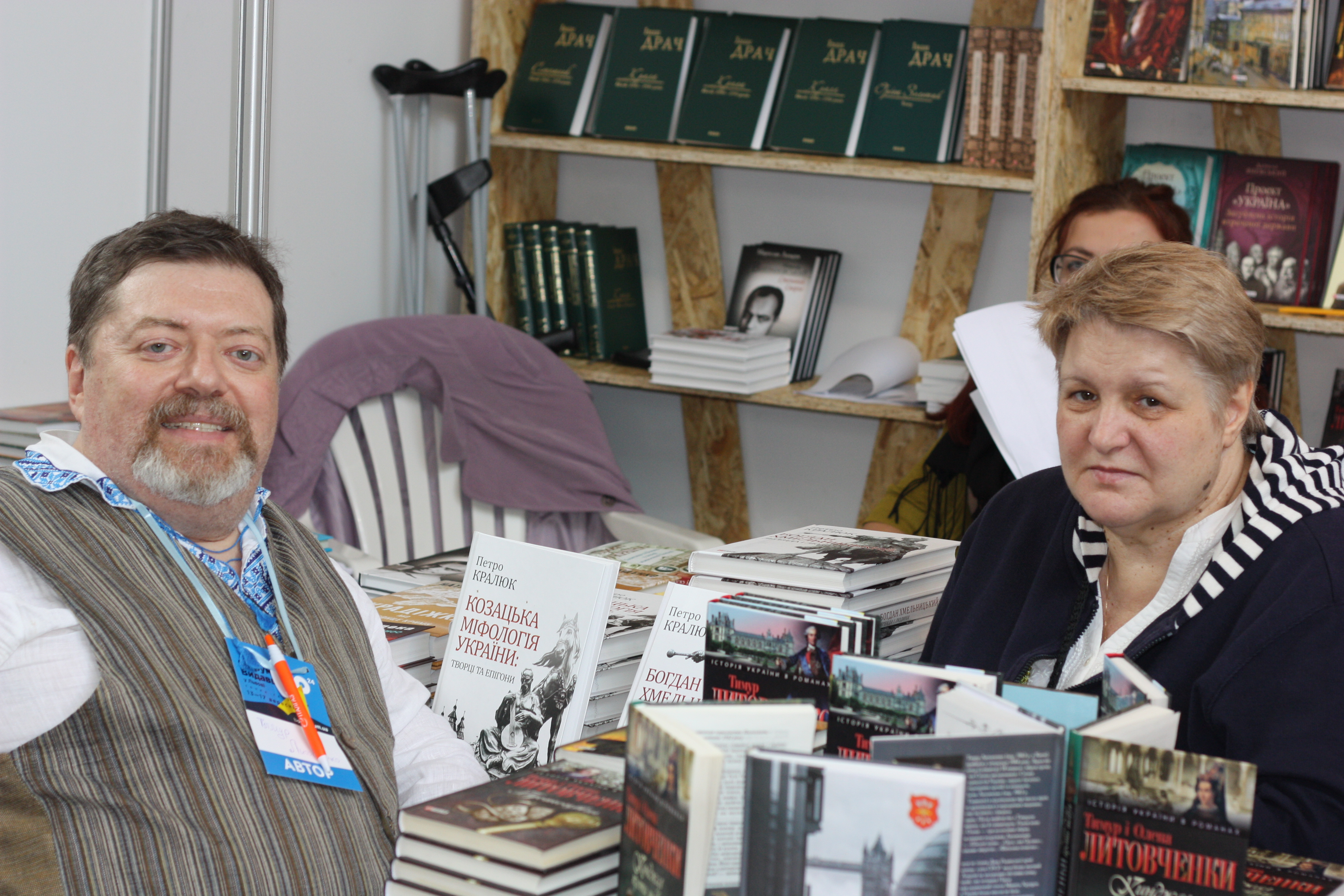
Olena with her husband Timur at Book Forum Lviv, 2017.

Olena's husband Timur Litovchenko was born in 1963 in Kyiv, and they were married in 1984. She coauthored literary works with him since 2011. They have one daughter Ludmila who was born in 1985. Her father is from Motovylivka and her mother is from the Wuhanski noble family, who lived in the present-day Gmina Uchanie of Hrubieszów County, in Lublin Voivodeship, eastern Poland.

== Literary career ==
As a teenager, a number of poems by Olena Lytovchenko were published in the Periodical Press of Kurgan, Russia. During her studies at KPI and after that she sometimes wrote short stories in the genre of fantasy. A completely new stage began in 2011, when Olena and her husband Timur Litovchenko began to write historical prose together. The novels of the creative Litovchenko couple were published by the Folio Publishing House of Kharkiv.

Olena Lytovchenko also created a series of stories about pets in the family reading genre, one of which was included in the collection "Druzi nezradlyvi" (winners of the contest "Mi-mi-mi. Our favorites"), which was published by Staryi Lev Publishing House. (Note: Old Lion Publishing House)

From 2018 to 2021, the Litovchenko couple had the miniseries "101 Years of Ukraine" published by the Folio Publishing House of Kharkiv. In 2018, the first four books in the series were printed. In 2019, three more novels were published. In 2020, two more books were published. Their last book was published in 2021.

== Honors ==
- 2011 - Nomination for the Prize of the President of Ukraine "Ukrainian Book of the Year."
- 2012 – Special Award "Publishers' Choice" at the All-Ukrainian Literary Competition "Coronation of the Word 2012" (together with her husband, Timur Litovchenko).
- 2012 – All-Ukrainian Literary and Artistic Festival "Prosto na Pokrovu" (Korosten) – diploma "Gyenyu Svyata."
- 2012 – Nomination for the BBC Book of the Year Award.
- 2012 – Nomination for the Prize of the President of Ukraine "Ukrainian Book of the Year."
- 2013 – All-Ukrainian Literary Competition named after Alexandra Kravchenko, 2nd place (with Timur Litovchenko) for the novel about Kirill Razumovski "Pustotsvit."
- 2014 – Nomination for the BBC Book of the Year Award.
- 2014 – Nomination for the Prize of the President of Ukraine "Ukrainian Book of the Year."
- 2016 – Literary award "Golden Writer of Ukraine" (special award of the International Literary Competition "Coronation of the Word 2016") and the "Sword of the Word" (with Timur Litovchenko).
- 2016 – Vasyl Yukhymovich Prize for the prose book "Fatalʹna pomylka" (with Timur Litovchenko).
- 2017 – Diploma at the International Literary Competition "Coronation of the Word 2017" for the book "Prince of Ukraine" (with Timur Litovchenko).
- 2018 – Panteleimon Kulish Prize (together with Timur Litovchenko) "for historical novels."
- 2018 – The work of Timur and Olena Litovchenko "Knyha Zhakhittya. 1932–1938," published by Folio Publishing House, won the Best Book of Ukraine competition in the My Country category, according to the State Committee for Television and Radio-broadcasting (Ukraine).
- 2019 – Diploma of the All-Ukrainian literary competition of prose Ukrainian-language publications "Dnipro-Book-Fest-2019" (with Timur Litovchenko) in the nomination "Prose works (novels, short stories)" for the book "Prince of Ukraine" about Danylo Skoropadskyi, son of Hetman of Ukraine Pavlo Skoropadskyi.

== Published works ==
=== Ukrainian ===
- Пустоцвіт//Серія «Історія України в романах» — Харків: Фоліо. 2012. — 378 с. ISBN 978-966-03-5144-8 (Note: This is the first work written in collaboration with her husband Timur Litovchenko.)
  - (in English) Pustotsvit//Series "The History of Ukraine in Novels," Kharkiv: Folio. 2012. – 378 p. ISBN 978-966-03-5144-8
- Пустоцвіт (роман). — Київ: Гетьман, 2013. — 376 с. ISBN 978-966-2506-07-5
  - (in English) Pustotsvit (novel). — Kyiv: Hetman, 2013. — 376 p. ISBN 978-966-2506-07-5
- Кинджал проти шаблі//Серія «Історія України в романах» — Харків: Фоліо. 2012. — 315 с. ISBN 978-966-03-6975-7
  - (in English) Kindzhal proti shabli//Series «The History of Ukraine in Novels» — Kharkiv: Folio. 2012. — 315 p. ISBN 978-966-03-6975-7
- Кинджал проти шаблі (роман). — Харків: Гімназія, 2013. — 313 с. ISBN 978-966-474-193-1
  - (in English) Kindzhal proti shabli (novel). — Kharkiv: Himnaziya, 2013. — 313 p. ISBN 978-966-474-193-1
- Невиправдана зрада (повість)//В зб .: Історія України очима письменників. — Харків: Фоліо. 2013. — 510 с. ISBN 978-966-03-6582-7 (сс.28–85)
  - (in English) Nevipravdana zrada (povist) in the collection: History of Ukraine through the eyes of writers. — Kharkiv: Folio. 2013. — 510 p. ISBN 978-966-03-6582-7 (сс.28–85)
- Шалені шахи//Серія «Історія України в романах» — Харків: Фоліо. 2014. — 314 с. ISBN 978-966-03-6975-7
  - (in English) Shaleni shakhy//Series «The History of Ukraine in Novels» — Kharkiv: Folio. 2014. — 314 p. ISBN 978-966-03-6975-7
- Забути неможливо зберегти Детектив/Бойовик/Трилер. — Харків: Фоліо. 2014. — 217 с. ISBN 978-966-03-7029-6
  - (in English) Zabuty nemozhlyvo zberehty Detective/Action/Thriller. — Kharkiv: Folio. 2014. — 217 p. ISBN 978-966-03-7029-6
- Мрійник (повість)//В зб .: Україна — Європа. — Харків: Фоліо. 2014. — 573 с. ISBN 978-966-03-7026-5 (сс.275–307)
  - (in English) Mriynyk (povistʹ)//in the collection: Ukraine — Europe. — Kharkiv: Folio. 2014. — 573 p. ISBN 978-966-03-7026-5 (сс.275–307)
- Фатальна помилка//Серія «Історія України в романах» — Харків: Фоліо. 2015. — 319 с. ISBN 978-966-03-7213-9
  - (in English) Fatalʹna pomylka // Series «The History of Ukraine in Novels» — Kharkiv: Folio. 2015. — 319 p. ISBN 978-966-03-7213-9
- Фатальна помилка (авантюрно-історичний роман) — Харків: Факт, 2015. — 317 c. ISBN 978-966-637-796-1
  - (in English) Fatalʹna pomylka (adventure-historical novel) — Kharkiv: Fact, 2015. — 317 p. ISBN 978-966-637-796-1
- Наш подільський дворик (цикл оповідань)//В зб .: Усмішка.//Серія «Добрі історії» — Харків: Фоліо. 2015. — 160 с. ISBN 978-966-03-7375-4
  - (in English) Nash podilʹsʹkyy dvoryk (tsykl opovidanʹ)//in the collection: Usmishka.//Series «Good stories» — Kharkiv: Folio. 2015. — 160 p. ISBN 978-966-03-7375-4
- Принц України (історичний детектив) — Харків: Фоліо. 2017. — 320 с. ISBN 978-966-03-7805-6
  - (in English) Prince of Ukraine (historical detective) — Kharkiv: Folio. 2017. — 320 p. ISBN 978-966-03-7805-6
- Книга Пожежі. 1914—1922//Серія «101 рік України» — Харків: Фоліо. 2018. — 256 с. ISBN 978-966-03-8183-4
  - (in English) Knyha Pozhezhi. 1914—1922//Series «101 Years of Ukraine» — Kharkiv: Folio. 2018. — 256 p. ISBN 978-966-03-8183-4
- Книга Невиправданих Надій. 1923—1931//Серія «101 рік України» — Харків: Фоліо. 2018. — 272 с. ISBN 978-966-03-8189-6
  - (in English) Knyha Nevypravdanykh Nadiy. 1923—1931//Series «101 Years of Ukraine» — Kharkiv: Folio. 2018. — 272 p. ISBN 978-966-03-8189-6
- Книга Жахіття. 1932—1938//Серія «101 рік України» — Харків: Фоліо. 2018. — 204 с. ISBN 978-966-03-8188-9
  - (in English) Knyha Zhakhittya. 1932—1938//Series «101 Years of Ukraine» — Kharkiv: Folio. 2018. — 204 p. ISBN 978-966-03-8188-9
- Книга Спустошення. 1939—1945//Серія «101 рік України» — Харків: Фоліо. 2018. — 224 с. ISBN 978-966-03-8190-2
  - (in English) Knyha Spustoshennya. 1939—1945//Series «101 Years of Ukraine» — Kharkiv: Folio. 2018. — 224 p. ISBN 978-966-03-8190-2
- Книга Зневіри. 1946—1953//Серія «101 рік України» — Харків: Фоліо. 2019. — 256 с. ISBN 978-966-03-8511-5
  - (in English) Knyha Zneviry. 1946—1953//Series «101 Years of Ukraine» — Kharkiv: Folio. 2019. — 256 p. ISBN 978-966-03-8511-5
- Книга Відлиги. (1954–1964)//Серія «101 рік України» — Харків: Фоліо. 2019. — 352 с. ISBN 978-966-03-8512-2
  - (in English) Knyha Vidlyhy. (1954–1964)//Series «101 Years of Ukraine» — Kharkiv: Folio. 2019. — 352 p. ISBN 978-966-03-8512-2
- Книга Застою. (1965–1976)//Серія «101 рік України» — Харків: Фоліо. 2019. — 384 с. ISBN 978-966-03-8659-4
  - (in English) Knyha Zastoyu. (1965–1976)//Series «101 Years of Ukraine» — Kharkiv: Folio. 2019. — 384 p. ISBN 978-966-03-8659-4
- Книга Розчарування. (1977–1990)//Серія «101 рік України» — Харків: Фоліо. 2020. — 480 с. ISBN 978-966-03-9233-5
  - (in English) Knyha Rozcharuvannya. (1977–1990)//Series «101 Years of Ukraine» — Kharkiv: Folio. 2020. — 480 p. ISBN 978-966-03-9233-5
- Книга Нових Сподівань. (2005–2014)//Серія «101 рік України» — Харків: Фоліо. 2020. — 416 с. ISBN 978-966-03-9468-1
  - (in English) Knyha Novykh Spodivanʹ. (2005–2014)//Series «101 Years of Ukraine» — Kharkiv: Folio. 2020. — 416 p. ISBN 978-966-03-9468-1
- Книга Безнадії. (1991–2004)//Серія «101 рік України» — Харків: Фоліо. 2021. — 640 с. ISBN 978-966-03-9535-0
  - (in English) Knyha Beznadiyi. (1991–2004)//Series «101 Years of Ukraine» — Kharkiv: Folio. 2021. — 640 p. ISBN 978-966-03-9535-0

== Sources ==
- Modern Ukrainian Book Sphere | Olena Lytovchenko
