= Vyacheslav Lypynsky =

Ukrainian historian, activist, and political theorist (1882–1931)

- В'ячеслав Липинський
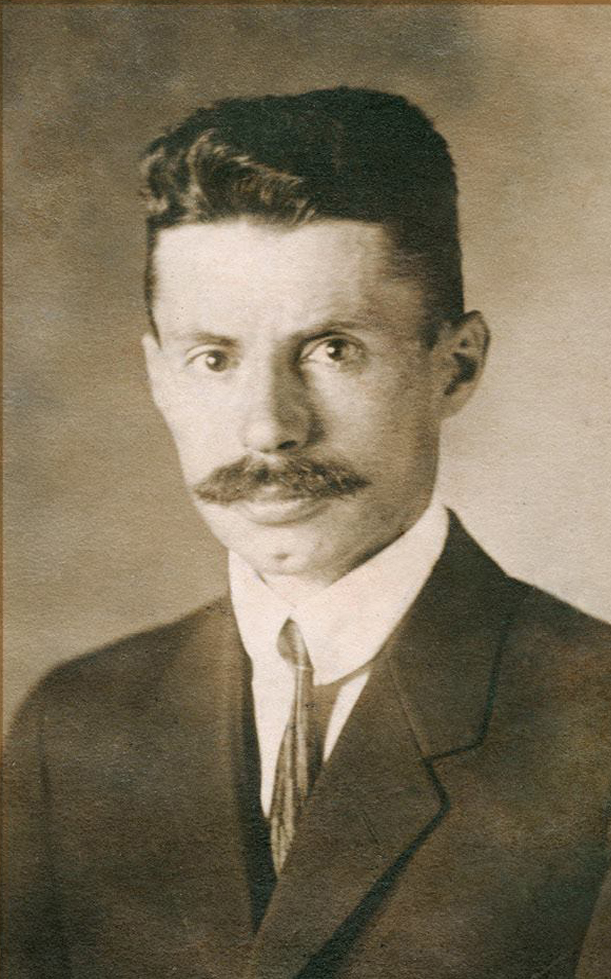
- Lypynsky in 1921
- Born: Wacław Wicenty Lipiński; 5 April 1882; Zaturtsi, Russian Empire (now Ukraine)
- Died: 14 June 1931 (aged 49); Pernitz, First Austrian Republic

Academic background
- Education: Jagiellonian University (did not graduate); University of Geneva (dropped out)
- Influences: Georges Sorel, Vilfredo Pareto, Gustave Le Bon, Charles Maurras

Academic work
- Language: Ukrainian, Polish
- Notable ideas: Ukrainian conservatism, Hetmanite movement
- Influenced: Pavlo Skoropadskyi, Dmytro Doroshenko

Signature
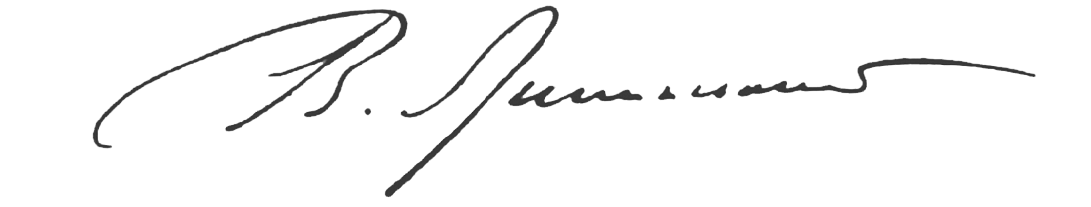

Vyacheslav (Viacheslav) Kazymyrovych Lypynsky (Note: Ukrainian: В'ячеслав Казимирович Липинський; Polish: Wacław Lipiński) (5 April 1882 — 14 June 1931) was a Ukrainian historian, social and political activist, known as a leading ideologue of Ukrainian conservatism. Born to a Catholic Polish noble family in Volhynia, he adopted a Ukrainian identity in his youth and became one of the prominent leaders of the Ukrainian national movement. During the Ukrainian Revolution of 1917, he became the founder of the Ukrainian Democratic–Agrarian Party. Under the government of Hetmanate, Lypynsky served as the Ukrainian ambassador to Austria. After the defeat of Ukrainian struggle for independence, he stayed in emigration and took leading positions in the Hetmanite movement, promoting the establishment of a Ukrainian monarchy.

== Biography ==
=== Family lineage ===
The Brodzic coat of arms Lypynsky used during his lifetime

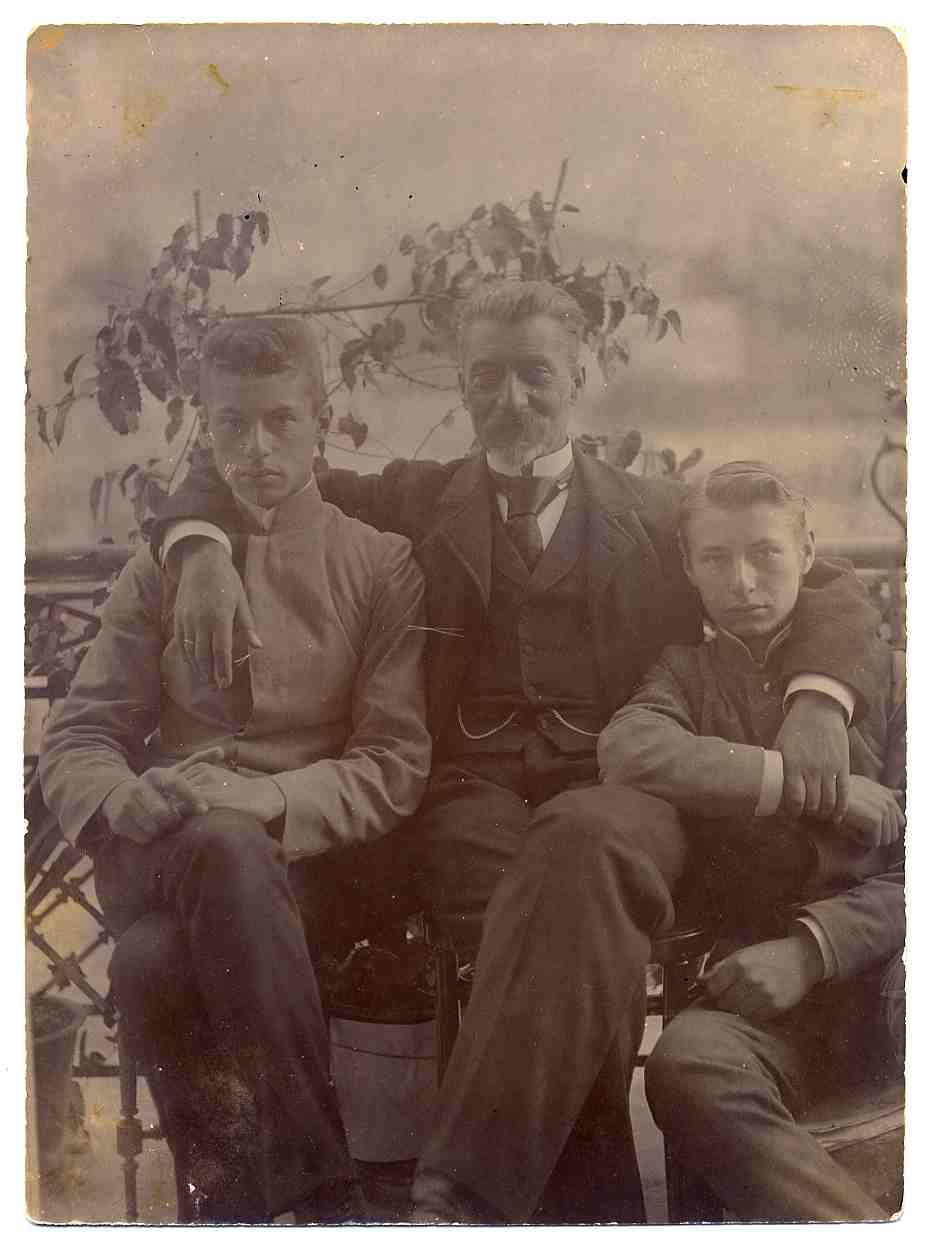
Vyacheslav (on the left) with his father Kazimir and one of his brothers, Stanislav, sometime during the late 1800s.

The Polish noble Lypynsky family, also transliterated as Lipiński, is of Mazovian origin, coming from the settlement of Lipiny in the Nur Land of the Duchy of Masovia - or the Nurska land "de Antiqua Lipiny". At the beginning of the 18th century, one branch of the family permanently settled in Podolia after Kazimierz-Józef Lipiński purchased the village of Teremkivtsi in 1759. Józef-Antoni then became stolnik of Drohiczyn and sub-steward of the Cherkasy Land. His son, Antoni, was the owner of Yampolchyk, the subchamberlain of Kamianets, and an elected district marshal of the nobility.

The family's connection to Zaturtsi stemmed from the marriage of Emilia Bechkowska to Włodzimierz-Severyn-Marian Lipiński in 1839. Bechkowska gave the village of Zaturtsi as her dowry.

=== Early life ===
Lypynsky was born on 17 April [O.S. 5 April] 1882 in the village of Zaturtsi, then part of the Vladimir-Volynsky Uyezd of the Volhynia Governorate in the Russian Empire (now in Volyn Oblast, Ukraine). (Note: His nephew stated that he was instead born in the village of Ratniv, as his brother Stanislav was, which was part of the Volhynia Governorate also but in the Lutsky Uyezd. However, it is generally accepted that he was born at Zaturtsi instead of Ratniv.) He was baptized by the name Wacław‑Wikenty Lipiński. He was the firstborn son of Kazimir Lypynsky and Klara Rokicka, both of whom were Roman Catholics. His father, Kazimir, was the lord of Zaturtsi and a participant in the Russo-Turkish War (1877–1878), retiring as a staff captain. In 1881, he married Klara Rokicka, of the Rogala coat of arms Apolinary Rokick, who was the Lord of Chernivtsi (a small village in Podolia). Vyacheslav later had three more siblings: Stanislav (born 1884), Wlodzimierz (born 1887), and Vanda-Yulianna (born 1891).

According to Lypynsky, his first language was Ukrainian, but the family spoke Polish or French at home. As he later wrote, Ukrainian was his first language because his nanny, a peasant, "did not know Polish", and although he was "a Pole in terms of spoken language and religion, and a Russophile in the political views inherited from home", the imagery of Ukrainian culture, such as the Zaporozhian Cossacks, drew him in. As a young boy, he was significantly influenced by his uncle, Adam Apollonariyovych Rokytsky, who was a landowner. According to a researcher, L. Bilas, Rokytsky shaped his viewpoint into Ukrainian nationalism.

Until the age of 11, he homeschooled with a private tutor, a French governess, but passed entrance examinations to attend a gymnasium on 21 August 1893. He was first enrolled in the second section of the first class of the First Zhytomyr Gymnasium, where he stayed until 15 August 1898, completing 4 classes there. He was noted for his excellent grades there and was also a pupil of future pianist Józef Turczyński. Upon completing his fourth class, his parents switched him to the Lutsk Ukrainian Gymnasium, presumably due to his poor health, where he studied for another two years until 15 May 1900.

He then received a leaving certificate to go to the First Kyiv Gymnasium, which he studied at for another two years until 1 June 1902, where he predominantly studied languages, especially Latin and Ancient Greek. According to multiple sources, the First Kyiv Gymnasium is where he began to further his views on Ukraine, which were grounded by territorial principles and not class-based or an ethnic identity. He was part of the so-called circle of Mariia Trebinska, which had formed in Kyiv in the 1890s. The circle involved many people, some intelligentsia, but mainly gathered for their "love for Ukraine". He had joined the circle probably in the autumn of 1900, and was mainly impressed by Mykola Vasylenko, a historian who extensively talked about Ukrainian history and territorial principles at the meetings. Among other associates of the circle were Volodymyr Naumenko, Klyment Kvitka and Izydora Kosach-Borysova. In May 1902, he passed his examinations to obtain his certificate of maturity.

=== Military service and university years ===
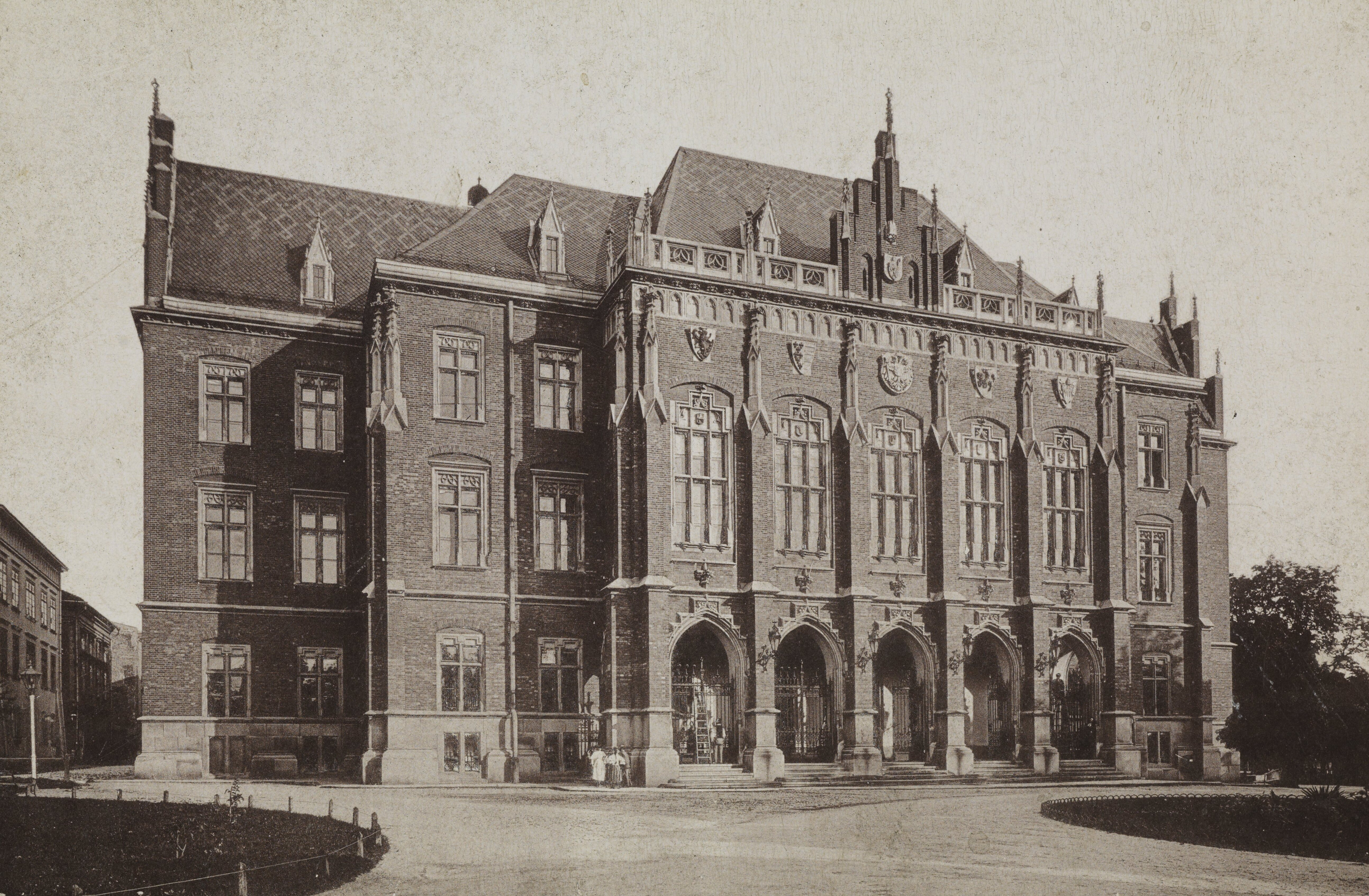
Lypynsky attended Jagiellonian University (pictured here in 1900) for agronomy.

Immediately upon graduating from the gymnasium, he enlisted in the 31st Riga Dragoon Regiment, a cavalry regiment of the Imperial Russian Army stationed in Kremenets, Kremenetsky Uyezd. He was enlisted as a one-year volunteer (вольноопределяющийся), who, after the implementation of conscription were people with higher or secondary education who voluntarily entered military service without being enrolled due to the conscription (but in practice were mostly wealthy young men who were landowners). They thus would be allowed a shorter duration of service, and after an examination would receive the rank of reserve officer at the end of the one-year period. It has been hypothesized that being stationed at Kremenets probably influenced his later choice to study in Austria-Hungary instead of the Russian Empire, as the city was located on the border and he intermingled with many Austro-Hungarians during his military stint. He completed his service in August 1903 as an ensign of the army cavalry reserve.

In the autumn of 1903, after finishing his military service, he enrolled at Jagiellonian University in agronomy, which was then located in the Austro-Hungarian Empire. This was probably due to the family tradition of agricultural production at their estate in Zaturtsi. At the university, he was greatly influenced by W.L. Jaworski, a politician and professor who was a member of the Stańczycy or the West Galician conservative movement that published the Czas, whom he would recall taught him "the fundamentals of law and political thinking". Perhaps most influential to him during this time, however, was Bohdan Lepky. After overhearing a lecture by Lepky, he decided to enroll in the Ukrainian language study circle and began to cultivate a relationship with him, where they spoke extensively about a Ukrainian national idea. Lepsky also introduced him to the Ukrainian student community, the Prosvita society, and Ukrainian historian Stepan Tomashivskyi, who pushed him into the field of history.

He left the study of agronomy in 1905 after two years, but did not graduate because he did not complete the required promotion exams. There is a brief one-year period afterwords during which his activities were unknown and not documented, although his sister Vanda maintained that he was studying history in Krakow. Either way, perhaps motivated by the revolutions occurring at the time against the Imperial Russian government, in the autumn of 1906 he moved to Geneva and began courses in the Faculty of Letters and Social Sciences at the University of Geneva. However, after only one academic year, he returned to Kraków after falling ill due to the Alpine winds, causing him to have "pleurisy with fluid." Thus, he went to the Polish sanatorium at Villa Jerzewo in Zakopane for half a year of recovery. During this time, he interacted closely with historian Vasyl Domanytsky, who was also a patient in Zakopane, during which time Domanytsky helped translate into Ukrainian the verses Lypynsky was incorporating into his monograph from Danylo Bratkovsky and encouraged him to publish some of his writing. He then intended to return to Ukraine and study history, first at Taras Shevchenko National University of Kyiv and then Lviv University, but his plans fell apart, and he returned to Jagiellonian University in 1908. He was then an "ordinary listener" to attend courses, but left soon after from Jagiellonian to start working and never formally completed his education.

=== Pre-World War I and literary activities ===
==== Cooperation with Rada and the Rakowski affair ====
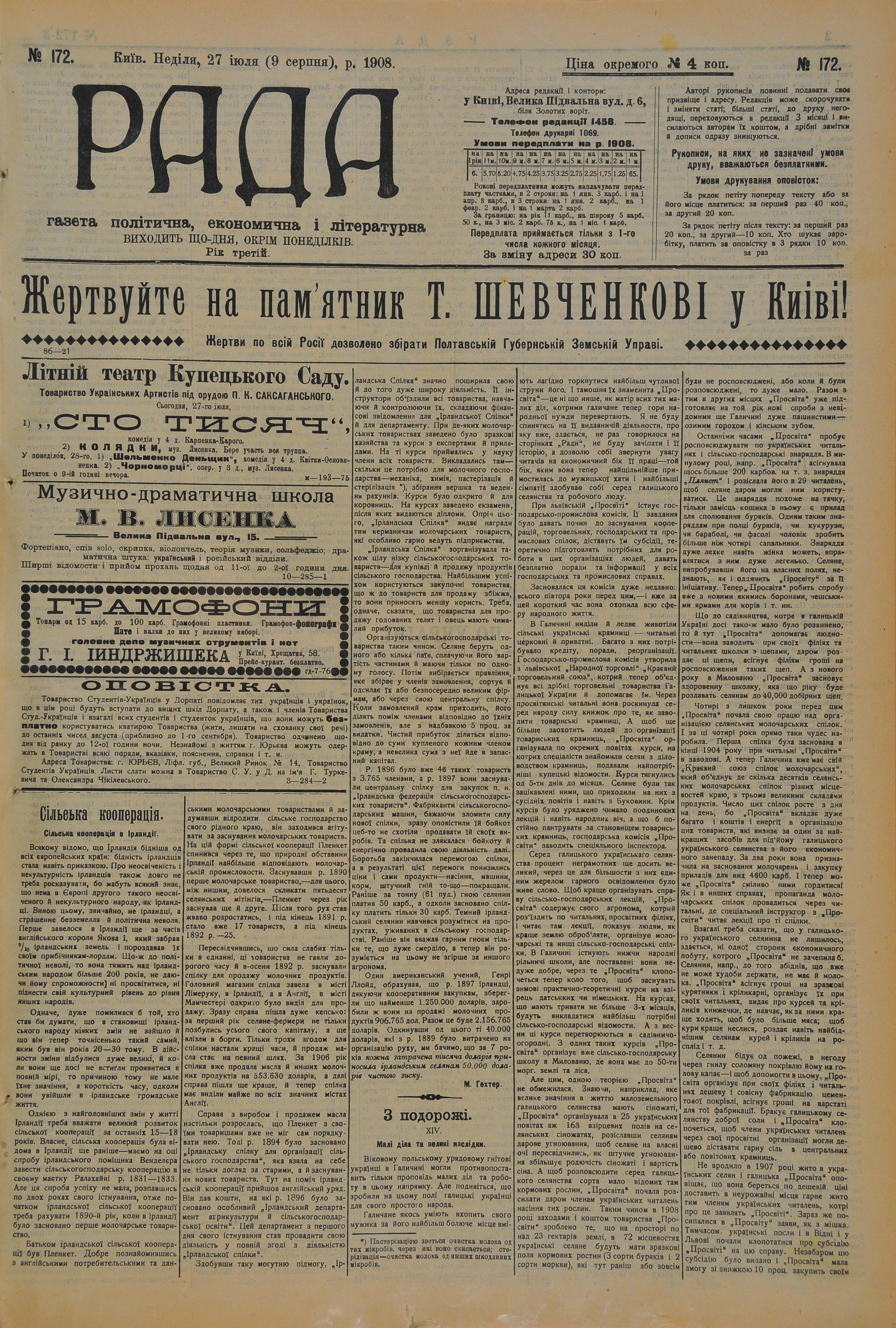
A 1908 edition of Rada.

After leaving his schooling, he became employed as a writer at the first Ukrainian daily newspaper Rada. He mostly wrote under the pseudonym "V. Pravoberezhets" for the newspaper (Pravoberezhets literally translating to "Right-Banker"), although he sometimes used his real name or "Prav.", intermittently in 1908, 1910, and 1911-12. His first article for the newspaper came from his friendship with the newspaper's official publisher, Borys Hrinchenko, who commissioned him to compile Polish books suitable for Ukrainian translation. He worked for the newspaper for free because he stated it was his personal duty to the Ukrainian cause to promote it. The vast majority of his articles for Rada addressed Polish-Ukrainian relations, both in Russian and in the Austro-Hungarian-ruled Ukraine. He stated there were three Polish political currents in Russian-ruled Ukraine: the conciliationists, the all-Polish nationalists, and the democratic-Ukrainophiles. He dismissed the first two groups as hostile to Ukraine but identified with the latter. He also attacked the spread of equivalences between Galician Ruthenians and Russians in Western Europe, arguing that the all-Polish press was using this to conceal Ukrainian nationalism from the world, and argued that Russian and Polish reactionaries shared a common ideological platform of a common hatred of the "Ukrainian national revival".

He drew immense attention to himself and Rada when in the summer of 1910 the Polish newspaper Goniec Wieczorny published so-called "revelations" from Bolesław Rakowski, who claimed he was a Polish spy within Prussia who had found the existence of documents that proved the Ukrainian nationalism movement was financed by Prussia. He named four people - "Fedorchuk, Shelukhin, Lutsenko, and Lipinsky" - and several Ukrainian newspapers that were alleged to have been paid with Prussian marks, with the Lipinsky being immediately identified as Lypynsky by Goniec Wieczorny. The accusations quickly spread through Polish publications, to which he published the article "Knights of Lies and False Denunciations" in Rada, where he called the accusations baseless and accused the main newspaper spreading the accusations, Dziennik Kijowski, of knowingly spreading false information. Lypynsky, soon after, in June 1910, confirmed he would sue the editors of the accusations in court alongside Rada. However, the case never made it to court as the two newspapers he was suing - Goniec Wieczorny and Kurjer Warszawski, gave official apologies for the damages caused and confirmed the accusations were unfounded.

However, just two years later, he left the newspaper in 1912. He stated in a letter when he distanced himself from the newspaper in 1912 that there was a fundamental ideological difference growing between himself and the newspaper as his motivation for leaving. He thought that Rada had begun to represent the populist-democratic Ukrainian intelligentsia, who were only advocating for autonomy within Russia and were willing to entertain the ideas of pan-Slavic solidarity. However, Lypynskyy identified himself as a conservative territorial independentist and considered the intelligentsia politically useless and timid in separatism. In order to remedy the drift, in late 1912, the founder of Rada, Yevhen Chykalenko, offered him to be the lead editor. However, he wrote back in a letter to Chykalenko that it would be impossible for him - who believed in a separatist Ukrainian movement, was a Catholic, a noble - to be the editor, and rejected the proposal.

==== Szlachta na Ukrainie ====
Szlachta na Ukrainie as printed in 1909.

Lypynsky began working on his brochure "Szlachta na Ukrainie" in the spring of 1907, drawing on the historical material he gathered in Kraków and Geneva. The brochure was to be designed to show the history of the nobles on Ukrainian lands against the backdrop of Ukraine's struggle for statehood, ultimately proving the important role that the nobles had in state-building. However, his work was interrupted when he fell ill in Zakopane in 1907, and he didn't return to the work until 1908.

Throughout the summer of 1908 he began a series of lectures delivered in Polish and directed at stirring the Right-Bank nobility toward Ukraine. He delivered the main lectures in August 1908, which was entitled "About Ukrainianism and the Attitude of the Polish-Ukrainian Nobility toward It". He positioned himself as "by origin to the Polonized noble-Ukrainian society, [but] considers itself Ukrainian" in Kyiv and Lutsk during these lectures. During meetings with participants afterward, many expressed a desire for a printed organ of regionalist-territorialist orientation. During this time, he also worked on "Szlachta na Ukrainie" again, which had turned into what was essentially the expanded version of these lectures that he gave.

The brochure was published in late 1908/09 in Kraków at a content length of 90 pages. The foreword defined why he had written it: to draw Polish society to Ukraine, the necessity of defining the Polish society's attitude toward the Ukrainian revival, and the movement that considered itself Ukrainian. In the first section of the brochure, he went over a history of Ukraine - particularly advocating the use of "Ukraine/Ukrainian" as a better designation than "Rus'/Ruthenian" which was in standard use, and traced the process of what he called Polonization on the Right-Bank and the Russification of the Left-Bank. He then attempted to prove that the local nobility was of Ukrainian origin, which was never truly Polish in a national sense because they were the type of "gente Ruthenus, natione Polonus". Lastly, he called upon the Right-Bank nobility to make a choice and to support Ukrainian culture. While scholar Jaroslaw Pelenski characterized the brochure as belonging to Lypynsky's "democratic period" of thinking (prior to 1917) before his full shift to conservatism, he still praised the role of the German monarchy in the Balkans and furthermore, in private conversations with Mykhailo Hrushevsky proposed the possibility of a conservative current in the Ukrainian movement.

Almost immediately after the brochure's release it was banned although the censorship office for Kyiv allowed it for sale if the 30 pages covering the history of Polonization in Ukraine were removed. Lypynsky refused to do so, although copies still circulated among academians at the time. The brochure came into controversy from almost all angles: the Polish press advocated for destroying copies and claimed that Lypynsky demanded Catholics convert to Orthodoxy, and Russian nationalists said he was disowning the Polish name. Despite this, Dmytro Doroshenko stated the book was as important to the Ukrainian national identity at the time as Volodymyr Antonovych's Confession, and stated it was a landmark public declaration at the time.

==== Polish-language newspapers ====
After the series of lectures he delivered in the summer of 1908, Lypynsky sought to create a newspaper directed towards the Ukrainianization of the Polish nobility entitled "Przegląd Krajowy", first approaching Yosyp Yurkevych as a potential publisher of it. However, he rejected the idea of pandering towards such an audience. He then approached Bohdan Yaroshevsky, the founder of the Ukrainian Socialist Party, who agreed to publish it with the financial support of Count Mykhaylo Tyshkevych of the Tyszkiewicz family. The periodical was first launched in May 1909. It lasted for a total of 12 issues and had subscribers from Ukraine, St. Petersburg, Warsaw, and Lviv and was written entirely in Polish.

The periodical was reviewed favorably by the Ukrainian press, such as Rada and Dilo, which considered it as uniting Ukrainians of Polish culture and Poles on Ukrainian territory together. It was less favorably viewed by the Polish press, which was critical of it. However, it wouldn't last long due to chronic financial problems and insufficient reception of territorialist ideas, especially by the broader Polish public. Andrey Sheptytsky attempted to save the paper by providing an emergency funding of 1,000 crowns and even attempted to resort to abandoning it and creating a new monthly called "Przegląd Ukraiński", which was never realized. The project collapsed in early 1910, and he would look back critically on its failure.

He later attempted the idea again in late 1912 with the monthly "Życie Ukraińskie", but this also was never realized because he lacked collaborators who would write for it. The monthly was to be the organ of the Latin Church in Ukraine, however, and was not directed towards the whole Polish elements, and instead he wanted to address it to "the public that reads in Polish." His last attempt at writing in a Polish newspaper pre-World War I was in "Ukrainskaya Zhizn" in December 1912, in which he addressed Polish leading circles in relation to Ukraine.

==== Activities in Uman ====
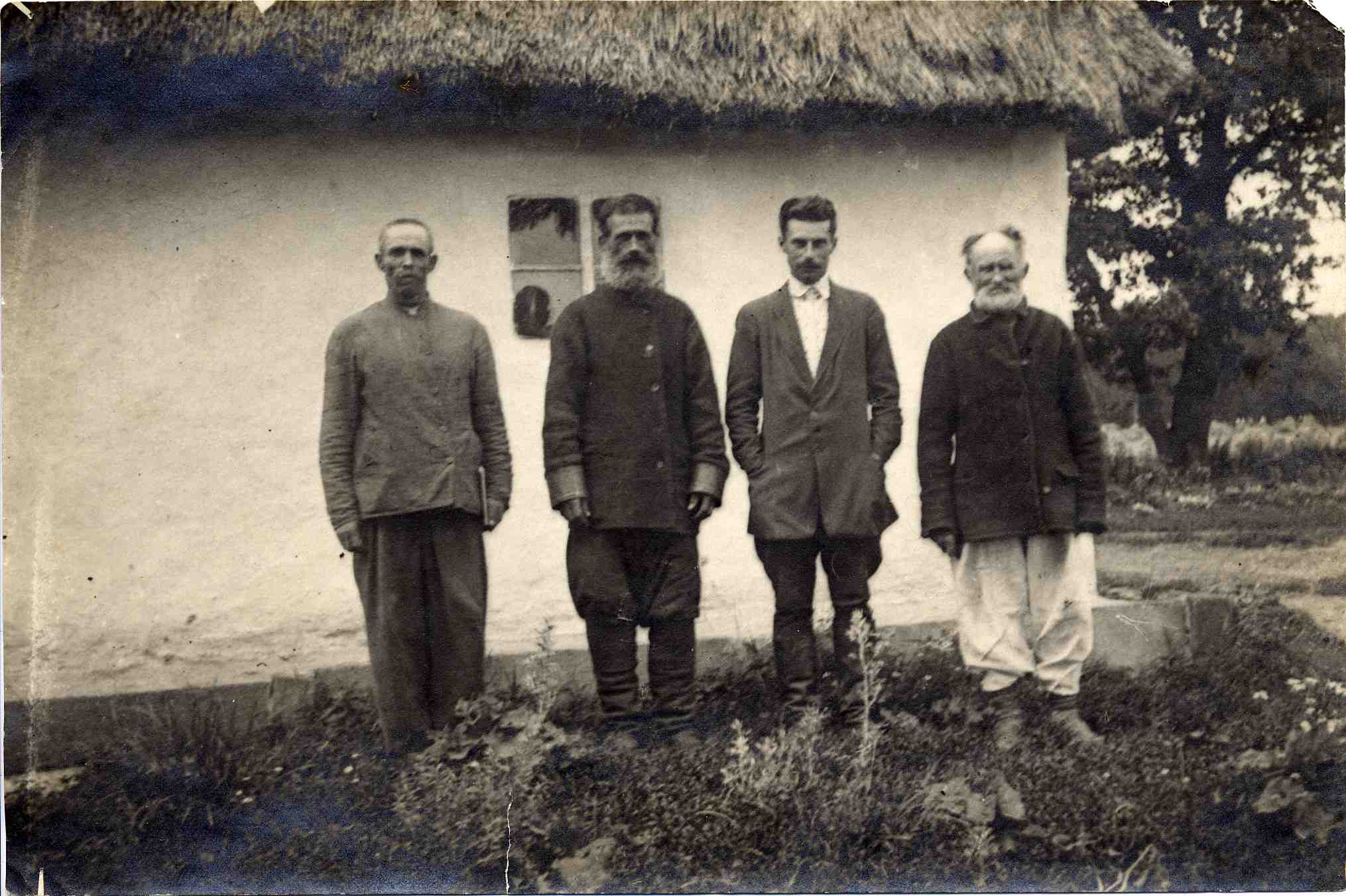
Lypynsky (center) at his estate in Rusalivski Chahary with his peasants in 1913-14.

In July 1913, Lypynsky received the Rusalivski Chahary estate located in the Uman Raion, which consisted of about 160 desyatynas of land, from his uncle Adam Apollonariyovych Rokytsky. I. Hyrych suggests he likely accepted the offer - despite receiving public renown at the time - because of his illness and an attraction to agricultural labor. The farm, also, was a testing ground for his sociological theories, as he had argued that both the landowner and the peasant belonged to the same agricultural class that was to be the background of a new Ukrainian aristocracy. However, the hard labor, including plowing, sowing, and manually building, ate up most of his time, and it stifled his literary works; even if he had managed to start his "History of Ukraine," he still did not publish anything. During the start of the war, he requested that the estate be kept under the administrative care of his uncle, but gave physical protection and upkeep duties to a peasant named Levko Zanuda.

=== World War I ===
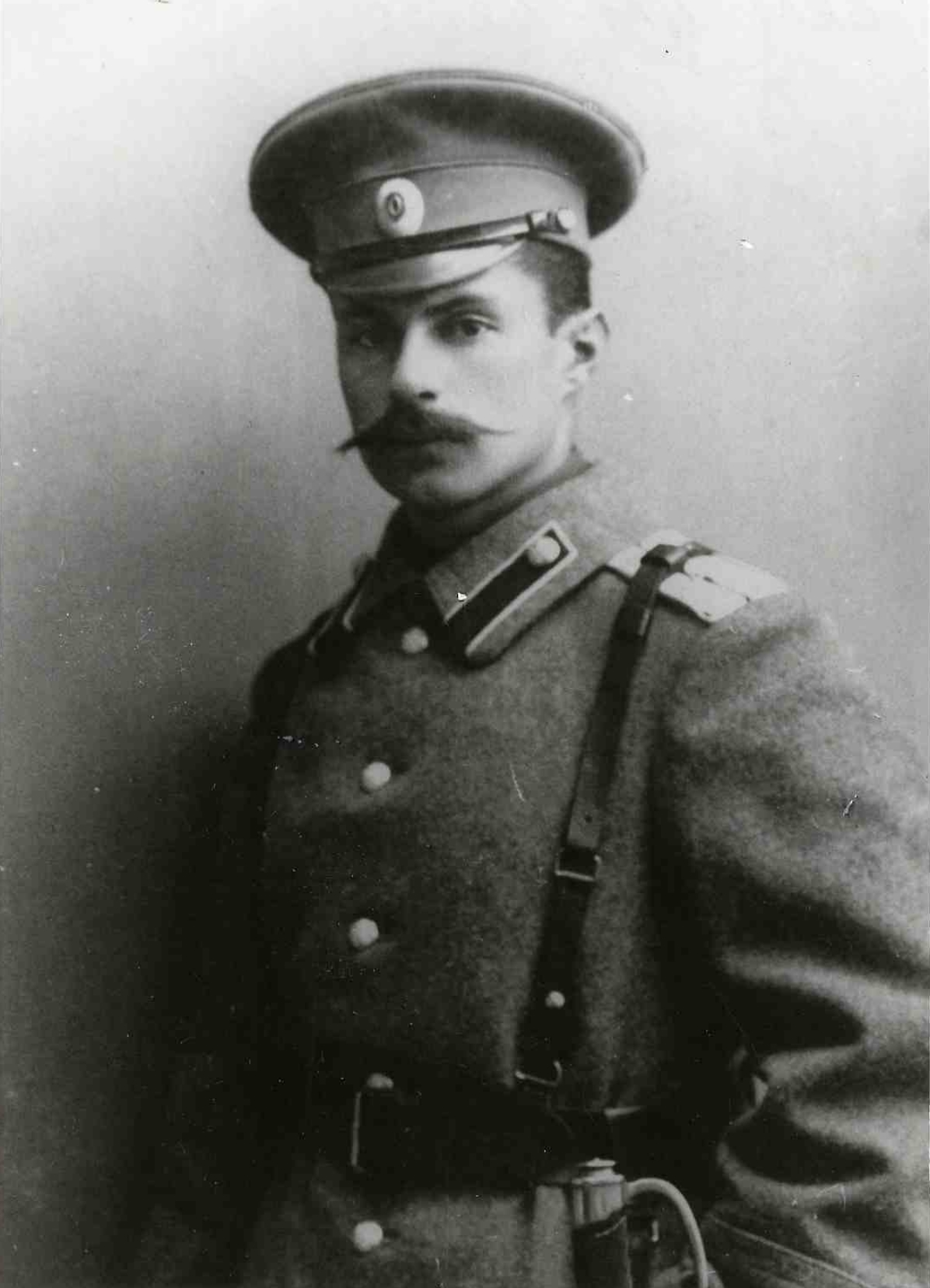
Lypynsky in officer's uniform of the Russian Army, 1914

Anticipating the oncoming international conflict, Lypynsky worked on the establishment of a Ukrainian political centre outside the borders of the Russian Empire, which eventually resulted in the formation of Union for the Liberation of Ukraine. After the outbreak of World War I, a commission at the time recognized him as healthy, and he was called up into the army. In July 1914, then as an ensign, he was assigned to the 4th Novotroitsk-Yekaterinoslavsky Dragoon Regiment, which was headquartered in the Lomzha Governorate and part of the 6th Army Corps. During August and September of 1914, he was part of the ultimately unsuccessful offensive of the Second Army under Alexander Samsonov in East Prussia as part of the advanced cavalry reconnaissance. He participated in the battles for Szczytno, Pasym, and during the defense of Shchuchyn. However, he was eventually wounded during the Battle of Tannenberg near the Masurian Lake District, and after being treated at an infirmary, he was sent back to the rear units, where he served until the February Revolution to improve his health. During his time at the rear, he was stationed in Dubno, Ostroh, and Poltava as the commander of the 4th Cavalry Reserve Department. As commander, he oversaw 300 soldiers and was tasked with replinishing men at the front with horses as needed.

=== Ukrainian People's Republic and Ukrainian State ===
Draft of the Ukrainian coat of arms published by Lypynsky and featuring Archangel Michael with a royal crown

After the February Revolution of 1917, Lypynsky organized the Ukrainization of his army unit stationed in Poltava. However, his activities didn't find support of the General Secretariat of Military Affairs. His proposal to reform the cavalry detachment into a bigger unit subject to the Ukrainian government was declined by the authorities in Kyiv, which at the time still viewed ideas of Ukrainian independence as separatism. Eventually, Lypynsky was forced to disband his military unit.

Disillusioned with the Ukrainian "revolutionary democracy", Lypynsky became a co-founder of the Ukrainian Democratic–Agrarian Party and developed its political program, which envisioned protection of Ukraine's state sovereignty and guaranteed private landownership. Lypynsky criticized the policies of Ukrainian Central Council in respect to "exploiter classes" and its reliance exclusively on the proletariat.

Following the establishment of the Hetmanate, Lypynsky was appointed Ukrainian ambassador in Vienna, remaining on that position following the restoration of the Ukrainian People's Republic. During that period, he was several times offered the position of foreign minister, but decline those proposals. As Ukraine's ambassador in Austria, Lypynsky took part in the ratification of the Treaty of Brest.

In June 1919, Lypynsky resigned from the post of ambassador in protest against the execution of colonel Petro Bolbochan by Ukrainian authorities. Another cause for his resignation were the attempts of Ukrainian emigrants in Vienna to get access to state funds of the Ukrainian People's Republic, which were kept in banks of the former Habsburg monarchy. Lypynsky's deputy was accused of financial irregularities and committed suicide in April 1920; Lypynsky himself called him a victim of "anarchy" and "persecution of political opponents".

=== Emigration and later years ===
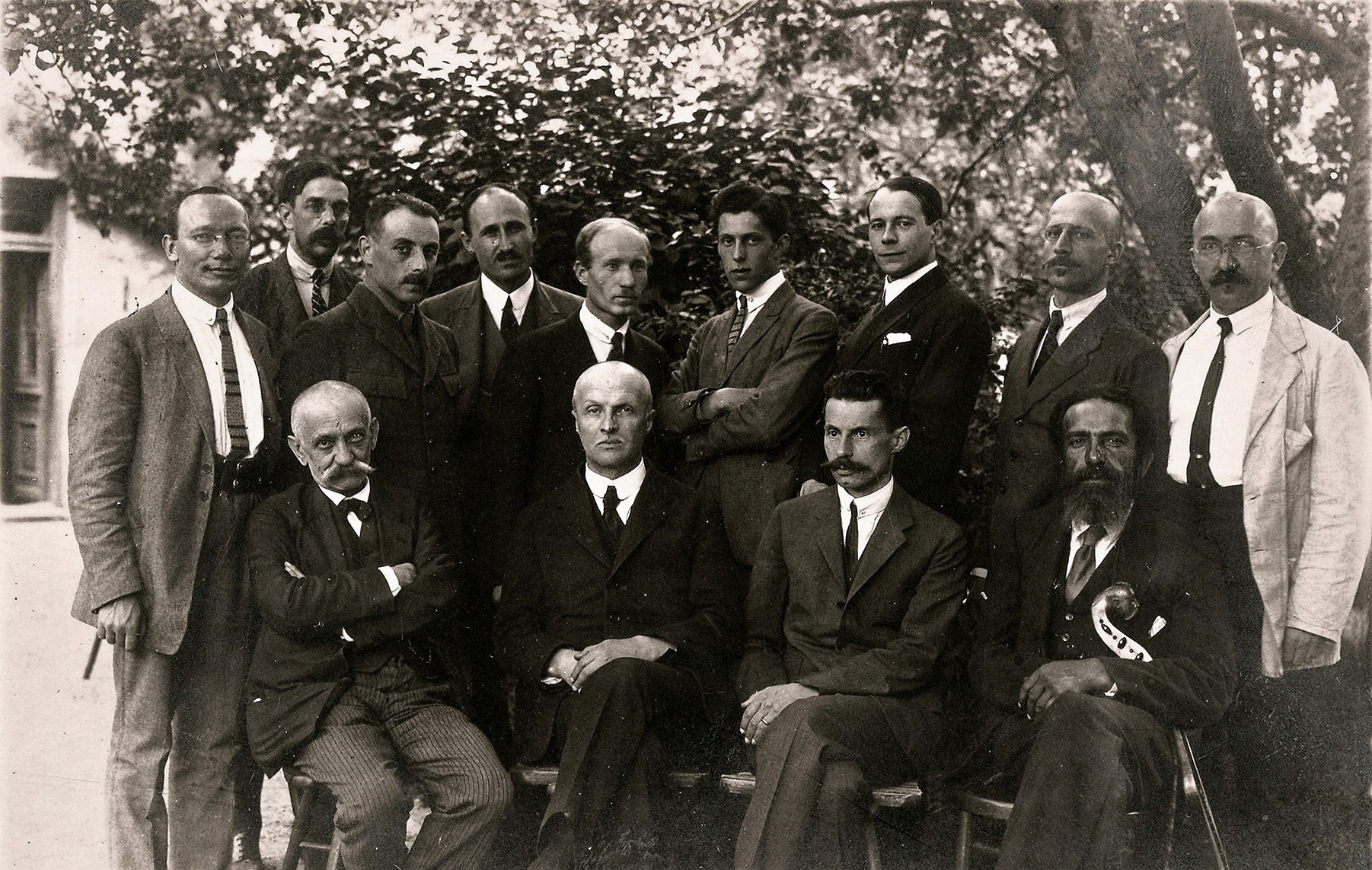
Lypynsky with members of the Ukrainian Union of Agriculturalist Statesmen

Following his resignation, Lypynsky stayed in Austria, settling in Reichenau near Semmering, where he owned a poultry farm. Emigration years saw the peak of Lypynsky's activities: in 1920 he published his monograph dedicated to the period of Ukrainian history between 1657 and 1659, and between 1920 and 1925 published his Letters to Brothers Agriculturalists (Листи до братів-хліборобів), which were printed as a separate book in 1926. In emigration, Lypynsky initiated the creation of the monarchist Ukrainian Union of Agriculturalist Statesmen, heading its supreme council and creating the organization's statute.

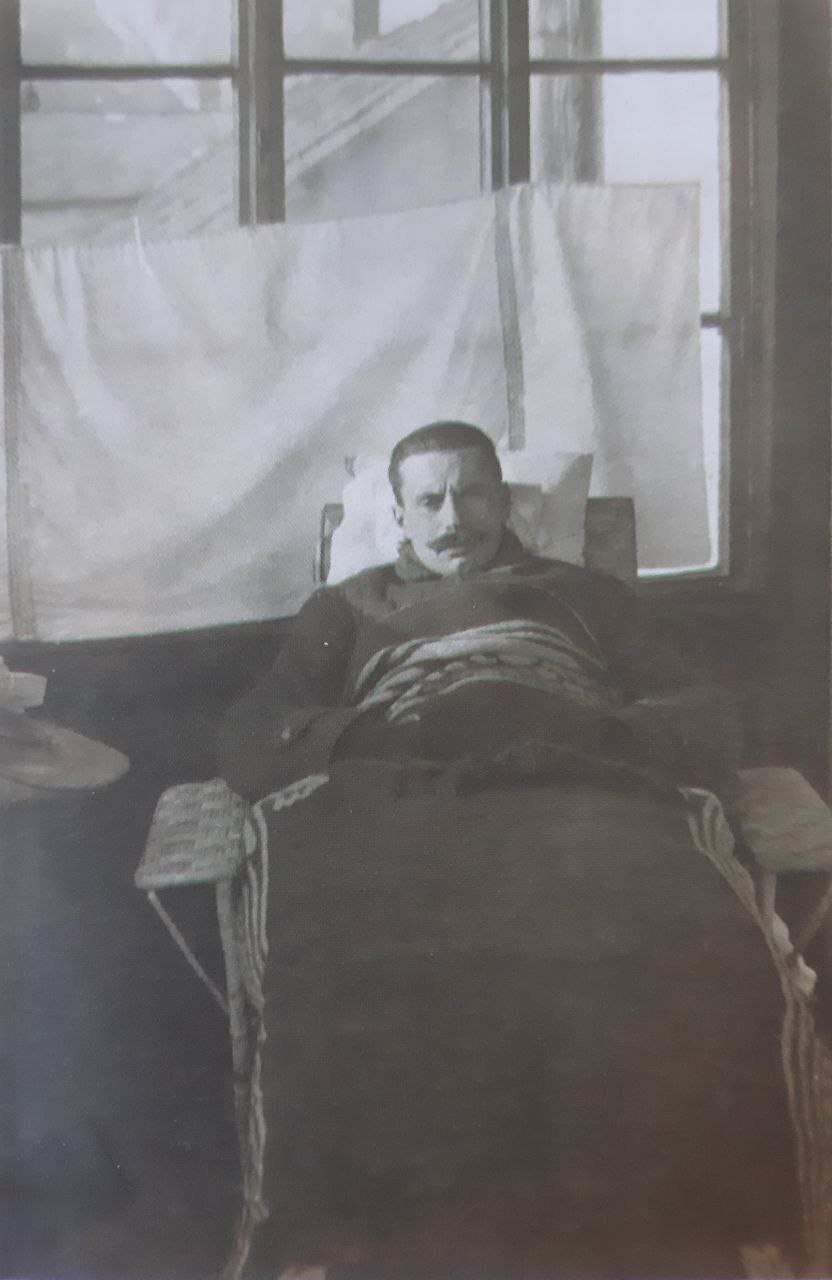
Lypynsky during his final illness in 1930

In 1921 Soviet Cheka sentenced Lypynsky and a number of other Ukrainian émigré activists to death in absentia. After the foundation of the Ukrainian Free University in 1921, Lypynsky became its professor along with Mykhailo Hrushevsky and Oleksander Kolessa. In 1926-1927 he worked at the Ukrainian Scientific Institute in Berlin. However, he was soon forced to leave his position at the establishment due to worsening health and settled in Badegg near Graz. In 1930, due to a conflict with hetman Pavlo Skoropadsky, Lypynsky declared the dissolution of his union on the pages of Dilo newspaper. With a small group of supporters, he established the Brotherhood of Ukrainian Classocrat Monarchists, and published its program in an affiliated newspaper.

As a result of a bad cold survived by him during military service, in his later years Lypynsky suffered from a chronical lung disease, eventually diagnosed as tuberculosis. Progressing lethargy made him fear being buried alive, as a result of which he left a testament instructing to pierce his heart before burial. Lypynsky died on 14 June 1931 in a Wienerwald sanatorium near Vienna. He was buried in his native village of Zaturtsi.

== Views ==
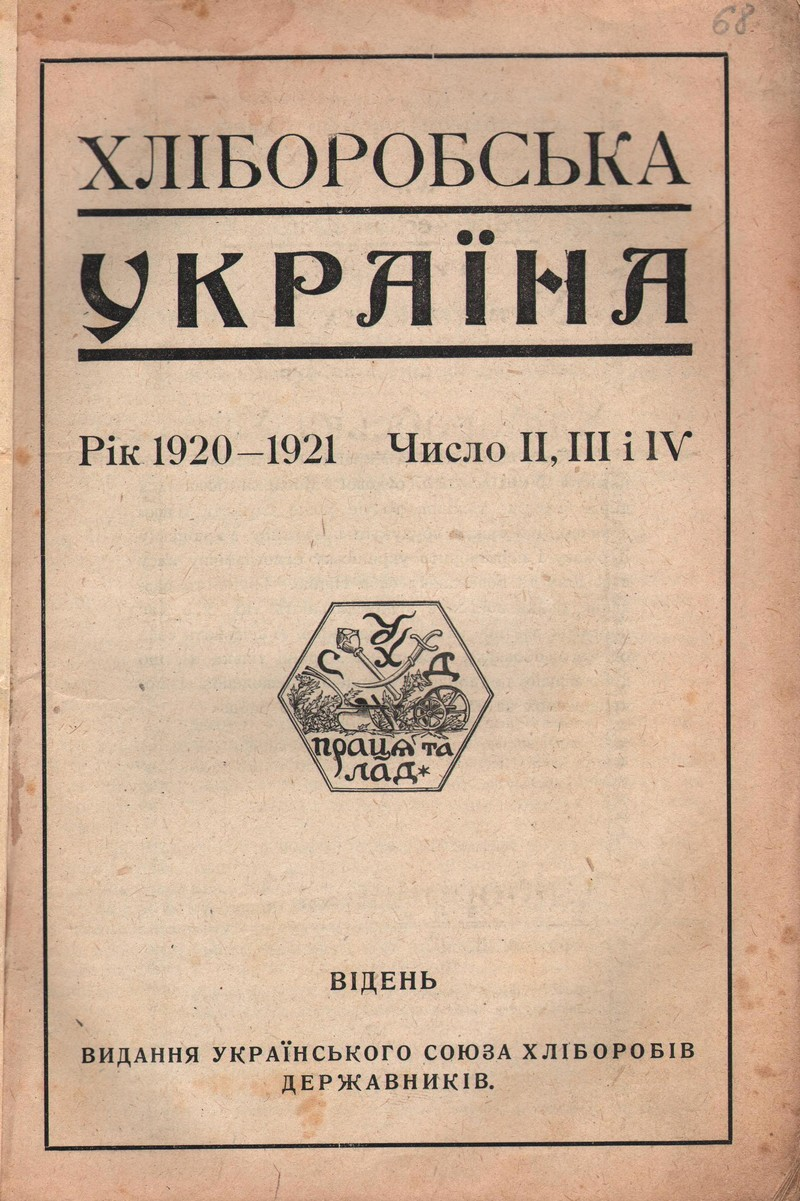
Issue of Хліборобська Україна ("Agriculturalist Ukraine"), a magazine published by Lypynsky during the early 1920s

=== Politics ===
A conservative monarchist, Lypynsky was critical of the populism and socialism of the leadership of the Central Council and Directorate of Ukraine, which emphasised the workers and intelligentsia as a source of support. Instead, Lypynsky proposed that the focus of the struggle of independence should be built around the peasantry, the bourgeois, and the elite. Accordingly, he felt that a primary focus in the struggle for Ukrainian independence should be the conversion of the Russified or Polonized Ukrainian elite or nobility to the cause of Ukrainian statehood. Lypynsky wrote that Ukrainian statehood depended on the loyalty of the Ukrainian population towards the Ukrainian state regardless of ethnic origins or social status. A Ukrainian monarch, such as a Hetman, was seen by Lypynsky as essential in cementing the loyalties of the members of various social classes and ethnicities. Although opposed to democracy, Lypynsky's national and class inclusiveness was also opposed to the integral nationalist ideology of his rival Dmytro Dontsov.

Lypynsky's political ideas were significantly influenced by works of Georges Sorel, Vilfredo Pareto and Gustave Le Bon. According to him, all states emerge as a result of conquest and are ruled by a political elite, which can base its power on military, economic, or intellectual dominance over the society. He divided all political regimes into three main groups, classocracy, democracy and ochlocracy, which exist in all historical periods and replace one another due to the logic of historical process. At the same time, Lypynsky opposed the notion of historical determinism.

Lypynsky supported the consolidation of the Ukrainian nation around ideas of "territorial patriotism" and overcoming the social, religious and ethnic divisions. A major role in this process, according him, has to be played by the assimilation of denationalized upper classes. According to Lypynsky, the organization of national trade unions and other class institutions was even more important than establishment of political parties. He criticized the Ukrainian democratic movement, represented by the Ukrainian People's Republic, as well as the Soviet and emerging nationalist currents, seeing both of the latter as representatives of ochlocracy. His ideal of state-building envisioned the establishment of a monarchy based on private landownership and organization of workers, under the leadership of a hetman.

=== Religion ===
As a young man, in 1900 Lypynsky established a society of Ukrainian Catholics in order to oppose left-wing ideas. In questions of religion, he opposed both caesaropapism and clericalism, promoting cooperation between state and church on equal terms. He expressed his views on the history of Ukrainian church in his work Religion and Church in the History of Ukraine, first published in 1925. A Roman Catholic by confession, during his later years Lypynsky supported close contacts with Ukrainian Greek Catholic hierarchs Andrey Sheptytsky and Josyf Slipyj.

=== History ===
Lypynsky centered his narrative of Ukrainian history around the Cossack revolution of the 17th century. He saw that event as part of a process of Ukrainian state-building, which, according him, united all social classes around the Cossacks. In Lypynsky's view, active participation of Ukrainian szlachta in the Cossack movement contributed to the transformation of Cossacks from a semi-nomadic military society into a community of agricultural landowners, and turned the Hetmanate from a purely military institution into a monarchic territorial state evolving towards the establishment of a system based on hereditary political power. Lypynsky saw the 1654 Treaty of Pereyaslav as a military union between Ukraine and Muscovy. His historical views contributed to the establishment of a new school in Ukrainian historiography.

== Legacy ==
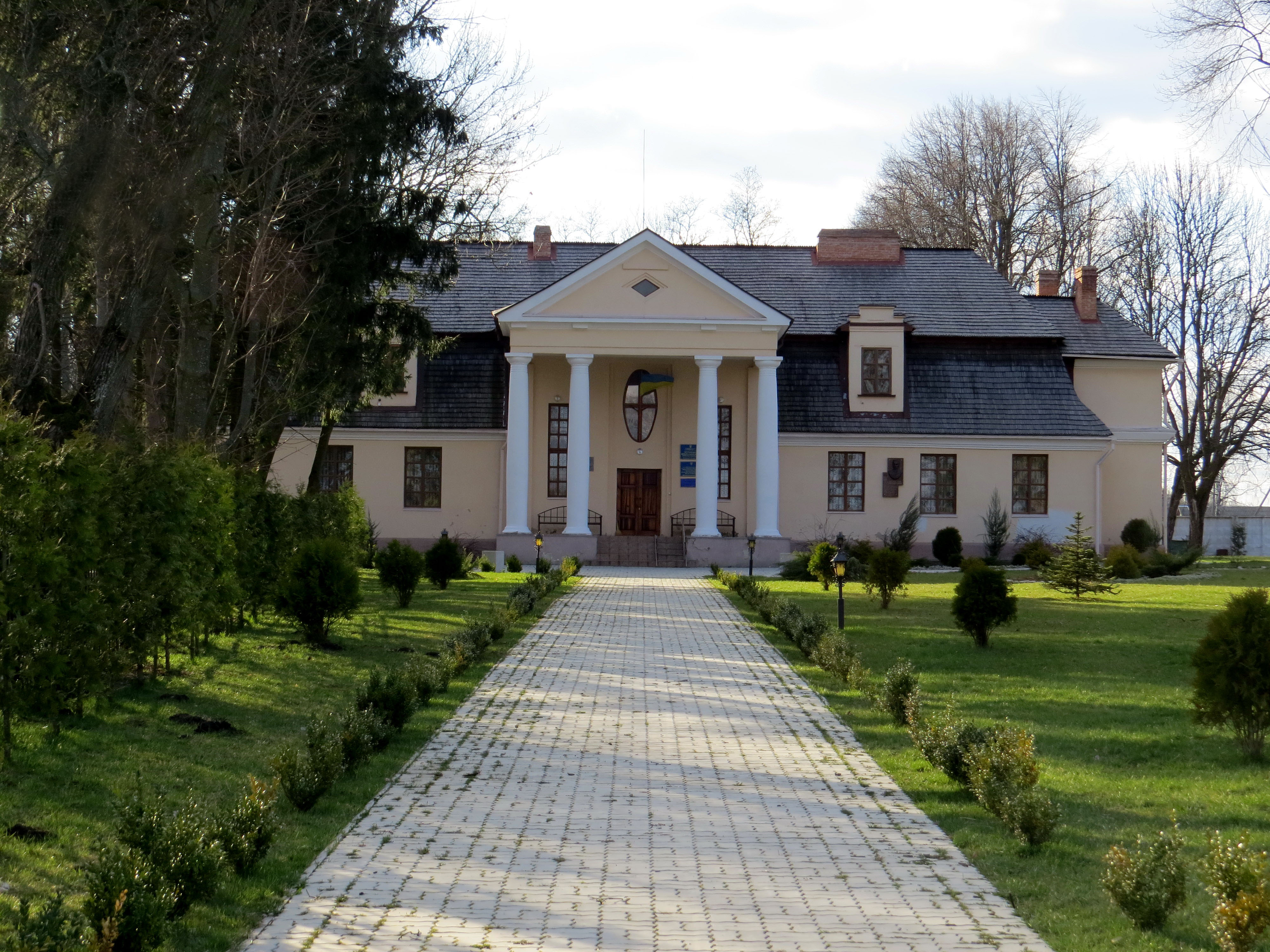
Lypynsky manor in Zaturtsi, now a memorial museum dedicated to Vyacheslav Lypynsky

Lypynsky's personal archive was acquired by metropolitan Andrey Sheptytsky in 1929-1931 and preserved at the Vienna branch of the National Museum. During World War II it was moved to Wels in the American occupation zone, and later transported to the Ukrainian Catholic University in Rome. Copies of documents from the archive were used by the Lypynsky East European Research Institute established in Philadelphia in 1963.

Lypynsky's ideas were promoted by Vasyl Rudko, a member of the OUN-M, in his 1949 monograph about the split of the Organization of Ukrainian Nationalists. Rudko viewed Lypynsky's philosophy as a better alternative to works of Dmytro Dontsov, and claimed it to be the only viable political theory in Ukraine's current circumstances. Among notable figures who studied Lypynsky's legacy and worked on the publication of his works were Omeljan Pritsak and Ivan L. Rudnytsky.

An international scientific conference dedicated to Lypynsky's heritage was organized in 1992 in Kyiv and Lutsk. In 1995, a filial of the Volyn Local Museum was established in the former Lypynsky manor in Zaturtsi. In 2011 the institution was turned into a separate autonomous museum, but in 2019 was once again subordinated to the local museum in Lutsk.

== Notable works ==
- Szlachta na Ukrainie. Udział jej w życiu narodu na tle jego dziejów (1909)
- Stanisław Michał Krzyczewski. Z dziejów walki szlachty ukraińskiej w szeregach powstańczych pod wodzą Bohdana Chmielnickiego (1912)
- Z dziejów Ukrainy. Księga pamiątkowa ku czci Włodzimierza Antonowicza, Paulina Święcickiego i Tadeusza Rylskiego, wydana staraniem dr. J. Jurkiewicza, Fr. Wolskiej, Ludw. Siedleckiego i Wacława Lipińskiego (1913)
- Україна на переломі 1657 — 59 (1920)
- Релігія і Церква в історії України (1925)
- Листи до братів-хліборобів (1926)

== Bibliography ==
- Передерій, І. Г. (2012). В'ЯЧЕСЛАВ ЛИПИНСЬКИЙ: ЕТНІЧНИЙ ПОЛЯК, ПОЛІТИЧНИЙ УКРАЇНЕЦЬ (PDF) (in Ukrainian). Полтава: Видавництво ПолтНТУ.

== Sources ==
- Dovidnyk z istoriï Ukraïny, 3-Volumes, "Vyacheslav Lypynsky " (t. 2), Kyiv, 1993-1999, ISBN 5-7707-5190-8 (t. 1), ISBN 5-7707-8552-7 (t. 2), ISBN 966-504-237-8 (t. 3).
