= Yelyzaveta Myloradovych =

Ukrainian activist and philanthropist (1832-1890)

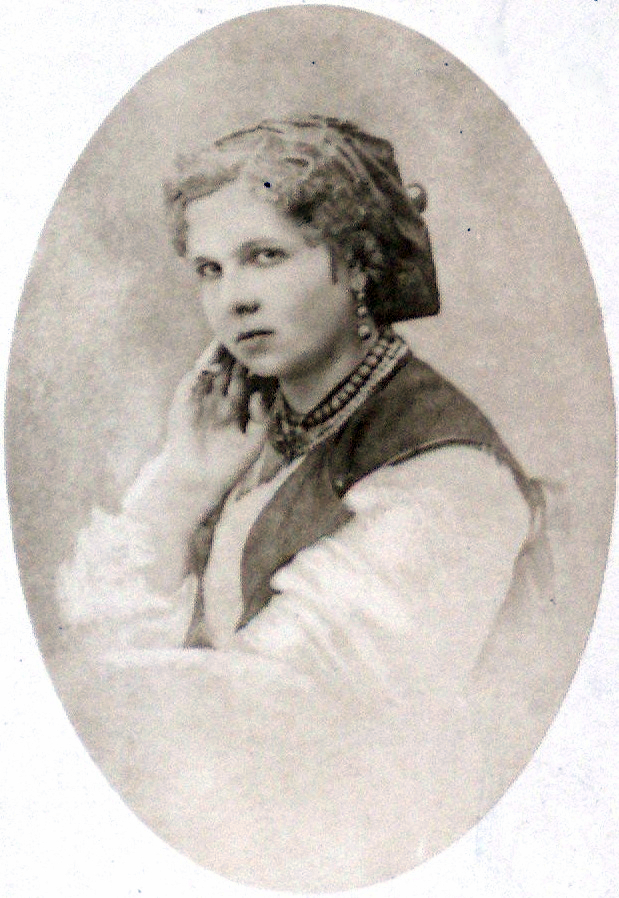
Yelyzaveta Myloradovych

Yelyzaveta (Yelysaveta) Myloradovych (née Skoropadska, Ukrainian: Єлизавета (Єлисавета) Милорадович (Скоропадська); 12 January 1832, Trostianets, Pryluky county, Poltava Governorate – 27 March 1890, Poltava) was a civic activist, philanthropist and member of the Ukrainian Hromada community, who became one of the founders of Shevchenko Scientific Society, the first prototype of a Ukrainian Academy of Sciences.

== Biography ==
Yelyzaveta was the daughter of Ivan Skoropadsky, Marshal of the Nobility of Poltava Governorate and member of the Skoropadsky family. In 1856, at the insistence of her parents, she married Lev Myloradovych, whose mother belonged to the noble Kochubey family. During the 1860s Yelyzaveta was active in the Poltava Hromada and sponsored Ukrainian publishing, Sunday schools and women's education. Following the issue of Valuyev Circular, which started the period of bans against Ukrainian culture in the Russian Empire, she provided financial support to the Ukrainian national movement in the Austrian-ruled Galicia, funding activities of the Prosvita society and the journal Pravda. In 1873, along with Vasyl Symyrenko, Myloradovych donated 9,000 gulden (an equivalent of 20,000 Austrian kronen) for the establishment of the Shevchenko Society in Lviv. She also initiated the creation of the society's statute, which was composed by Mykhailo Drahomanov and Dmytro Pylchykov. In 1878 she became the head of Poltava Philanthropic Society. Her activities were investigated by Tsarist authorities, who suspected Myloradovych of presiding over a group aiming to restore the Hetmanate.

== Personal life ==
After the premature death of her first child, Yelyzaveta lived separately from her husband. During the following years she was claimed to have engaged in several love affairs. Known as an emancipee, she liked to travel, wore fashionable dresses and smoked. Having taught herself English, she dreamed to make a translation of the History of the Ruthenians. Myloradovych's salon was frequented by Vasyl Bilozersky, Oleksandr Konysky and members of the Doroshenko family. Using her personal connections, Yelyzaveta engaged in the smuggling of banned literature, including poems by Taras Shevchenko, which she spread among her acquaintances.

Myloradovych's nephew was Pavlo Skoropadsky, the future Hetman of Ukraine.
