= Rozalia Vynnychenko =

Wife of the first Ukrainian president

- Розалія Винниченко

First Lady of Ukraine
- In role 1919
- President: Volodymyr Vynnychenko
- Preceded by: Oleksandra Skoropadska
- Succeeded by: Olha Petliura

Personal details
- Born: 26 July 1886 Oryol, Russian Empire
- Died: 26 February 1959 (aged 72) Mougins, France
- Spouse: Volodymyr Vynnychenko
- Education: Sorbonne University
- Occupation: Former First Lady of Ukraine

Rozalia Yakivna Vynnychenko (Note: Ukrainian: Розалія Яківна Винниченко) (née Lifshyts; (Note: Ukrainian: Ліфшиць) 26 July 1886 – 6 February 1959) was a spouse of Ukrainian political leader Volodymyr Vynnychenko.

Born to a Russian Jewish family in Orel, Russia, in 1909 Lifshits graduated from the Medical faculty of Sorbonne University.

In 1909 Vynnychenko met with Rozalia in Cavi di Lavagna visiting the Russian philosopher Boris Yakovenko who was married to Rozalia's sister Vera.

== See also ==
- First Lady of Ukraine

== Notes ==
Honorary titles
Preceded by Oleksandra Skoropadska	First Lady of Ukraine; 1918	Succeeded by Olha Petliura
