= Hetmanite movement =

1920s–1930s Ukrainian conservative-monarchist movement

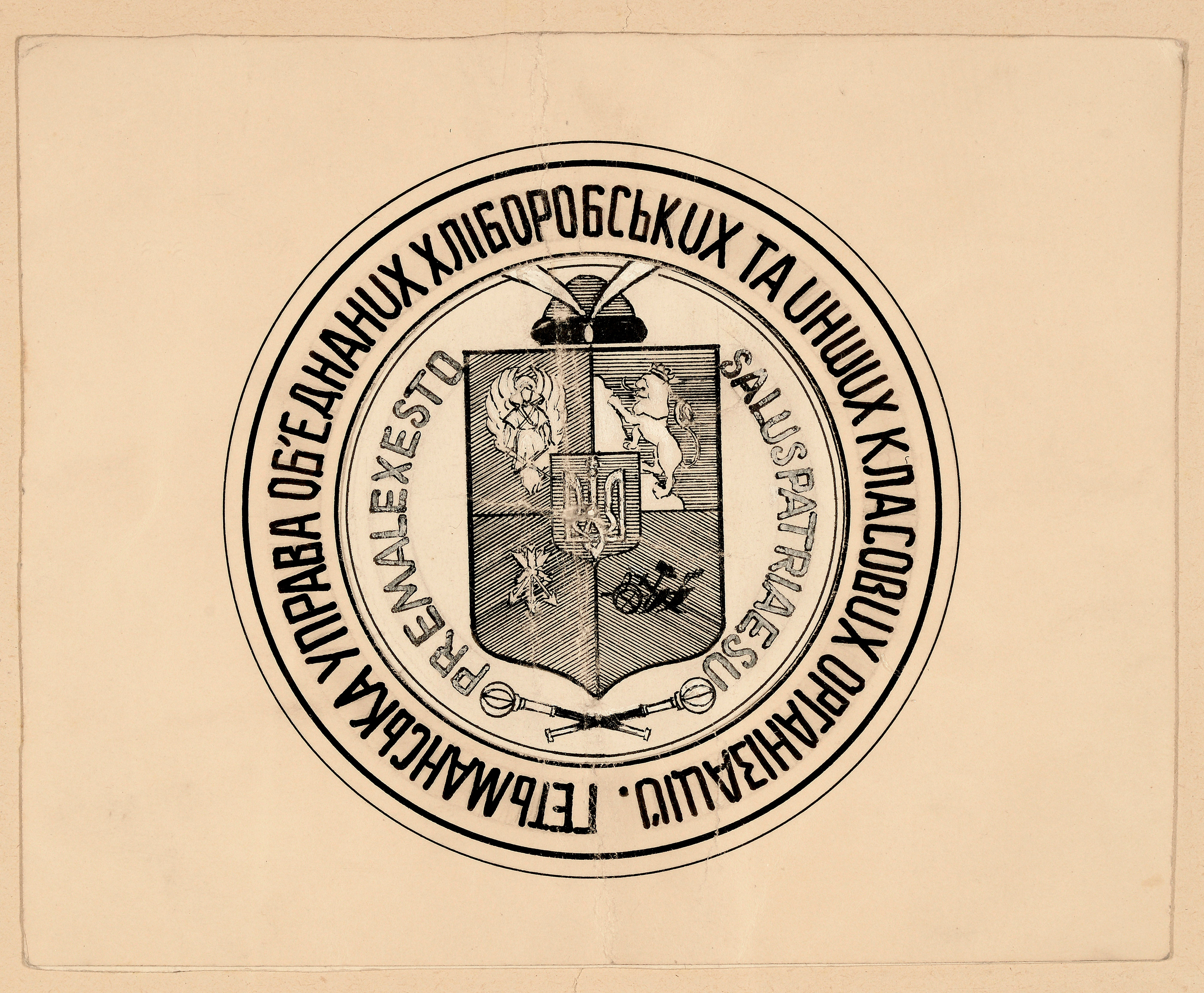
Seal used by the leadership of Hetmanite movement, 1922

The Hetmanite movement was a conservative-monarchist movement that sought to restore Ukrainian independence and reestablish the Ukrainian State and Hetmanate under Pavlo Skoropadskyi.

== History ==
The movement was mostly active in the 1920s and 1930s. The Hetmanite movement was founded in 1920 in Vienna by Pavlo Skoropadskyi, former Hetman of the Ukrainian state and leader of the hetmanite movement, Oleksandr Skoropys-Ioltukhovskyi, a former member of the Hetman's government in the Kholm region and Podlachia, Volodymyr Zalozetskyi, head of the Ukrainian National Party in Bukovina, Mykola Kochubei, and the organization's founder, leader, and ideologue, Viacheslav Lypynskyi.

The movement operated mostly in Germany, United States, and Canada, and included the Ukrainskyi Soiuz Khliborobiv Derzhavnykiv (Ukrainian Union of Grain Growers and Statesmen). On January 1st 1943 it celebrated its founding. but the Ukrainskyi Soiuz Khliborobiv Derzhavnykiv was dissolved in 1937 and replaced by the Ukrainskyi Soiuz Hetmantsiv Derzhavnykiv (Ukrainian Union of Hetmanites and Statesmen). In April 1945 Pavlo Skoropadskyi died and his widow served as regent to the Hetmanite Movement until November 5th,1948 when Skoropadskyi's son, Danylo Skoropadskyi was proclaimed leader after his mother's resignation as regent.

After Danylo Skoropadskyi's death in 1957 and Ukraine's independence in 1991, the Hetmanite movement became a symbolic movement, with the Skoropadsky family continuing to claim the title of Hetman of all Ukraine.

== Members and leaders ==
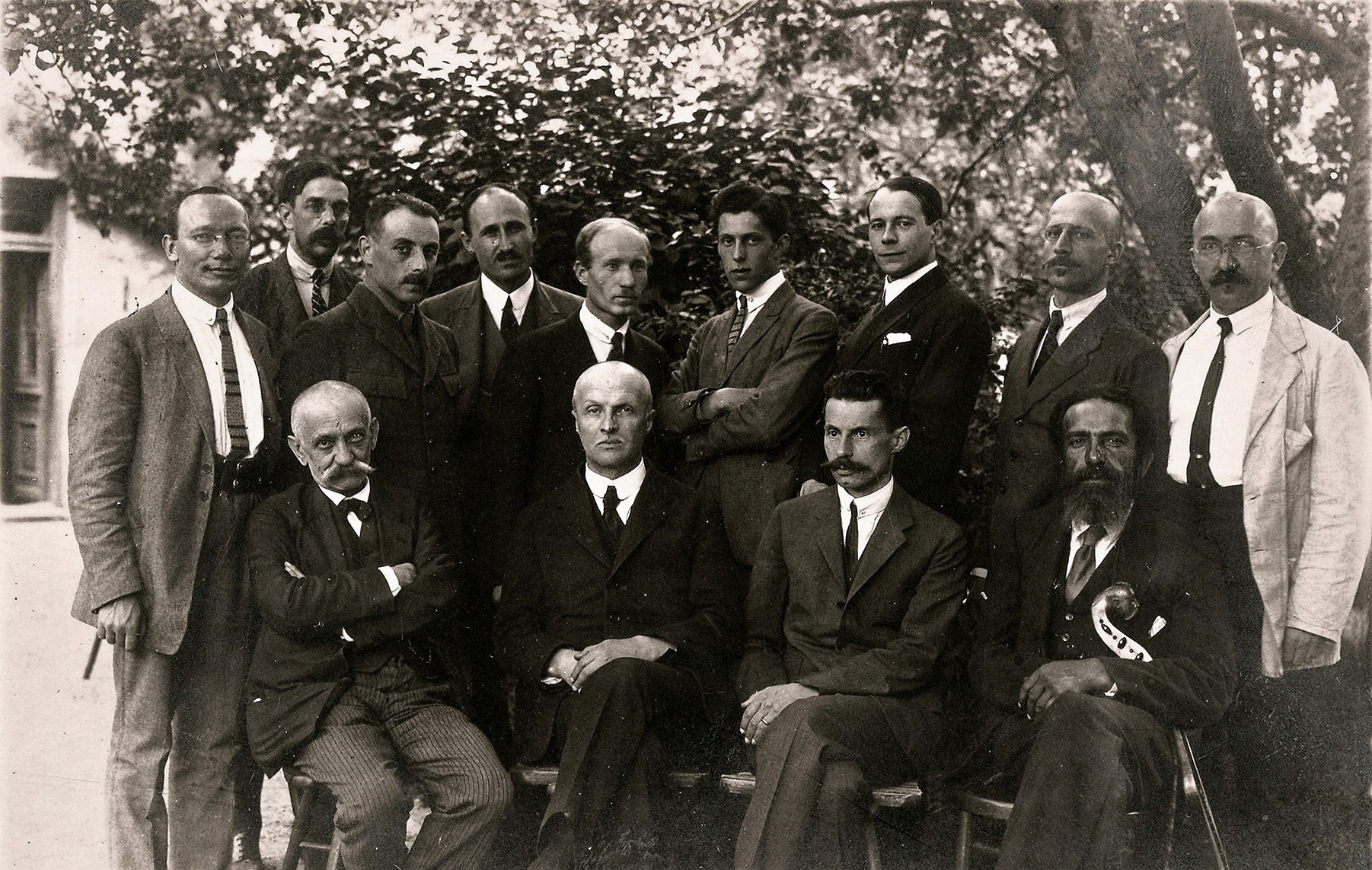
Foundational congress of USKhD, 1922

- Pavlo Skoropadskyi – leader of the movement
- Oleksandr Skoropys-Ioltukhovskyi – founding member, former Hetman official
- Volodymyr Zalozetskyi – architectural scientist, explorer of Byzantine influence on Ukrainian art
- Mykola Kochubei – founding member
- Viacheslav Lypynskyi – founder and ideologue
