= Oleksandra Skoropadska =

Wife of the Hetman of Ukraine

Oleksandra Skoropadska Олександра Скоропадська
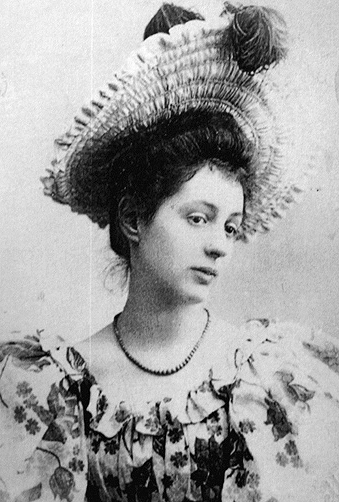

First Lady of Ukraine
- In role 1918
- Preceded by: Maria-Ivanna Hrushevska
- Succeeded by: Rozalia Vynnychenko

Personal details
- Born: Oleksandra Petrivna Durnovo; 23 May 1878 Saint Petersburg, Russian Empire
- Died: 29 December 1952 (aged 74) Oberstdorf, Bavaria, West Germany
- Spouse: Pavlo Skoropadskyi
- Relations: Durnovo family
- Children: 6
- Education: Sorbonne University
- Occupation: Spouse of the Hetman of Ukraine

Oleksandra Petrivna Skoropadska (née Durnovo; Ukrainian: Олександра Петрівна Скоропадська; 23 May 1878 – 29 December 1952) was a Russian and Ukrainian noblewoman, the spouse of Ukrainian political and military leader Pavlo Skoropadskyi.

== Life ==
Oleksandra Durnovo was born on 4 June [O.S. 23 May] 1878 in Saint Petersburg. Her father Pyotr Pavlovich was a general of the Imperial Russian Army who hailed from the Durnovo family; her mother Maria Vasilyevna was a member of the Kochubey family, descending from Zaporozhian Cossacks.

As an imperial lady-in-waiting, she was part of the Russian court. There she met Pavlo Skoropadskyi, whom she married in 1898 despite her father's initial resistance.

She followed her husband during his service in the Russian army and subsequently during his brief tenure as Hetman of Ukraine. After Skoropadskyi was overthrown, Oleksandra and their children joined him in exile in Germany.

From 1923, she worked at the Ukrainian Red Cross Assistance, which was also called the Ukrainian Refugee Assistance and was headed by her. The main purpose of the organization was to assist the refugees who kept arriving in Germany.

== Family ==
Royal Standard of the Wife of the Hetman of Ukraine

On 11 January 1898 [O.S. 30 December 1897] Oleksandra married Pavlo Petrovych Skoropadskyi in Saint Petersburg, Russia.

They had six children:

- Maria (1898–1959), who married Adam de Montrésor.
- Yelyzaveta (1899–1976), who married Mr. Kuzhym, a painter, sculptor, leader of the Hetman Movement (1959–?).
- Petro (1900–1956), who suffered from epilepsy.
- Danylo Skoropadsky (1906–1957).
- Pavlo (1915–1918), who died from disease.
- Olena Skoropadska-Ott (1919–2014), who married Gerd Ginder (died on 10 April 1945) on 31 August 1943, and married Ludwig Ott on 20 March 1948; her two children are:
  - Alexandra (born 30 January 1954), she married Martin König and had a son Dimitri (born 1989).
  - Irene (born 30 January 1954). She married cultural event manager Roger Cahn (1948–2018).

== Ancestry ==
Ancestors of Oleksandra Skoropadska

8. Dmitri Nikolayevich Durnovo
4. Pavel Dmitriyevich Durnovo
9. Maria Nikitichna Demidova
2. Pyotr Pavlovich Durnovo
10. Prince Pyotr Mikhailovich Volkonsky
5. Princess Alexandra Petrovna Volkonskaya
11. Princess Sophia Grigorievna Volkonskaya
1. Oleksandra Skoropadska
12. Prince Viktor Pavlovich Kochubey
6. Prince Vasiliy Viktorovich Kochubey
13. Maria Vasilyevna Vasilchikova
3. Princess Maria Vasilyevna Kochubey
14. Pavel Gavrilovich Bibikov
7. Helene Pavolvna Bibikova
15. Elisaveta Andreievna Donets-Zakharzhevskaya

Honorary titles
Preceded by Maria-Ivanna Hrushevska	First Lady of Ukraine; 1918	Succeeded by Rozalia Vynnychenko
