= Danylo Skoropadskyi =

Ukrainian-British politician (1904–1957)

- Hetmanych of Ukraine
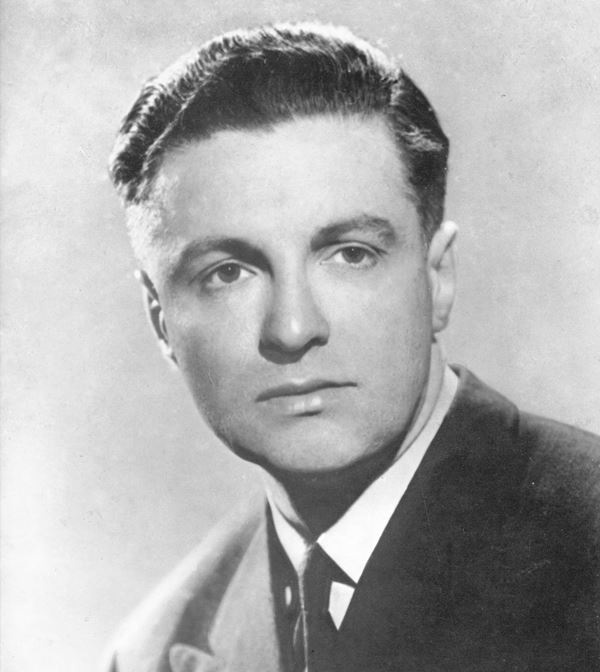
- Skoropadskyi c. 1939 – c. 1948
- Born: 13 February 1904; Saint Petersburg, Russia
- Died: 23 February 1957 (aged 53); London, United Kingdom
- House: Skoropadsky
- Father: Pavlo Skoropadskyi

Danylo Pavlovych Skoropadskyi (Ukrainian: Данило Павлович Скоропадський; 13 February 1904 – 23 February 1957) was a Ukrainian politician who served as the leader of the Hetmanite movement. He held the title of Hetmanych (Crown Prince of Ukraine) in 1918. He was the eldest surviving son of Pavlo Skoropadskyi.

== Biography ==
Royal Standard of the Prince of the Hetman of all Ukraine

During the existence of the Ukrainian State, he studied at the First Gymnasium in Kyiv in 1918. In 1919, Skoropadskyi, along with other members of the House of Skoropadskyi, was forced to flee from Ukraine due to the collapse of his father's regime immediately prior to the Soviet-Polish War. He subsequently lived and studied in Switzerland, and then in Germany, where his father had been granted political asylum in Munich. He moved to London in 1939.

From 1932, he assisted his father Pavlo Skoropadskyi in leading the Hetmanite movement. In 1948, after the death of his father, Skoropadskyi became the leader of the Hetmanite movement as pretender to the throne.

Skoropadskyi was engaged on 13 February 1957 to Halyna Melnyk-Kaluzhynska; however, he died a week and a half after allegedly being poisoned by agents of the KGB in an operation to eliminate Ukrainian independence leaders. He is alleged to have had a child out of wedlock with Olesya Tuhai-Bei, although this has never been proven.

== Personal life ==
His fiancée Halyna Kaluzhynska was born in Volhynia near Trostianka in 1914. After World War I, she lived in Warsaw. She later married changed her surname name to Melnyk-Kaluzhynska. After World War II, Kaluzhynska relocated to the United Kingdom along with many other displaced persons. She met Skoropadsky through a mutual friend.

== Sources ==
- Тамара Ралдугіна. Штрихи до портрета спадкоємця останнього гетьмана України Данила Скоропадського (1904–1957 рр.) (Tamara Ralduhina. The portrait of heir of the last Hetman of Ukraine Danylo Skoropadskyi) – Ukrainian historic journal. 2004. No. 6 ISSN 0130-5247

Danylo Skoropadskyi Family of Skoropadsky Born: 13 February 1904 Died: 23 February 1957
Titles in pretence
Preceded by Oleksandra Skoropadska	Hetman of all Ukraine; 1948–1957	Succeeded by Maria Montrezor (claims)
