= Ivan Skoropadsky =

Hetman of the Zaporizhian Host (1646–1722)

- Іван Скоропадський
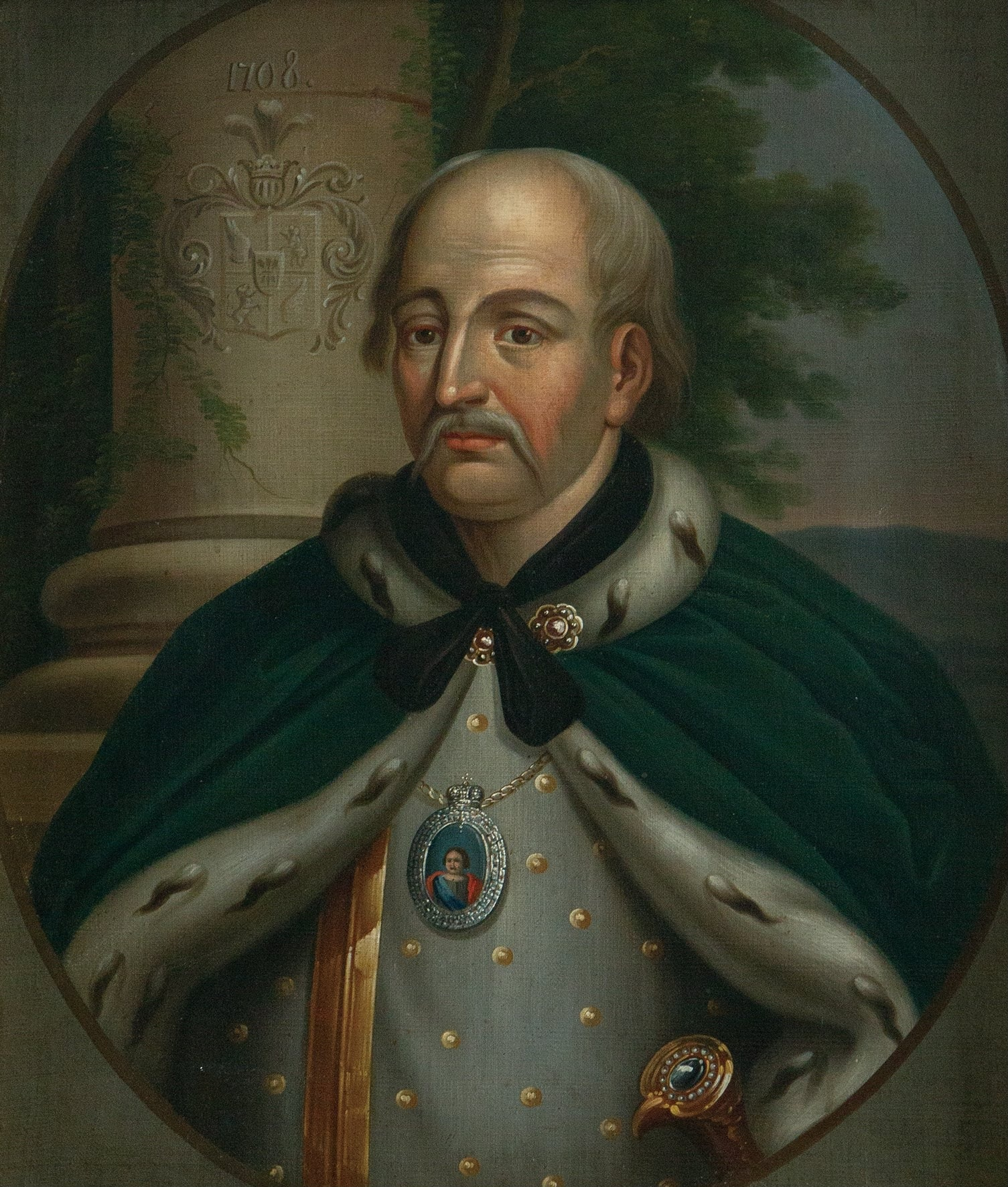
- Portrait, 1840s

Hetman of the Zaporizhian Host
- In office 11 November 1708 – 14 July 1722
- Preceded by: Ivan Mazepa
- Succeeded by: Pavlo Polubotok (acting); Danylo Apostol

Personal details
- Born: 1646 Humań, Bratslav Voivodeship, Polish–Lithuanian Commonwealth (now Uman, Ukraine)
- Died: 3 July 1722 (aged 75–76) Hlukhiv, Kiev Governorate, Russian Empire
- Spouse: Anastasia Markovych
- Education: Kyiv-Mohyla Academy
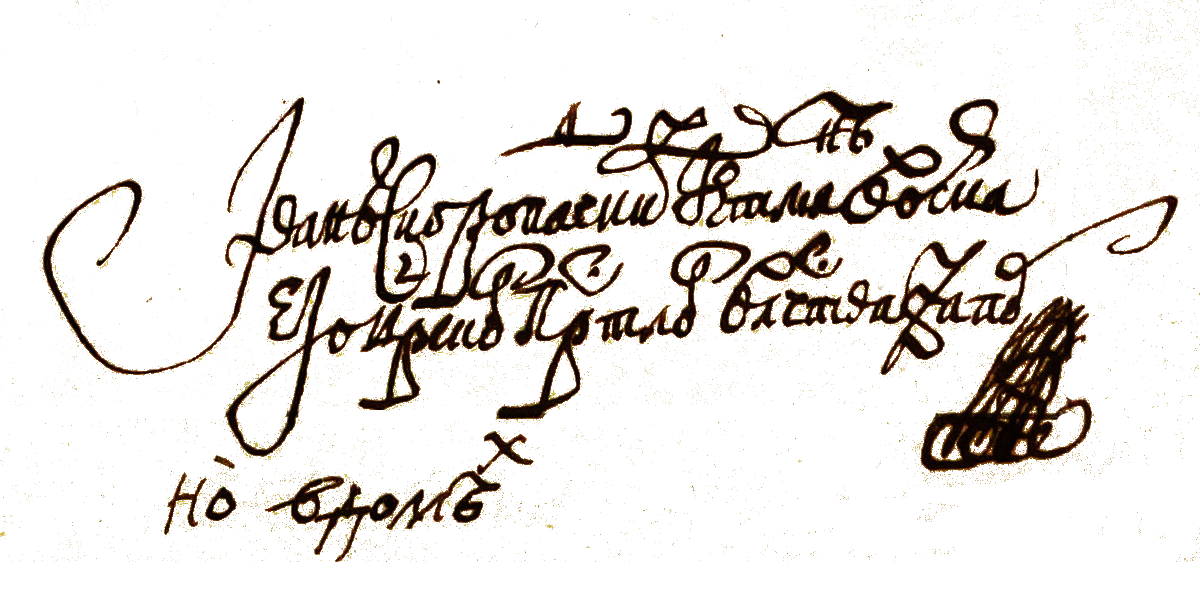
- Signature

Ivan Skoropadsky (Old Ukrainian: Иоан(ъ) Скоропадский; Ukrainian: Іван Скоропадський; Polish: Iwan Skoropadski; 1646 – 3 July [O.S. 22 June] 1722) served as Hetman of the Zaporizhian Host from 1708 to 1722, succeeding Ivan Mazepa after the latter's alliance with Sweden during the Great Northern War. Elected at the insistence of tsar Peter I, who considered him a weaker politician than other members of the Cossack elite, Skoropadsky presided over the Hetmanate during a period when its autonomy was increasingly limited by the Russian government. After his death, control over affairs in Ukraine was transferred to the Collegium of Little Russia.

== Biography ==
Ivan Skoropadsky
- Coat of arms
- Noble family: Skoropadsky family

=== Career before hetmanship ===
Born into a noble Cossack family in Umań, Podolia, Polish–Lithuanian Commonwealth, in 1646, Skoropadsky was educated in Kyiv-Mohyla Academy. In 1674 he moved to Left-bank Ukraine, and for the next two years worked in the chancellery of its hetman Ivan Samoylovych, representing his government during dipolmatic missions to Moscow. Between 1681 and 1694 Skoropadsky served as chancellor of the Chernihiv Regiment. He distinguished himself in Russo-Turkish War of 1676–1681 and once again in the Crimean expedition against the Ottoman Empire and Crimean Khanate in 1688, and in 1698 was appointed to the position of bunchuk general. Under the hetmanship of Ivan Mazepa Skoropadsky took part in diplomatic missions to Poland, Moscow and Zaporozhian Sich, and represented the Cossack Hetmanate in negotiations with the Russian Tsar Peter the Great.

During the Great Northern War, in 1706 Mazepa appointed Skoropadsky colonel of the Starodub Regiment. Despite being a close associate and, possibly, planned successor of the hetman, after the Swedish army crossed into Ukraine in 1708, Skoropadsky remained with his regiment in the territory controlled by Peter's forces, as a result of which he was unable to join Mazepa's alliance with the Swedes. As a result, only about 3,000 Cossacks, mostly Zaporozhians, followed Mazepa, while others remained loyal to the Tsar. The fear of reprisals and suspicion of Mazepa's newfound Swedish ally Charles XII prevented most of Ukraine's population from siding with the rebels.

=== Hetman ===
On 17 (O.S. 6) November 1708, one day after Mazepa's effigy had been publicly hanged in Hlukhiv, Skoropadsky was elected the new hetman at a starshyna rada held in the city in presence of the tsar. His election was seen as a mere formality after the alternative candidature of Chernihiv colonel Pavlo Polubotok was declined by Peter I, who saw Skoropadsky as a less cunning politician. Six days after Skoropadsky's election, an anathema was proclaimed against his predecessor by the Russian Orthodox Church.

Despite his agreement to appoint Skoropadsky as hetman, Peter I never fully trusted him, refused to confirm the new treaty with Moscow proposed by the Ukrainian side in 1709 in Reshetylivka, and postponed the provision of a charter formally installing the new hetman until 1710. Following Skoropadsky's election, 10 dragoon regiments of the Russian army were placed in Ukraine on a constant basis, with costs for their cantonment being paid by the local population. The Cossack army was transferred under the command of Russian generals, and its artillery was transported to Moscow. The Hetmanate's capital was moved from Baturyn, which had been razed by the Russian army after Mazepa's defection, to the town of Hlukhiv, where a special envoy of the tsar was tasked with overseeing the hetman and giving him "advice" on all issues.

During Skoropadsky's tenure, Russian authorities, represented in Ukraine by Kiev governor Dmitry Golitsyn, worked to establish greater control over the Hetmanate's elite. According to a decree from 1715, the hetman was allowed to appoint colonels only after getting approval from the tsar's representative. Several figures of non-Ukrainian origin were also incorporated into the starshyna class of the Hetmanate during that time. Russian authorities increasingly limited trade contacts of Ukrainian lands with Western Europe, Black Sea region and Zaporozhian Sich, the development of local industry was slowed down, and the economy and finances of the Hetmanate increasingly came under control of Russian merchants. In 1720 Peter I outlawed Ukrainian printing.

Skoropadsky wished to regain Peter's trust and yet negotiate greater autonomy for the Hetmanate and greater rights for the Cossack nobility, often resisting Peter the Great's policy of incorporation of the Hetmanate's lands into the Russian Empire. His careful negotiations allowed him to achieve both, and the Hetmanate regained much of its lost prominence. At the same time, the work of his government was hindered by the mass repressions organized by the tsar against the former supporters of Mazepa and their families. Confiscation of properties owned by Cossacks suspected of disloyalty to Peter led to the establishment of huge latifundia held by the tsar's close allies, such as Alexander Menshikov. Numerous Cossacks were also recruited to work on the construction of fortifications and canals by the tsarist government.

In 1718 Skoropadsky's daughter married Count Pyotr Petrovich Tolstoy, the son of prominent Russian statesman Pyotr Andreyevich Tolstoy, as a result of which the hetman was granted numerous estates in Ukraine, becoming its largest landowner. Ivan Skoropadsky died on 14 (O.S. 3) July 1722 and was buried in the Hamaliivka Monastery near Hlukhiv. The hetman had no male children, and following his death rule over the Hetmanate passed to the Collegium of Little Russia.

== Legacy ==
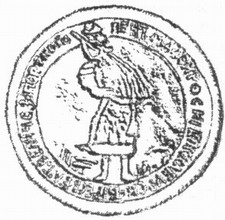
Seal of Skoropadsky as Hetman of Zaporozhian Host

Ukrainian historian Oleksander Ohloblyn positively evaluated Skoropadsky's attempts to defend the interests of the Hetmanate, which included protests against pressure from the Russian government and its officials and condemnation of the plans to establish the Collegium of Little Russia. According to him, the hetman had no power to influence Peter I, who had taken a firm decision to liquidate the Cossack autonomy after Mazepa's defection to the Swedes. Despite the official propaganda depicting Mazepa as a traitor, Skoropadsky remained respectful to his predecessor, as demonstrated by the texts of his universals. Mazepa's followers, in their turn preserved a positive attitude to Skoropadsky, with Pylyp Orlyk calling him a "dear friend" in his diary.

Pavlo Skoropadsky, a descendant of Ivan's brother, briefly ruled Ukraine in 1918, and also carried the title of hetman in his Hetmanate-influenced government. During Pavlo Skoropadsky's tenure, the anathema against Mazepa, which had been introduced shortly after Ivan Skoropadsky's election, was overturned.

== See also ==
- Hetmans of Ukrainian Cossacks
- Skoropadsky family
