= Royal crown =

Royal crown may refer to

- Crown, a traditional symbolic form of headgear worn by a monarch.
- RC Cola, an American brand of cola-flavored soft drink.
