= Anastasia Markovych =

Ukrainian Hetmana

Anastasia Markovich Анастасія Скоропадська
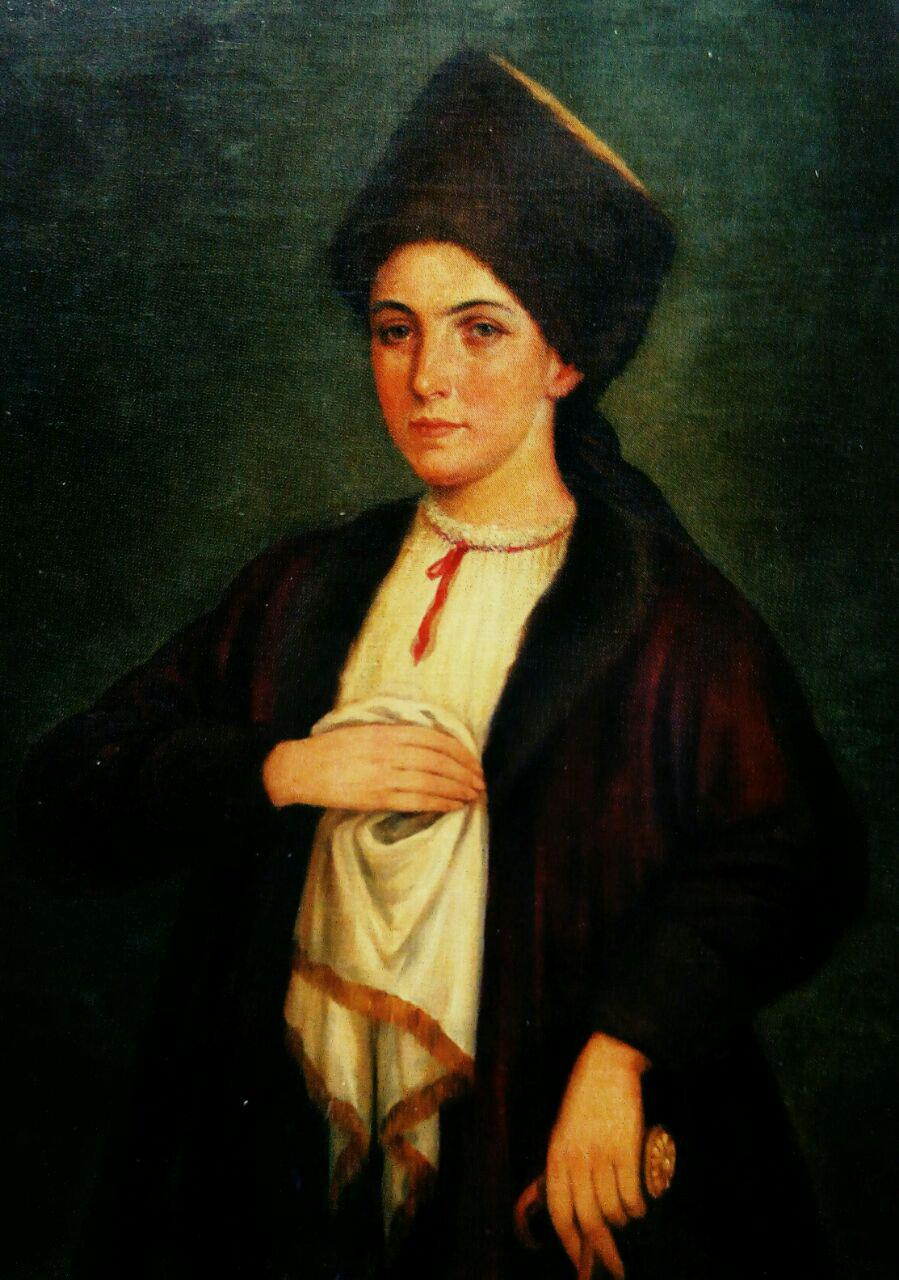
- An early 20th-century fancy portrait of Anastasia Markovych

Personal details
- Born: Анастасія Маркович c. 1671
- Died: 1729 Glukhov, Cossack Hetmanate, Russian Empire
- Resting place: Gamalievskiy (Hamaliivka) Convent
- Spouse(s): Kostiantyn Holub; Ivan Skoropadsky
- Children: Evdokia Holub; Ulyana Skoropadska
- Relatives: Yakiv Markovych (brother)

Anastasiya Markovych (died 1729), was a wife of Ivan Skoropadsky, Hetman of Zaporizhian Host (r. 1708–1722). She acted as the trusted political adviser of her spouse and wielded great influence within the affairs of state, particularly in connection with the foreign policy toward Russia, which was well known and became the subject of a Ukrainian saying.

== Biography ==
Anastasia was a daughter of Marko Avramovych, a rich arendator of Jewish origin, who resided in Pryluky, later moving to Pyriatyn. Her family belonged to Cossack starshyna. Anastasia's first husband was Kostiantyn Holub, general bunchuzhny and brother-in-law of hetman Ivan Samoilovych. Around 1700 she became the second wife of Ivan Skoropadsky. Energetic and authoritative, Anastasia had a big influence on her husband and frequently intervened in the affairs of hetman's government. Using her connections in the Russian elite, she worked to increase the size of her estates and supported her numerous relatives.

Anastasia's brother Andriy (c. 1674 - 1747) was a distinguished military fellow and supporter of Ivan Mazepa, but later switched to the Russian side, for which he was awarded large estates and the post of Hlukhiv sotnyk. After Andriy was blamed of corruption and removed from his position in 1727, Anastasia supported him in court despite the opposition of hetman Danylo Apostol, leading to his reinstatement and eventual promotion to the post of chief treasurer.

== Issue ==
Evdokia, Anastasia's daughter from the fist marriage, became the wife of general judge Ivan Charnysh. Her second daughter Uliana was married to count Pyotr Tolstoy, colonel of Nizhyn.
