= Hetman of all Ukraine =

1918 leader of the Ukrainian State

- Гетьман усієї України
- Coat of arms of the Ukrainian State

- Personal standard

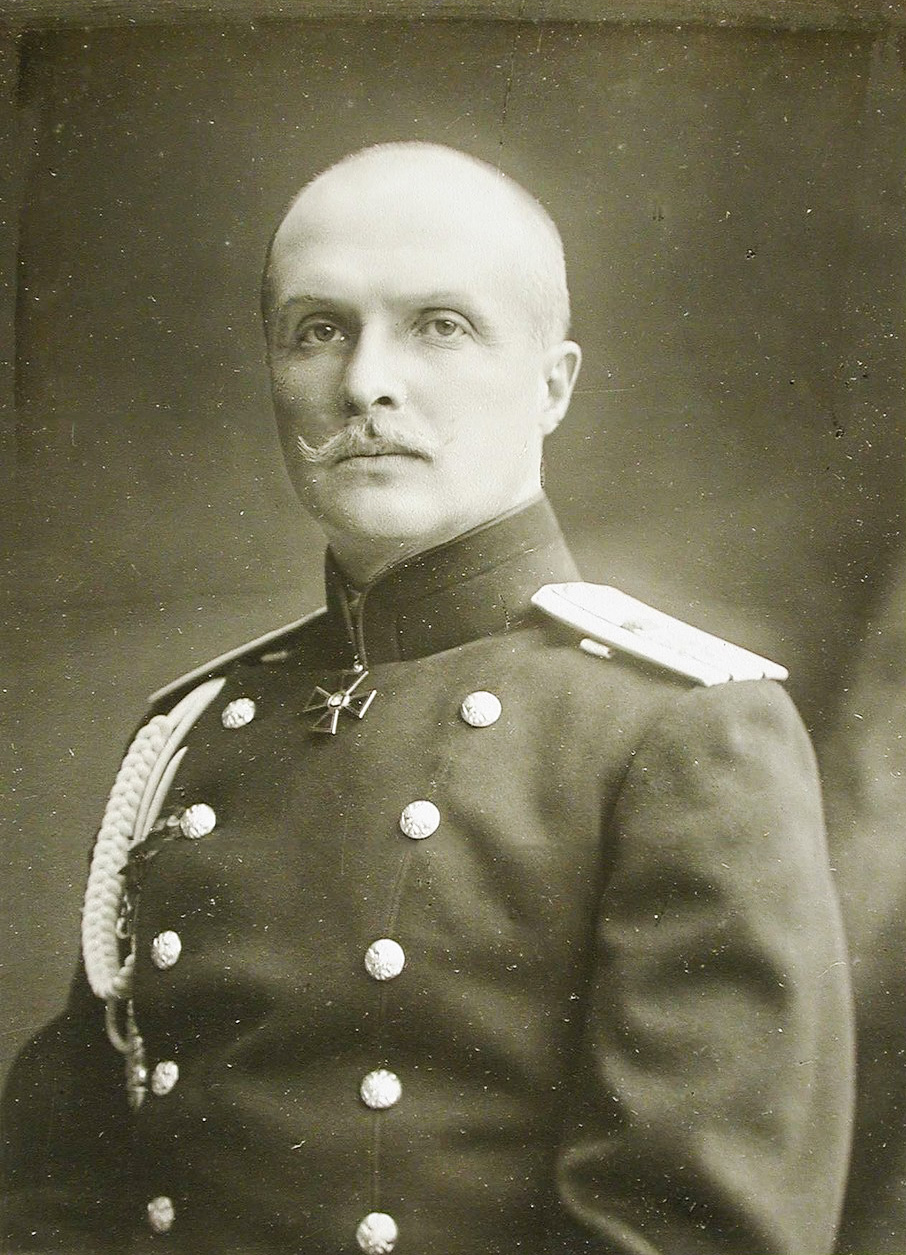
- Only officeholder Pavlo Skoropadskyi; 29 April 1918 – 14 December 1918
- Residence: Hetman Palace, Kyiv
- Nominator: All-Ukrainian Agrarian Congress
- Precursor: Chairman of the Central Rada
- Formation: 29 April 1918
- Abolished: 14 December 1918
- Succession: Chairman of the Directory

The Hetman of all Ukraine (Ukrainian: Гетьман усієї України, romanized: Hetman usiiei Ukrainy) was the head of state and commander-in-chief of the Ukrainian State in 1918.

== History ==
The position of Hetman of the Zaporizhian Host, also known as the "Hetman of all Ukraine", was established in 1648 during the Khmelnytsky Uprising and first held by Bohdan Khmelnytsky as the leader of the Cossack Hetmanate. During that period, the office was an elected position. Later in the late 18th century, it was abolished by the Russian government during the expansion of the Russian territory towards the Black Sea coast.

The position of Hetman of all Ukraine was established in 1918 by Pavlo Skoropadskyi, a descendant of the former hetman of the Zaporizhian Host Ivan Skoropadskyi. The Law on the Provisional State System of Ukraine was announced at the session of the Central Council of Ukraine on 29 April 1918, which laid a legal groundwork for the new position. Pavlo Skoropadskyi transformed Ukraine into the autocratic Ukrainian State under the protection of the Central Powers, while expelling the Bolshevik forces of Soviet Russia. During his term, the Communist Party was prohibited on the territory of Ukraine for the first time. After the uprising led by the Directorate of Ukraine, Pavlo Skoropadskyi surrendered the title on 14 December 1918, transferring the state power to the Cabinet of Ministers of Ukraine and going into exile to Germany.

After the establishment of Soviet Ukraine, members of the Skoropadskyi family established the Hetmanite movement that sought the recreation of the office with a royal house.

== Reign ==
No.	Hetman	Reign	Birth	Death	Marriage	Dynasty
1	Pavlo Skoropadskyi	29 April 1918 – 14 December 1918	15 May 1873, Wiesbaden	26 April 1945, Metten	Oleksandra Skoropadska (Durnovo)	House of Skoropadskyi

== See also ==
- List of leaders of Ukraine
- Hetmans of Ukrainian Cossacks
