= List of humanitarian aid to Ukraine during the Russo-Ukrainian war =

Russia Ukraine Countries sending foreign aid, including humanitarian aid to Ukraine

This is a list of known humanitarian aid, that has and will be provided to Ukraine during the Russo-Ukrainian War. This list does not include financial support to the Ukrainian government unless earmarked for humanitarian purposes.

== Aid by nation ==
=== Sovereign countries ===
Country	Humanitarian aid (including earmarked funds)
Albania	€1 million humanitarian aid was provided directly by the Government of the Republic of Albania to the Government of Ukraine.
Andorra	€100,953 contribution to the Council of Europe Action Plan for Ukraine “Resilience, Recovery and Reconstruction.
Argentina	The Argentine Government has sent the following humanitarian aid to Ukraine: Aid to refugees: A special deployment of the White Helmets humanitarian taskforce, to help provide assistance to refugees on the Ukrainian-Polish border.; The White Helmets humanitarian taskforce has already donated 25 tonnes of food and other supplies for Ukrainian refugees.; Humanitarian visa.(April 2023); Supplies: 1,500 t (1,500 long tons; 1,700 short tons) of foodstuffs, medicine and clothing, as of 4 March 2022.; Twelve shipments of supplies through the White Helmets Argentine Agency for International Cooperation and Humanitarian Assistance worth $300,000. (February 2023).; 2.5 tonnes of blankets, coats and first aid kits. (March 2023); 5.5 tons of blankets, clothing, diapers, first aid supplies and disposable tableware (March to April 2023).
Armenia	Supplies: 1,050+ smartphones, tablets and laptops for primary schoolchildren delivered by Anna Hakobyan, the wife of the current Prime Minister Nikol Pashinyan, at the Ministry of Education and Science of Ukraine in Kyiv in September 2023.; Over 10 tons of medicine donated to the Ukrainian National Military Medical Clinical Centre 9 February 2024.
Australia	Humanitarian aid: A$35 million in humanitarian aid on 1 March 2022; A$30 million on 20 March 2022: A$10 million to various non-government organisations; A$10 million to the UN Office for the Coordination of Humanitarian Affairs Ukraine fund; Supplies: A$10 million to the World Food Programme; A$2 million to the Emergency Action Alliance Ukraine Appeal; Medical aid: A$8 million to the United Nations Population Fund; Aid for energy: At least 70,000 tons of thermal coal for Ukrainian power stations on 20 March 2022; €24,490,000 contribution to the Ukraine Energy Support Fund.; Reconstruction A$66 million to the European Bank of Reconstruction and Development to assist in reconstruction in Ukraine. Aid to refugees: 6,000 Ukrainians have been granted Humanitarian visas. (April 2022); Over 8,000 relief items, such as blankets, hygiene and kitchen sets, and lighting for Ukrainian refugees facing cold temperatures, in co-operation with the United Kingdom. (March 2022); In total Australia has given A$65 million in humanitarian aid (as of 26 April 2022).
Austria	Medical aid: 500,000 vaccine doses (August 2021).; Supplies: €17.5 million from the Foreign Disaster Fund which include, emergency vehicles and fuel.; Evacuation: Evacuation of 5 children with cancer from Lviv.; Evacuation of 270 vulnerable people from Ukraine.; Humanitarian aid: €41 million of humanitarian aid through the Nachbar in Not aid campaign.; €570 million worth of humanitarian aid was donated by the Austrian state from 24 January to 20 November 2022.; €2 million to Humanitarian projects in Ukraine.; Two ambulances donated to the State Emergency Service of Ukraine.; €5 million to World Food Programme demining of Ukrainian farmland.; Additional €5 million for the demining of Ukrainian farmland March 2025.; €3 million to humanitarian efforts for Ukrainians in Ukraine and Moldova by the International Committee of the Red Cross, UNICEF and UNFPA.; €2 million to help export Ukrainian grain to the Middle East.; €15.5 million contribution to the Ukraine Energy Support Fund.; €3 million in winter aid through the ICRC, UNICEF and UNHCR January 2026.
Azerbaijan	$45 million in humanitarian aid provided as of April 2026: Humanitarian aid: €5 million of medical supplies and equipment.; Free fuel for ambulances and vehicles of the State Emergency Service at SOCAR petrol stations.; On 5 July 2022, Azerbaijan delivered 47,000 tons of humanitarian aid consisting of canned food, baby food, clothing and medicine bound for Cherkasy through Poland.; $360,000 of medicines. (March 2023); 23 trucks worth of humanitarian aid, including 900,000 Metres of electrical cable and 18 transformers and transformer substations.; One Revival P mechanized demining machine provided to the Ukrainian State Emergency services.; 25 containers of energy equipment delivered to Ukraine January 2024.; 1585 tonnes of energy equipment including 51 power transformers and 111 transformer substations donated to Ukraine as of January 2024.; $3 million allocated for the purchase and delivery of Azerbaijani manufactured electrical equipment for Ukraine.; €1 million of energy equipment delivered January 2026 including 12 low voltage distribution panels, 11 generators, five transformers and 27,000 metres of cables.; $1.47 million of electrical equipment donated October 2026.; Five passenger buses donated to Ukraine.; Aid to refugees: 29 tons of humanitarian aid to Ukrainian refugees in Moldova.; Evacuation: Evacuation of 90 children.; Recovery programs for over 500 Ukrainian children in Azerbaijan.
Bahrain	King Hamad announced the provision of relief aid worth US$1 million to civilian refugees from Ukraine and other nationalities on 21 March 2022.
Belgium	Supplies: £3 million to the International Committee of the Red Cross which will send medicine, water and, food to Mariupol and Kyiv. (March 2022); The Belgian First Aid and Support Team has sent generators, tents, blankets, hygiene kits, kitchen sets, camp beds, feminine hygiene products, milk powder and layers. Moldova has been given tents, generators and hygiene kits. The total value of the humanitarian material delivered by B-FAST now amounts to approximately 1.1 million euros. To Ukraine, Slovakia and Poland. (March 2022); The FPS Public Health has commissioned B-FAST to ship medical equipment worth just over 3 million euros. (March 2022); €800,000 worth of medical equipment, basic supplies, and medicines.(June 2022); Humanitarian aid: €69 million in humanitarian aid in January 2023.; £2 million to the United Nations Office for the Coordination of Humanitarian Affairs (March 2022).; Eight ambulances and five fire engines donated by Brussels Fire Brigade.; Miscellaneous aid: 3,000 tons of salt to deice public roads in the current winter conditions in January 2023.; Reconstruction aid: In November 2022, a new aid package of €29 million is announced to help with education in Ukraine, rebuild medical infrastructure and support the "Grain From Ukraine program". Then, the total humanitarian aid reached 61.5 million.; €150 million pledged to finance energy and infrastructure reconstruction projects in Ukraine 17 July 2024.; €9 million to the United Nations Development Programme Ukraine Green Energy Recovery Program.; €150 million in technical assistance pledged for restoration and reconstruction of Ukraine through the BE-Relieve Ukraine project lasting until the end of 2028 announced April 2025.; Aid to refugees: €800 million for Ukraine and Ukrainian refugees.; Energy aid: 36 tons of equipment sent to Ukraine in order to restore energy infrastructure (March 2023).; €2.5 million contribution to the Ukraine Energy Support Fund.
Bosnia and Herzegovina	Supplies: 20 tons of humanitarian aid was collected in March and sent from Sarajevo on 11 April 2022.; Humanitarian aid: £150,000 worth of humanitarian aid from the Bosnian Red Cross (March 2022).
Brazil	Supplies: The Brazilian Air Force donated 11.6 tons of food, water purifiers and medicine from humanitarian aid that was destined to Warsaw, Poland, while rescuing Brazilians who are leaving the European country.; Aid to refugees: The president Jair Bolsonaro announced the grant of humanitarian visas to Ukrainian refugees in March 2022.
Bulgaria	Supplies: Unspecified number of clothes, shoes, tents, sheets, blankets.; 350 medical kits, 5000 sets of winter clothes and 5000 winter shoes.; Bulgarian fundraising campaign for humanitarian aid by the Bulgarian Red Cross in co-operation with the Bulgarian government has raised £470,000 for humanitarian aid in 3 days. The cargo includes warm clothes and blankets, winter footwear, bed linen and hygiene products.; Equipment: 2,000 helmets and 2,000 bulletproof vests (for civilian purposes only).; Humanitarian aid: £706,000 of humanitarian aid (April 2022); Aid to refugees: £181,000 to support Ukrainian refugees.
Canada	Humanitarian aid: CAN $25 million donated in February 2022, including 10 million for the Canadian Red Cross.; CAN $10 million additional funds towards the response to the Destruction of the Kakhovka Dam and CAN 265,500 towards mental health charities for Ukrainians announced on 10 June 2023.; 10 flatbed 4x4 trucks with mounted cranes donated to the State Emergency Service of Ukraine for explosive ordinances disposal.; CAN $300,000 to the International Transport Forum to help rebuild Ukrainian road and rail networks.; €5 million in funding for the International Chernobyl Cooperation Account.; CAN$51.1 million funding for several humanitarian projects announced April 2026.; CAN$40.1 million funding in support of Ukrainian veterans and their families.; Supplies: An additional of CAN$100 million transferred in March 2022 for the basic needs of Ukrainians.; $2 million for the completion of a dairy processing plant in Western Ukraine to support food security efforts; $500 million to the Ukraine Sovereignty Bond which will assist with pensions, fuel and restoring energy infrastructure (November 2022).; Energy aid: CAN$115 million to fund the repairs of the electric grid of Ukraine, announced on 13 December 2022.; 7 electrical transformers to help restore Ukraine's energy system, announced by the Foreign Ministry in March 2023.; CAN$20 million to help repair Ukraine's energy infrastructure announced June 2024.; CAN$50 million to help repair Ukraine's energy infrastructure announced February 2025.; €57,199,461 contribution to the Ukraine Energy Support Fund.; Economic aid: CAN$2.5 billion in economic aid to Ukraine over 2026.
Chile	Humanitarian aid: On 24 March 2022, the Minister of Foreign Affairs of Chile, Antonia Urrejola, announced that, at the instruction of President Gabriel Boric, an urgent shipment of US$100,000 will be made for humanitarian aid to Ukraine. This money will come from the Chile Fund against Hunger and Poverty, which will be channelled through the International Federation of the Red Cross.
China	Supplies: The Chinese Foreign Minister, Wang Yi, said on 9 March that the Chinese Red Cross would provide humanitarian assistance worth ¥5 million RMB ($791,540) to Ukraine, consisting of daily necessities.; Humanitarian aid: Additional ¥10 million RMB ($1.57 million) of humanitarian assistance offered on 21 March 2022.
Colombia	On 24 March, Colombian president Ivan Duque announced a humanitarian aid donation, channeled through the United Nations High Commissioner for Refugees, destined for Ukrainian refugees.
Croatia	Aid to refugees: On 3 March 2022, Government of Croatia approved 1.8 million kn ($264,000/€238,000) of urgent humanitarian aid to Moldova, to help Ukrainian refugees. This aid includes electricity aggregators, tents, blankets, and masks.; On 9 April 2022, Prime Minister Andrej Plenković pledged an additional €100 million to support Ukrainian refugees currently seeking refuge in Croatia.; £4.79 million for the cost of health services for Ukrainian refugees in Croatia.; £863,000 for active employment policies for Ukrainian refugees in Croatia.; £200,000 for Ukrainian students in Croatia.; £340,000 for transportation for refugees in the country.; Humanitarian aid: On 17 March 2022, The Croatian Medical Chamber (HLK) donated 300,000 kn in humanitarian aid to buy medical products and equipment for Ukrainian people and doctors.; As of 23 February 2023, Croatia donated €37 million of humanitarian aid to Ukraine.; On 31 July 2023 Croatia donated €1 million to the World Food Programme project to demine Ukrainian farmland.; €2.5 million contribution to the Ukraine Energy Support Fund.; 100 mobile metal-cutting machines along with pumps, transformers and other energy equipment.
Cyprus	Humanitarian aid: 150 tonnes of humanitarian aid on 8 March 2022.; 215 tonnes of humanitarian aid on 5 April 2022.; Energy aid: €300,000 grant for the purchase of generators through Poland for the energy needs of Ukraine (on 13 December 2022). The humanitarian aid sent by Cyprus reached €3 million.
Czech Republic	Government of the Czech Republic approved humanitarian aid including. Supplies: 113.1 million crowns for the financing of community soup kitchens and the transport of humanitarian aid.; Aid to refugees: 1.5 billion crowns ($66 million) to provide refugees with accommodation, food and hygiene products.; €22 million to Ukraine and Ukrainian refugees in Moldova.; 70 million crowns for hot meals, hygiene products and school supplies for refugees in Moldova.; Humanitarian aid: 300 million crowns ($13.2 million) for humanitarian aid for civilians in Ukraine.; €18 million in humanitarian aid; 70 million crowns for shelters; 13 water treatment plants from the Czech-Taiwan project to provide water to villages around the city of Kryvyi Rih.; 25 mobile water purification stations donated to Dnipro Oblast.; 12 school bonuses donated to Kyiv Oblast by the Central Bohemian Region of the Czech Republic.; Energy aid: £5 million for electricity and heat during the blackout.; £2.5 million for indestructible centers.; 68 million crowns for the purchase of propane butane heaters (including propane butane bottles), energy-saving appliances and repairs to damaged energy infrastructure.; Generators; Medical aid: £1 million to back doctors.; 101.5 million crowns for material and medical equipment.
Denmark	Aid to refugees: 25 million Danish Krone to the United Nations High Commissioner for Refugees for necessities for Ukrainian refugees in Moldova [November 2022]; Medical aid: DKK 100 million worth of medicine and medical equipment requested by Ukraine (among others, anaesthesia, antibiotics, analgesic drugs and protective medical equipment), as well as 1,700 treatments against tetanus on 3 March 2022 requested via WHO.; 5 ambulances from the Region of Southern Denmark; 1 mobile hospital.; DKK 50 million for medicines and medical equipment for Ukraine and neighboring countries.; 18 Mercedes-Benz Sprinter ambulances with medical supplies to Kharkiv; 40,000 visors; DKK 6,7 Million worth of face masks.; A total of 1600,000 Smocks.; DKK 7.2 Million Worth of gloves.; 5000 FFP3 respirators.; 11.4 million gloves; Financial aid: DKK 150 million for supporting the Ukrainian public sector, such as wages for teachers and medical staff.; DKK 252 million ($30 million) of economic support provided by Denmark via the World Bank on 1 October 2022.; Reconstruction aid: DKK 265 million (€36 million) on 21 December 2022 for infrastructure repairs and basic humanitarian aid during the winter of 2022–23.; DKK400 million by Danish companies to rebuild Ukraine.; $47 million to reconstruction projects in Mykolaiv Oblast.; €40 million allocated to support the private sector involved in Ukrainian reconstruction.; ₴6 million of facilities, equipment and generators provided to police in Mykolaiv Oblast jointly provided with the UNDP.; Energy aid: 1,000 generators, 50 systems for desalinating water, 50 pumps for water and central heating.; More than 40 tonnes of energy and water equipment including: 4 electrical transformers, relay protection, steel wire, water pumps, heat exchangers, and water tanks.; €83,953,842 contribution to the Ukraine Energy Support Fund.; €380 million in support of renewable energy infrastructure.; DKK 130 million in energy infrastructure aid announced 23 September 2024.; Humanitarian aid: DKK1.2 billion towards civilian aid.; DKK 380 million for mine clearance, rehousing of internally displaced (including temporary housing units sent from Denmark), food security, clean water, securing access to schools for children, and similar things.; 98,600,000 Danish krone By Danish civil societies; 15 vehicles to support disabled people who are survivors of gender based violence [May 2023]; DKK 250 million in humanitarian aid announced 7 May 2024.; 18 rescue trucks with 45 metre lifts donated to the State Emergency Service of Ukraine October 2024.; Three generator with a combined 326kW capacity and a 1,455kW boiler house February 2026.; DKK 1.4 billion (€190 million) of financial and humanitarian aid was provided from February 2022 to January 2023,
Estonia	Energy aid: 11 busses with generators and electrical accessories December 2022; €2,745,000 to the Ukraine Energy Support Fund.; A power unit from the Estonian Auverskaia power plant pledged December 2024.; Humanitarian aid: £120,000 to help the displaced population in the conflict zone of the war, this aid includes generators, air heaters, air conditioners, sleeping bags, and hospital beds [January 2015].; As of 8 April 2022, 344 tons of non-military relief supplies.; Various medical and humanitarian aid, including 15 tons of food aid provided by 15 March 2022 and 45 ambulances provided by 17 April 2022; Total €24,753,085 for Development Cooperation and Humanitarian Aid in 2021–22 financed by Ministry of Foreign Affairs / Estdev; As of 17 April 2022, 8 shipments of rescue equipment (including 10 firefighter and rescue vehicles and 16 all-terrain vehicles). Subsequent shipments will involve bigger technology.; €1 million to support climate projects in Ukraine.; €400,000 humanitarian aid January 2026.; €340,000 winter aid for frontline regions August 2026.; Two shipping containers of personal protective equipment, firefighting equipment, generators and a mini tractor donated to Ukrainian by Estonian Rescue Services Agency.; Vehicles: At least 30 Iveco Crossway buses pledged to Bucha and other Ukrainian cities on 13 June 2022.; 27 buses to help to restore the transport system [November 2022]; 4 buses donated to go to Zhytomyr and Kharkiv oblasts [November 2023].; 5 ambulances donated to Ukraine by the Tallinn Ambulance Service August 2024.; Aid to refugees: €25.4 million to support Ukrainian refugees (March 2023).; €650,000 in humanitarian aid primarily towards refugees in Georgia, education support and children.; Reconstruction: Over €50 million allocated for reconstruction projects in Zhytomyr Oblast.
Finland	Between 2014 and 2021, Finland allocated €70 million to support Ukraine. Additional €14 million in February 2022. Humanitarian aid provided through the EU Civil Protection Mechanism: 22 truckloads of emergency relief: Medicines and hospital supplies, including at least 2 modern field hospitals.; Emergency shelters and backup generators.; Rescue service material.; 13 ambulances and four fire engines.; Medical evacuation and treatment of patients from Ukraine.; €29 million of humanitarian aid, including 14 million for development cooperation (March 2023).; Nine additional emergency service vehicles delivered October 2023.; €3 million in additional support to improve food security through the World Food Programme November 2023. Total €11 million donated to support World Food Programme efforts in Ukraine since February 2022.; €20 million allocated to support Ukrainian education 2025–28.; €500,000 to the World Food Programme's school meals programme in Ukraine; €8.8 million to the Partnership Fund for a Resilient Ukraine; €16 million in humanitarian assistance through the United Nations and ICRC announced March 2025.; 52 generators and a further €22 million in humanitarian support announced February 2026.; Creation and leadership of an international coalition for bomb shelters for Ukraine announced March 2025.; 10 diesel locomotives.; €2 million winter humanitarian assistance and €3 million funding for the Ukraine Recovery Program October 2026.; €5 million to the Ukraine Energy Support Fund.
France	France has provided humanitarian aid, notably through the French Foreign Ministry's Crisis and Support Center as well as the EU Civil Protection Mechanism. It includes: 33 t (32 long tons; 36 short tons) of emergency equipment (500 family tents, 2300 blankets, 1000 hygiene kits, 2000 floor mats, 300 sleeping bags) delivered on 1 March 2022.; 37 t (36 long tons; 41 short tons) of humanitarian aid (500 tents, 1500 beds, 1500 sleeping bags, 25 large tents) delivered to Moldova to take in refugees fleeing the Russian invasion of Ukraine on 2 March 2022.; 8 t (7.9 long tons; 8.8 short tons) of medical supplies (1 mobile clinic composed of medicines and medical equipment, 36 containers of medication) delivered by 2 airplanes through Poland on 2 March 2022.; 4.23 t (4.16 long tons; 4.66 short tons) of medical equipment (batch of medicines, personal protective equipment, 27 respirators and associated equipment) delivered on 5 March 2022.; 3.4 t (3.3 long tons; 3.7 short tons) of medicines delivered on 7 March 2022.; 7.4 t (7.3 long tons; 8.2 short tons) of medicines delivered on 10 March 2022.; 9 t (8.9 long tons; 9.9 short tons) of emergency equipment (10,000 hygiene kits, 17 large-capacity generators) delivered to Moldova to take in refugees on 17 March 2022.; 55 t (54 long tons; 61 short tons) of emergency aid (10 oxygen generators, 9 tons of medicines, 31 generators including 6 high-capacity generator, 9 family tents to the Polish Red Cross, 8 tons of IT equipment, 4 tons of baby milk) delivered on 21 March 2022.; 21 new ambulances, 11 fire engines, 16 personal rescue vehicles and 49 tons of medical and emergency equipment (protective equipment, hand ladders, fire hoses...) dispatched by a convoy of 23 trucks and 100 firefighters and rescuers through Romania on 23 March 2022.; 2 blood collection lorries donated by the French blood agency delivered on 17 March 2022 and 25 March 2022.; Dispatch of a unit of 16 gendarmes and 2 forensic experts from the IRCGN with projectable genetic testing system to investigate and capture evidence of alleged war crimes in Ukraine by invading Russian forces since 11 April 2022.; 12 fire engines, 12 rescue vehicles and 50 tons of emergency equipment for search and rescue and firefighting delivered on 15 April 2022.; 28 t (28 long tons; 31 short tons) of medical equipment (1 oxygen generator, 50 sets of respiratory equipment, a second batch of respiratory equipment, 4.5 tons of medicines, a second batch of emergency medicines, 1 high capacity generator) delivered on 21 April 2022.; 6 new or recent firefighting vehicles, 6 new fire brigade ambulances, 1 medical vehicle equipped with a mobile radiology unit, 115 tons of equipment (including 36 km of fire hoses and 56,000 litres of foam) and 20,160 food rations delivered on 10 May 2022.; 800 t (790 long tons; 880 short tons) of humanitarian aid have been given as of 17 May 2022.; 12,000 IT equipment (4G routers, IP phones, desktop and laptop computers, servers, network and wifi equipment) delivered through Poland on 25 May 2022.; 600 t (590 long tons; 660 short tons) of potato plants donated by producers from the French Federation of Seed Potato Growers shipped and distributed directly to Ukrainian farmers between April and May 2022.; Evacuation and medical treatment of wounded Ukrainian soldiers. At least 3 operations were carried out (on 20 May 2022, 16 June 2022 and 17 June 2022) to evacuate 13 Ukrainian war wounded.; 1 mobile health post (equipped with medical supplies and medicines) and medical equipment used for anaesthesia and resuscitation delivered on 28 June 2022.; 2 mobile DNA analysis laboratory to help investigate Russian war crimes.; 10,000 laptops for Ukrainians doctors provided on 26 July 2022.; Help in mine clearance with the involvement of French specialists and equipment, training of Ukrainian to mine clearance of body water reported after a conference between the head of Chernihiv Oblast Military Administration Viacheslav and representatives of the French Embassy in Ukraine on 16 August 2022.; Dispatch of a new team of experts from the National Gendarmerie Criminal Research Institute (IRCGN) to investigate Russian war crimes in Izium on 27 September 2022.; 1,000 t (980 long tons; 1,100 short tons) of humanitarian goods (15 fire and rescue vehicles, 8 motorized semi-rigid watercraft, 19 tons of rescue, clearing and protective equipment, 25 tons of emergency medicine, 1 medical vehicle equipped with a mobile radiology device for carrying out examinations in the field, 60,000 food rations, 48 tons of prepared meals, 13 tons of milk, 5 generators, building materials, tarpaulins, 200 meters of emergency bridges including 3 prefabricated "Bailey" type bridges purchased from Cerema and 3 modular metal bridges purchased from the French company Matière) delivered on 28 September 2022.; 100 50-100 KWA generators delivered on 23 November 2022.; Two pilot ships to aid in the export of Ukrainian grain.; 28 generators donated to three hospitals in Chernihiv Oblast.; €5.71 million contribution to the Ukraine Energy Support Fund.; €60 million in support pledged to the Ukrainian energy sector 23 September 2024.; €40.6 million to the EBRD Chornobyl Fund to help repair the New safe confinement damaged by the Russian invasion.; €200 million to support projects for reconstruction and European market integration announced June 2025.; €70 million for the Ukrainian Critical Infrastructure Support Fund February 2026.; Six THeMIS ground drones modified for demining and donated to the Ukrainian Emergency Service.; 40 COLOSSUS firefighting robots purchased for the Ukrainian Emergency Service.; 68 106 kW solar power generators for critical infrastructure donated to Kyiv Oblast.; Six laparoscopic stands for Ukrainian children's hospitals.; €71 million in grant financial support pledged February 2026.; Eight 112kW generators donated by Paris City Hall.
Georgia	The Republic of Georgia has sent over 1,000 tons of humanitarian aid to Ukraine and shelters over 30,000 Ukrainian refugees as of 7 December 2022. The first 100 tons that were sent on 27 February 2022, included 30 types of medicines, oxygen concentrators, additional transfusion equipment and blood. On 6 March 2022, 40 tons of food, beverages, clothes, hygiene products and further medical supplies were delivered. Further 100 tons of non-perishable goods, basic necessities and more medicine were transported on 11 March 2022. Another 120 tons of aid went out on 28 March 2022, which initiated the second phase. A total of 100 tons were also donated by the Georgian Red Cross and Enterprise Georgia state programme on 14 and 30 March 2022 respectively. The Georgian government stated that it would continue mobilising humanitarian aid. On 7 December, Georgian Prime Minister Irakli Garibashvili stressed that his country would not get militarily involved in Ukraine, but continue to provide aid and that over 1,000 tons of humanitarian cargo were already delivered. Nine industrial generators donated to Sumy Oblast.
Germany	One mobile field hospital worth €5.3 million and associated training of medical staff in February 2022; One mobile field hospital in September 2022 in a joint project with Estonia; Evacuating and treating wounded Ukrainian soldiers in Germany since 2014; 50 Unimog medical transport vehicles.; 14 pallets of medical supplies.; €1.012 million for humanitarian help donated by private citizens in 2022. (The largest sum from individual donations collected for a single cause ever recorded, according to the German National Center for Social Question, DZI); 65 refrigerators for medical supplies; 1200 hospital beds; €430 million allocated for humanitarian aid (e.g. mine clearing projects) by the Ministry of Foreign Affairs; €10 million disaster relief; €185 million by the Ministry for Economic Cooperation and Development to support families displaced within Ukraine; €200 million package announced by German government to aid Internally displaced persons in Ukraine on 4 September 2022.; Nine generators provided to the city of Vinnytsia by the Ministry of foreign affairs 27 June 2023.; One bus converted into a mobile medical practise.; €20 million in humanitarian aid pledged to help Ukrainian civilians for winter pledged 11 September 2023.; 20 ambulances donated with the help of the World Health Organization.; Equipment donated to the Kherson Regional Universal Scientific Library including a braille printer and equipment for the visually impaired set to arrive in spring 2024.; Federal Agency for Technical Relief delivered five dump trucks, a tractor-trailer and two water tankers and relief supplies worth more than €1.7 million to Kharkiv Oblast on 27 February 2024.; 20 Toyota landcruisers donated to explosives technicians of the National Police of Ukraine.; Two Mercedes-Benz Arocs trucks equipped with cranes donated to the Ukrainian Ministry of Energy.; €10 million for the reconstruction of Okhmatdyt children's hospital and the treatment of child patients in Germany.; A convoy of eight firefighting vehicles, six water cannons and 15 tonnes of firefighting equipment dispatched by the State Fire Association of Bavaria August 2024.; Six large generators donated to Ukrainian hospital and water facilities announced 27 September 2024.; €200 million in humanitarian aid to provide for Ukrainian civilians during winter announced November 2024.; €2.4 million to support the United Nations Industrial Development Organization's Green industrial recovery programme for Ukraine.; €806,824,095 funding for the Ukraine Energy Support Fund.; €2 million in grants to support energy sustainability for Ukrainian small businesses in cooperation with Norway.; UAH 203.35 million in grants between 700 Ukrainian schools provided by the German Federal Ministry for Economic Cooperation and Development through the German Development Bank; 20 mobile clinics purchased by Deutsche Gesellschaft für Internationale Zusammenarbeit for six Ukrainian Oblasts with funding from the German government.; Two Mercedes-Benz Zetros trucks, a mini-excavator and a minibus donated to Zaporizhia Oblast by The German Federal Agency for Technical Assistance; Nine Volkswagen Amarok pickup trucks donated to Zaporizhia Oblast Regional Administration; Two backhoe excavators provided to Kharkiv Oblast for infrastructure repair.; Eight rescue and firefighting vehicles, four specialised cars an ATV and firefighting tools donated to the State Emergency Service by the German Federal Technical Assistance Agency May 2025.; One air foam fire engine provided to the city of Poltava.; 12 Mitsubishi pickup trucks and two road rollers donated to Kharkiv Oblast.; €5 million in funding for The Energy Efficiency Fund for Ukraine.; €3 million funding for the Food from Ukraine to Syria initiative.; €40 million in winter humanitarian aid to Ukraine announced November 2025.; 143 generators to the Ukrainian minister of health co funded with the European Union.; 33 mobile combined heat and power plants pledged January 2026.; Three minibuses and 10 pickup trucks donated to Ukrzaliznytsia.; 76 generators donated to Mykolaiv Oblast.; 12 Mitsubishi pickup trucks donated to Kherson Oblast emergency and utility services.; 10 sets of hydraulic rescue equipment for Ukrainian State Emergency Services.; €50 million funding to restore the Chernobyl New Safe Confinement damaged by Russia.; €1 additional funding for the International Atomic Energy Agency.; €5.7 million package for Ukrainian Emergency Services including firefighting robots, vehicles and equipment, busses, minibuses trucks and personal protective equipment.; Five pickup trucks and five vans provided to Ukrzaliznytsia for infrastructure repair.
Greece	50 t (49 long tons; 55 short tons) of humanitarian aid shipped on 13 April 2022, which includes food, water, medication and three generators. [2022]; Health supplies and equipment to assist Ukrainian refugees who are staying in neighbouring countries, primarily Moldova and Slovakia. The total expenditure for the aid is estimated at €6,811,642. [2022]; €200,000 was allocated to UNICEF for targeted support of children inside Ukraine, and €40,000 was channelled through UNHCR to aid the Moldovan government in accommodating Ukrainian refugees. [2022]; Medical equipment and personal protection material to support the population in Ukraine. [2022]; A Greek NGO delivered humanitarian aid shipments into the country, operated mobile medical units, rehabilitated and equipped hospitals, and partnered with local humanitarian organisations in Ukraine. [2022]; Rehabilitation of wounded Ukrainian soldiers in Greece [2023].; Four large transformers that convert high-voltage DC power generated by power stations into the lower AC voltage used by local distribution grids to supply households. [2024]; Ukraine is said to be interested in the electricity generators that are now idle in the coal-fired power stations that Greece has decommissioned. [2024]; Wounded Ukrainian soldiers visited and stayed in the monasteries of Mount Athos as part of a psychological support program, seeking solace in the peaceful environment there. [2024]
Hungary	28 t (28 long tons; 31 short tons) of food and 100,000 L (22,000 imp gal; 26,000 US gal) of vehicle fuel on 28 February 2022.; 500 litres of communion wine.; €570,000 worth of medical aid and €787,000 support for charity schemes in Transcarpathia; 60,000 servings of hot food served to refugees in Transcarpathia; €177,000 donation to the city of Berehove to help the city maintain its water supply; 200 ventilators, 250 patient monitors, 25 central monitors, 100 infusion pumps and 10,000 blood transfusion bags
Iceland	Ikr 510 million in humanitarian aid through international aid agencies.; Further Ikr 425 million in economic and humanitarian assistance pledged on 11 May 2022.; €8,946,766 million provided to the Ukraine Energy Support fund.
India	230 tonnes of humanitarian aid including medicines, medical equipment, tents, blankets and other relief materials as of 3 June 2022.; Additional humanitarian aid consisting of medicines and medical equipment delivered on 12 September 2022. 7.7 tons of aid were delivered.; More humanitarian aid pledged in April 2023, with India planning to send school buses.
Indonesia	Handed over medicine assistance to the Ukrainian Scientific and Practical Center of Endocrine Surgery, Transplantation of Endocrine Organs and Tissues in Kyiv, Ukraine.; The Indonesian government also provided additional aid to Ukraine through the Ukrainian Red Cross and expressed its commitment to assisting in reconstructing war-damaged hospitals.
Ireland	€20 million of humanitarian aid as of 14 April 2022, which include €4.3 million worth of medical supplies such as ambulances.; €25 million funding announced on 13 December 2022 by the Irish government to help with the reconstruction and development of Ukraine.; €40.3 million in humanitarian and development aid announced April 2026.; €450,000 towards a UN Food and Agriculture Organisation project to provide 500 tonnes of seed potatoes to 10,000 Ukrainian farmers.; €1 million in humanitarian aid to Ukraine following the Destruction of the Kakhovka Dam; A containerised water treatment plant capable of treating up to 40,000 litres of water per hour.; €1.5 million funding for the construction of 50 modular homes in Kyiv by the UN Refugee Agency.; €7 contribution to the EU for Ukraine fund supporting Ukrainian reconstruction and recovery.; €52 million contribution to the Ukraine Energy Support Fund.; €25 million allocated to protect and restore Ukrainian energy infrastructure July 2026.
Israel	100 tons of humanitarian aid, including medical supplies, water purification equipment, tents, blankets and warm clothing.; A 66-bed field hospital in the western Ukrainian city of Mostyska operated by 60 Israeli medical personnel.; Flight and medical treatment in Israel for the wounded, including soldiers.; 25,000 ration packs sent to the city of Kharkiv.; $200 million in loans for projects to rebuild Ukrainian civil and medical infrastructure.; A water purification system donated to Kyiv regional hospital.; 117 MarstekVenus-E backup charging stations to Kyiv oblast.
Italy	€800 million dedicated to help Ukrainians refugees in Italy.; €26 million of donations to organizations such as the Red Cross, UNICEF and UNHCR.; Medical goods, including ambulances.; 45 fire engines.; 9 tons of humanitarian aid (including in particular winter kits, tents, heaters and blankets) in December 2022.; 58 tents in cooperation with CUAMM.; €22,988,431 million towards the Ukrainian Energy Support Fund.; A €2 million project to strengthen the Ukrainian energy power with renewable energy sources.; €25 million provided to Ukrhydroenergo to rebuild Ukrainian energy infrastructure.; €1.5 million provided to humanitarian demining initiatives in Ukraine.; €32.5 million provided to restore cultural heritage damaged in Odesa.; €1.85 million of 550 to 3,000 kW industrial boilers.; €25 million to aid civilians who have lost their homes to Russsian attacks.
Japan	30 tons of humanitarian aid including firefighting gear, satellites phones and communication equipment delivered at the end of May 2022.; $1.7 million to help transport humanitarian aid (May 2022).; 60 generators and over 83,000 solar-powered lanterns in November 2022. 2 other deliveries of generators planned in December and January.; $10 million funding for UNESCO programs in Ukraine and neighbouring countries bringing education support (mental health in particular), aid for protection and restoration of cultural premises and journalism.; On 20 February 2023, Japanese government donated $5.5 billion of humanitarian aid.; $400 million grant to support reconstruction of critical infrastructure in Ukraine and also $70 million for the United Nations Development Programme (30 March 2023). In total since the beginning of the war, $650 million have been allocated towards this objective.; The total contribution of Japan towards Ukraine is over $7 billion as of 21 March 2023. The country also have supported so far more than 2,000 Ukrainian refugees (housing, work, education).; $5 million in humanitarian aid pledged on 9 June in response to the Nova Kakhovka Dam destruction.; 40 4x4 vehicles, 50 ALIS hand-held mine detectors and 150 containers of fire extinguishing liquid donated to the Ukrainian State Emergency Services.; $70 million towards the World Bank HEAL Ukraine project helping the Ukrainian state fund medical expenses, as well as $48.2 million towards the World Bank HOPE project helping the Ukrainian state fund the repair of residential buildings.; Six mobile DNA labs, 26 Volkswagen vans and forensics equipment donated to the Ukrainian police 15 May 2024.; 20 cars for medical needs donated to hospitals in Kharkiv Oblast.; Four demining vehicles donated to the State Emergency Service of Ukraine July 2024.; Two trucks donated to Kherson utility companies through the Japan International Cooperation Agency.; 97 pieces of heavy equipment to improve Ukrainian transportation, water supply and waste management services.; $30 million of hospital equipment donated to Ukraine September 2024.; 1,089,838 textbooks provided to the Ministry of Education and Science of Ukraine by the Japan International Cooperation Agency.; 11 vehicles for transporting disabled and immobile patients, 22 physiotherapy machines and other rehabilitation equipment provided to the Kyiv region by the Japan International Cooperation Agency December 2024.; Eight excavators and spare parts donated to the city of Odesa by the JICA December 2024.; Equipment and vehicles for inspecting damaged transport infrastructure donated by the JICA to the Ministry of Community and Territorial Development of Ukraine.; 8.8 billion Yen funding for reconstruction and humanitarian demining December 2025.; $3.8 million in funding for UNESCO operations in Ukraine.; $9.2 million in funding for UNICEF operations in Ukraine.; $40 million grant funding for Ukrainian public infrastructure, healthcare, agricultural sector and public broadcasting May 2026.; 62 transformers pledged May 2025.
Kazakhstan	1 March 2022: 28.2 tons of supplies including medicine; 28 March 2022: 17.5 tons including bedding and food; 13 August 2022: three ambulances purchased for and delivered to Ukraine, announced by the Ukrainian Ministry of Health.; 41 generators intended for health facilities (December 2022).; Three Ambulances, a ventilator, a defibrillator, oxygen tanks and other medical equipment donated December 2025.
Kosovo	€100,000 for humanitarian aid.
Kuwait	US$2 million in humanitarian aid to Ukraine and its neighboring countries on 16 April 2022.
Latvia	Medical equipment worth €29,996 (platelet mass storage equipment, scales for blood preparation, centrifuge, blood separation equipment, and other devices from the State Blood Donor Centre and mobile melting devices, scales for blood preparation and transportation temperature meters from its cooperation partner "ECT Nordic OÜ").; 30 buses donated by the city of Riga to Kyiv and Chernihiv.; €100,000 of humanitarian aid from the city of Riga February 2026.; 32 generators donated to educational institutions in Chernihiv Oblast.; €5.3 million towards reconstruction in Ukraine.; A 250 MVA transformer and 60 tonnes of transformer oil donated by Latvenergo.; €100,000 in support of Ukrainian medical institutions.; €617,000 to the Ukraine Energy Support Fund.€6.8 million package for energy, infrastructure and civil defence aid announced March 2026.; 20,000 litres of firefighting foam and diving equipment for extinguishing oil fires donated to The State Emergency Service of Ukraine.; 16 fire engines.; 51,840 COVID-19 vaccines and an ambulance.
Liechtenstein	SFr 500,000 worth of humanitarian aid on 25 February 2022.
Lithuania	According to the Lithuanian Minister of National Defence, as of 6 December 2022, the total aid to Ukraine amounted to €660 million, of which the military aid was €240 million.: €4 million in medical assistance sent on early March 2022.; €1 million to the Council of Europe Development Bank Ukraine Solidarity fund to be used for reconstruction efforts.; €300,000 allocated for the reconstruction of Dnipro's Taras Shevchenko Theatre by Vilnius Municipality.; Three autotransformers donated to Ukrainian energy facilities.; €1 million allocated for the reconstruction of Okhmatdyt.; €4 million donated by state owned Ignitis Grupė to purchase energy equipment for 120 megawatts of generating capacity for 420,000 Ukrainian households.; 100 metal detectors worth €300,000 donated to Ukrainian schools.; Over 124 Ukrainian police officers have undergone medical treatment, rehabilitation or Prosthesis in Lithuania.; €5.67 million to the Ukraine Energy Support Fund.; €10 million funding for the return and rehabilitation of Ukrainian children taken by the Russia.; Approximately €14 million pledged to aid projects focused on Ukrainian children and schools.; €800,000 for modernising a DNA laboratory in Poltava.; Equipment for the repair of thermal and nuclear power plants and 2,000 solar panels.; 21.9 tonnes of energy equipment donated to Kharkiv July 2026.; 28.31 tons of energy equipment donated to Kyiv and Zhytomyr August 2026.; €84,500 worth of medical equipment and medicine October 2026.
Luxembourg	€96.2 million worth of humanitarian aid provided to Ukraine between February 2022 and April 2025.€30 million donated to the Ukraine Energy Support Fund . €1 million donated to the Olena Zelenska Foundation to support mental health initiatives supporting children effected by the invasion Mat 2025.
Malaysia	On 7 February 2023, the Government of Malaysia announce the handover of medical aid worth 227,984 RM (US$52,000) to Ukraine.
Malta	The Government of Malta sent 6 containers of medicines and medical equipment worth over €1.15 million to Ukraine (March 2022).; In January 2023, Malta shipped 20 generators and medical equipment to Ukraine.; 25 Mine detectors as part of the European Union Civil Protection Mechanism (December 2023).; Medical supplies donated through MOAS including medication and infusion solutions 2025.; €100,000 funding for the Council of Europe Action Plan for Ukraine.; €50,000 to the Ukraine Energy Support fund.
Moldova	On 2 April 2022, the Government of Moldova has sent its first humanitarian aid package worth 24 million Lei (€1.2 million) to Ukraine.; 27 February 2024 Moldova donated 75 tons of humanitarian aid worth Lei 10 million to Ukraine consisting of medical supplies, tinned food and generators.; €700,000 aid package containing generators, transformers, conductors, cabling and medical supplies February 2026.
Monaco	The Red Cross has donated €950,000.
Mongolia	$200,000 of humanitarian aid on 4 April 2022.
Montenegro	Humanitarian aid: Montenegro's finance ministry sent €50,000 to the government in Kyiv and Red Cross Montenegro launched a special hotline for donations to fund humanitarian aid for Ukraine.; Aid to refugees: From March 2022, Ukrainians fleeing the war receive a year-long protection to stay in Montenegro.
Netherlands	Around €60 million, including a contribution to the UN's Ukraine Humanitarian Fund, €27.5 million via the European Bank for Reconstruction and Development.; €90 million via the World Bank's Ukraine Relief, Recovery, Reconstruction and Reform Trust Fund.; €72 million via the European Bank for Reconstruction and Development.; €18 million for the delivery of parts for the electricity grid.; €50 million for infrastructure repairs.; €1 million via the Association of Netherlands Municipalities for reconstruction plans for Kherson, Odesa, Mykolaiv.; €150 million from official development assistance budget for the reception of refugees in the Netherlands.; €500,000 for repairs to damaged cultural heritage.; €1 million for the International Criminal Court (March 2023).; A humanitarian package amounting to €180 million was announced in April 2023 which includes support for agriculture in Ukraine and repair work.; A humanitarian aid package worth €118,875,00 for Ukraine was announced on 4 July 2023.; €209.5 million support package for restoring critical infrastructure announced 23 September 2024.; €500,000 to the OPCW for activities relating to Ukraine.; €20 million to repair and maintain Ukraine's energy network January 2025.; €100 million to the Ukraine Energy Support Fund.; €30 million allocated for Ukrainian reconstruction through The Ukraine Partnership Facility program July 2025.; €25 million allocated for repairing the Ukrainian energy grid and for emergency gas purchases October 2025.€23 million in LNG purchases, powerplant repair and energy equipment January 2026.; €178 million pledged to help develop distributed generation and prepere Ukraine for the heating season June 2026.; A Deployable Exploitation and Analysis Laboratory donated by the Ministry of Defence to Ukraine to investigate Russian war crimes.
New Zealand	Initial pledge of NZ$2 million to support health facilities on the ground and providing basic needs – such as food and hygiene items – on 28 February.; NZ$1.5 million for legal support to the Office of the High Commissioner for Human Rights, the International Court of Justice and International Criminal Court on 11 April 2022.; Additional NZ$1 million donated to the International Criminal Court.; On 14 December 2022, the New Zealand government announced a further NZ$3 million in humanitarian aid through the International Committee of the Red Cross.; On 3 May 2023, the New Zealand government announced NZ$2 million in aid to the Ukraine Humanitarian Fund, NZ$1.5 million to the United Nations High Commissioner for Refugees, NZ$1.3 million of funding to the International Criminal Court and NZ$500,000 towards a New Zealand Disaster Response Partnership to support Ukrainian refugees.; On 13 July 2023, the New Zealand government announced NZ$3 million in aid to reconstruction assistance for Ukraine, NZ$1.2 million to the United Nations Development Programme's Mine Action Programme and NZ$500,000 to the International Atomic Energy Agency for its work in Ukraine.; On 22 February 2024, The New Zealand government announced NZ$7 million in humanitarian assistance to Ukraine and NZ$3 million to the World Bank's Ukraine Relief, Recovery, Reconstruction and Reform Trust Fund.; NZ$10 million in humanitarian assistance announced 10 July 2024.; Additional NZ$3 million to the World Bank's Ukraine Relief, Recovery, Reconstruction and Reform Trust Fund and NZ$5 million in humanitarian aid to Ukrainian civilians announced February 2025.; NZ$7 million in humanitarian aid to frontline communities in Ukraine and NZ$1 million for Ukrainians in neighbouring countries.
North Macedonia	The Red Cross received at least DEN2.5 million (US$42,500) worth of donations.; The Finance Ministry allocated DEN120 million to support Ukrainian refugees in North Macedonia
Norway	Prime Minister Jonas Gahr Støre approved humanitarian aid for Ukraine: NKr 2 billion (€200 million) of humanitarian aid, on 27 February 2022.; Norwegian dairy product cooperative Tine is sending 40,000 litres of milk to Ukraine at the request of the Ukrainian embassy in Oslo.; NKr400 million to support United Nations humanitarian aid, including for Ukraine in the beginning of 2023.; The Norwegian parliament approved the plan for a support program for Ukraine over five years totalling NKr75 billion (15 billion a year).; NKr 2 billion for welfare services.; NKr 1 billion in humanitarian aid pledged on 26 September 2023.; NKr 1 billion in humanitarian aid pledged on 13 November 2023.; NKr 1.1 billion to help Ukraine to rebuild critical infrastructure pledged on 16 June 2024.; $7.4 million to support UNICEF programs in Ukraine.; €2 million in grants to support energy sustainability for Ukrainian small businesses in cooperation with Germany.; NKr 164 million allocated for the training of mine clearing dogs and their handlers of the State Emergency Services of Ukraine in 2025.; NKr 530 million to the UNCHR to support the internally displaced in Ukraine and NKr 50 million to support Ukrainian refugees in Moldova.; NKr 25 million allocated for cyber security of critical civilian infrastructure for 2025.; €209,188,537 Contribution to the Ukraine Energy Support Fund.; €90 contribution to the EU Ukraine Facility September 2026.; $200 million funding through the World Bank's PEACE Ukraine project for old age social payments.; €40 million in funding for decentralised, renewable and battery stored energy for energy resilience pledged May 2026.; NKr 100 million funding allocated for the repair of the Chernobyl protective sarcophagus.; NKR 132 million further funding for UNICEF in Ukraine, 15 million of which allocated to rehabilitation of children returned from Russian kidnapping.; NKr 100 million further funding for ICRC activity in Ukraine September 2026, 10 million of which allocated for the Central Tracing Agency Bureau.
Pakistan	15 tons of humanitarian assistance which include emergency medicines, electro-medical equipment, winter bedding and food items, delivered on 15 March 2022.; Another 15 tons of humanitarian aid delivered via PAF C-130 aircraft. 7.5 tons dispatched 31 May with a second delivery of 7.5 tons to be dispatched on 3 June.
Philippines	$100,000 to the UN Office for the Coordination of Humanitarian Affairs; 40 generators pledged May 2026.
Poland	As of 23 September 2022, more than 6,500,000 refugees had crossed the border into Poland. See Ukrainian refugee crisis. Refugees were covered by the social assistance program, including financial assistance, by the health care system, and school-age children by the education system. As of 30 June 2023, the number of Ukrainian refugees who are beneficiaries of temporary protection in Poland has decreased to 977,400, or 24% of all Ukrainian refugees in Europe.; Ukrainian refugees had the right to move free of charge in Poland through the public transport system from 26 February until the end of May 2022.; Wounded Ukrainian soldiers and children evacuated by sanitary trains are in many situations hospitalized in Poland.; More than 1,500 tons of food delivered to Kharkiv and Zaporizhia organized by the Chancellery of the Prime Minister and RARS.; As of 28 September 2022, Polish Institute of Economy estimates that 70% of Poles have donated for Ukraine and Ukrainians more than 10 billion PLN (about 0.38% GDP) worth of aid.; As of 26 February 2026, Poland has purchased over 20,500 Starlink terminals for Ukraine.; In conjunction with the United Kingdom, Poland support the building of two villages in Western and central Ukraine for internally displaced civilians (March 2023).; 7 June 2023 Poland pledged 10 water tankers with a capacity of 18,000 litres each and 10 high-capacity pump to aid those effected by the Destruction of the Kakhovka Dam. €25 million donated to the European Investment Bank EU for Ukraine Fund for the reconstruction of Ukraine October 2024.; €3,127,751 Contribution to the Ukraine Energy Support Fund.; 400 generators provided to Kyiv Oblast January 2026.; €1.95 million of generators pledged November 2026.
Portugal	€100,000 (US$109,000) of medical supplies had been sent by 3 March 2022: 204,000 medicinal units including antibiotics, 416,000 syringes and needles and additional medicinal products.; 603 Portuguese hospital beds were made available for infirmary (495), and intensive care (108) for patients transferred from Ukraine.; €2.1 million (US$2.216 million) additional humanitarian aid directly from the Portuguese Government to finance United Nations response programs in Ukraine (€1 million) and direct assistance (€1.1 million) were announced on 5 May 2022, during the High-Level International Donors' Conference for Ukraine.; Portuguese firefighters donated and delivered 11 ambulances to Ukraine, arriving at the Ukrainian border on 14 March 2022.; National campaigns began donating clothing, blankets, canned, and packaged food deliveries to Ukraine and refugee transport to Portugal immediately after Russia started its aggression upon Ukraine on 24 February 2022. Campaigns are organised by numerous Portuguese civil society organisations, Roman Catholic Church parishes, the Portuguese Red Cross, NGOs, and the private sector.; In December 2022, the government approved aid to Ukrainian refugees in Poland worth €30 million.; €1.2 million to the Ukraine Energy Support Fund.; €1 million worth of energy equipment purchased through the United Nations.
Qatar	$5 million in humanitarian aid to support Ukrainian refugees and internally displaced people on 9 April 2022.; $100 million in humanitarian aid to support Ukraine's health, education and demining efforts on 28 July 2023.; $3 million to the Office of The Ukrainian Parliament commissioner for Human rights.; $10 million contribution to the Food and Agriculture Organization to support rural communities and farmers in Ukraine affected by landmines and unexploded ordinance.
Romania	As of 8 April, the Romanian government had reported 678,081 Ukrainians entering Romania. Romanian Defence Minister Vasile Dîncu announced on 22 February 2022 that Romania could receive 500,000 refugees if necessary; the first refugees arrived two days later. On 15 March, Minister of Foreign Affairs Bogdan Aurescu reported that about 80,000 remained in the country.; Romania is also offering to treat the wounded in its 11 military hospitals.; On 18 April, Romania donated 11 ambulances to the Ukrainian emergency services.; On 22 March 2023, the Romanian government send RON562 million (€112 million) of food supplies to Ukraine.
San Marino	Three pallets of medical aid on 15 March 2022, along with three medical trucks to be used in the Medical Forces Command.
Saudi Arabia	US$10 million of humanitarian aid to provide medical aid and shelter to Ukrainian refugees in April 2022.; US$400 million of humanitarian aid in October.; US$100 in humanitarian aid and $300 million in Petroleum products pledged on 26 February 2023.; 168 tons of humanitarian aid donated in February 2023: Shelter materials; Electric generators; Medical supplies.; $10 million funding to the World Food Programme for Ukraine.; The King Salman Humanitarian Aid and Relief Centre announced the delivery of 25 ambulances to the Ukrainian Ministry of Health September 2024.; $5 million funding for UNDOPS project to provide medical equipment to four Ukrainian hospitals by KSrelief.
Serbia	The Serbian Government donated €3 million in aid to children and displaced persons from Ukraine. On 30 August 2023 the Serbian government delivered 14 trucks filled with humanitarian aid such as medicines, drinking water, water filters and blankets for the residents of Kherson. 5,000 laptops and tablet computers donated to the Olena Zelenska Foundation for Ukrainian schoolchildren. €2 million donated for the purchase of transformers through the UNDP.
Singapore	Singapore sent four tranches of aid through the Singapore Red Cross, totalling US$7.4 million worth of humanitarian assistance.; On 10 June, the Singapore Ministry of Foreign affairs announced it would be sending nine ambulances, two fire engines, firefighting gear, mine detectors and medical supplies to Ukraine.; 22 ambulances donated to Ukraine on 7 September 2023.
Slovakia	€1.7 million worth of medical supply.; 300 generators given to Ukraine [December 2022].; 11 tons of humanitarian aid worth €203,492 containing generators, heaters, clothing, food, water and first aid kits [January 2024].; €500,000 to Ukraine to purchase energy infrastructure equipment from Slovak companies.
Slovenia	* The Slovenian Government sent €100,000 to the ICRC, earmarked for the Ukrainian refugees.: Slovenia sent to Ukraine 200 sleeping bags, 200 pairs of rubber boots, 10 diesel generators, 250,000 latex gloves, 250,000 nitryl gloves and 600,000 facemasks.; Three ambulances, two sent on 30 December 2022 and a third sent 14 March 2024.; €330,000 worth of equipment to help restore the energy infrastructure of Ukraine.; €600,000 humanitarian aid to the Olena Zelenska Foundation for the reconstruction of the central hospital in Izyum pledged November 2023.; €1.5 million for the purchase of demining equipment for the State Emergency Service of Ukraine.; €5 million in humanitarian funded allocated for Ukraine June 2024.; Two Ford semi trucks donated to the State Emergency Services of Ukraine to assist in demining.; Three Kozak PM-L pyrotechnic vehicles for the State Emergency Services of Ukraine for demining paid for by the Slovenian government.; €500,000 for the Ukraine Energy Support Fund.
South Korea	US$10 million worth of humanitarian assistance announced on 28 February 2022, amounting to 40 tons of medical supplies which prioritizes Ukraine's specific requests including first aid kits, portable oxygen generators, blankets, respirators, etc.; On 28 February, offered temporary work and residency permits to 3,843 Ukrainian expats living in Korea. The permit is of indeterminate length and lasts until the situation in Ukraine "stabilizes". The offer includes amnesty for Ukrainians whose period of stay has already expired.; Announced plans to open a new KOICA office in Ukraine.; Market release of some of the petroleum which Korea holds as part of its strategic reserve, as well as re-selling LNG to Europe as part of "international efforts to help Ukraine."; US$3 million worth of aid donated to the World Food Programme projects in Ukraine and Moldova.; 100 tons of medical supplies, vaccines for children and power generators shipped to Ukraine in December 2022. The total humanitarian aid from South Korea to Ukraine reaches US$100 million at the end of 2022.; $130 million of humanitarian aid (February 2023); 10 DOK-ING MV-4 unmanned demining vehicles and five pickup trucks donated to the State Emergency Services.; 200 KIA Bongo ambulance cars delivered to Ukraine by April 2025.; $5 million to the World Food Programme to support Ukrainian refugees in Moldova.; Two ambulances donated to the Ukrainian Ministry of Health December 2024.; $20 million grant through the UNPD to help rebuild the Kherson, Sumy and Zaporizhzhia regions.
Spain	20 tons of humanitarian aid worth more than €150,000 on 27 February 2022.; 54 pallets (83 cubic metres) of medicines and medical supplies; Two ambulances and 5 tons of medical supplies dispatched by the Spanish Army for Ukraine on 7 October 2022.; As of 25 October 2022, humanitarian assistance amounts to €92 million of goods and €200 of financial donations.; 30 more ambulances and multiple generators for medical facilities in Ukraine (November 2022).; 107 current transformers, 28 voltage transformers, 26 lightning rods and 2 disconnectors provided to Ukrenergo by The Ministry of Foreign Affairs, European Union and Cooperation and Red Eléctrica de España.; Six generators totalling 6.3mW of power February 2026.; €110 million in humanitarian aid provided in by January 2025.; €400 million in reconstruction aid provided in total by January 2025.; A team of medical trainers sent to train hospital staff at Lviv Hospital.; €4,506,000 Contribution to the Ukraine Energy Support Fund.
Sweden	27 February 2022: SKr 100 million towards humanitarian aid in Ukraine distributed as follows: SKr 50 million for the UN Refugee Agency.; SKr 30 million for the UN Humanitarian Land Fund.; SKr 20 million for the International Committee of the Red Cross.; 22 April, the Swedish government announced that equipment used to repair the electrical grid would be donated to Ukraine.; 2 June, SKr 100 million for civilian efforts through the Swedish Civil Contingencies Agency.; 29 August 2022 the Swedish government announced it would also provide SKr 500 million for the reconstruction of Ukraine.; 13 September 2022 the Swedish government announced it would donate 500,000 COVID-19 vaccines developed by Pfizer and BioNTech; 26 June 2023 the Swedish government announced a SEK 380 million humanitarian aid package for Ukraine.; 1,108 tons of equipment, including generators, transformers, substations and other equipment for carrying out repairs at energy facilities donated as of January 2024.; SKr 40 million in humanitarian aid through the World Food Programme.; 13 diesel-powered backup power generators from Svenska kraftnät.; SEK 500 million in support for heating and electricity supply in Ukraine; SEK 110 million in humanitarian aid announced October 2024.; Two former Swedish Coast Guard vessels donated to the Ministry of Internal Affairs (Ukraine).; 40,000 protective respirator masks donated to the State Emergency Service of Ukraine.; €383,615,507 Contribution to the Ukraine Energy Support Fund.; Two Swedish manufactured gas turbines pledged to Ukraine.; SEK 1.4 billion package for humanitarian and reconstruction aid announced March 2025.; SEK 20 million funding for International Atomic Energy Agency activity in Ukraine.; SEK 1.112 billion aid package for energy grid and infrastructure repairs and healthcare announced December 2025.; SEK 6.9 million support for Ukrainian healthcare through the Swecare Foundation.; 10 high speed boats transferred from the Coast Guard to Ukrainian State Emergency services.; SKr 500 million healthcare and reconstruction package.
Switzerland	35 t (34 long tons; 39 short tons) of aid and medical supplies delivered to Kyiv by the Swiss Humanitarian Aid Unit on 6 March 2022.; SFr 100 million (~US$106.2 million) was the approximate total of humanitarian aid that was sent up till August 2022 by the Swiss government to Ukraine and in neighbouring countries that host Ukrainian refugees.; 100 t (98 long tons; 110 short tons) of mostly medical and sanitary equipment was shipped in August.; A total of 3,500 t (3,400 long tons; 3,900 short tons) relief supplies was sent in the period of March–August 2022 to Ukraine and neighbouring countries.; On 2 November, the Swiss government decided to send an additional SFr 100 million (~US$106.2 million) for Ukraine to prepare for the winter 22/23 under the name of Aktionsplan Winterhilfe. A portion of the money will be to secure energy for Ukraine.; Up to 22 February 2023, the Swiss government has donated a total of SFr 1.3 billion (~US$1.378 billion) to help Ukrainians (1.03 billion for refugees in Switzerland and 270 million in Ukraine).; 156 hospital beds donated by Geneva University Hospitals.; SFr 900,000 aid package delivered 13 March 2024 containing fire engine spare parts, demining equipment and medical supplies.; $2.6 million donated to Save the Children by the Swiss Solidarity foundation to restore children's access in-person learning in eastern Ukraine.; Three GSC-200 unmanned demining vehicles pledged to Ukraine by the end of 2024.; 30 rubble-clearing machines and 30 water pumps for firefighting announced October 2024.; Four pumps donated to Odesa to assist in the cities heat supply November 2024.; Almost SFr 45 million to restore Ukrainian energy infrastructure, renovate damaged homes and meet urgent humanitarian needs December 2024.; €18,969,639 contribution to The Ukraine Energy Support Fund.; SFr 32 million of energy aid containing 18 LNG powered electricity modules and up to 80 diesel generators pledged February 2026.; SF 600,000 to restore the Kyiv Pechersk Lavra through UNECO.
Taiwan	Medical supplies: 27 metric tons of medical supplies [February 2022].; 650 metric tons of supplies [March 2022].; Funds: $3 million for Kyiv municipality [April 2022] (Funds collected from private citizens).; $5 million for six medical institutions in Ukraine [April 2022] (Funds collected from private citizens).; $25 million for Ukrainian refugees [April 2022] (Funds collected from private citizens).; On 26 October, Taiwan pledged $56 million donation to support Ukraine to rebuild schools, hospitals and other infrastructure.; On 1 June 2023 the Taiwanese government donated $5 million to Lithuania's Central Project Management Agency to help rebuild Ukrainian schools; Additional $5 million to Lithuania's Central Project Management Agency to fund EOD training, education reconstruction and reintegration of wounded soldiers in Ukraine October 2024.; $3.8 million of humanitarian aid pledged to the city of Bucha [November 2023]; $1 million to help Ukrainian refugees in Poland.; €4 million to an EBRD initiative to support Ukraine's private insurance market.; $560,000 pledged to help rebuild roads connecting the Kyiv Regional Centre for Mental Health to surrounding areas.
Thailand	Humanitarian aid: 2,000,000 bath (60,000 US dollars) towards humanitarian aid in Ukraine; Funds: Thais and foreigners have donated 5,306,750.00 THB (US$157,913.54) through the Embassy of Ukraine in Thailand, which will be collected and delivered to humanitarian aid in Ukraine, This money will be transferred to a special account of the National Bank of Ukraine; Supplies: On 6 April 2023, The Thai government has provided 17 units of 20 Kv generators via Polish Red Cross for humanitarian aid to the people of Ukraine.; Thai humanitarian assistance to Ukraine various channels including UNICEF, the Thai Red Cross Society, and the Polish Red Cross Society with a total value of 26 million THB (approximately US$910,000).
Turkey	Unspecified number of blankets, tents, sleeping bags, cleaning and hygiene materials as well as five specialists, one mobile kitchen for refugees at the Romania-Ukraine border and one disaster response vehicle.; As of 13 April 2022, 67 truckloads of humanitarian aid have been sent to Ukraine, including 46 through NGOs.
Turkmenistan	On 26 April 2022, Ministry of Foreign Affairs of Turkmenistan announced that Turkmenistan will deliver an unspecified amount of humanitarian aid to Ukraine, which includes medicines and clothing. This was confirmed the same day by Turkmenistan news agency Hronikatm.Com and Uzbekistan news agency Kun.Uz.; A cargo of humanitarian aid was sent to Ukraine in March 2023, with medical supplies, food and clothes.
United Arab Emirates	50 tonnes of humanitarian aid including medical on 14 April 2022.: 100 million dollars of humanitarian aid (October 2022).; 14 tons of humanitarian aid, which includes blankets, led bulbs, and personal care supplies (March 2023).; 550 tons of relief supplies, which include, 2520 generators and 6 ambulances.; 4 million dollars of humanitarian aid (March 2023).; 50 ambulances equipped with oxygen tanks, heart monitors, defibrillators, electrocardiographs and lung ventilators pledged to Ukraine.; $4.5 million funding for orphan care through the Olena Zelenska Foundation.; 7,500 laptops and 10,000 schoolbags donated to the Ukrainian education sector.
United Kingdom	£100 million of humanitarian aid announced on 23 February 2022.; £40 million additional humanitarian aid announced on 27 February 2022.; Additional £80 million in aid to help Ukraine deal with humanitarian crisis on 1 March 2022.; £4 million in humanitarian aid to Ukraine on 28 February 2022.; In co-operation with Australia to United Kingdom will send hygiene kits, solar lights, kitchen sets and blankets along with other basic necessities. To displaced Ukrainians.; UK announced the donation of a "fleet of ambulances" to Ukraine, on 6 April 2022.; UK announced the amount it had donated through multilateral donor conferences for humanitarian aid totalled £394m so far on 9 April.; On 6 May, the British government pledged £45 million to UN and humanitarian groups in and around Ukraine and additional medical supplies.; As of 20 May, the British government has donated 11.07 million items of medicine and medical equipment to Ukraine.; 4 July – The UK pledged to donate £10m for repairs to the Ukraine energy grid and for reconnecting homes and to guarantee £41m of European Bank for Reconstruction and Development (EBRD) loans to Ukrenergo, the Ukrainian national grid operator. The UK also committed an undisclosed sum to immediate life-saving assistance and demining operations through the £37m raised by the Partnership Fund for a Resilient Ukraine multi-donor fund. The Partnership Fund for a Resilient Ukraine was launched by the UK in December 2021 with the aim to raise £35m from donors over the next three years for support in the conflict ravaged areas of Ukraine, it is supported by Canada, Sweden, Switzerland, and the United States.; On 15 July, the British government provided a £2.5 million package for the training of judges and forensic experts and for sending teams to the scenes of alleged Russian war crimes to aid Ukrainian prosecutors.; On 19 August, the UK pledged £15m of funding to support the basic needs of 200,000 refugees in Ukraine and Poland.; On 28 September, £300,000 donated to the HALO Trust by the Scottish government.; In conjunction with Poland, the United Kingdom support (£10m funding) the building of two villages in Western and central Ukraine for internally displaced civilians (March 2023).; On 10 June 2023 the British government announced £16 million in humanitarian aid to Ukraine, £10 to the Red Cross movement, £5 million to the United Nations OCHA and £1 to the UN IOM; 15 June the Welsh Government announced the donation of an airport fire truck to Kharkiv airport.; 7 July 2023 15 Rapid intervention vehicles and two major foam firefighting vehicles were pledged by the Royal Air Force and the Welsh Government.; 10 September 2023 the UK Hydrographic Office donated £1.6 million worth of equipment to the State Hydrographic Service of Ukraine.; Training in protecting critical energy infrastructure provided by army Royal Engineer.; £8.5 million to the Red Cross Movement and the Ukraine Humanitarian Fund.; Over 100 tonnes of medical supplies and equipment donated by South Central Ambulance Service since the February 2022.; £2 million worth of medical equipment including ventilators, oxygen concentrators, suction pumps, patient monitors, volumetric pumps and heated humidifiers donated 5 April 2024.; €202,090,738 contribution to the Ukraine Energy Support Fund.; £800,000 worth of surplus medical equipment donated by the Scottish Government October 2024.; £35 million in support for repairing the Ukrainian energy grid and supporting vulnerable civilians announced December 2024.; £4.5 million in funding for the investigation and prosecution of Russian war criminals in Ukraine.; £100 million in humanitarian funding announced 16 January 2025, partly towards UNOCHA and the Ukrainian Red Cross Society.; £7 million provided to the HALO Trust by the British government to continue demining work in Ukraine and Afghanistan.; £10 million funding for Humanitarian Action through Volunteers, Enablers and Networks (HAVEN) in Ukraine.; £5 million funding for Mercy Corps to provide humanitarian aid to Ukrainian civilians.; £9.4 million funding to the Ukrainian Red Cross.; Over 100 tonnes of medical supplies and equipment donated to Ukrainian hospitals by South Central Ambulance Service.; 30 boxes of surplus medical supplies, boots and uniforms donated to Chernihiv Oblast by the South East Coast Ambulance Service.; €6.7 million pledged to the EBRD Chornobyl Fund to help repair the New safe confinement.; £400,000 support OPCW activities in Ukraine.; £10.5 million in funding for the Governance Reform Programme and £1 million funding green energy transitioning.; £100 million for humanitarian aid and repair of power and heating infrastructure in frontline regions of Ukraine and £42 million for repairing and protecting energy infrastructure announced September 2025.; £10 million humanitarian aid announced December 2025.; £20 million of energy infrastructure support January 2026.; €140,000 funding for the Council of Europe Action Plan for Ukraine.; £25.7 million for energy support and humanitarian assistance to frontline communities February 2026.; £5 million funding for legal training for the investigation and prosecution of Russian war crimes.; £1.2 million funding to organisations locating Ukrainian children abducted by the Russian military.; £64 million funding for Ukrainian winter resilience and £6.3 million for investigating Russian war crimes announced October 2026.; £17 million funding for repairs for the Chornobyl plant confinements.; 12 specialist theatre trolleys donated to frontline hospitals by Queen Elizabeth Hospital King's Lynn.; 280 tonnes of fishing nets provided to The Ukrainian Minister for the Development of Communities to protect public roads from Russian drones.; Bailiwick of Jersey: £1,360,000 in humanitarian aid updated 8 April 2022. 51 baby incubators funded by Jersey Overseas Aid and Crown Agents. Deliveries started on 31 May 2022. An additional £400,000 in humanitarian aid donated to Ukraine on 17 February 2023. Donations from Jersey have paid for more than 100 EOD training courses for the Friends of Ukraine EOD. Bailiwick of Guernsey: £500,000 in humanitarian aid announced on 2 March 2022. Donation of firefighting gear on 8 March 2022. Donation of around 29,000 knitted blankets and baby clothing donated 24 February 2024. Isle of Man: £500,000 of humanitarian aid on 21 March 2022.
United States	Obama: $23 million of humanitarian aid on 21 November 2014.; Biden: $1 billion in food, medicine, water and other supplies on 24 March 2022.; On 23 May, the Bureau of International Narcotics and Law Enforcement Affairs provided 21 armoured SUVs to the State Border Guard Service of Ukraine and Ukrainian police. Additional vehicles donated on 2 June: 25 Mitsubishi L200 pickup trucks; 35 Renault Duster SUVs; 16 4x4 personnel carriers; 13 cargo trucks; 24 May $4 million provided to the HALO Trust for ordinance disposal in Ukraine.; On 15 June, the United States government announced it would provide an additional $225 million in humanitarian aid to Ukraine.; Over 300 care packages for Ukrainian refugees prepared by the California National Guard; On 9 July, The United States government announced it would provide an additional $368 million in humanitarian aid to Ukraine.; On 26 September 2022, US Secretary of State Antony Blinken announced $457.5 million worth of civilian security assistance will be provided to Ukraine.; US announces Ukraine aid, Russia sanctions on War Anniversary; On 23 February 2023, the US State Department awarded the charity Mines Advisory Group $8 million for operations in Ukraine.; On 16 June 2023 the US State Department announced it would be providing $205 million worth of humanitarian aid to Ukraine.; 9 Skydio 2+ drones donated by USAID to help document Russian war crimes in Ukraine.; $1 million to the International Centre for the Prosecution of the Crime of Aggression Against Ukraine At The Hague.; 22 mobile boiler houses donated to Ukrainian communities.; 16 grain trailers donated to Ukrainian farmers.; Six armoured four by four vehicles donated by the US Dept. of State to the Office of the Prosecutor General to aid in investigating Russian war crimes.; 109 generators, 19 heat and power cogenerations stations and 13 emergency vehicles provided by USAD April 2024.; Seven power transformers provided by USAID on 16 April 2024.; 102 diesel generators to UkrGasVydobuvannya to aid in energy infrastructure repair purchased by USAID.; Over $1.5 billion in humanitarian aid announced 15 June 2024. $824 million in energy assistance, $379 million in humanitarian assistance and $300 million in civilian security assistance; Funding for the printing of over 3 million textbooks for Ukrainian schoolchildren through USAID.; Five vans, over 11 km of pipes, three control systems for gas supply and other specialized equipment to Kherson Oblast to restore gas infrastructure through USAID.; $700 million additional humanitarian aid announced 11 September 2024, $325 million in energy assistance, nearly $290 million humanitarian assistance and over $102 million in humanitarian demining assistance.; $237 million in humanitarian aid funding announced for Ukraine and Ukrainian refugees by USAID and the U.S. Department of State 2 October 2024.; $1.35 billion grant provided to Ukraine through USAID to sustain core government functions and humanitarian expenditures 13 November 2024.; 63 generators as well as transformers, pumps and other equipment to water suppliers throughout Ukraine November 2024.; Three generators provided to Ukrainian border crossing points with Romania and Moldova by USAID December 2024.; 10 autonomous welding machines provided by USAID December 2024.; $465 million in humanitarian aid to Ukraine through USAID December 2024 with another $20 million from The World Bank.; €71,246,826 contribution to the Ukraine Energy Support Fund.; 74 charging stations for communities in Zaporizhzhia Oblast provided by USAID January 2025.; 250 power transformers worth €1.2 million to Kharkiv Oblast.
Uzbekistan	On 17 March 2022, Uzbekistan sent 28 tons of humanitarian aid to Ukraine, and this included medical supplies, bandages and anti-viral pills, which was confirmed by Gazeta.uz and VOA Uzbek-language service (Amerika Ovozi) on the same day. On 8 April 2022, Uzbekistan sent 34 additional tons of humanitarian aid to Ukraine, including medical aid kits, food supplies and anti-viral pills, which was confirmed on 11 April 2022 by BBC news O'zbek and VOA Uzbek and it was also confirmed by the Uzbek news agencies Kun.Uz and Gazeta.Uz. On 6 June 2022, Uzbekistan sent 19 additional tons of humanitarian aid to Ukraine, which included antiviral pills and other medical supplies. This was confirmed the same day by Uzbek news agency Kun.Uz.
Vatican City	As of March 2022, the Vatican has sent two cardinals to Ukraine to provide "material and spiritual support" to the Ukrainian people. Pope Francis has also donated medical supplies to Ukrainian refugees through the Office of Papal Charities. 264 trucks worth of humanitarian aid. 7 ambulances. A converted small mobile medical unit and six ultrasound machines donated to Ukraine December 2024. Food aid provided to Kharkiv Oblast July 2025. 80 generators as well as food and medicines delivered February 2026.
Vietnam	$1,000,000 worth of humanitarian assistance provided to Ukraine by Vietnam.

=== European Union ===
Individual EU member states have provided aid since 2014. The following list is the aid collectively provided by the EU. Most of this aid has been coordinated by the European Commission.

- €500 million in humanitarian aid, announced on 1 March 2022.
- In March 2022, a total of 10,000 free beds from hospitals in the EU were "reserved" for Ukrainians and the first war casualties from Ukraine were transported to various hospitals in the union.
- At least 5000 Ukrainian civilians evacuated for medical treatment in hospitals across the EU.
- At least 5 million Ukrainian refugee civilians housed in the EU through a Temporary Protection Directive.
- 5.5 million Potassium Iodide tablets provided to Ukraine though the EU Emergency Response Coordination Centre.
- 500 electrical generators provided to Ukraine via the EU Civil Protection Mechanism on 27 June 2023.
- An additional €110 million worth of humanitarian aid pledged to Ukraine and Ukrainians displaced in Moldova as well as 84 generators on 14 November 2023.
- Over 3,000 Ukrainian patients transferred to hospitals in EU nations for specialist care.
- €83 million funding towards humanitarian projects helping Ukrainian civilians in Ukraine and Moldova.
- 157 generators donated by Austria, Germany, Sweden and the Netherlands via the EU Civil Protection Mechanism along with 10 large 1MW generators from rescEU stockpiles.
- €5 million investment grant from the Eastern Europe Energy Efficiency and Environment Partnership for Ukrainian hospitals.
- IT equipment to war crime prosecutors in Donetsk, Luhansk, Kharkiv and the Prosecutor General of Ukraine.
- €180,900 of forensics equipment to the State Border Guard Service of Ukraine.
- 5,876 solar panels provided by the European Commission to Ukrainian hospitals.
- €100 million grant to Ukrenergo from European Commission to support the reconstruction and restoration of Ukraine's energy grid announced 18 June 2024.
- Approximately €2 million of IT equipment to Ukraine's Ministry of Agrarian Policy and Food and the State Service on Food Safety and Consumer Protection.
- 68 generators provided to sustain critical infrastructure in Ukraine July 2024.
- €2 million in funding allocated for a Mines Advisory Group and APOPO demining initiative in Ukraine.
- €35 million towards humanitarian projects in Ukraine and €5 million to projects for Ukrainian refugees in Moldova announced 6 September 2024.
- Five Peugeot Traveller vans donated to the State Emergency Service of Ukraine October 2024 by the EU and UNDP.
- €26.4 million allocated for the UNHRC's winter aid programme for Ukraine announced December 2024.
- €15 million towards small NGOs in Ukraine and €10 million to support civil society work on EU integration.
- Two specialised vehicles for mobile social services units on Chernivtsi Oblast provided by the EU and UNDP.
- €1.7 million additional funding for the International Chernobyl Cooperation Account
- €52 million allocated for four Ukrainian transport infrastructure projects announced December 2024.
- €16.5 million in funding to renew urban public transport in Kyiv, Mykolaiv, Ivano-Frankivsk, and Odesa by the European Investment bank December 2024.
- €140 aid package allocated for humanitarian projects in Ukraine announced January 2025 as well as €8 million allocated for Ukrainian refugees and host communities Moldova.
- 600 laptops donated to teachers in Ukraine's Donbass by the European Bank for Reconstruction and Development.
- €398,000 worth of equipment provided to State Emergency Service of Ukraine in cooperation with the UNDP.
- Five transport and palliative care vehicles to Ukrainian communities in cooperation with the UNDP.
- €300,000 worth of equipment provided to State Customs Service of Ukraine.
- €116.6 million funding for independent Ukrainian media since 2017.
- 16 ambulances valued at €850,000 donated to Chernihiv, Sumy, Kharkiv, Mykolaiv, Dnipropetrovsk, Zaporizhzhia, Kherson, and Donetsk oblasts March 2025 in cooperation with the UNDP.
- Two cogeneration units provided to Zaporizhzhia Oblast to improve the reliable supply of heat and power to homes and infrastructure by the EU and UNDP.
- €19.6 billion in grants and loans provided to Ukraine by the EU Ukraine facility to improve economic stability, reform and reconstruction by April 2025.
- Four specialised medical vehicles provided to Chernihiv Oblast by the EU and UNDP April 2025.
- €166.2 million in funding to support UNHCR's humanitarian response in Ukraine between 2022 and 2025.
- €32.2 million finding for the UNHCR aid for Ukrainian refugees in Moldova.
- €48.8 million additional funding for UNHCR activities in Ukraine between July 2025 and December 2026.
- A motorboat, trailer and diving equipment with a total value of €140,000 donated to the State Emergency Services through the UNDP.
- €30 million allocated for reconstructing the reconstruction of the water supply system in Kryvyi Rih.
- €13 million funding for The Energy Efficiency Fund for Ukraine June 2025.
- €279 million to the Ukraine Energy Support fund.
- €25 million funding for the EBRD Chornobyl Fund to help repair the New safe confinement.
- €40 million funding allocated for humanitarian assistance for Ukrainian civilians through winter announced September 2025.
- €152 million funding for UNWFP activities in Ukraine since March 2022.
- €46.2 funding to maintain and restore local infrastructure by the EIB October 2025.
- €153 million in humanitarian aid to Ukrainian civilians in Ukraine and Moldova allocated January 2026.
- The contents of a thermal powerplants delivered piecemeal to Ukraine with support from Poland and Lithuania 2025.
- €22.07 million grant funding for containerised cogeneration units for Kyiv Oblast March 2026.
- €30 million grant funding for repairing heating supply in frontline regions September 2026.
- €25 million from the Council of Europe Development Bank to aid civilians who have lost their homes to Russsian attacks.
- 500 generators and 200 busses from EU reserves November 2026.

=== Companies ===
More than 100 companies have taken actions in support of Ukraine, including boycotts, in February and March 2022.

Company	Aid provided	Date provided
Microsoft	Deployed patches against a targeted "wiper" malware used against Ukrainian authorities, placing their Threat Intelligence Center on high alert for such attacks. It has provided over $400 million worth of support from cloud service, cybersecurity to humanitarian aid.	Ongoing since 23 February
FTX	Provided the equivalent of $25 in FTX cryptocurrency to each Ukrainian citizen.	24 February
Google	Provided $2M in donated ads to help those affected find resources.	25 February
KFC	Opened their kitchens to prepare food for those in need, especially for the military and hospitals.	26 February
McDonald's	Donated food to local councils to be distributed to those in need, including water, vegetables, fruit, eggs, rolls, and salads.	27 February
Airbnb	Provided free short-term housing for up to 100,000 Ukrainian refugees.; Waived fees for Ukrainian Airbnb hosts so that foreign donors could book rentals, without staying there, as a direct donation to hosts.	28 February
Bolt	Bolt will donate 5 million EUR = 5% of every order in Europe to Non-Governmental Organisations (NGOs)	1 March
Visa Inc.	$2 million to the US fund for UNICEF to provide humanitarian aid for Ukrainians.	1 March 2022
Boeing	$2 million donated to humanitarian organisations helping Ukrainian civilians.	2 March 2022
General Electric	$4 million worth of medical equipment including handheld ultrasound devices, mobile X-ray units, ventilators and patient monitors and $500,000 to the International Rescue Committee and Airlink.	2 March 2022
Lego	110 million DKK for humanitarian aid via Red Cross, Save the Children and UNICEF. 100 million DKK for rebuilding Ukraine's education system and educating Ukrainian child refugees in Europe.	1 March 1 September
Snap	Pledged $15 million in humanitarian aid.	1 March
Amazon	Pledged $10 million in aid; using its logistics capability for supplies and cybersecurity expertise.	2 March
Falck (emergency services company)	30 ambulances to Ukraine, Moldova, and Poland	3 March
Kakao	Donated ₩4.2 billion (approx. $3.65 million) worth of Klay cryptocurrency to UNICEF.; Separately, various fundraising campaigns through Together Kakao have gathered ₩430 million (approx. $374,000) as of 5 March.	2 ~ 5 March
Wizz Air	Provided 100,000 airline tickets free of charge, to refugees, for short-distance flights from Poland, Slovakia, Hungary and Romania in March 2022.	2 March
Uber	Raised over $5 million to donate to UNHCR, UNICEF, World Food Programme and other charities.; Provided over 100,000 free trips to Ukrainian refugees and aid workers.; Free rides for healthcare workers and patients who require regular treatments. Free medicine delivery for seniors.; Software support for UN aid agencies for food delivery and Ukrainian Ministry of Culture for preservation of cultural heritage.	3 March
Meta Platforms	Committed $15 million to support humanitarian efforts in Ukraine and neighboring countries.	3 March
Pearl Abyss	Provided ₩100 million (approx. $87,000) in emergency medical relief funds	3 March
SK Group	Provided ₩1.2 billion (approx. $1 million)	3 March
CD Projekt RED	Suspended all sales in Russia and Belarus, and donated $242,000 to humanitarian aid in Ukraine.	3 March
Raiffeisen Bank International	Raiffeisen Bank in Ukraine donated 5 million euros to the Red Cross for its humanitarian mission.	3 March
Medi-Tox	South Korean biopharmaceutical company Medi-Tox provided ₩100 million (approx. $87,000) to the Ukrainian Embassy in Seoul.; Donated ₩200 million (approx. $174,000) worth of biopharmaceutical goods to Ukrainian company EMET for free.	4 March
Grammarly	Ukrainian-founded Grammarly stated to donate all the profits it made in Russia and Belarus since 2014. It plans to create a $5 million fund, in addition to already donated $1 million to Ukrainian humanitarian communities.	5 March
Samsung Electronics	Donated $5 million to the Ukrainian Red Cross Society and other charities.; Donated $1 million worth of personal electronics and white goods to the people of Ukraine.; Separately, a private fundraising campaign by Samsung Electronics employees will donate additional funds.	5 March
Activision Blizzard	The videogame company suspended all sales in Russia for the duration of the conflict. The company also pledged to make a matching donation double the value of every donation made by its employees.	6 March
Binance	Donated $10 million for humanitarian needs and donated $2.5 million to UNICEF on 7 March to help Ukrainian children.	7 March
Erste Group	Erste Group makes donations of one million euros each to Caritas and the Red Cross.; ERSTE Foundation provides an additional one million euros through its partner networks.; Banking platform George introduces simple approach for making Ukraine donations.	7 March
Hyundai Motors	Donated $1 million to the Red Cross earmarked as emergency relief for Ukraine.	8 March
POSCO International	Donated $500,000 to the Red Cross earmarked as emergency relief for Ukraine.; Donated medical supplies directly to Ukrainian hospitals.	8 March
TYM	Donated 10 tractors along with other farming equipment to the Ukrainian Embassy in Seoul.; Donated ₩100 million (approx. $87,000) in cash for Ukrainian humanitarian relief.	8 March
Fulfillment Hub USA	Aided the stocking, maintaining, and delivering of items donated to the Ukrainian civilians and military, including food, medical supplies and blankets.	Ongoing since 16 March
FIFA	Donated $1,000,000 to humanitarian efforts in Ukraine and sent first aid supplies to the Ukrainian Association of Football.	20 March
Epic Games	Donated all revenue from in-game sales from Fortnite over a two-week period to Direct Relief, UNICEF, WFP, UNHCR, and World Central Kitchen to support their humanitarian relief efforts in Ukraine. Xbox also donated its service fee from in-game sales of Fortnite to the same charities. A total of $144 million was donated.	21 March to 3 April
Deutsche Bahn	Deutsche Bahn initiated a "railbridge" in March 2022 and began delivering over 10,000 tons of humanitarian aid.	24 March 2022
Balenciaga	Announced that all proceeds from a new line of t-shirts featuring the Ukrainian flag and a trident design would benefit United24.	28 July
Karpowership	Unspecified number of powerships. That will produce 500 MV. That could give power for over 1 million households	26 January 2023
Azerenerji	45 transformers and 50 generators.	December 2022
Mars, Incorporated	Mars International donated $4 million to support USAID in Ukraine.	17 March 2023
XTX Markets	Donated $1 million to the HALO Trust to purchase 308 Mine detectors to support demining operations in Ukraine.	21 June 2023
Premier Inn	2,000 mattresses donated and delivered to Ukrainians.	29 February 2024
Wargaming (company)	13 ambulances donated to Ukraine through United 24 delivered May 2024.	May 2024
11 Bit Studios	$50,000 sales revenue donated to support children receiving treatment at Okhmatdyt	12 July 2024
The Coca-Cola Company	$300,000 grant for the Ukrainian Red Cross to improve access to drinking water in southern Ukraine.	15 July 2024
Kane Biotech	2,000 ounces of Revyve antimicrobial wound gel donated to the Government of Ukraine.	23 October 2024
Motex, Kangjian	1.1 million medical masks donated to Ukrainian hospitals and medics with assistance from the Estonia-Taiwan Support Group.	4 February 2025
Helijet	A Sikorsky S-76 air ambulance hospital donated to Ukraine in partnership with the NGOs Ukrainian World Congress, Maple Hope Foundation and Initiative E+.	10 February 2025
Amanita Design	$68,000 raised from game sale proceeds from 26 March to 2 April donated to the charity People In need to provide humanitarian aid for Ukraine.	2 April 2025
Telia Lietuva	35 network switches, 97 servers, 50 data storage units and 2,000 LTE modems donated to sustain Ukrainian digital infrastructure.	April 2025
Avenga	$24,000 donated to the purchase of ambulances and equipment for Ukrainian medics through the United24 platform.	7 May 2025
Norsk Hydro	5,855 jackets and 4,960 flame retardant pants donated to State Emergency Service of Ukraine	2024-25
Brussels Intercommunal Transport Company	36 diesel buses given to Ukraine.	July 2026
Schiphol Airport	29 electric busses donated to Ukraine.	November 2026
Various	€9,136,000 in contributions to the Ukraine Energy Support Fund by the Private Sector.	

=== Other parties ===
UK charity Pickups for Peace donated more than 300 4x4 vehicles filled with humanitarian aid to Ukraine.

- Citizens of Japan donated $35 million.
  - Rakuten founder Hiroshi Mikitani pledged to donate ¥1 billion ($8.7 million) to humanitarian victims in Ukraine on 27 February.
- Citizens of Taiwan donated $945 million NTD (US$33 million) as of 2 April 2022.
- Citizens of South Korea donated $3 million directly to the Ukrainian Embassy in Seoul.
  - Numerous Korean celebrities have donated to Ukraine. Lee Young-ae and Han Ji-min each donated ₩100 million (approx. $87,000). Others including Narsha, Yang Dong-geun, U-KISS, Yim Si-wan, Kim Eun-hee, Jang Hang-jun, etc. as well as Korean politicians also donated varying sums.
  - KOMCA (Korea Music Copyright Association) donated ₩70 million (approx. $61,000) to assist Ukrainian musicians and artists who have become refugees, as well as those artists who have had to stay in Ukraine to fight and are now forced to witness the destruction of Ukrainian cultural heritage caused by the Russian invasion.
  - Other charities and NGOs such as Come Back Alive, the Hope Bridge Korea Disaster Relief Association, the Seoul-based Good Neighbors International, UNICEF, Save the Children, etc., have also received significant donations from Korean citizens.
- Citizens globally have provided ₴11.6 billion to special NBU multi-currency fundraising accounts and over $21 million in cryptocurrency, as of 1 March 2022.
- United Hatzalah of Israel sent a team of 55 medical personnel, doctors, paramedics, and EMTs, on a rotation basis, to assist Ukrainian refugees in Moldova by providing free medical treatment and humanitarian aid to refugees. The EMS organization then began using its Ukrainian based volunteers, as well as those from Israel, to deliver food and medical supplies to hospitals and medical clinics inside Ukraine, while extricating injured and ill people out of Ukraine to receive care in other countries. They airlifted 3,000 Ukrainian refugees to Israel in an operation codenamed Operation Orange Wings.
- Additionally, 40 doctors and paramedics from United Hatzalah of Israel, with medical and humanitarian equipment, went to the Moldova–Ukraine border to assist refugees.
- Many Airbnb users across the globe have booked thousands of apartments in Ukraine, though they have no intention to visit the country.
- Bunq CEO Ali Niknam created a foundation to support Ukrainian refugees in getting to the Netherlands under a highly skilled migrant visa.
- In the United Kingdom, the Disasters Emergency Committee, an umbrella group of 15 British charities, launched a public appeal for humanitarian aid to Ukraine on 4 March 2022. It raised £55 million ($72.5 million) the first day, including personal donations from the British royal family. By 17 March, £200 million had been raised. A televised fundraising concert for the appeal on 29 March called Concert for Ukraine raised a further £13.4 million within 24 hours.
- In Germany, €752 million have been donated (as of End of April 2022) according to a survey by the "German Center for Social Affairs" ("DZI") among 67 aid groups including the three fundraising campaigns Aktion Deutschland Hilft, "Bündnis Entwicklung Hilft" and "Aktionsbündnis Katastrophenhilfe".
- Netflix co-founder Reed Hastings announced a $1 million donation to Razom, a Ukrainian NGO.
- In March 2022, a donation-financed airlift called Ukraine Air Rescue was established under the umbrella of the non-profit German organization European Danube Academy ("Europäische Donau-Akademie"), with more than 100 pilots participating, delivering medical supplies to the Polish-Ukrainian border.
- Citizens of Finland donated nearly €60 million to fundraising campaigns organized by the Finnish Red Cross, Finnish Committee for UNICEF, and Finn Church Aid by 19 May 2022.
- In addition to private donations, numerous American states and local law enforcement agencies are donating surplus protective equipment through the Ukrainian American Coordinating Council and other organizations.
- As of 10 April 2022, Dutch people had donated €160.8 million for Ukraine via a fundraising campaign called Giro 555 with one fire brigade donating seven fire trucks on 30 April.
- The Serbian Orthodox Church decided to send all the donations collected in the churches to the Ukrainian Orthodox Church Citizens of Novi Sad donated clothes, food, blankets, adult diapers The National Council of the Ukrainian national minority in Serbia initiated an action to collect aid for the war-endangered people of Ukraine, and the action is being carried out in several places in Vojvodina. The Red Cross of Serbia opened a dedicated account to which Serbian citizens can donate to help the endangered population of Ukraine. Serbian Chamber of Commerce asked companies from Serbia to help Ukraine. Companies that responded include MK Group, Nestlé Adriatic, Elixir Group, Tobacco Industry Senta, Coca-Cola HBC – Srbija, and Bambi.
- "Blue/Yellow" charity in Lithuania, dedicated for supporting Ukraine, collected over €22.9 million (as of 30 March) from the citizens of Lithuania.
  - On 30 May 2022 Lithuanian citizens raised €5 million for the crowdfunded purchase of a Bayraktar TB2 armed UAV for the Ukrainian military, the drone was subsequently given to Lithuania by Baykar Tech free of charge, with the €6 million collected used for aid. It reached Ukraine on 8 July 2022.
  - Lithuanian civilians also crowdfunded 7 Estonian-made EOS C VTOl reconnaissance drones (two of which were crowdfunded in early May, with the other five being later purchased with the money collected from the TB2 crowdfunder), 110 Lithuanian-made EDM4S Sky Wiper anti drone weapons, 37 WB Electronics Warmates (including launch/control equipment and ammunition), and 18 UJ-23 Topazs for the Ukrainian military.
- On 21 June 2022 Russian journalist Dmitry Muratov auctioned off his Nobel Prize medal for $103.5 million to be donated to UNICEF's Humanitarian Response for Ukrainian Children Displaced by War.
- 11 August 2022, various fire departments in and around the San Francisco Bay area donated enough fire fighting equipment to fill a forty-foot shipping container to be shipped to Poland and then distributed in Ukraine.
- $1.2 million was raised for the Ukraine Crisis Relief Fund by the US Open Tennis Plays for Peace exhibition.
- 30 power generators were donated by a Portuguese football club Benfica
- Ukrainian football club FC Shakhtar Donetsk sent 20 power generators to the City of Power organization in Kherson and 10 power generators for a modular city of the Ukrainian Friends Foundation in Lviv.
- 214 kilograms of medicines were donated by Argentine medical companies
- 500 tonnes of humanitarian aid was donated by the Croatian DOBRO DOBRIM DoDo Association, for refugees in Croatia
- The Argentine National Institute of Yerba Mate donated 128,000 bags of cooked mate for Ukrainian refugees in Poland
- The city of Buenos Aires sent a humanitarian aid package to Ukraine.
- The city of Vienna sent 15 tonnes of relief supplies to the cities of Kyiv and Odesa.
- Austrian citizens sent €124 million via private donations to Ukraine.
- A Belgian association sent 33 tons of medical equipment (March 2023).
- The mayor of Brussels Philippe Close donated two ambulances to the city of Kyiv (May 2022) and an additional two ambulances one year later (May 2023).
- 21 million pesos was donated through a solidarity campaign organized by the Chilean Red Cross (April 2022).
- £81,400 was donated by Caritas Chile for food, water, hygiene and medicine (June 2022).
- Four fire engines were donated by the city of Leipzig on 27 March 2023.
- Hungarian Maltese Relief Service delivered 570 tons of goods worth 1,5 million euros to Ukraine.
- 326 tons were donated by Hungarian citizens to the Hungarian Red Cross.
- US$7–8 million worth of medicines were donated by Indian pharmaceutical companies as on 3 June 2022.
- 11 Mercedes-Benz buses were donated by the Riga municipality-owned Rīgas Satiksme to Kyiv filled with medicine, bandages and other medical materials prepared by Riga 1st Hospital along with other donations from the public on 26 April 2022.
- 15,400 atropine ampoules funded by Lithuanian citizens were sent on 8 April 2022.
- The Estonian Lions Region sent 13 electric generators to Ukraine.
- The Western Tallinn Central Hospital sent 140 hospital beds to Ukraine March 2023
- 171 pieces of body armour and a small number of ballistic helmets donate by Saskatoon Police Service to volunteers and civilians.
- Pro patria Suomi-Ukraina Ry donated six ambulances equipped with defibrillators, ventilators, stretchers and oxygen tanks as well as €150,000 of humanitarian aid to Ukraine.
- 10 hospital beds, 200 wheelchairs, eight electric wheelchairs and 10 walking frames were donated by The Ukrainian Association of New Zealand.
- 26 Tatra T4D-M1 trams were donated to the city of Dnipro by the city of Leipzig.
- 51 generators and 850 metres of cable donating to Kyiv by the city of Leipzig in early 2026. 21 generators and 290 metres of cable donated to Kyiv by the city of Hamburg in early 2026.
- Seven fire engines with additional equipment donated to Ukrainian firefighters by the Tipperary Fire and Rescue Service
- £1.3 million donated by Lord Michael Ashcroft to the Olena Zelenska Foundation.
- 200 vehicles including fire engines, ambulances and pickup trucks donated to Ukraine by Taiwanese businessman Pai Tsan-jung.
- One ambulance filled with medical supplies donated by the city of Sonoma, California to the city of Kaniv.
- The city of Dortmund has donated a sewer cleaning vehicle to the city of Zhytomyr November 2024.
- North Rhine-Westphalia has donated six fire and police vehicles to Dnipropetrovsk Oblast November 2024.
- The International Atomic Energy Agency has donated two ambulances to provide medical support for Ukrainian nuclear powerplant staff.
- Approximately 300 laptops, desktop computers, monitors, and accessories donated to Odesa schools by Tallinn City
- 400 generators and 70 stoves donated to Ukrainian civilians by the charity New Forest For Ukraine.
- Three fire engines and a truck full of humanitarian supplies provided to Ukraine by the charity Scottish Emergency Rescue Association.
- $107,590 raised by Russian opposition artists, musicians and writers in the Art Against War charity auction for Rubikus.HelpUA and Let's Do It! providing aid to frontline communities in Ukraine January 2025.
- $25 million aud provided by the Minderoo Foundation for demining and humanitarian aid.
- Four fire engines donated to Ukraine by West Yorkshire Fire Authority.
- 3,000 explosive identification manuals provided to Ukrainian sappers by the Canadian charity Mriya Aid.
- Two Ford Interceptor police cars donated by Sterling City Council to Ukrainian emergency services via US Ambulances for Ukraine.
- 149 fire and rescue vehicles and over 215,000 pieces of fire fighting equipment donated to Ukraine by 16 fire and rescue services in England and Wales in eight convoys.
- A Božena 5 unmanned demining vehicle, a tractor, trailer, specialised van and a thermal drone for Kharkiv firefighters crowd funded by Czech organisation Gifts for Putin.
- €302,158 raised for Okhmatdy Children's Hospital by the Czech organisation Gifts for Putin.
- €7.04 million crowd funded for generators and backup batteries for Kyiv civilians by Gifts for Putin.
- A retired fire engine donated to Ukraine by Peoria City Council March 2025.
- Nine ambulances donated to Ukraine by Finnish volunteers April 2025.
- 59 ambulances filled with medical equipment and supplies donated to Ukraine by the London Ambulance Service.
- A 12 cynlinder 600 kVA combined heat and power plant donated by the University of Kassel to an unspecified hospital in western Ukraine.
- Two minibuses and projectors, laptops, printers, tablets, generators, folding furniture, thermal blankets, first aid kits and tents donated by The Estonian Voluntary Rescue Association to the psychological units of the State Emergency Service of Ukraine May 2025.
- Two firefighting vehicles donated by Swedish volunteers to Ukraine State Emergency Services in Donetsk Oblast.
- A 10-metre Scissor lift, a truck and a minibus donated by the town of Borna to the sister city of Irpin for infrastructure repair through the German Society for International Cooperation.
- Over 100 lorries of humanitarian has been delivered to Ukraine by the Scottish charity Tayside and Strathearn Help for Ukraine since February 2022.
- 108 fire engines, ambulances and SUVs provided to Ukrainian Emergency Services by the American charity US Ambulances For Ukraine.
- 14,500 generators donated to Ukraine by the German organisation Blau-Gelbes Kreuz.
- A chemical and radiological reconnaissance vehicle provided to Ukrainian Emergency services by The Organization for Security and Co-operation in Europe.
- 75 generators donated to Kyiv Oblast by Angolan businessman Bento Adriano Mendes.
- £18 million in humanitarian aid provided by the charity Ukraine Relief.
- 28 ambulances delivered to Ukraine by the Finnish Lions Club.
- €200,000 of medical equipment donated by the city of Šiauliai to the city of Khmelnytskyi.
- 11 ambulances donated by Cologne to Dnipropetrovsk Oblast.
- €149,000 raised by Latvian state broadcaster LSM for the mental and physical rehabilitation of wounded Ukrainian soldiers.
- $50,000 raised and donated by Denis Kopotun
- 15 buses purchased for Vinnytsia by Polish group Sikorki na Ukrainie to replace those destroyed by Russia.
- 10 former police vehicles donated by Schleswig-Holstein to Kherson Oblast.
- 1,300 hospital beds, a 50 bed field hospital furnished with oxygen concentrators and wheelchairs, 20 portable generators, 11 million bandages and thousands of medical kits donated by the State of California.

==== Beer for Ukraine ====
At the beginning of the invasion, Ukrainian brewery Pravda Beer Theatre, stopped brewing beer and started making Molotov cocktails. However the brewery shares their recipes and artwork to craft breweries worldwide to start making their beer and asked, if they do so, to make donations to their relief fund efforts. Many beer breweries worldwide began producing special beers whose proceeds would be donated to Ukraine, and spoke out against Putin's illegal actions. A number of breweries including Boston Beer Company brew the Resolve beer brand which donates all of its proceeds to Ukraine. The Boston Beer Company also donated $50,000 to World Central Kitchen, which provides prepared meals in Ukraine. Other breweries are brewing beer where (a part of) the revenue is donated to Ukraine, as shown on the website brewforukraine.beer. Also Untappd started a campaign to support Ukrainian beers.

=== Appealed and pledged by United Nations ===
The UN Office for the Coordination of Humanitarian Affairs made an appeal for $1.7 billion in aid to the 2022 Ukrainian refugee crisis – including $1.1 billion in humanitarian aid to Ukraine – on 1 March 2022. United Nations's under-Secretary-General for Humanitarian Affairs and Emergency Relief Coordinator Martin Griffiths announced that $1.5 billion had been pledged. The United Nations Entity for Gender Equality has allocated over $14.6 million towards financing 120 civil society organisations in Ukraine organisations supporting women and girls in Ukraine and Ukrainian refugees in Moldova. Eight modular heating units are to be installed in Ukrainian hospitals as part of a World Health Organisation initiative. UNICEF has donated 336 medical kits valued at $200,000 to thirteen communities in Zhytomyr Oblast May 2024. The United Nations Development Programme has provided $1 million rehabilitation equipment to Ukrainian healthcare facilities June 2024. By 29 July 2024 the UN Food and Agriculture Organization has donated 114 generators and pledged another 131 generators to food producers and frontline companies in Ukraine with financial support from the German government. In September 2024 WHO opened a modular primary health-care clinic in the village of Tsyrkuny in Kharkiv Oblast. The United Nations Development Programme provided ten specially equipped vehicles to support health care and social services in Ukraine supported by the EU, Canadian and Danish governments. In October 2024, the United Nations Office for the Coordination of Humanitarian Affairs along with partner nations announced the allocation of $20 million in support of to support local organizations that help vulnerable categories of displaced civilians in Ukraine. $870,000 worth of equipment provided by the World Food Programme to small bakeries located to frontline regions of Ukraine to aid civilian food supplies. Eight refrigerated vans delivered to the Ukrainian ministry of health with support from the EU. 200 portable charging donated by Germany provided to Olena Zelenska Foundation by the UNHCR. 12 armoured medical vehicles with equipment provided to the State Emergency Service by UNDP, funded by Sweden Luxembourg, The Netherlands and Spain. 106 generators totalling 15.1 MW donated by UNICEF to Ukraine. 11 transformers pledged by the UNDP. A $2.6 million initiative to identify farmland contaminated by unexploded ordinance in support of Ukrainian small farmers.

== Ukraine total aid by country ==
This list shows the number of countries support to Ukraine: Total bilateral allocations incl. EU aid - Allocations January 24, 2022 to December 31, 2024.

Rank	Donor	Total bilateral allocations incl. EU aid, € billion
1	United States	€114.15 billion
2	Germany	€28.02 billion
3	France	€14.91 billion
4	United Kingdom	€14.81 billion
5	Japan	€10.53 billion
6	Netherlands	€9.67 billion
7	Denmark	€9.18 billion
8	Italy	€9.02 billion
9	Canada	€8.28 billion
10	Sweden	€7.04 billion
11	Poland	€6.99 billion
12	Spain	€5.92 billion
13	Belgium	€3.77 billion
14	Finland	€3.62 billion
15	Norway	€3.35 billion
16	Austria	€2.21 billion
17	Czech Republic	€2.08 billion
18	Lithuania	€1.28 billion
19	Slovakia	€1.05 billion
20	Australia	€1.01 billion

== Other responses ==
Initially, a Kawasaki C-2 of the Japan Self Defence Force had been given permission to land and fly on to the UAE, for carrying aid from India and Singapore. India responded that only civilian planes are allowed to deliver aid. This forced Japan to change how it delivered its humanitarian aid.

Taiwan has kept mainly to humanitarian and financial aid.

== See also ==
- Corporate responses to the Russian invasion of Ukraine
- Ukraine Democracy Defense Lend-Lease Act of 2022

=== Invasion ===
- Prelude to the Russian invasion of Ukraine
- Russian invasion of Ukraine
- Timeline of the Russian invasion of Ukraine

=== Reactions ===
- Potential enlargement of NATO
- Government and intergovernmental reactions to the Russian invasion of Ukraine
- Potential enlargement of the European Union
- Protests against the Russian invasion of Ukraine
- Reactions to the 2021–2022 Russo-Ukrainian crisis
- Reactions to the Russian invasion of Ukraine

=== Sanctions, boycotts, censorship and cyberwarfare ===
- Boycott of Russia and Belarus
- International sanctions during the Russo-Ukrainian War
- List of companies that applied sanctions during the Russo-Ukrainian War
- Russo–Ukrainian cyberwarfare

=== Humanitarian crisis ===
- Casualties of the Russo-Ukrainian War
- Ukrainian refugee crisis (2022–present)
- War crimes in the Russian invasion of Ukraine
