= Alexander Kirillov Jr. =

Russian-born American mathematician

Alexander Alexandrovich Kirillov Jr. (Russian: Александр Александрович Кириллов) is a Russian-born American mathematician, working in the area of representation theory and Lie groups. He is a son of Russian mathematician Alexandre Kirillov.

== Biography ==
Kirillov received his master's degree from Moscow State University in 1989 and Ph.D. from Yale University in 1995. He is currently a professor at State University of New York at Stony Brook.

Kirillov is a teacher of the project School Nova, trying to establish traditions of the Russian Mathematical Schools on American soil.

He is also a member of the international volunteer organization Rubikus.HelpUA that helps Ukrainian refugees stranded in Russia after the Russian invasion of Ukraine to evacuate to EU.

== Publications ==
- Bakalov, Bojko; Kirillov, Alexander Jr. (2001), Lectures on tensor categories and modular functors, University Lecture Series, vol. 21, Providence, R.I.: American Mathematical Society, ISBN 978-0-8218-2686-7, MR 1797619
- Kirillov, Alexander Jr. (2008), An introduction to Lie groups and Lie algebras, Cambridge Studies in Advanced Mathematics, vol. 113, Cambridge University Press, doi:10.1017/CBO9780511755156, ISBN 978-0-521-88969-8, MR 2440737
- Kirillov, Alexander Jr. (2016), Quiver Representations and Quiver Varieties, Graduate Studies in Mathematics, vol. 174, Providence, R.I.: American Mathematical Society, ISBN 978-1-4704-2307-0
