= Ukrainian Red Cross Society =

Humanitarian non-governmental organization in Ukraine

- Товариство Червоного Хреста України
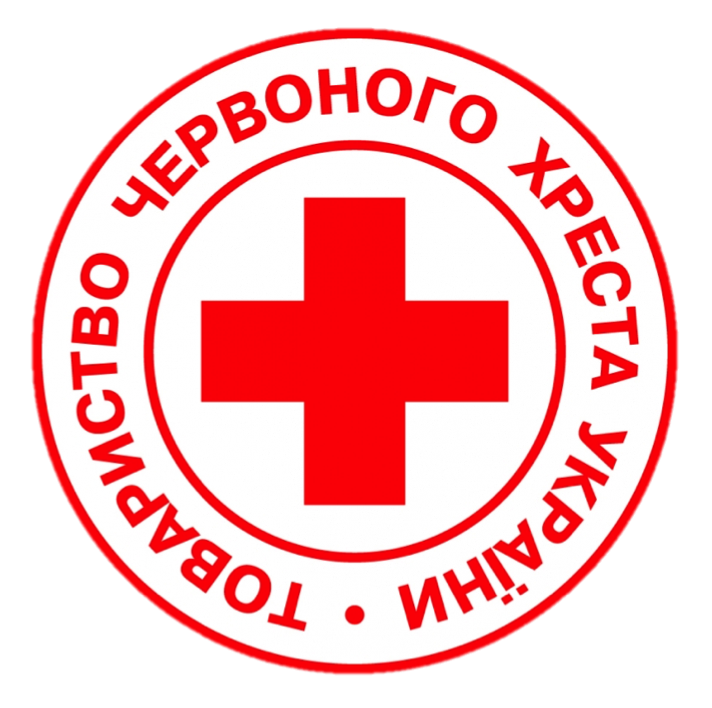
- Formation: April 18, 1918
- Purpose: Humanitarian aid
- Headquarters: Kyiv
- Region served: Ukraine
- President: Mykola Polishchuk (acting)
- Main organ: Board of Governors
- Budget: US$12 million (2014)
- Website: redcross.org.ua/en/

The Ukrainian Red Cross Society (Ukrainian: Товариство Червоного Хреста України, romanized: Tovarystvo Chervonoho Khresta Ukrayiny) is a non-profit humanitarian and charitable association of Ukraine. It operates in disaster management, health and care, tracing service, youth activities/volunteers, and activities related to the protection of human dignity. Since 1993, the Ukrainian Red Cross Society has been a member of the International Federation of Red Cross/Red Crescent Societies.

== Early history ==
The Ukrainian Red Cross Society was established on April 18, 1918, in Kyiv as an independent humanitarian society of the Ukrainian People's Republic. Its immediate tasks were to help refugees and prisoners of war, care of handicapped people, orphaned children, fighting famine and epidemics, support and organize sick quarters, hospitals and public canteens.

The Ukrainian Red Cross operated as a branch of the Soviet Red Cross from the 1920s, when Ukrainian territory was merged into the Soviet Union, until 1991.

== During World War II ==
When the structure of the UPA was unified in 1943, the Ukrainian Red Cross was re-established as a separate body from the Soviet Red Cross. The service provided care for the sick and wounded UPA soldiers, attracted well-qualified doctors, prepared the supply and manufacture of medicine, equipped underground hospitals and conducted training classes for new physicians and soldiers of the UPA and prepared special medical manuals. Doctors worked in regional military hospitals which treated the wounded who had suffered from the attacks of German, Soviet or Polish punitive groups.

== Present time ==
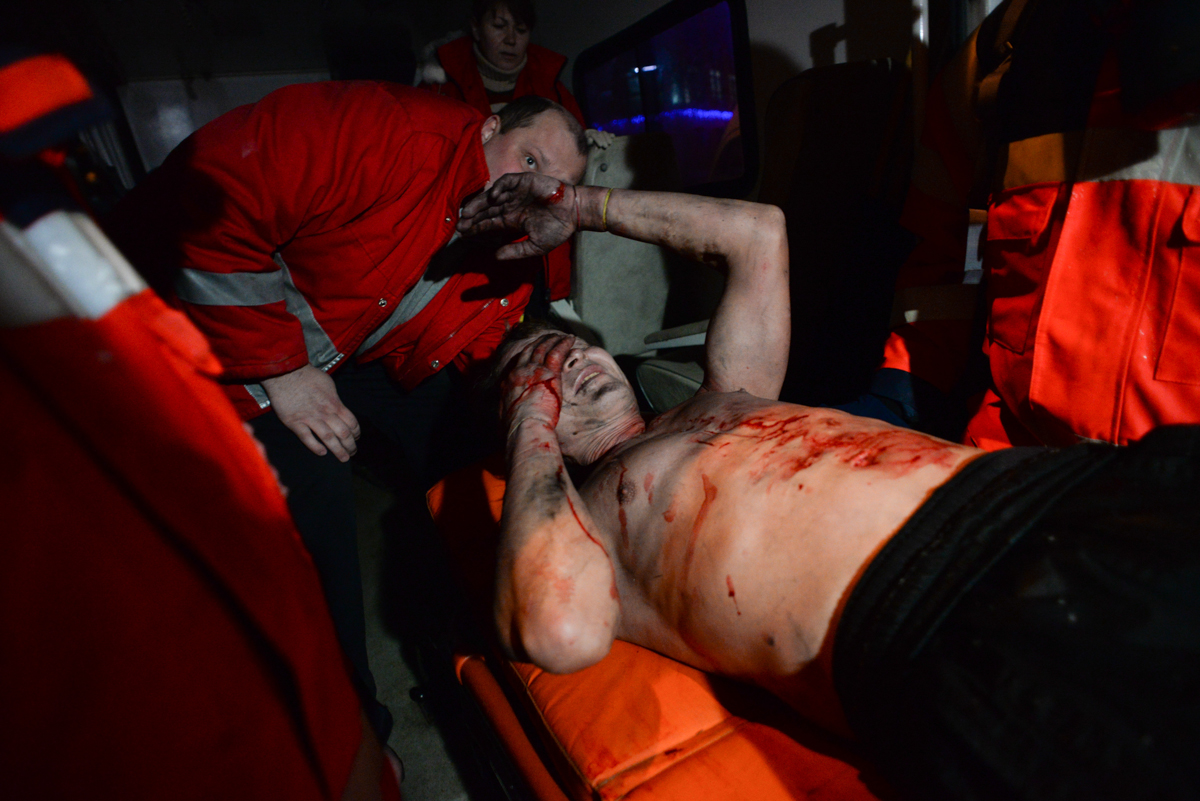
Volunteers administering first aid to a wounded Euromaidan protester

The Red Cross law was passed by the Ukrainian parliament in 1999.

In 2001, the Ukrainian Red Cross involved more than 6.3 million supporters and activists. Its Visiting Nurses Service has 3,200 qualified nurses. The organization takes part in more than 40 humanitarian programmes all over Ukraine, which are mostly funded by public donations and corporate partnerships. By its own estimations, the Society annually provides services to more than 105,000 lonely elderly people, about 23,000 people living with disability during the Second World War and disabled workers, more than 25,000 war veterans, and more than 8,000 adults disabled since childhood. The Red Cross also provides assistance for orphaned and disabled children.

== Response to the 2022 Russian invasion of Ukraine ==
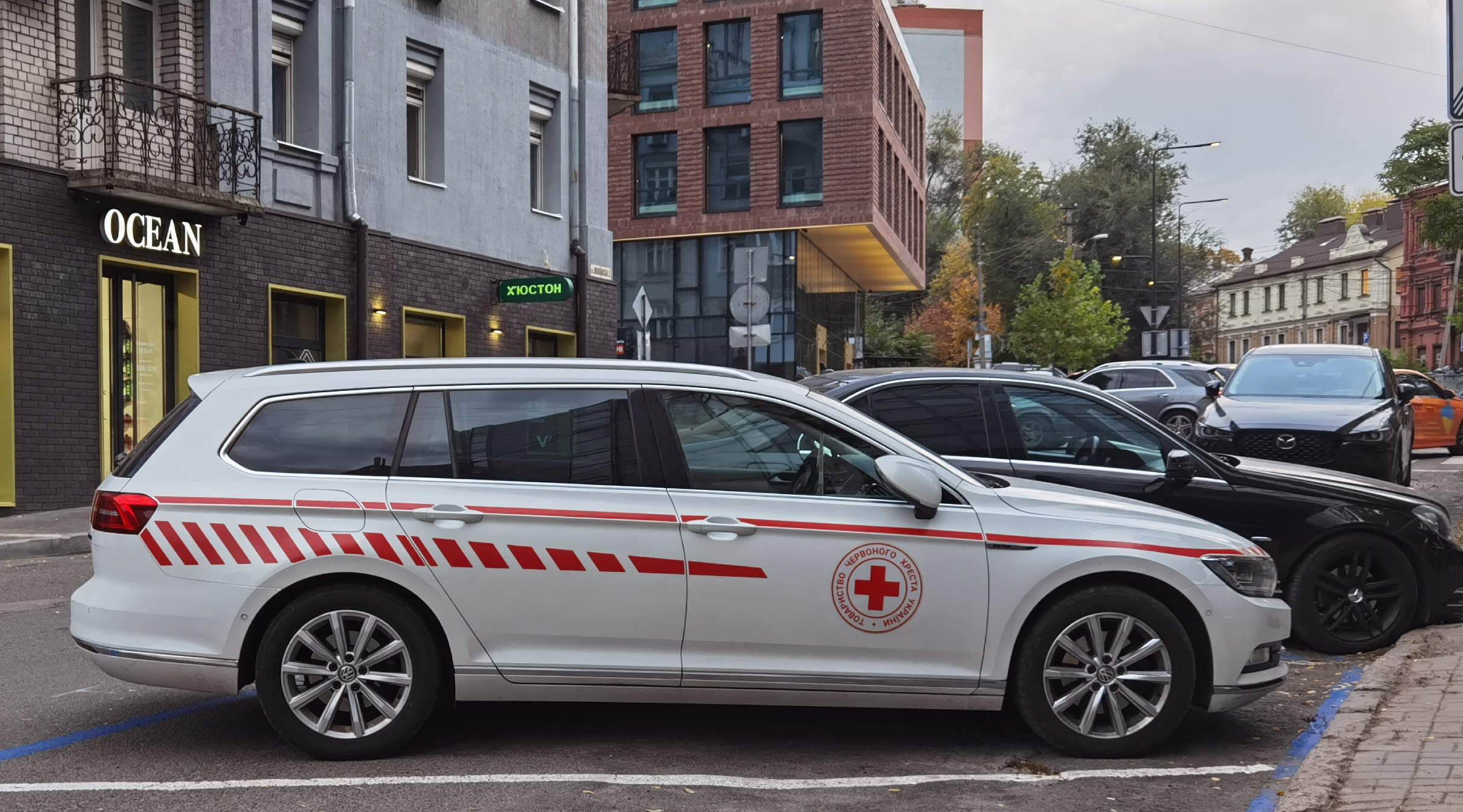
Red cross Ukraine car in Dnipro.

The Ukrainian Red Cross Society is working closely with the International Committee of the Red Cross and International Federation of the Red Cross and Red Crescent Societies to provide neutral and impartial support in the following areas:

- Providing protection and assistance to the civilian population, including psychosocial support, as well as to those who no longer participate in hostilities;
- Distribution of relief assistance (food and non-food items) to the civilian population, including people displaced and people on the move;
- Provision of first aid and other health services to the wounded and sick in accordance with international humanitarian law (IHL) and Ukrainian legislation;
- Supporting authorities with dignified management of dead bodies and forensic expertise;
- Reestablishing family links between separated family members with a specific focus on unaccompanied minors and extremely vulnerable persons such as the elderly and disabled;
- Promoting respect for International Humanitarian Law, ensuring respect and dignity for people deprived of freedom.
- Integrated assistance to people in need, including shelter and cash assistance, when the situation allows.
