= Rubikus.HelpUA =

- Рубикус
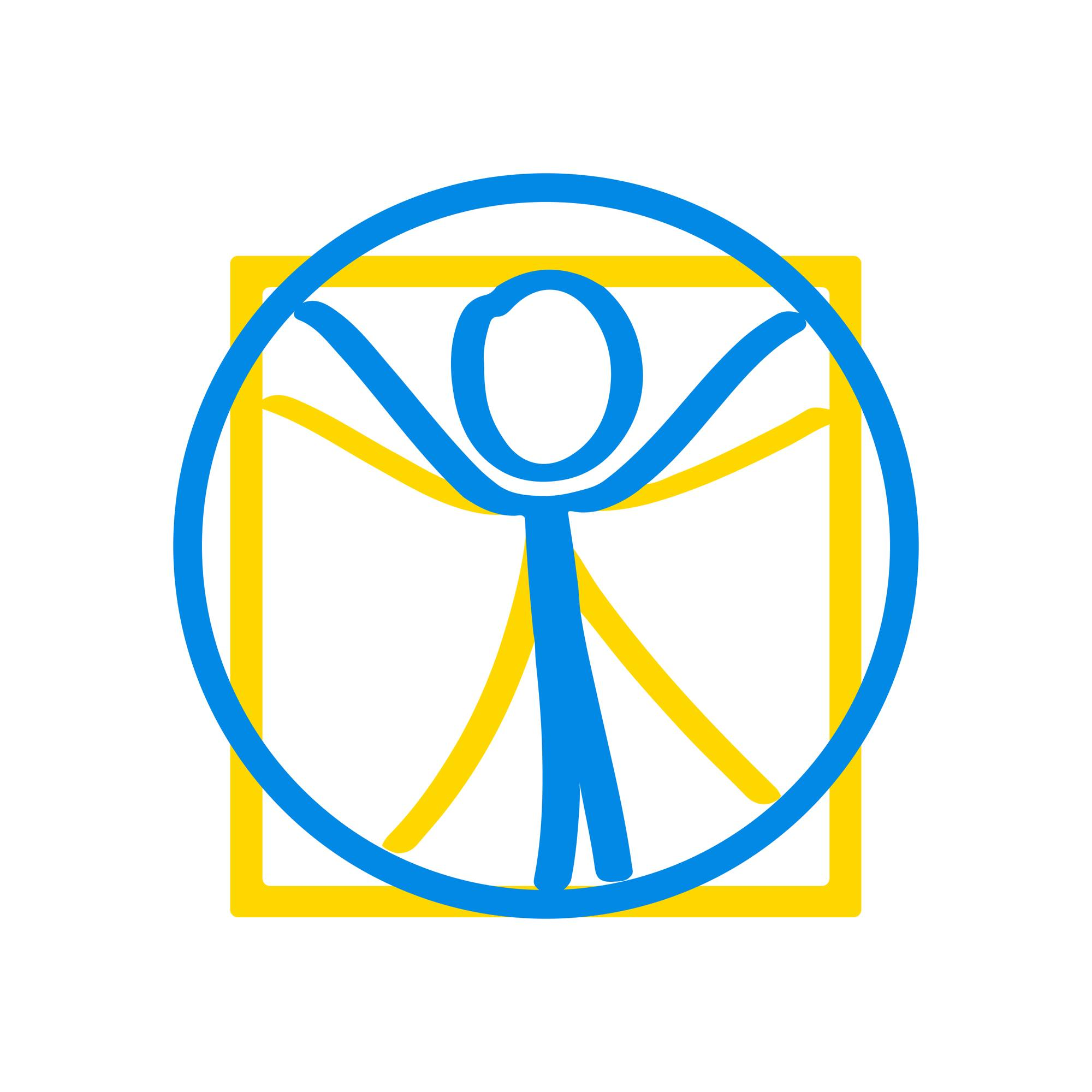
- Formation: 2022; 4 years ago
- Legal status: Active
- Location: Various countries
- Key people: Svetlana Vodolazskaya; Rita Vinokur; Alexander Kirillov Jr. Anna Tsimelzon; Olga Kobzeva; Natalya Polyakova
- Website: helpua.rubikus.de

Rubikus.HelpUA is a non-profit volunteer project that evacuates Ukrainian citizens (including those stranded in Russia and Russian-occupied territories) to EU countries. It started operating on 24 February 2022, right after the beginning of the Russian invasion of Ukraine, as an offshoot of the German organization "Rubikus e.V.", which specialized in educational projects.

Rubikus.HelpUA volunteers are working remotely from all over the world. The organization's volunteers help the Ukrainian refugees by coordinating their route through Europe, providing them with accommodation, and arranging specialized transportation services for elderly people and people with disabilities.

The project leaders are Svetlana Vodolazskaya and Rita Vinokur. Among volunteers of Rubikus.HelpUA, many are IT, education, and science professionals, such as the Russian-American mathematician Alexander Kirillov Jr.

In December 2025, Rubikus was designated as an undesirable organization in Russia.
