= Piers Morgan Uncensored =

British television programme

- Genre: Talk show Debate show Cultural commentary
- Created by: Piers Morgan
- Presented by: Piers Morgan
- Country of origin: United Kingdom
- Original language: English

Production
- News editor: Alex Campbell
- Production locations: Ealing Broadcast Centre (2022–2023); The News Building (2023–present)
- Running time: 47-60 minutes
- Production companies: News UK (2022–2025); Wake Up Productions (2025–present)

Original release
- Network: TalkTV
- Release: 25 April 2022 – 8 February 2024
- Network: YouTube (Note: A highlights version began broadcasting on 5 from 12 September 2025.)
- Release: 19 February 2024 – present

Piers Morgan Uncensored is a British talk show created and presented by Piers Morgan. Originally broadcast on TalkTV (now known as Talk) from 25 April 2022, the show features Morgan giving direct-to-camera commentary on current events, and hosting guests for interviews and debates. The show has been described by Morgan and its producers as a "no-cancel zone" and a celebration of free speech.

The show left TalkTV on 8 February 2024 due to unsatisfactory viewing figures, despite regularly winning its 8pm timeslot against other news channels. The show resumed 11 days later, with full episodes being broadcast exclusively on the show's YouTube channel. Since September 2025, a 90-minute weekly highlights show from YouTube episodes of the show has aired on 5, marking its return to terrestrial television. It was also broadcast internationally by Sky News Australia in Australia and Fox Nation in the United States.

Like its original parent channel TalkTV, Piers Morgan Uncensored has been noted by commentators to have an anti-woke political orientation. (Note: Attributed to multiple sources:) Although Morgan has said he does not consider himself right-wing, describing his role on the show as that of a "ringmaster", he has named US conservative podcasts like The Megyn Kelly Show and The Tucker Carlson Show as influences on the show. It has been involved in numerous controversies since its launch, particularly regarding its choice of guests and discussion topics; the show has been criticised for hosting conspiracy theorists, manosphere influencers, and far-right figures.

== History ==
=== TalkTV (2022–2024) ===
Morgan left Good Morning Britain and ITV in March 2021 following a controversy over his remarks about Oprah with Meghan and Harry, which included a heated on-air argument with Alex Beresford.

On 16 September 2021, News UK announced its new channel TalkTV would launch in 2022, with Morgan being the first name signed up. The show made its debut on 25 April 2022. The opening two editions of the programme featured a two-part interview with current US president Donald Trump.

On 6 June 2022, TalkTV aired a two-hour special of the show to cover that day's Conservative Party vote of confidence in the leadership of Boris Johnson. Extended versions of the programme were also aired in July 2022 as the government crisis unfolded, leading to the resignation of Johnson.

The 25 July 2022 edition of the show began three days of editions covering Morgan's visit to Ukraine, where he was invited by First Lady of Ukraine Olena Zelenska to host her second Kyiv Summit of First Ladies and Gentlemen. Morgan also recorded an hour-long interview with President Volodymyr Zelenskyy and his wife First Lady Olena Zelenska, the first interview the couple have given to international television, and which was broadcast on 27 July.

A three-hour special edition was aired on the evening of 8 September 2022, shortly after the announcement of the death of Queen Elizabeth II, reflecting on the queen's life following the breaking news. A two-hour special edition was aired on the evening following the state funeral of Elizabeth II on 19 September 2022.

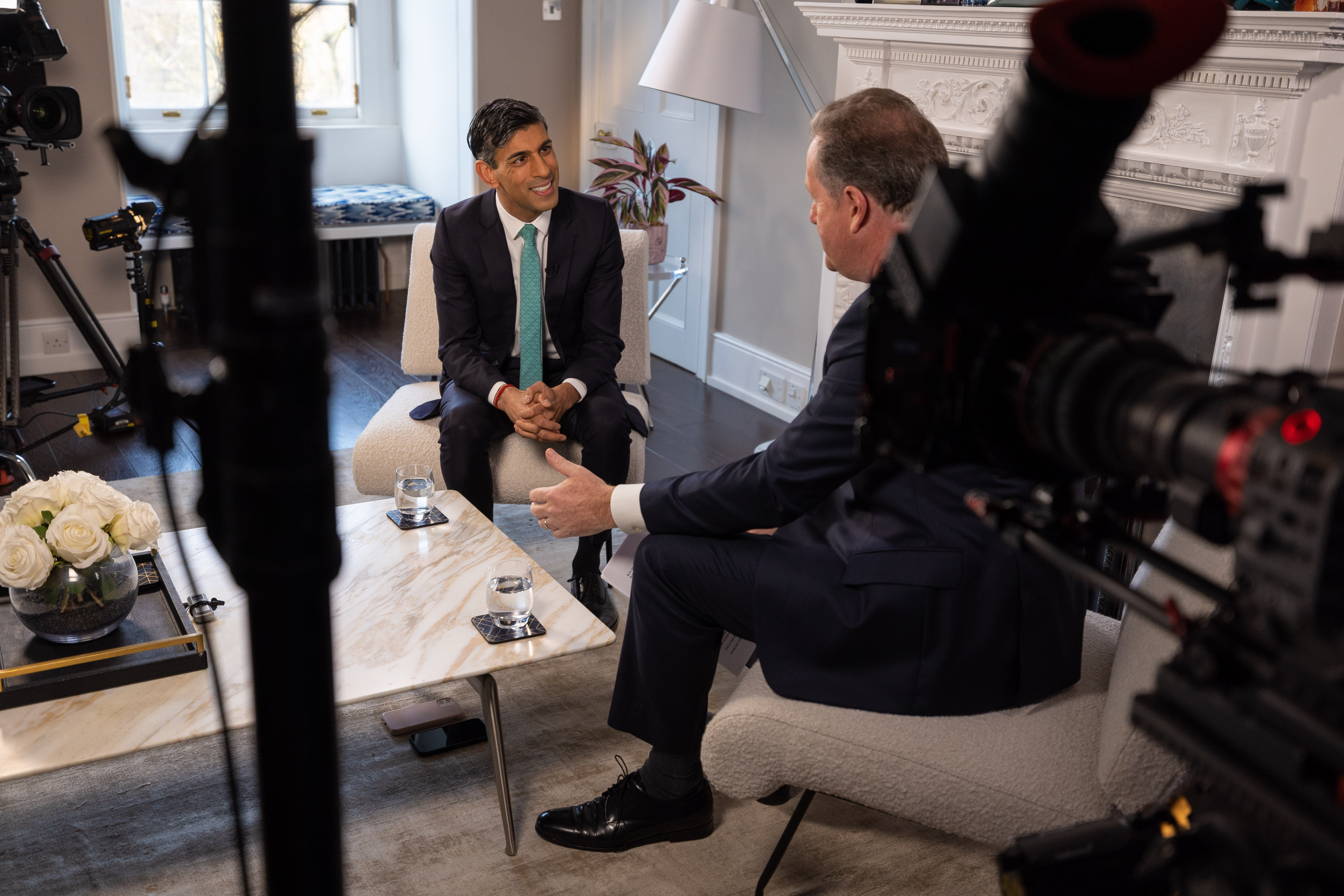
Morgan filming his interview with Rishi Sunak for an episode of the show

In February 2023, Morgan recorded an interview with Rishi Sunak, the prime minister of the United Kingdom at 10 Downing Street in which Sunak said that he would publish his tax returns. The interview, which aired on 2 February, gave the show an average audience of 120,500, and putting TalkTV ahead of its main rivals on BBC News, Sky News and GB News during the 8.00–9.00pm timeslot. In September 2023, Morgan recorded a one-hour interview with Luis Rubiales, the former president of the Spanish Football Association, following controversy after he kissed Spanish women's football player Jenni Hermoso at the 2023 FIFA Women's World Cup final. Writing in The Guardian, Suzanne Wrack described Morgan's line of questioning as weak.

=== YouTube (2024–present) ===
Piers Morgan Uncensored

YouTube information
- Channel: PiersMorganUncensored
- Subscribers: 4.46 million
- Views: 1.40 billion
- Last updated: 10 August 2026

During an interview with The Times in February 2024, Morgan announced that the show was leaving TalkTV to move to his YouTube channel due to the "unnecessary straitjacket" of television scheduling that prevented him from conducting in-depth interviews, and because of poor viewing figures on TalkTV, which were in the tens of thousands compared to the YouTube channel's 2.3 million subscribers. Morgan also felt moving the programme to YouTube would enable him to build a global audience. The final edition to air regularly on TalkTV was shown on 8 February, ending its broadcast with TalkTV, Sky News Australia and Fox Nation that broadcast internationally which are owned by News Corp. Morgan's production company Wake Up Productions bought out the rights for the show from News UK in early 2025, with an agreement that News UK would continue to share advertising revenue for the show until at least 2029.

In September 2025, and following a deal between Morgan and 5, Piers Morgan Uncensored made a return to television with a weekly 90-minute show showing highlights from the YouTube recordings. The deal was reported to be the first between a major UK broadcaster and a YouTube channel. Later that year, Sky News reported that Morgan had secured $30 million in a fundraising round, alongside a valuation of roughly $130 million, with plans to turn the Uncensored brand into a "broad-based global media business".

== Guest presenters ==
In July 2022, it was announced that Jeremy Kyle would take over as a stand-in presenter from 1 August to 5 September while Piers Morgan was on holiday.

On 21 October, it was announced that Conservative MP Nadine Dorries would guest present two editions of Piers Morgan Uncensored on 24 and 25 October to coincide with the Conservative Party leadership election, and that she would be joined by Emily Sheffield, former editor of the London Evening Standard. Dorries' poor reception as a presenter prompted Steph McGovern to describe the show as "Piers Morgan Unwatched" while presenting the 28 October 2022 edition of BBC One's Have I Got News for You. Responding on Twitter the following day, Morgan posted a link to a Sun article that reported her own show, Steph's Packed Lunch had recorded zero viewers when it was launched in 2020 along with the comment: "Hear you were gobbing off about my @PiersUncensored ratings on #HIGFY last night @StephLunch – you sure you're the best person to do that?".

== Production ==
Piers Morgan Uncensored first aired from a purpose-built studio within the Ealing Broadcast Centre in Ealing, West London, a for-hire facility built in 2021 by Timeline Television Ltd. In April 2023 Piers Morgan Uncensored moved to a new studio within The News Building at London Bridge, along with Jeremy Kyle Live, which had also been previously produced at Ealing.

Piers Morgan Uncensored was also broadcast internationally by Sky News Australia in Australia and Fox Nation in the United States, which are both owned by News Corp (News Corp Australia and Fox Corporation).

Despite departing TalkTV, the show continues to be produced at the News UK building in London, using the same studio as before.

== Reception ==
Overnight viewing figures indicated that the first edition of Piers Morgan Uncensored was watched by 317,000 viewers. The next week's Monday edition, aired on 2 May 2022, fell further, with an average audience of 62,000. Morgan's YouTube channel's show episodes reported around 10,000 views. The programme has experienced a decline in viewers since its opening week, with the 18 May 2022 edition reported to have attracted 10,000 viewers.

On 8 August 2022, the Daily Telegraph reported that Piers Morgan Uncensored attracted an average audience of 33,900 for the edition broadcast on 28 July.

On 20 April 2023, Piers Morgan Uncensored's YouTube channel reached one million subscribers. The programme's YouTube channel reached two million subscribers in November 2023, prompting TalkTV to claim the programme had "the world's fastest-growing current affairs Youtube [sic] channel". At the time of Morgan's departure from TalkTV, his YouTube channel had 2.3 million subscribers.

=== Criticism ===
In June 2025, Iranian-American political scientist Kaveh L. Afrasiabi filed a multi-million dollar defamation lawsuit against Piers Morgan and his producer, Bharati Naik, still pending in the federal court in Boston. In January 2023, Morgan attracted criticism on social media following a conversation with Tina Brown in which the pair criticised Prince Harry's memoir, Spare, and after Morgan also threw a copy of the book in the bin while on air. Many viewers commented how they had had enough of the coverage.

Morgan faced criticism after comments made on the 18 January 2023 edition of his show about Madonna ahead of the Celebration Tour, her 40th anniversary world tour. Morgan criticised the singer for "the whole trying to be a sex kitten thing when you're in your sixties" and suggested she should be "put out to pasture".

An edition of Piers Morgan Uncensored featuring an interview with Prime Minister Rishi Sunak, which aired on 5 February 2024, attracted criticism after Sunak accepted a £1,000 bet from Morgan over the possible outcome of the UK government's Rwanda asylum plan.

In October 2024, Piers Morgan Uncensored received backlash after airing claims, which were subsequently shown to be false, made by Jaguar Wright about Jay-Z and Beyoncé on his show, after he asked her about Sean Combs's arrest. The incident sparked significant media attention and led to a viral apology by Morgan, as well as to discussions about the responsibilities of talk-show hosts in verifying guests' statements.

In May 2025, during an episode featuring Pakistan’s former foreign minister Hina Rabbani Khar, Pakistani podcaster Shehzad Ghias Shaikh, Indian journalist Barkha Dutt, and Indian influencer Ranveer Allahbadia (aka BeerBiceps), the show faced criticism from Pakistani media for poor moderation, nationalist bias, and devolving into theatrics. Furthermore, Morgan, who labeled the Pakistan ISI as the worst intelligence agency, was criticised for failing to challenge "inflammatory" claims made by Dutt and Allahbadia, when the latter displayed the photo of Osama bin Laden and stated how Pakistan were hiding him after he was killed by US Navy SEAL Team.

In December 2025, an interview with far-right political commentator Nick Fuentes sparked controversy and media scrutiny. During the segment, Piers questioned Fuentes on his antisemitic views, the Holocaust, and his opinions on Adolf Hitler. The interview generated attention when Fuentes remarked that Hitler was "fucking cool," leading to an immediate and strong rebuke from Morgan. Beyond the political and historical controversy, a separate moment from the interview, where Fuentes—who identifies as a "virgin"—was pressed by Morgan about his personal life, also went viral. The broadcast drew sharp debate regarding the ethics of providing a platform to Fuentes, despite the resulting high-engagement and provocative content.

== Awards ==
Piers Morgan Uncensored won the 2022 Sports Journalists' Association Scoop of the Year award and the TRIC award for an episode that aired on 16–17 November 2022 with Morgan interviewing Portuguese association footballer Cristiano Ronaldo, who at the time played for Manchester United F.C.

During the interview, Ronaldo was critical of the club, felt that he was betrayed, had no respect for the manager Erik ten Hag, and accused it of showing a lack of empathy when his young son died. Manchester United said it had "noted the media coverage" and will consider its response after the full facts have been established. Following the interview, which aired in two parts on 16 and 17 November, United began seeking "appropriate steps", a legal action over whether Ronaldo had breached his contract. It was subsequently announced on 22 November that Ronaldo had left the club following the interview.

In May 2023 the programme was also shortlisted for the 2023 National Television Awards in the TV interview category.
