= The Israel Coalition for Trauma =

Non-profit organization

The Israeli Coalition for Trauma (ITC) is the national coordinating body for trauma care and emergency preparedness in Israel. It has developed a multi-tiered model which integrates multiple types of organizations-ministries, non-profits, and local municipalities- to build resilience and provide continuous trauma care. ITC equips individuals, communities, and professionals with the tools and knowledge needed to cope before, during, and after emergencies. It is grounded in the understanding that effective emergency preparedness and response strengthens the capacity for recovery among individuals, communities, and society in Israel and around the world.

The coalition brings together 58 organizations, associations, and government ministries that deal with the prevention and handling of emergencies, the treatment of mental trauma and post-trauma, and the development of mental resilience among the population in Israel. The organization's CEO is Talia Levanon. The organization's headquarters are located in the Neve Ilan Media Center.

The ITC also collaborates with organizations around the world and has sent teams to provide assistance in trauma situations in Ukraine, Japan, France and other countries.

== History ==
The coalition was established in February 2001 by the UJA-Jewish Federation of New York, Eran, Selah - Center for Assistance to Immigrants in Crisis (AR), Amcha, Hadassah, and Mahut Israel.

In June 2019, the coalition received special consultative status with the United Nations Economic and Social Council. This is the highest status a non-profit can achieve on the global stage.

== Activity ==
The coalition provides a collaborative and holistic approach, combining the expertise acquired over the years with the accumulated knowledge and experience of leading organizations and government ministries specializing in dealing with crisis.

The coalition develops and implements, together with partners from Israel and abroad, emergency and post-emergency care programs, training professionals and volunteers from various fields and volunteers - in emergency preparedness, emergency work and post-emergency rehabilitation. The coalition provides services in the field of trauma: direct responses in the areas of community resilience for vulnerable populations (accessible psychosocial services during an emergency event at a personal, family and community level, support during the period following the event, and providing information and education to the public on how to deal with trauma), prepares for emergency events (workshops, lessons, and practice dealing with emergencies and trauma in schools, senior centers, and other community institutions), and conducts training and instruction for intervention teams in the field.

The coalition operates in more than 120 local authorities.

- In 2007, the Israeli Trauma Coalition, led by the Ministry of Health and in partnership with government ministries, established the five Resilience Centers in the area of the Gaza envelope - Eshkol, Sderot, Ashkelon, Shaar Hanegev, and Sdot Negev.
- In 2014, the Israeli Coalition for Trauma established the Bedouin Society Resilience Center in a joint venture with the Ministry of Agriculture.
- In 2017, 4 resilience centers were established in the West Bank - Shomron, Judea, Binyamin and Gush Etzion.
- In 2020 The Ashkelon Resilience Center was established
- In 2022 the AMAN Resilience Center, servicing the towns of Ofakim, Merhavim, Netivot, was established and approved by the government
- The National Resilience Center was established in 2023 following the beginning of Iron Swords War
- The Arab Resilience Center in Wadi Ara was established in 2024

== International activity ==
The coalition collaborates with international organizations involved in the field of aid and trauma, including UN organizations. During the years of the coalition's activity, its organizations have provided assistance in a number of emergency events around the world, including the terrorist events in Chechnya and Beslan, natural disasters in Sri Lanka, the Mississippi River, Houston, and Haiti, and the terrorist attacks at Hyper Cacher in Toulouse (2015), Nepal earthquake (2015),and Boston Marathon bombing (2013), the tsunami in Japan (2011), and Typhoon Haiyan (Yolanda) in the Philippines(2013).

For example, immediately after the tsunami in Japan, Israel trauma experts provided training to handle post-traumatic stress disorder and organized various kinds of therapy sessions including art, music, movement and drama for residents. Longer term programs included training close to 1000 Japanese and self-care.

They also sent advisors to Parkland, Florida to assist counselors and family members after the shooting in the school (2018). Similarly experts were sent to Manchester, UK, after the bombing of the Ariana Grande concert (2017).

The ITC has also established resilience centers around the world in recent years. In May 2023 after the Russian invasion of February 2022, it opened a center in Ukraine with the support of the Ukrainian government and its program How are you? It has also provided training to the Future for Ukraine Charity Foundation through its GIDNA project of psychological assistance for women who have suffered sexual violence by the Russian Military.

The coalition works in cooperation with the European Union, the Council of Europe and other organizations.

== Flood of residents seeking counseling after October 7 ==
In the aftermath of the Hamas attack in Southern Israel, on October 7, 2023, in which hundreds of people were kidnapped, men, women and children were raped and killed, and several thousand were wounded, the Resilience Centers have been inundated with requests for support. These include released hostages, the extended families and friends of the captives, bereaved families of those killed, eyewitnesses who observed atrocities, and individuals suffering from anxiety.

In addition the missile and rocket attacks by Hezbollah on Northern Israel and by Iran in June 2025 and March 2026 increased the levels of injury and anxiety among large numbers of children and adults. The ITC is working in coordination with the Ministry of Health and the National Insurance Institute to provide therapy for people throughout the country and set up sixteen trauma centers to strengthen resilience.
