= Olena Zelenska Foundation =

Ukrainian charitable foundation founded by Olena Zelenska

- Фундація Олени Зеленської
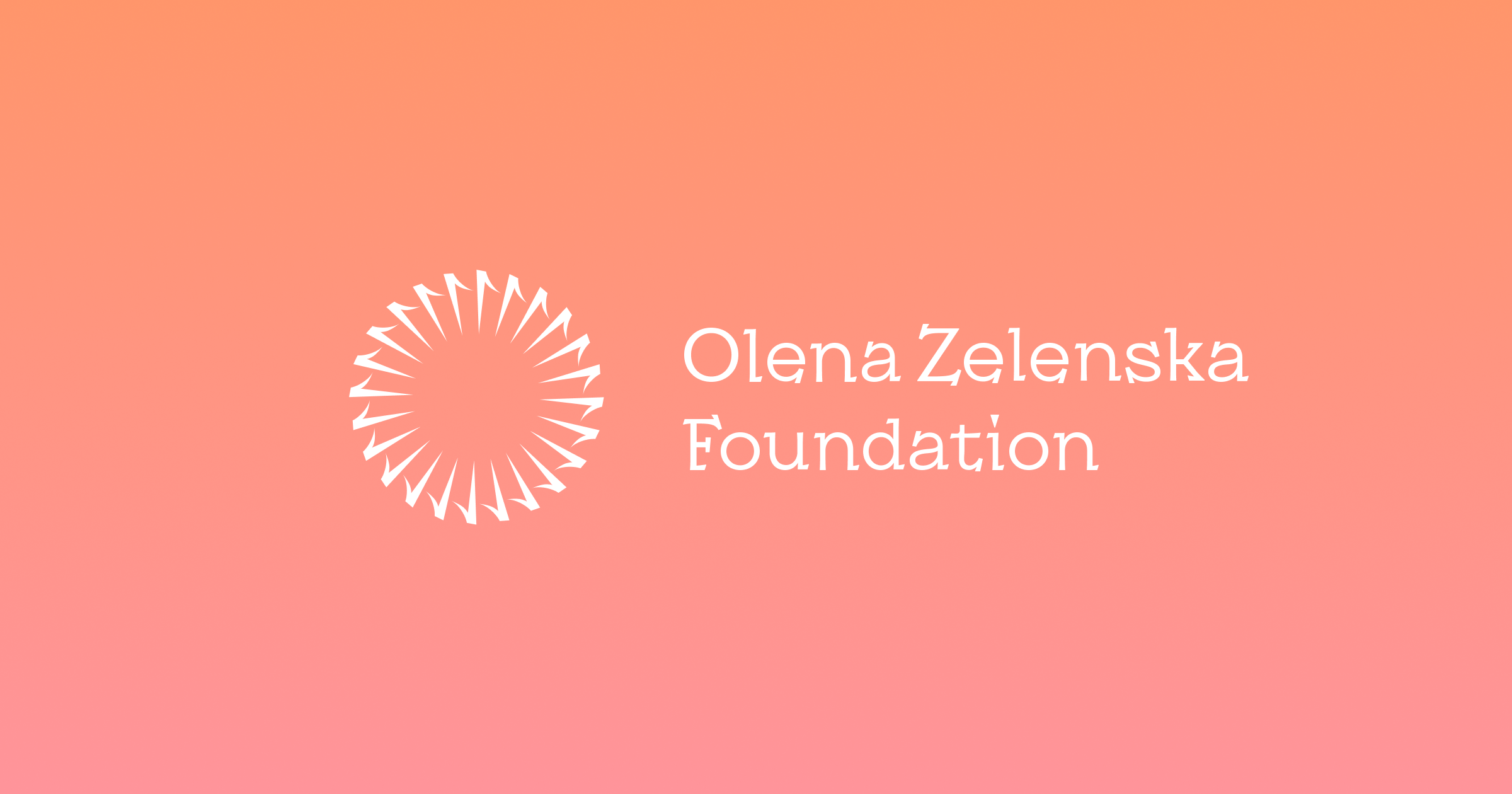
- Olena Zelenska Foundation logo

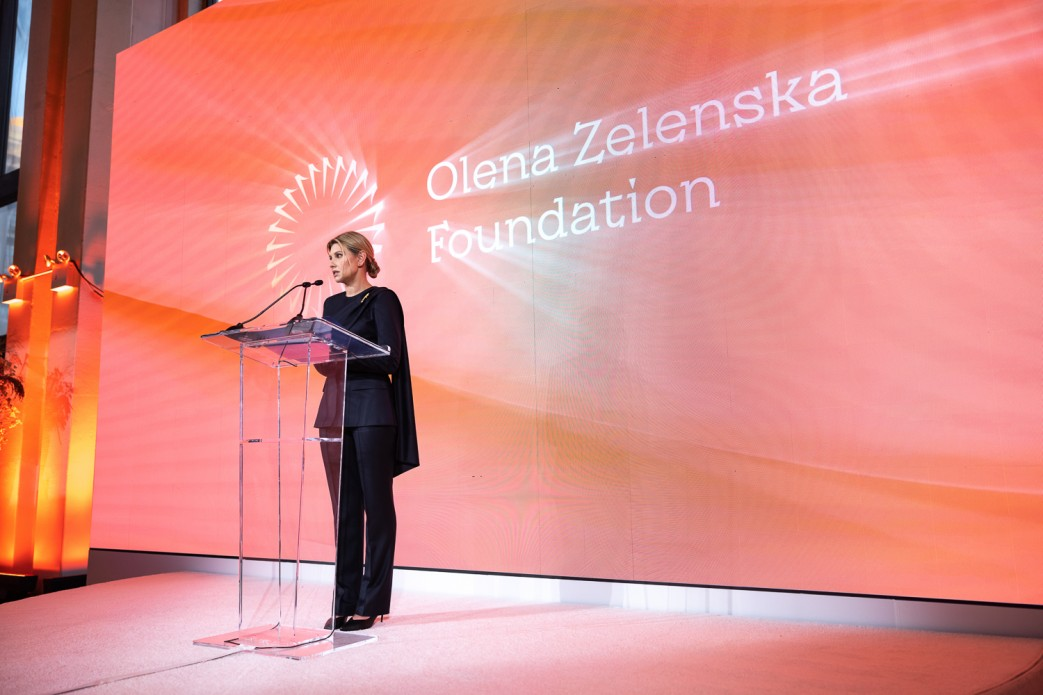
- Formation: September 22, 2022; 3 years ago
- Founder: Olena Zelenska
- Type: Non-governmental organization
- Location: Kyiv, Ukraine
- Website: https://zelenskafoundation.org/en

Olena Zelenska Foundation (Ukrainian: Фундація Олени Зеленської, romanized: Fundatsiia Oleny Zelenskoi) is a Ukrainian charitable foundation founded by the First Lady of Ukraine Olena Zelenska and presented on September 22, 2022, in New York City.

== History ==
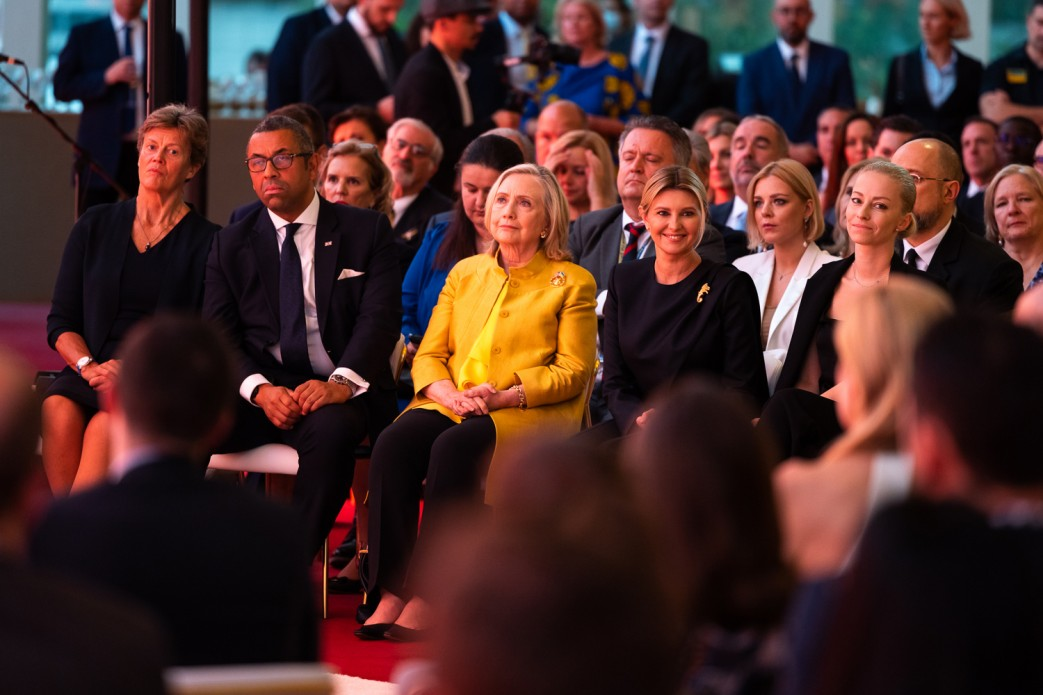
Olena Zelenska during the presentation of the Olena Zelenska Foundation

The presentation of the Olena Zelenska Foundation took place on September 22, 2022, at a charity evening in New York. The event was attended by former US Secretary of State Hillary Clinton, British Foreign Minister James Cleverly, General Director of the Metropolitan Opera in New York Peter Gelb, American TV presenter and actor Jimmy Fallon, actor Matt Damon, actress Brooke Shields, as well as diplomats and businessmen. Ukrainian pop stars Tina Karol and Julia Sanina performed at the charity evening. Andriy Bednyakov became the host of the evening. The president of Ukraine Volodymyr Zelenskyy joined the charity evening in an online format from Kyiv.

== Description ==
The main goal of the Olena Zelenska Foundation is the restoration of the human capital of Ukraine, as well as the reconstruction of medical and educational institutions. The areas of work are medicine, education and humanitarian aid. The foundation cooperates with foreign and Ukrainian businesses, international agencies and other funds that want to invest in the restoration of Ukraine's human capital.

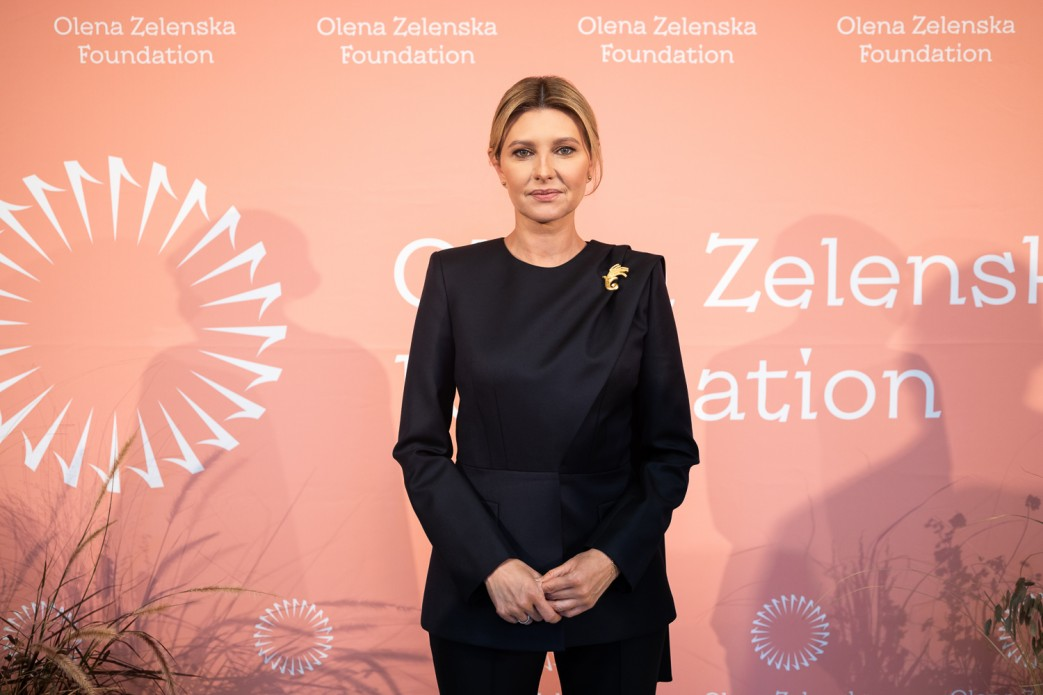
Zelenska during the presentation of the foundation

Since the beginning of the full-scale invasion, we have managed to do a lot. We have organised 20 convoys of life, which made it possible to evacuate more than 550 children with cancer to hospitals in Europe, the United States and Canada. We hosted the First Ladies and Gentlemen Summit to raise money and purchase more than 80 ambulances. We evacuated children from orphanages for their temporary stay abroad. We provided humanitarian aid to family-type orphanages. But every day brings more and more requests and needs. More funding is needed. That is why I am creating the Foundation. The Foundation will make it possible to significantly scale assistance to people and provide proper treatment and decent education to everyone who needs it,

— Olena Zelenska

== See also ==
- United24
- Kyiv Summit of First Ladies and Gentlemen
- Be Brave Like Ukraine
