= BetterMe =

Health and wellness app company

- Type: Privately held company
- Industry: Software, health & fitness
- Founded: 2017
- Founder: Victoria Repa
- Headquarters: Paphos, Cyprus
- Products: Apps, sportswear, athleisure
- Number of employees: 800
- Website: betterme.world

BetterMe is a company founded in 2017 in Kyiv, Ukraine. The company created two apps, BetterMe: Health Coaching and BetterMe: Mental Health.

Following the Russian invasion of Ukraine, BetterMe began offering various services freely to Ukrainians and collaborated with the Ukrainian government and other companies to set up various initiatives to help victims of the conflict.

== History and app features ==
The company was founded by Victoria Repa in 2017 in Kyiv. The company's first product was the BetterMe: Weight Loss Workouts app, which was later renamed to BetterMe: Health Coaching.

By 2018 the app was renamed simply to BetterMe, offering personalised fitness and diet courses to users. User numbers grew quickly, reaching 10 million downloads within its first year. The app has since become known as "BetterMe: Health Coaching". The app contains access to "over 4000 workouts", optional 1-on-1 coaching, daily personalised meal plans and progress tracking through a subscription-based model. The app also offers specialised workouts for pregnant women, older adults, and people with disabilities alongside specialised diets for those with conditions such as diabetes.

In 2018, the BetterMe: Meditation & Sleep app was released, the name of which was later changed to BetterMe: Mental Health. The app contains a personalised daily self-help plan, breathing exercises, courses for meditation, a sleep section (including courses and sleep stories) and ambient sounds for "better focus, sleep, or relaxation."

In 2025, BetterMe partnered with Paddle WA, the Western Australian affiliate of Paddle Australia, on its Pause for Life programme, which received the Sports Initiative of the Year award at the SportWest WA Sport Awards. The same year, the company received an Anthem Award in the health category, a Lovie Award, and was a finalist at the Reuters Events Global Sustainability Awards.

== Russian invasion of Ukraine ==
"Since the outbreak of the full-scale war, we have faced numerous trials, and the pandemic, against this backdrop, feels like mere preparation for today's harsh reality. However, we have had to transform ourselves within this new reality to become more socially responsible and empathetic.

Thus, to support the physical and mental health of Ukrainians, we provide free access to BetterMe: Health Coaching and BetterMe: Mental Health. Additionally, in an effort to assist Ukrainians in dealing with stress, BetterMe has collaborated with WHO in Ukraine, the First Lady of Ukraine, and the NGO "Barrier Free" to develop a digital self-help tool called "Doing What Matters in Times of Stress." Since February 24, 2022, BetterMe's Mental Health app has assisted over 350,000 Ukrainians in addressing the psychological consequences of war. Furthermore, we have launched two charity collections of activewear."

In March 2022, BetterMe, together with UNICEF Ukraine added a section for psychological assistance to children during the war within the BetterMe: Mental Health app. In addition, the company began cooperating with the Ministry of Education and Science of Ukraine to conduct online exercise classes in schools.

In 2022, the company launched two charitable sportswear collections with 100% of the proceeds going to charitable initiatives, including prosthetics for soldiers, to the NGO "Zemliachky - Ukrainian Front" for sewing military uniforms for women in the Armed Forces of Ukraine. BetterMe also contributed $15,000 to United24 for the purchase of an ambulance.

In a 2023 interview with feastgood, Repa spoke about – among other things – the issues faced by the company due to the Russian invasion of Ukraine. She spoke on the various initiatives launched by the company in response to this, such as providing free access to both of their apps to Ukrainians. BetterMe also collaborated with the WHO in Ukraine, Olena Zelenska and the NGO "Barrier Free" (itself formed in response to the invasion, advocating for the creation of an equal access mental health program in Ukraine) to create a digital self help tool called "Doing What Matters in Times of Stress". The illustrated guide aims to provides self-help techniques in times of stress, "wherever they live and whatever their circumstances."

The company also had to make changes internally due to the invasion, such as helping to "relocate team members and their families to safer parts of the country" and "setting them up with remote workspaces" due to the unsafe nature of returning to office working.

In 2023, BetterMe collaborated with Esper Bionics and Future For Ukraine to develop "Limb Loss Workouts" for amputees. The aim of the system is to help amputees regain limb functionality and to prepare for the use of prosthetics, providing "200 targeted training workshops for upper and lower limb loss". That same year BetterMe, in collaboration with the Ministry of Economy of Ukraine and as part of the "How are you?" initiative formed by Olena Zelenska, launched the Program for Improving Productivity at Work.

In 2024 BetterMe collaborated with the Superhumans Center, a specialist clinic for the treatment and rehabilitation of amputees, to create a course called "Communication without Barriers". The course aimed to improve people's communication skills with amputees and to destigmatise them.

In May 2026, BetterMe launched the Adaptive Collection, an apparel line developed in collaboration with GAMUT Management and veterans for individuals with limb differences, prosthetic needs, and limited motor function. Proceeds from the collection are donated to the Future for Ukraine Charity Foundation, which supports complex prosthetic cases and rehabilitation.
