= How are you? =

Ukrainian program

- Native name: Ти як?
- Type: All-Ukrainian program
- Founder: Olena Zelenska, First Lady of Ukraine
- Area served: Ukraine
- Services: healthcare, mental health, services
- Website: https://howareu.com

The All-Ukrainian mental health program "How are you?" was an initiative aimed at building a quality system of providing services in the field of psychosocial support and developing a culture of mental health care. The initiative was launched by Olena Zelenska, the First Lady of Ukraine, in May 2022.

== Background ==
The onset of the Russo-Ukrainian War in February 2022 had a noticeable impact on the lives of Ukrainians, including their mental health. According to the Ministry of Health of Ukraine, about 15 million Ukrainians will experience the consequences of the war on their mental health. Worldwide, the British company Alligator Digital research states that every second person in the world experiences the impact of the war launched by Russia against Ukraine.

In the spring of 2022, in personal communication, Olena Zelenska offered the first ladies of the US, Poland, and Israel, the Queen of Belgium to support the mental health initiative in Ukraine.

The All-Ukrainian mental health program has been well received by experts from the World Health Organization, beginning under the name "How are you?" as a communication campaign in collaboration with USAID. It has also been supported by the United Nations Children's Fund (UNICEF), the International Organization for Migration, UNESCO in Ukraine, the United Nations Population Fund, etc.

In May 2022, Olena Zelenska, the First Lady of Ukraine, spoke at the 75th session of the World Health Assembly, the supreme decision-making body of the WHO, announcing the mental health program.

The Government of Ukraine has also created an Interdepartmental Coordination Council (ICC) to moderate the program, co-chaired by Iryna Vereshchuk, Deputy Prime Minister of Ukraine - Minister for Reintegration of Temporarily Occupied Territories, and Viktor Lyashko, Minister of Health of Ukraine. As part of the program, a resource audit of the current state of mental health services within the healthcare system was conducted during the ICC meeting. It included presentations on the relevant international experience and an audit of the people's expectations. The identified gaps became the basis for the prioritized projects of the respective ministries to progress in the mental health program.

In December 2022, the initiative, formerly known as the National Program of Mental Health and Psychosocial Support, was renamed the All-Ukrainian Mental Health program "How are you?" on the initiative of Olena Zelenska.

== Structure ==
The program is implemented through a range of projects coordinated by the relevant ministries of Ukraine:

- The Ministry of Health of Ukraine is aiming to ensure that a person can receive mental health issues-related help from a family doctor, therapist, or pediatrician.
- The Ministry of Social Policy of Ukraine is implementing a comprehensive social service for mental sustainability.
- The Ministry of Education and Science of Ukraine is implementing psychological resilience education at all levels — from preschool to higher education.
- The Ministry of Internal Affairs of Ukraine is developing an algorithm for providing crisis psychological assistance in emergencies with subsequent support.
- The Ministry of Veterans Affairs of Ukraine is developing a digital solution to support veterans and their families in post-war adaptation.
- The Ministry of Defense of Ukraine is implementing a five-layer recovery system for veterans, also planning to establish Mental Health Recovery Centers to provide multidisciplinary teams’ assistance.
- The Ministry of Economy of Ukraine, together with the State Employment Service, is implementing a psychosocial support project for Ukrainians in the workplace.
- The Ministry of Youth and Sports of Ukraine is expanding the "Active Parks" networks and training the coordinators who work at these locations on psychological self-help.
- The Ministry of Culture and Information Policy of Ukraine is implementing a program for the specialists of art education institutions (teachers at universities, colleges, and art academies) to acquire psychological self-help skills.

The program is coordinated by the Coordination Center for Mental Health (CCMH) of the Cabinet of Ministers of Ukraine, established in March 2023, and is supported by the World Health Organization (WHO). The CCMH carries out strategic and operational coordination within the region; ensures intersectoral cooperation with state and municipal institutions, non-governmental organizations, scientific institutions, international partners, and humanitarian missions; and implements educational work aimed at psychoeducation and anti-stigma efforts.

Deputy heads of regional military civil administrations and regional coordinators implement the All-Ukrainian mental health program at a regional level.

Among the program's ambassadors are representatives from the entertainment and business industries, including other public opinion makers.

== Activity ==
As part of the All-Ukrainian mental health program, representatives of the "first line of contact" (social workers, medical workers, educators, rescue workers, the police, the non-governmental sector, businesses that create goods and services for the population) are trained in self-help skills, and psychological first aid. Since the start of the initiative, more than 400,000 listeners throughout Ukraine have acquired relevant knowledge over the year during the training held in cooperation with the WHO, Israel Trauma Coalition, IsraAID, Polish specialists, the International Organization for Migration, the independent international medical humanitarian organization Doctors Without Borders, etc..

A separate project, which is implemented jointly with the United Nations Children's Fund (UNICEF), is dedicated to the mental health of children, adolescents, and parents.

Tips on self and child help as well as verified partners’ mental help hotline contacts are available on the website.

== Collaborations ==
=== 2022 ===
In October 2022, a Ukrainian specialists delegation, assisted by Her Royal Highness Queen Mathilde of the Belgians, studied the national mental health care system. Later that month, the Ukrainian company BetterMe and WHO within the Program created a training course to help Ukrainians fight stress. The program called "Important Skills in Times of Stress" contains interactive tests, exercises, and visualizations. In 2022, Ukrainian specialists collaborated with the WHO to produce videos on overcoming stress called "Basic Skills for Caring for Yourself and Others".

=== 2023 ===
During the March 2023 Stockholm visit, Ukrainian specialists studied the Swedish approaches. Final assessments also included American experience in the field. The communication campaign "How are you?", assisted by USAID, aims to form a mental health care culture in Ukraine. The campaign disseminates information about mental health as an integral part of physical health, and about self-help techniques. In November of the same year, with the support of the "Lisova Polyana" Mental Health and Rehabilitation Center of the Ministry of Health of Ukraine, in cooperation with the WHO, videos were created with Ukrainian stars and TV presenters demonstrating various self-help techniques. On 6 September 2023, the Third Summit of First Ladies and Gentlemen "Mental Health: Resilience and Fragility of the Future" was held in Kyiv. In September 2023, Ukrainian schools opened a new academic year, devoting the first lesson to the mental health topic. On 10 October 2023, for Mental Health Day, with the assistance of regional coordinators, so-called "Mental Health Trails" were organized in Ukrainian cities and communities for people to "measure" their own psycho-emotional state and learn self-help techniques. The first lady and the initiative ambassadors then read the poem "How are you?" written by Ukrainian singer Dmytro Monatyk.
