= Future for Ukraine Charity Foundation =

Charity foundation established in Warsaw

- Formation: 2022; 4 years ago Warsaw, Kyiv, Washington
- Type: International NGO
- Purpose: Help for displaced, charity for refugees
- Headquarters: Warsaw, Poland
- Region served: Ukraine
- Leader: Olena Nikolaenko, Hanna Kovalova, Natalia Arzamastseva
- Website: ffu.foundation

Future for Ukraine Charity Foundation is a charity established in the early spring 2022 in Warsaw, with offices in Kyiv and Washington.The FFU Foundation has received the official status of a 501c3 organization and an EIN in the state of Maryland, USA. The funds work on the principle of crowdfunding and raise funds for charitable assistance in four areas: medicine, psychological help for women, assistance to children, and humanitarian aid.

Future for Ukraine Charitable Foundation (FFU Ukraine) and Future for Ukraine Foundation (FFU Poland) are two legal entities that work together based on a memorandum of cooperation.

The purpose of the funds is to consolidate efforts to help the Ukrainian people and Ukraine, to promote the restoration of rights and freedoms, and the rehabilitation of Ukrainian citizens, as well as their family members affected by the war on the territory of Ukraine. Funds also aim to implement the actions aimed at the further reconstruction of Ukraine and creating a happy and safe future for Ukraine and its citizens, as well as to develop and support these areas in the public interest.

Both teams of FFU Ukraine, FFU Poland and FFU USA create joint projects and collect funds to help Ukrainians.

== History ==
FFU Ukraine and FFU Poland arose in early spring 2022, as a result of the initiative of several Ukrainian women who, being in the difficult conditions of a full-scale invasion, were forced to leave their motherland and emigrate abroad to maintain their safety. Having rallied together, they decided to create organizations aimed at assisting Ukrainians in overcoming the negative impact of the war situation, and restoring stability in the lives of the victims.

== Founders ==
Hanna Kovalova, Co-founder and president of Future for Ukraine

Olena Nikolaienko, President of the FFU in the United States and volunteer curator of strategy and development for the FFU International

Natalia Arzamastseva, Chairman of the Board, FFU Poland

== Medical direction ==
As of April 2023, they managed to provide charitable assistance to 8 Ukrainian military personnel with amputations by paying for prosthetics and rehabilitation in Washington (US) and Malta. In addition, 220 metal osteosynthesis operations were performed with the funds collected by FFU Ukraine.

The story of the military (former choreographer) Oleksandr Chaika gained attention in mass media. He was the first participant in the FFU Ukraine “Prosthetics of the Ukrainian military 2023” program.

The Foundation provided prosthetics and professional rehabilitation of 72 Ukrainian servicemen at a total cost of over $2,000,000. 211 Ukrainian soldiers and civilians with complex fractures were fitted with the metal osteosynthesis system — joining bones with titanium plates. During the fund's operation, 20 hospitals and medical rescue services received humanitarian aid of more than $1 million.

== Humanitarian aid ==
From the first months of the war, the team of FFU Ukraine began its journey of humanitarian missions to regions that needed help, delivering food, hygiene products, household chemicals, medicines, seedlings, animal feed, etc. to locals residents. Since the FFU Ukraine founding, its volunteers have visited Kharkiv, Donetsk region, Mykolaiv, Kyiv, Ternopil, and Kherson regions. To support humanitarian missions, FFU Ukraine engages citizens by announcing fundraisers on the website, as well as attracting donors and partners.

== Psychological help for women ==
Since the beginning of 2023, FFU Ukraine has launched GIDNA, which provides for the provision of a course of free psychological counseling for women who have experienced or witnessed violence at the hands of the Russian military. Consultations are provided by psychologists who have the appropriate specialization in working with the trauma of violence and have received training from the Israeli Trauma Coalition (ITS). This organization provides psychosocial support to the population during disasters.

Since the launch of the GIDNA project, the foundation has been supported by the media and opinion leaders, including Jamala, Alan Badoev, Dasha Astafieva, Nadia Dorofeeva, Olya Polyakova, and KAZKA. Also, to support and develop GIDNA, FFU Ukraine took part in the charity auction at the fair of creative people in New York "I am u are". At the event, the foundation presented the "Venus" lot — a vase in the form of the outlines of a female body created by the Ukrainian brand YAKUSH. In addition, they also collected funds for GIDNA at the Spilka Charity Market in Kyiv.

GIDNA is supported by The Israel Trauma Coalition.

== Help for children ==
On June 6, 2022, the Future For Ukraine Foundation opened Children Hub in Warsaw — a center for the adaptation, development, and psychological support for Ukrainian displaced children who moved to the Polish capital to escape the war. Children Hub provides consultations of psychologists, speech therapists, creative activities, entertainment, etc.

From the beginning of the hub's work until April 2023, 933 families applied to the Children Hub.

Also, in February 2023, the Future of Ukraine Foundation opened the LEVCHYK SPECTRUM HUB center in Lviv, which provides remedial classes for children with autism. The main goal is the development and socialization of displaced children with ASD, as well as their adaptation to the new realities of life during the war.

=== "Children. War. Future." charity expo ===
From July 9 to 17, 2022, the "Children. War. Future." exhibition from the FFU Foundation took place in Kyiv Metro, where 300 children's drawings created during the Russian invasion of Ukraine were presented.

Some of the drawings for the exhibition were provided by the project “Mother, I See the War”, which constitutes a collage of children's works for a charity NFT auction and digital museum. The rest of the artworks are drawn by orphaned children who lost their parents during Russia's war against Ukraine.

== Partners ==
According to the information on the FFU official website, they have secured the support of more than 40 Ukrainian and international partners from various fields for the first year of the fund’s operation. In particular, in the medical direction, FFU Ukraine cooperates with Rochester Regional Health, BROTHER'S BROTHER FOUNDATION, MCOP (Medical Center Orthotics & Prosthetics), Steward Health Care Malta, Israel Trauma Coalition (ITC), and other organizations.

In humanitarian missions, FFU Ukraine is supported by the "METRO Cash and Carry Ukraine", L'Oréal Ukraine, "Tvoia Opora" Charity Foundation, Public Movement "Vilni", Revival Charity Foundation, Good Bread Bakery, and others.

Pfizer allocated $1 million for the prosthetics of the Ukrainian veterans. Following the successful implementation of the grant assistance, the Pfizer Foundation allocated another $450,000 to the FFU Foundation for the Prosthetics of Ukrainian Defenders program.

The money has been granted for the Prosthetics program for Ukrainian veterans with complex cases of amputees, which is implemented by the Future for Ukraine(FFU) Charitable Foundation and supported by the leading prosthetic clinic Medical Center Orthotics & Prosthetics (MCOP).
