= Kyiv Summit of First Ladies and Gentlemen =

International initiative of the First Lady of Ukraine Olena Zelenska

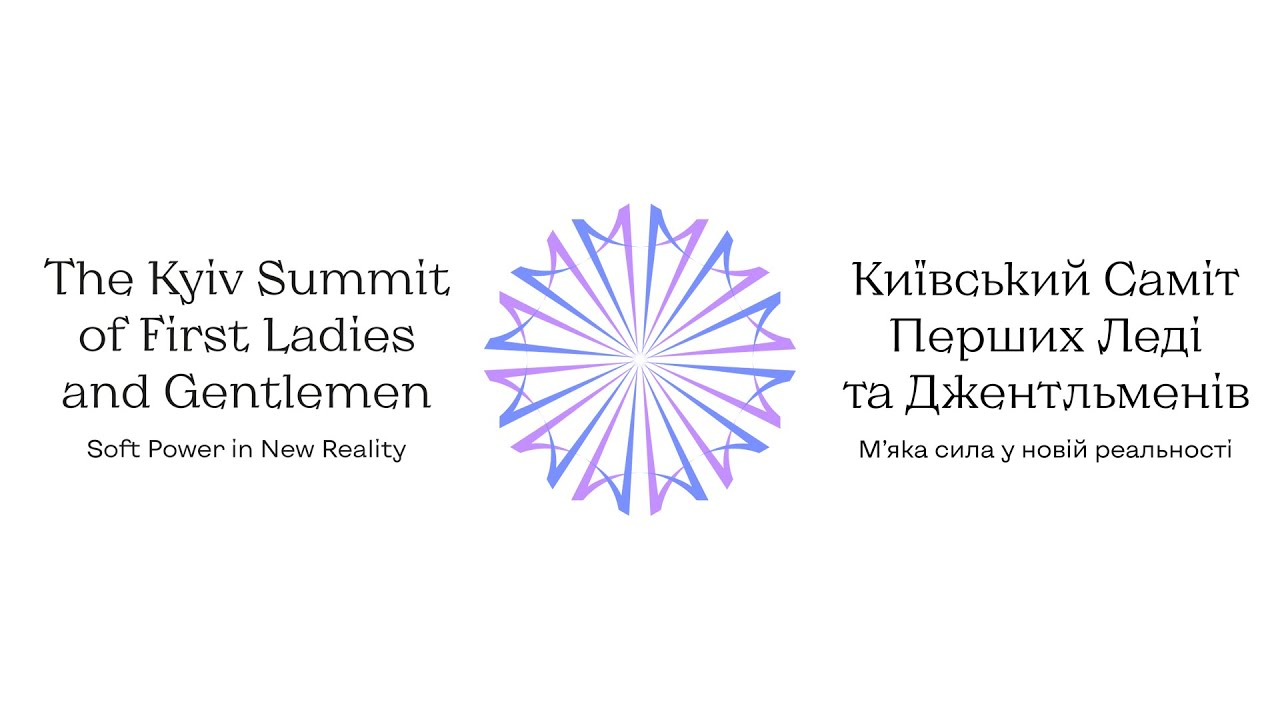

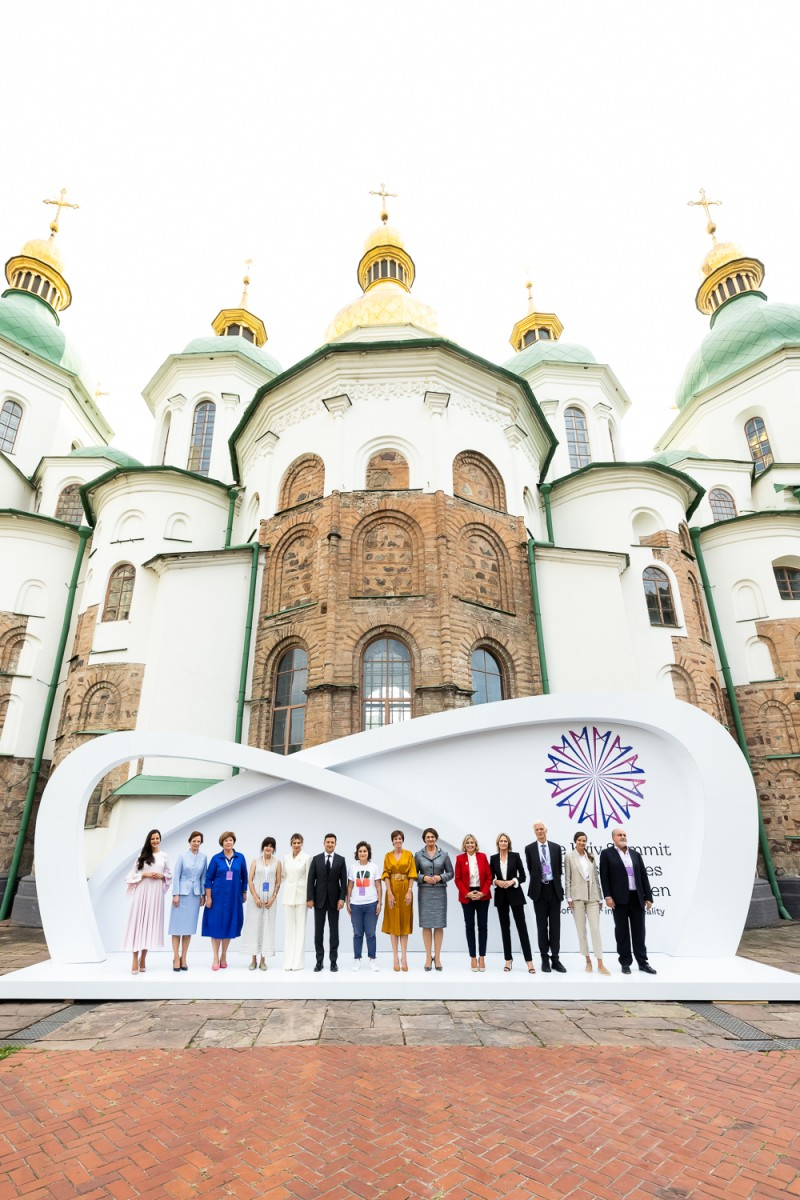
- Participants of the first Kyiv Summit of First Ladies and Gentlemen
- Host country: Ukraine
- Date: August 23, 2021
- Cities: Kyiv
- Venues: National Sanctuary "Sophia of Kyiv"
- Participants: First ladies and gentlemen: (Ukraine) Olena Zelenska (Latvia) Andra Levite (Lithuania) Diana Nausėdienė (Lebanon) Claudine Aoun (Serbia) Tamara Vučić (European Union) Amélie Derbaudrenghien (Israel) Michal Herzog (Germany) Elke Büdenbender (Turkey) Emine Erdoğan (Brazil) Michelle Bolsonaro (Costa Rica) Claudia Dobles Camargo (Croatia) Sanja Musić Milanović; Speakers and experts: (United States) Nassim Nicholas Taleb (Ethiopia) Tedros Adhanom (Germany) Andreas Schleicher (Sweden) Åsa Regnér (Ukraine) Kateryna Levchenko (Ukraine) Zoya Lytvyn (Ukraine) Yana Panfilova (Ukraine) Viktor Liashko (Afghanistan) Sahraa Karimi; Greeting address: (United States) Hillary Clinton; Special guests: (United States) Robin Wright (Canada) Katheryn Winnick; Moderator of the summit: (Ukraine) Maria Efrosinina
- Website: summitflg.org/en/ youtube.com/@summit_flg

Kyiv Summit of First Ladies and Gentlemen (Ukrainian: Київський саміт перших леді та джентльменів) is an international initiative of the First Lady of Ukraine Olena Zelenska. The theme of the first summit was Soft power in the new reality. The aim of the event is to create an international dialogue platform that will help solve humanitarian problems around the world. The first summit took place on August 23, 2021 in the territory of the National Sanctuary "Sophia of Kyiv".

== History ==
=== Annual summits ===
#	Date	Theme	Host	Note
1st	August 23, 2021	Soft power in new reality	Olena Zelenska	
2nd (Note: Second Summit of First Ladies and Gentlemen)	July 23, 2022	Ukraine and the World: The Future We (Re)build Together	Olena Zelenska	
3rd (Note: Third Summit of First Ladies and Gentlemen)	September 6, 2023	Mental Health: Resilience and Vulnerability of the Future	Olena Zelenska	
4th (Note: Fourth Summit of First Ladies and Gentlemen)	September 12, 2024	Protecting Childhood: ensuring a safe future	Olena Zelenska	
5th (Note: Fifth Summit of First Ladies and Gentlemen)	September 11, 2025	Education Shaping the World	Olena Zelenska	

== Message ==
In her address, the founder of the Kyiv Summit of First Ladies and Gentlemen, Olena Zelenska, noted: "The 'soft power' of the First Ladies, who have no actual political power, is capable of changing the surrounding reality. The spouses of Heads of State achieve the set goal and get the expected result not by engaging in politics, but through humanitarian projects and social connections. In the new reality, it is soft power with firm decisions that can help the world."

== Summit’s goal ==
- to bring together First Ladies and Gentlemen to create an international platform to exchange experiences and implement joint projects for the well-being of people in the world,
- to discuss current issues of the day and the activities of First Ladies and Gentlemen to address them,
- make the voice of each individual First Lady and Gentleman more influential.

== Members ==
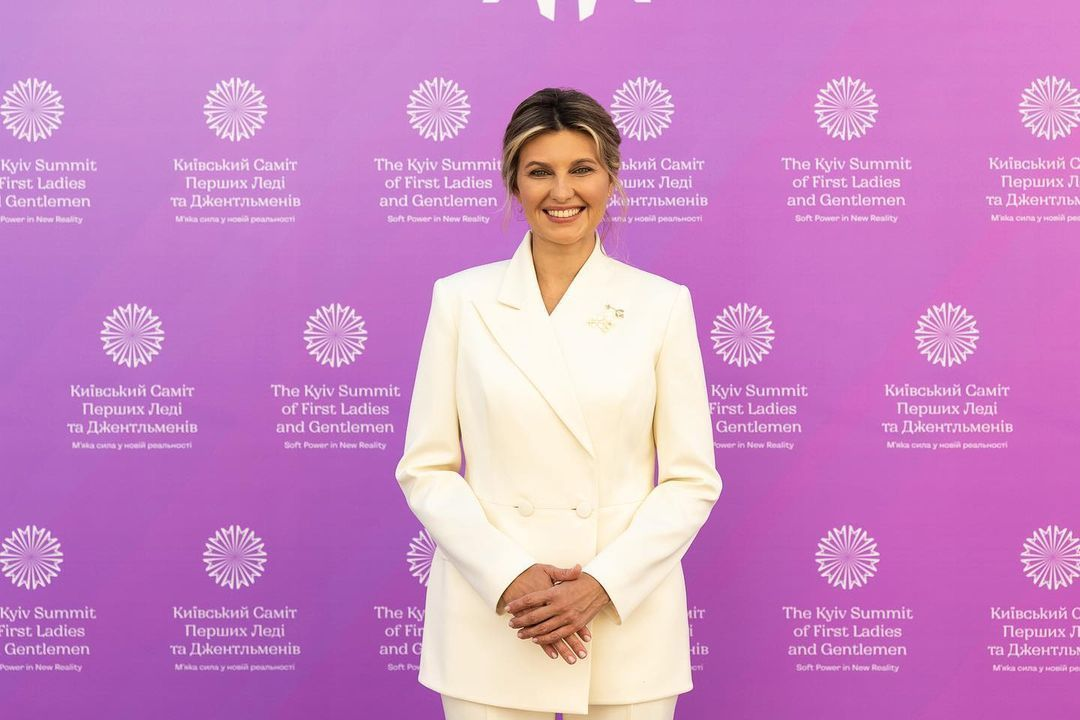
Olena Zelenska at the Kyiv Summit of First Ladies and Gentlemen.

The Kyiv Summit of First Ladies and Gentlemen was attended by ten first ladies, including the wives of the heads of Latvia, Lithuania, Serbia, Israel, Germany, Turkey, Croatia, Costa Rica, Brazil, the European Council, the daughter of the President of Lebanon, and the First Lady of Ukraine Olena Zelenska.

Hillary Clinton, who had been the First Lady of the United States (1993–2001) and Secretary of State (2009–2013), congratulated the Kyiv Summit of First Ladies and Gentlemen in a video address:

"We, first ladies and gentlemen, have a unique position that is sometimes accompanied by unmatched challenges. We live under a magnifying glass and our life is subject to great scrutiny. This is not easy, as I know from personal experience. At the same time, we have an unprecedented opportunity to serve our country, use resources and relationships to undertake important projects, and contribute to the [preservation of] health and well-being of our society."

In total, the summit was attended by more than 20 participants, including the leadership of the World Health Organization, UN Women, as well as leading experts and world opinion leaders: among them the thinker, author of the book The Black Swan: The Impact of the Highly Improbable Nassim Nicholas Taleb and Afghan film director Sahraa Karimi, which the Ukrainian state evacuated with its family from Afghanistan after dramatic events. The summit was also attended by American actress Robin Wright and Canadian actress of Ukrainian descent Katheryn Winnick.

== Declaration ==
Following the event, the participants of the first summit approved the final joint declaration. The document states:

- to establish a format of international cooperation, the Summit of the First Ladies and Gentlemen, towards exchange of experiences, coordination of efforts and consolidated implementation of joint projects with a view to overcoming the consequences of the COVID-19 pandemic and achieving the Sustainable Development Goals in various spheres of life of societies and the international community,
- to invite all the interested First Ladies and Gentlemen of the world to join in the efforts to achieve these objectives and to facilitate the adaptation of humanity to the new reality,
- to focus on the implementation of the projects in the following areas: healthcare; education; equal access to basic services and guarantees; eradication of poverty; assistance to people with disabilities; support of children; the right of security in the senior age; gender equality; and other areas which the First Ladies and Gentlemen will identify as priorities in the future,
- to contribute to the creation of an international expert network that will consist of leading experts in various fields, for information and analytical support of initiatives and projects in the aforementioned areas,
- to work in their countries towards strengthening the institution of the First Ladies and Gentlemen in order to create new opportunities for the use of "soft power" in the world.

Due to the escalating security situation in Afghanistan, the joint statement was made during the summit on the need to protect women, children and families in conflict situations.
