= Olena Zelenska =

First Lady of Ukraine since 2019

- Олена Зеленська
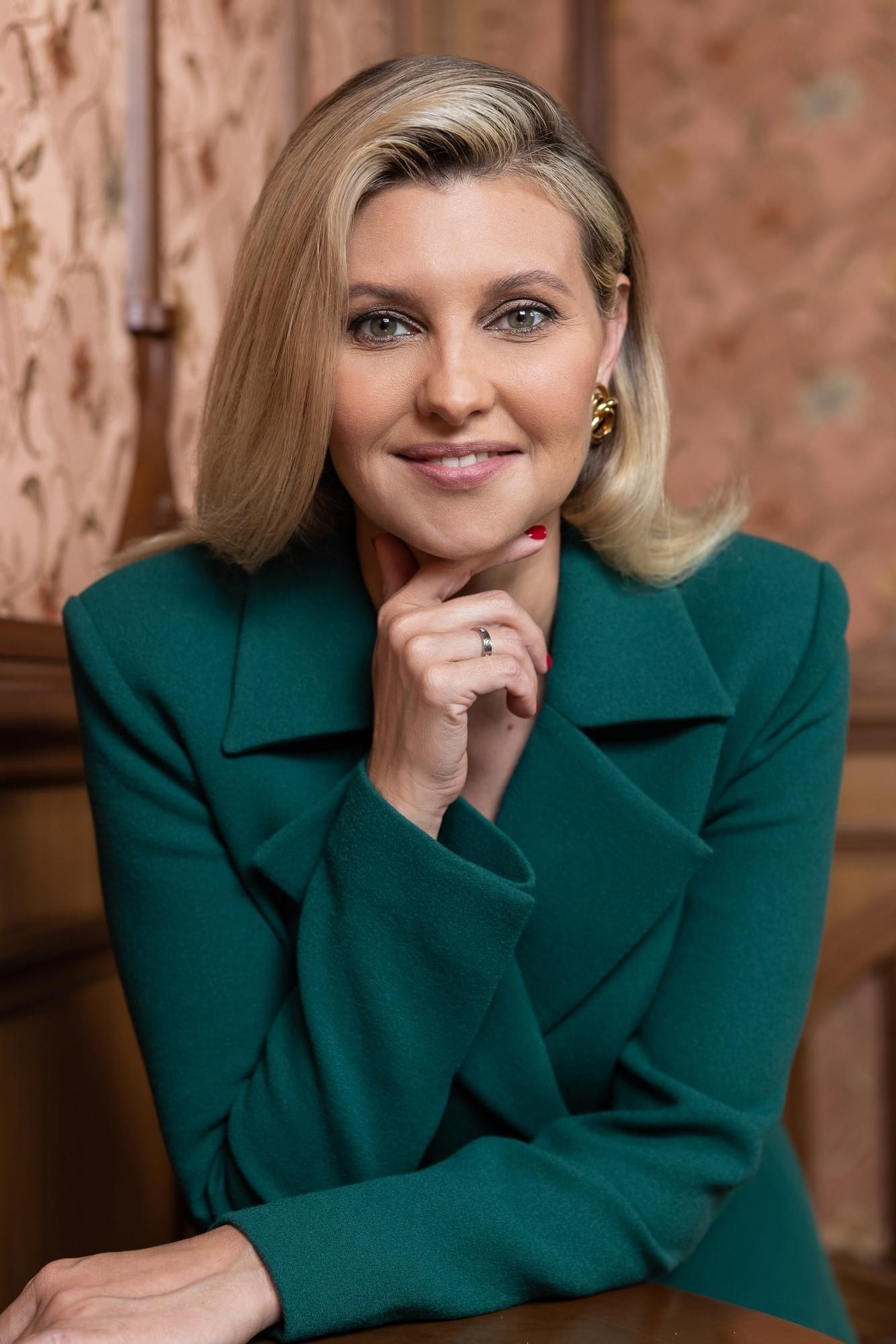
- Official portrait, 2021

First Lady of Ukraine
- Current
- Assumed role 20 May 2019
- President: Volodymyr Zelenskyy
- Preceded by: Maryna Poroshenko

Personal details
- Born: Olena Volodymyrivna Kyiashko; 6 February 1978 (age 48) Kryvyi Rih, Ukrainian SSR, Soviet Union
- Spouse: Volodymyr Zelenskyy (m. 2003)
- Children: 2
- Relatives: Oleksandr Zelenskyy (father-in-law)
- Education: Kryvyi Rih National University
- Occupation: Screenwriter
- Awards: BBC 100 Women (2022)

Olena Volodymyrivna Zelenska (Note: In this name that follows East Slavic naming customs, the patronymic is Volodymyrivna and the family name is Zelenska or Kyiashko.; Ukrainian: Олена Володимирівна Зеленська) (née Kyiashko; (Note: Ukrainian: Кіяшко) born 6 February 1978) is a Ukrainian screenwriter who has been First Lady of Ukraine since 2019, as the wife of President Volodymyr Zelenskyy. Zelenska was named by Time as one of the 100 Most Influential People of 2023.

== Early life and career ==
Olena Kyiashko was born on 6 February 1978 in Kryvyi Rih, Ukrainian SSR. She studied at Kryvyi Rih Gymnasium No. 95, where she met her future husband, Volodymyr Zelenskyy. In 2000, she graduated from Kryvyi Rih Technical University, majoring in Urban and Construction Management, receiving a specialist diploma. She also graduated from a music school with a piano class.

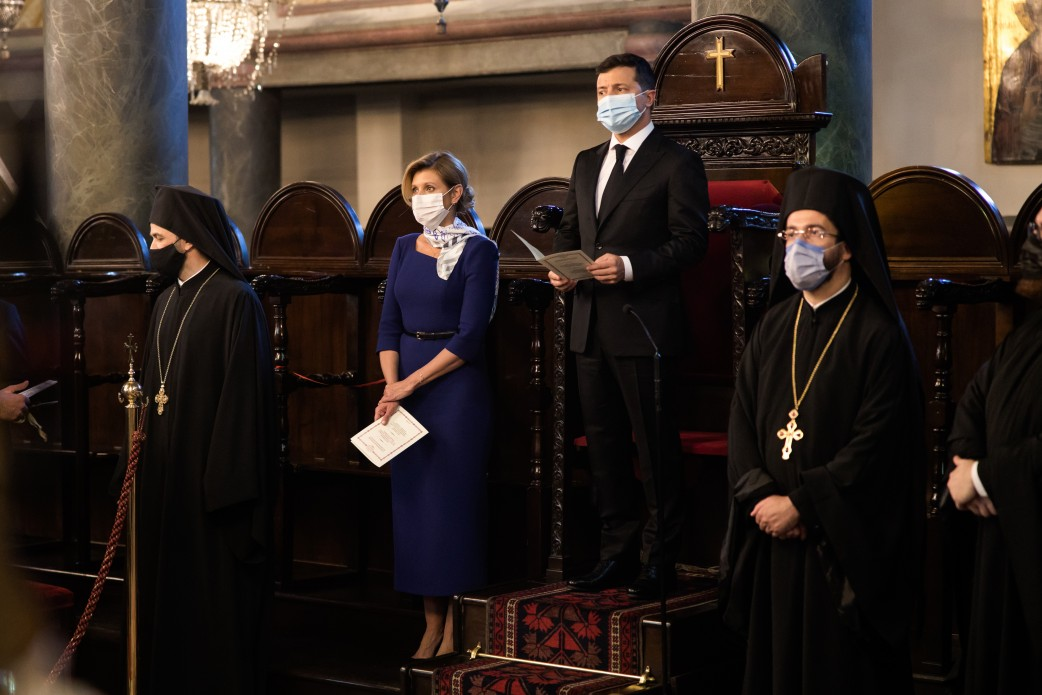
Volodymyr Zelenskyy and Olena Zelenska at an Eastern Orthodox prayer service in Istanbul on 16 October 2020

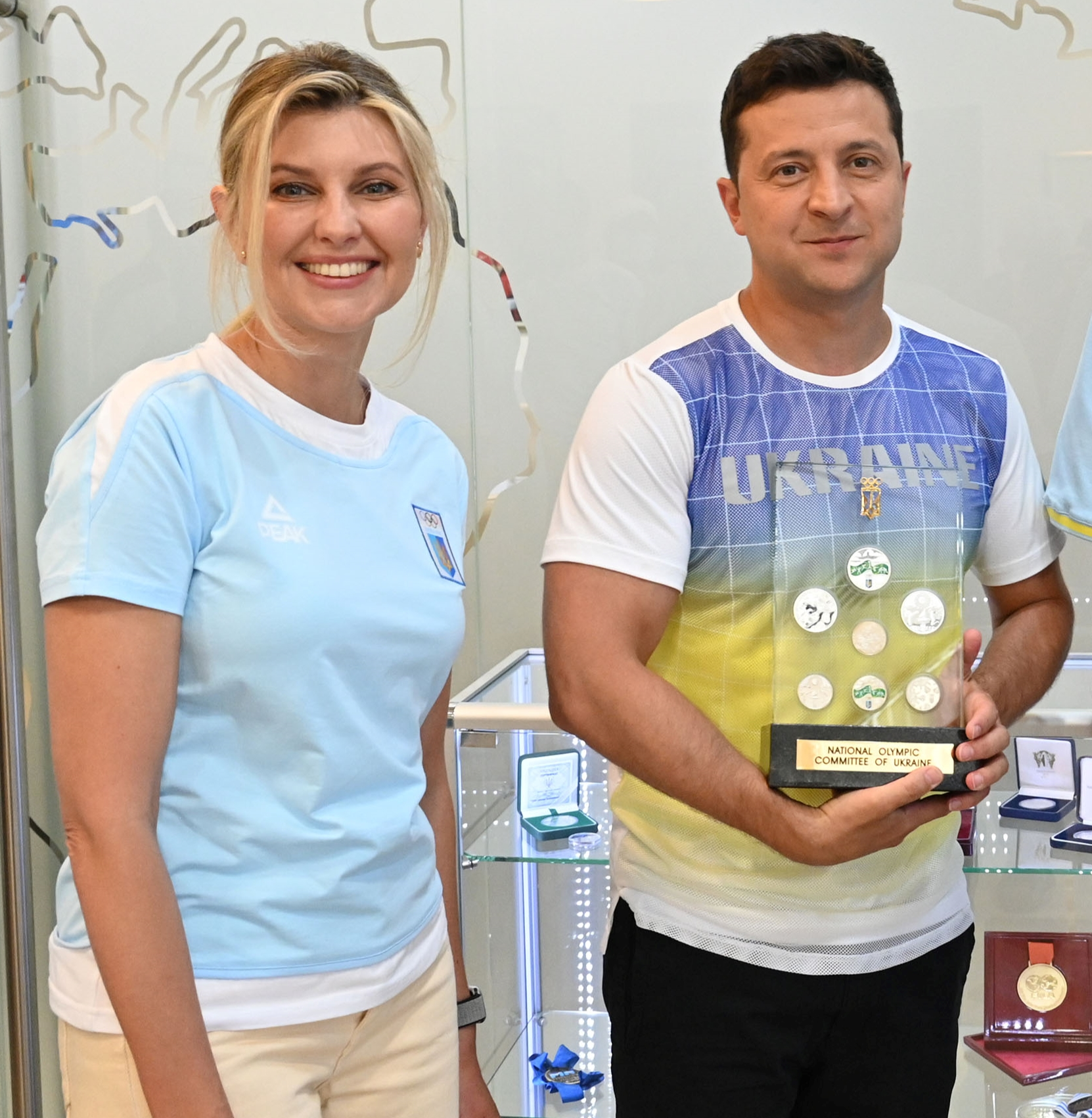
Olena Zelenska and Volodymyr Zelenskyy in 2021, visiting the Olympic House, the headquarters of the National Olympic Committee of Ukraine

In 2003, she and Zelenskyy married. Olena and Volodymyr Zelenskyy are the parents of two children: daughter Oleksandra (born on 15 July 2004) and son Kyrylo (born on 21 January 2013). The family has several pets: two dogs, a cat, a parrot, and a guinea pig. Zelenska enjoys sports, likes to read and is a fan of cinematography. The family lives in Kyiv.

=== Professional activity ===
Olena Zelenska has been a scriptwriter for Kvartal 95 since its foundation.

== First Lady of Ukraine (2019–present) ==
=== Social initiatives before the full-scale Russian invasion ===
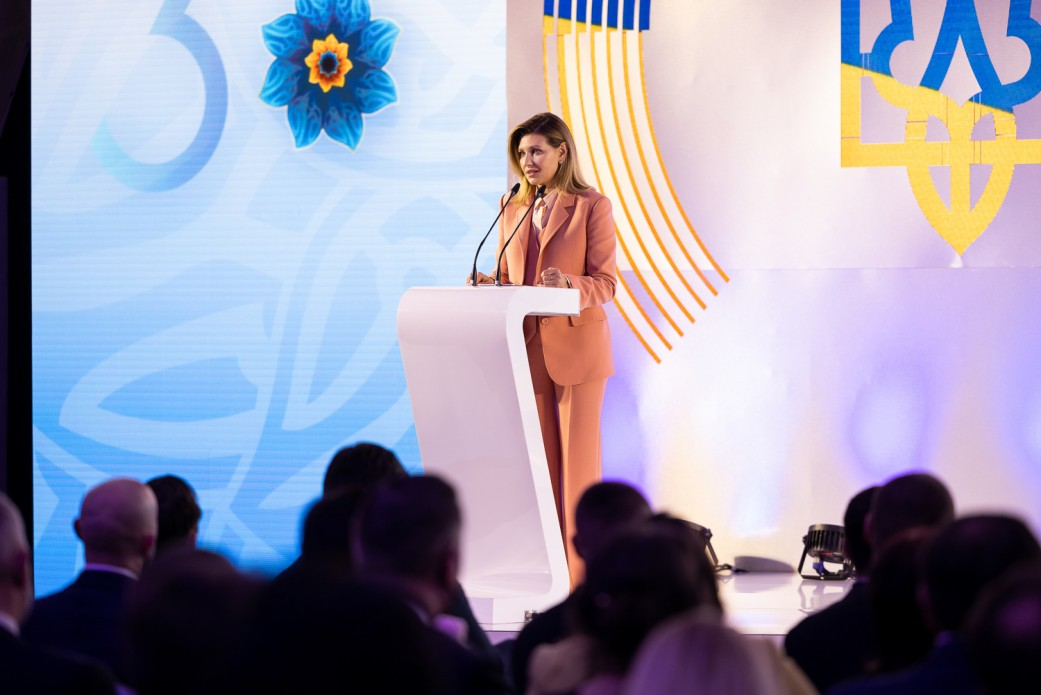
Olena Zelenska makes a speech at an annual conference of ambassadors of Ukraine.

The social activities of the First Lady of Ukraine before the war had three main directions: the health of future generations, equal opportunities and cultural diplomacy.

Olena Zelenska initiated such projects as the improvement of the school food system and the development of the National Strategy for a safe school environment, the fight against domestic and gender based violence, the barrier-free environment, and the introduction of audio guides in Ukrainian museums around the world.

On 3 December 2020, the President signed the Decree "On ensuring the creation of a barrier-free space in Ukraine". At the initiative of the First Lady, the National Barrier-Free Strategy—standards of equal opportunities for all population groups—was adopted, as well as the Action Plan for overcoming barriers—a road map for each department—was developed.

On 13 January 2020, she became a member of the Development Council of the Mystetskyi Arsenal National Art and Culture Museum Complex.

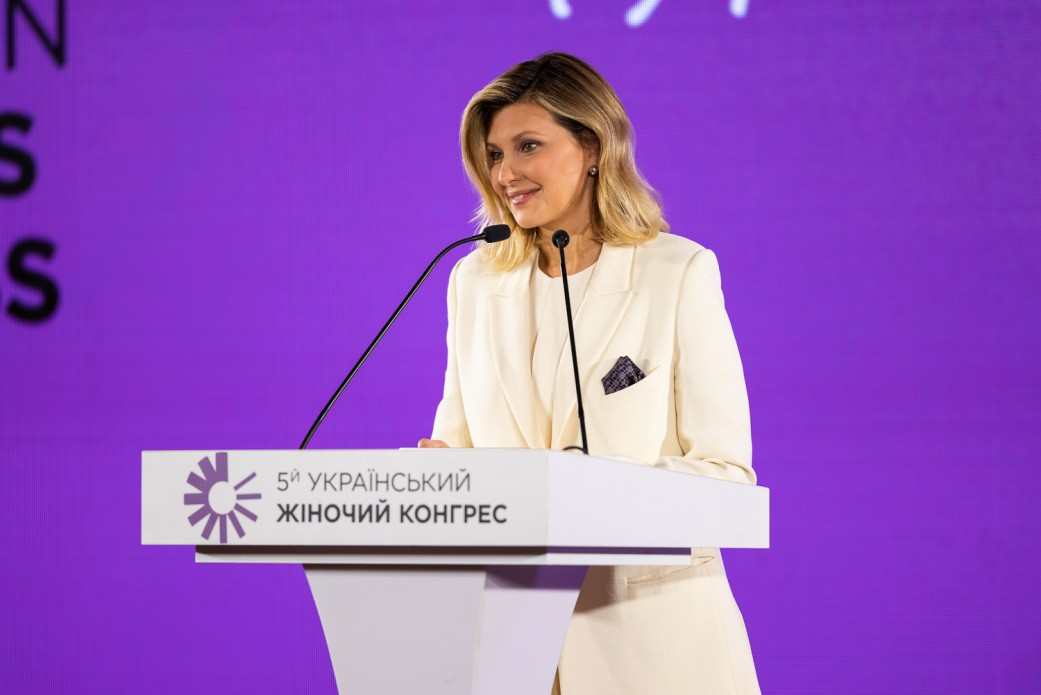
Olena Zelenska at the Fifth Ukrainian Women's Congress in 2021

On 11 September 2020, at the initiative of the President's wife, Ukraine joined the Biarritz Partnership, undertaking commitments in the areas of gender equality and the development of barrier-free public space.

In 2021, a large-scale reform of school meals took place. A new full-fledged 4-week menu was presented, the modernization of food storage facilities began, and the behavioral communication campaign of UNICEF in Ukraine on healthy nutrition for children and parents was launched.

As part of the initiative of the First Lady of Ukraine, more than 50 audio guides in the Ukrainian language have already been launched in the best cultural institutions in more than 30 countries. The project started in 2020.

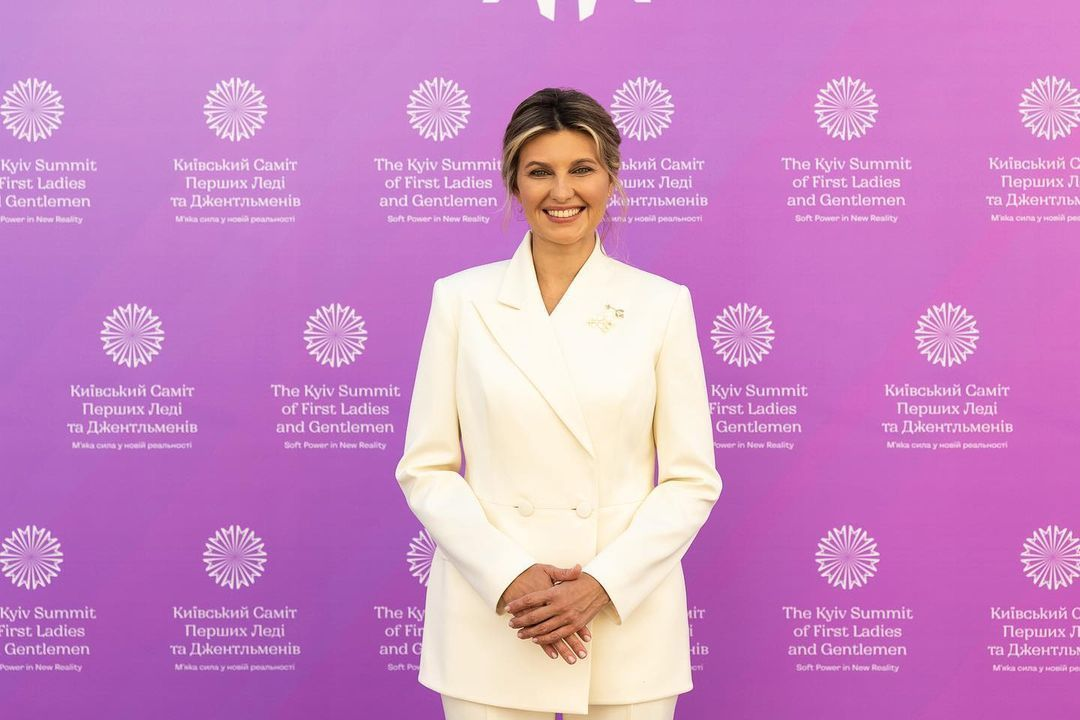
Olena Zelenska at the Kyiv Summit of First Ladies and Gentlemen

On 23 August 2021, the First Kyiv Summit of First Ladies and Gentlemen took place in Kyiv at the initiative of Olena Zelenska. Eleven first ladies from different countries joined the event. The main topic of discussion was the post-COVID reality. At the end of the event, the participants approved a joint declaration.

The purpose of the summits is to unite the First Ladies and Gentlemen to create an international platform to share experiences and implement joint projects for the well-being of people in the world; to discuss the current problems and activities of the First Ladies and Gentlemen to solve them; to make the voice of every first lady and gentleman more influential.

=== Activities since the full-scale Russian invasion ===
After the 2022 Russian invasion of Ukraine, Zelenska was described as Russia's target number two. In mid-March, she was in Ukraine at an undisclosed location. She released a statement highlighting the names of children killed during the invasion. During the war, her efforts have focused on humanitarian aid, especially the evacuation of children with disabilities through Poland and the importing of incubators to hospitals in warzone areas. Zelenska made her first public appearance since the start of the invasion in a 8 May 2022 meeting with Jill Biden in Uzhhorod. Biden's trip to Ukraine, which coincided with Mother's Day as celebrated in the US and in Ukraine, was not publicly disclosed in advance.

At the initiative of the First Lady, projects in the field of medicine are being developed: evacuation of children with severe cancer diseases abroad with further treatment there, the search for equipment for children's hospitals, in particular, incubators for newborns.

In the humanitarian sphere, Olena Zelenska takes care of sending orphans for a long-term stay abroad. The First Lady also oversees humanitarian aid to family-type orphanages, large families, and elderly people who have remained and live in the liberated territories to reinforce the connection with the Homeland for forcibly displaced people, the First Lady initiated the project "Books without borders" in 2022. 260,000 books in Ukrainian were printed for children who left their homes due to Russian aggression and found shelter in 20 countries.

The project "Ukrainian bookshelf" is being carried out under the patronage of the First Lady. It provides for the distribution of Ukrainian literature and its translations in the world's leading libraries. More than 20 countries have already joined the initiative.

In the "Barrier-Free Handbook" launched by the First Lady, a new section has been created with wartime tips and instructions for families with disabilities, the elderly and their loved ones, and people with disabilities.

In May 2022, Olena Zelenska initiated the creation of the National Program of Mental Health and Psychosocial Support. The program is designed to help Ukrainians overcome the consequences of the traumatic events of the war.

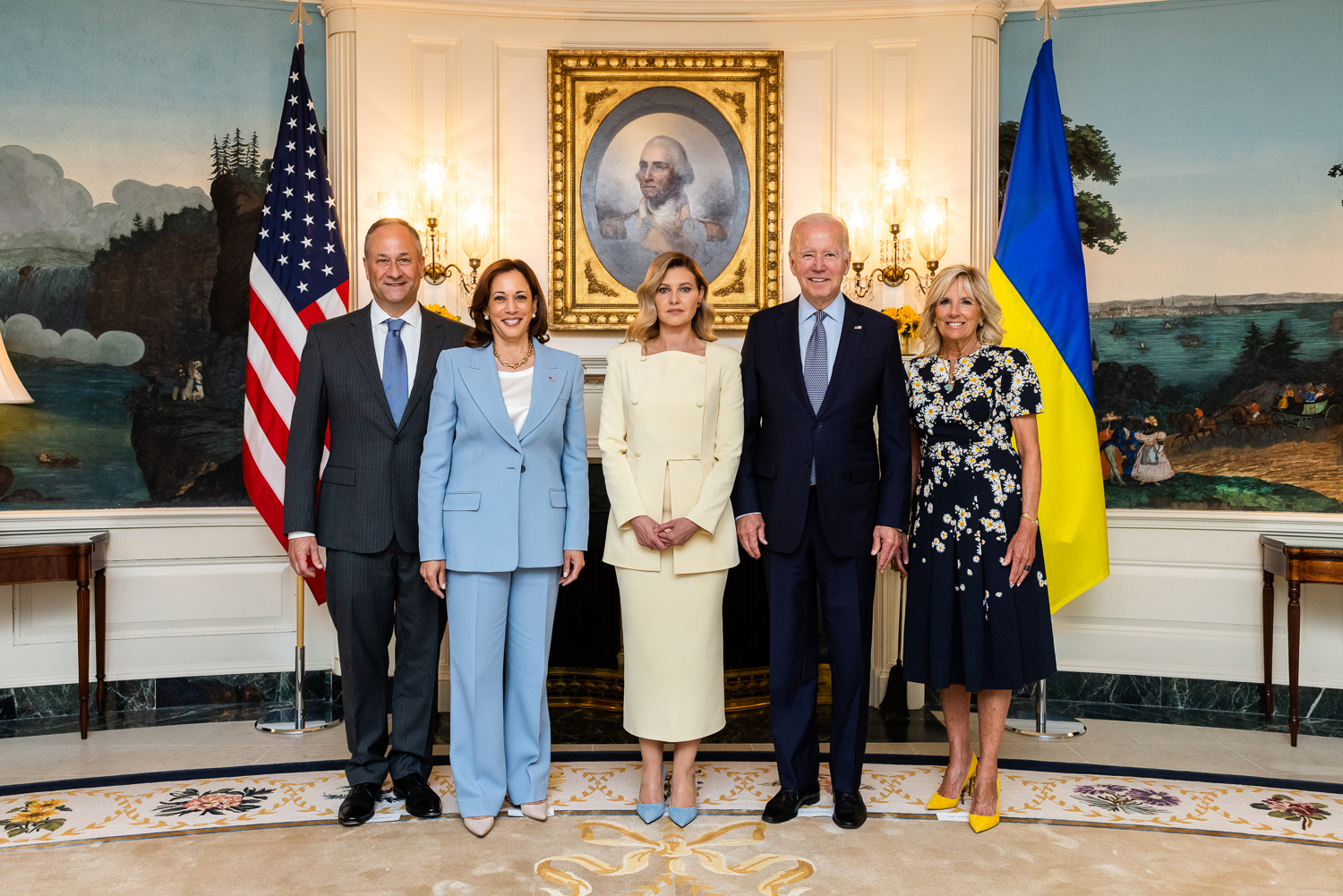
Olena Zelenska, the US President Joe Biden and the US First Lady Jill Biden, the US Vice President Kamala Harris and the US Second Gentleman Doug Emhoff

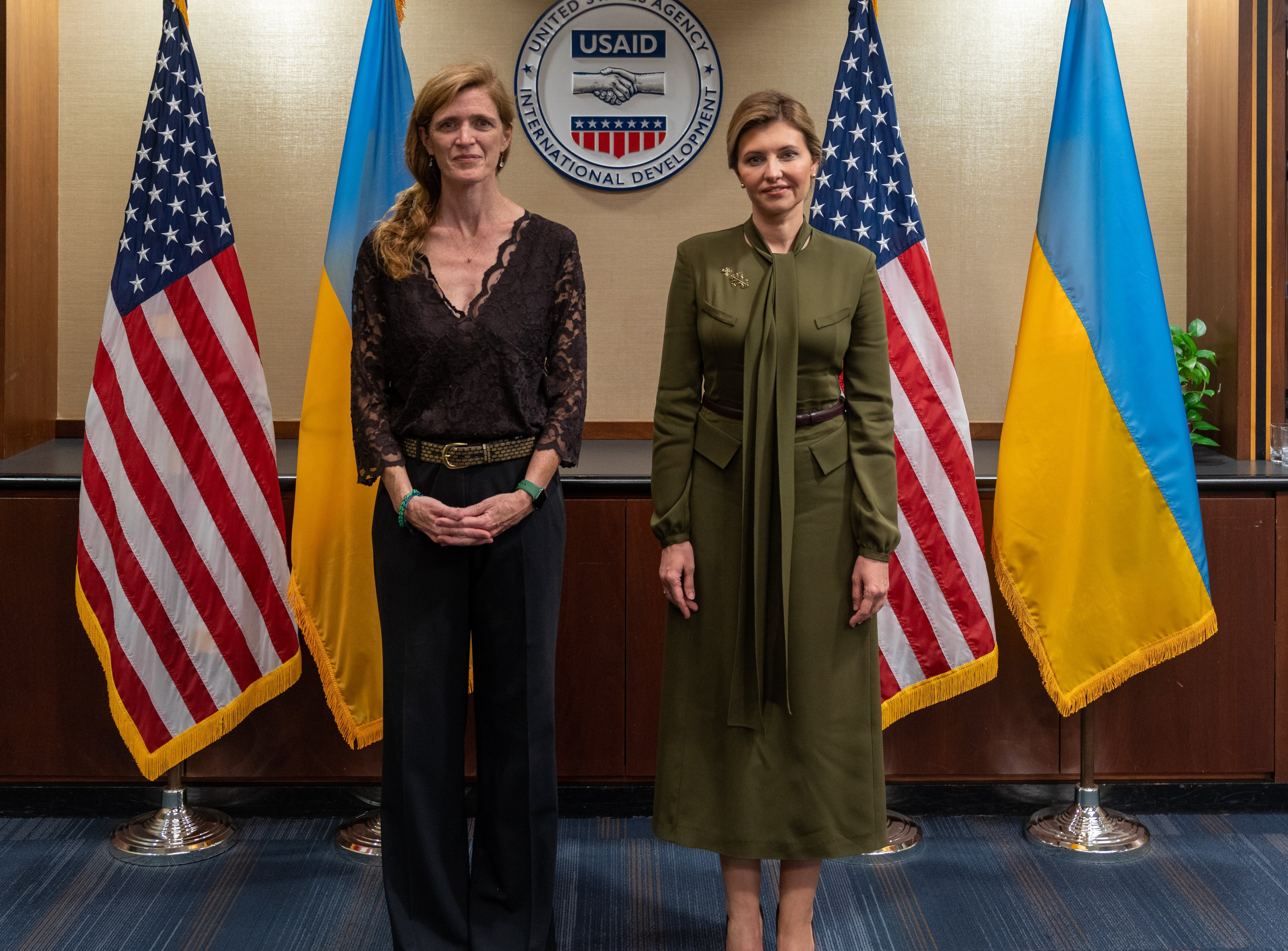
USAID administrator Samantha Power and Olena Zelenska at the USAID HQ in 2022

On 19 July 2022, Zelenska started her visit to the United States. On the first day of the visit, Zelenska met with the US Secretary of State Antony Blinken, and Samantha Power, the Administrator of the United States Agency for International Development. On the second day of the visit, she held a meeting with the first lady of the United States, Jill Biden, at the White House. Zelenska was also met on the porch of the White House by US President Joe Biden and Vice President Kamala Harris.

Zelenska also addressed the US Congress on the second day of her visit, becoming the first First Lady of another country to speak before the US Congress. She called for more military aid to the Ukrainian Armed Forces to protect the country from Russian invasion.

Zelenska dedicated the beginning of her speech to the families and children impacted by the Russian invasion of Ukraine. One of the images included was of a four-year-old Liza Dmytriyeva, who was killed in an air strike in the central-western city of Vinnytsia. Zelenska also showed photos and videos of the victims of the Kremenchuk shopping mall attack and other numerous victims of Russian invasion.

I appeal to all of you on the behalf of those who were killed, on behalf of those people who lost their arms and legs, on behalf of those who are still alive and well and those who wait for their families to come back from the front. I'm asking for something now I would never want to ask. I am asking for weapons. Weapons that would not be used to wage a war on somebody else's land, but to protect one's home and the right to wake up alive in that home.

— Olena Zelenska

During the trip, Zelenska also accepted the Dissident Human Rights Award at the Victims of Communism Memorial in Washington, D.C., on behalf of the entire Ukrainian people.

On 23 July 2022, Ukraine hosted the second Summit of First Ladies and Gentlemen dedicated to the post-war reconstruction of Ukraine. The event was planned to be held in the format of a telebridge between different countries of the world. Within the Summit, fundraising for C-type ambulance vehicles was announced. USD 6.4 million was raised in total, allowing to purchase 84 ambulance vehicles for the Ministry of Health of Ukraine. These ambulance vehicles are equipped with everything necessary to quickly and safely transport the seriously injured to the hospitals.

In September 2022, Zelenska was present as an invitee to Ursula von der Leyen's third State of the European Union address, where the EU Commission President rendered homage to her courage during the war in Ukraine.

On 19 September 2022, Zelenska attended the state funeral in London of Queen Elizabeth II to pay her respects to the late monarch "on behalf of all Ukrainians".

On 2 October 2022, Zelenska visited Turkey, where she discussed the evacuation of Ukrainian orphans to Turkey with Turkish first lady Emine Erdoğan, met ecumenical patriarch Bartholomew I of Constantinople, and launched the Ukrainian corvette Hetman Ivan Mazepa.

On 16 May 2023, Zelenska visited South Korea in her capacity as a special presidential envoy of Zelenskyy. President Yoon Suk Yeol of South Korea said "South Korea will provide active assistance to her country in close coordination with the international community."

==== Russian disinformation ====
Zelenska has repeatedly been targeted by disinformation campaigns accusing her of luxurious spending; these claims have been disproven. She was alleged by social media and several news outlets in France to have spent over €40,000 during a shopping spree in Paris, during her visit in December 2022, but these claims proved to be false and originally circulated by pro-Russia media. In October 2023, Zelenska was falsely accused of spending $1 million on jewelry on another shopping spree in New York City. The claim, originated in a video by a woman who claimed to be from Benin working at a Cartier location in New York but who was actually identified as living in St. Petersburg, was promoted by a sponsored post of the Nigerian website the Nation and pro-Kremlin English language websites, including the Russian UK embassy's Twitter account. On the day of the supposed purchase, 22 September 2023, Zelenska was actually on a visit to Canada with her husband. Also in 2023, it was falsely claimed that Zelenska and her husband had purchased two luxury yachts worth roughly €70 million with American aid funds, a claim promoted by US government figures such as Marjorie Taylor Greene and JD Vance. The two ships in question were later confirmed by the luxury yacht brokers to have not even been sold.

In 2024, Zelenska was falsely accused of having bought a $1 million Bugatti sports car, a claim widely disseminated on social media by Jackson Hinkle. A video in which the claim was made was found to have been generated by artificial intelligence, and the news website in which the claim was promoted was discovered to have been fabricated. The Paris car dealership supposedly involved also stated that it had nothing to do with the incident and filed a complaint with the authorities.

=== Olena Zelenska Foundation ===
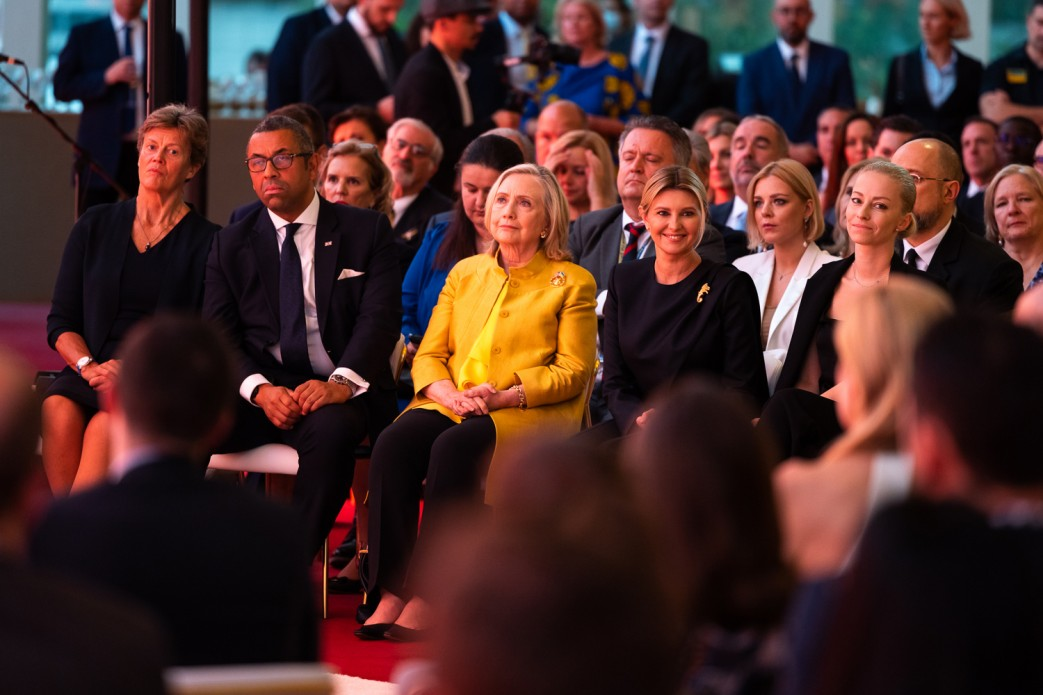
Hillary Clinton and Olena Zelenska during the presentation of the foundation

On 22 September 2022, Olena Zelenska presented her foundation at a charity evening in New York City during the 77th UN General Assembly.

The Foundation's primary goal is to restore Ukraine's human capital so that every Ukrainian feels physically and mentally healthy, protected, and able to exercise their right to education, work, and build a future in Ukraine.

The Foundation has three key directions: medicine, education and humanitarian aid. Within these areas, it will provide targeted assistance, invest in reconstructing preschool and school education institutions, polyclinics, and outpatient clinics, and provide grants for training and scientific developments. The Foundation sees foreign businesses and other international foundations as its key partners and donors.

== Accolades ==
Zelenska received ShEO Awards 2022 in the nomination "World Peace". The award was founded by Wprost, one of the most influential and oldest publications in Poland.

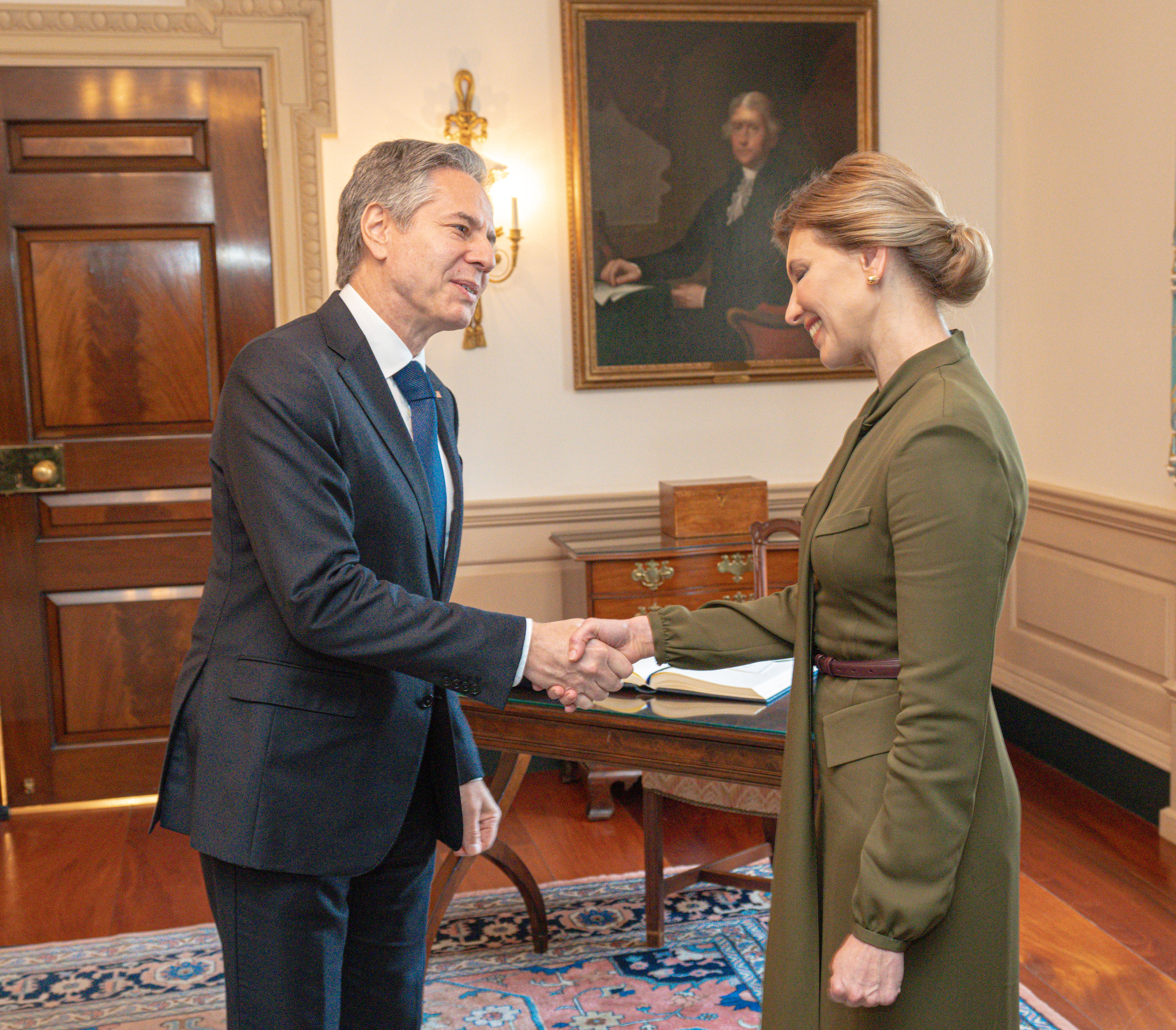
Zelenska meeting with US Secretary of State Antony Blinken in 2022

On 9 November 2022, Olena Zelenska was included in the ELLE 100 Women.

On 6 December 2022, the First Lady of Ukraine Olena Zelenska received the Hillary Rodham Clinton Awards, presented annually by the Georgetown Institute for Women, Peace and Security for exceptional leadership in recognizing the exceptional leadership in promoting women's rights and creating a more peaceful and secure world for all.

She was honored as one of the BBC 100 Women in December 2022.

In November 2023, Olena Zelenska is included in the list of the 25 most influential women in the world according to the Financial Times.

== See also ==
- Olena Zelenska Foundation

== Notes ==
Honorary titles
Preceded by Maryna Poroshenko	First Lady of Ukraine; 2019–present	Current holder
